= Shawn Mendes discography =

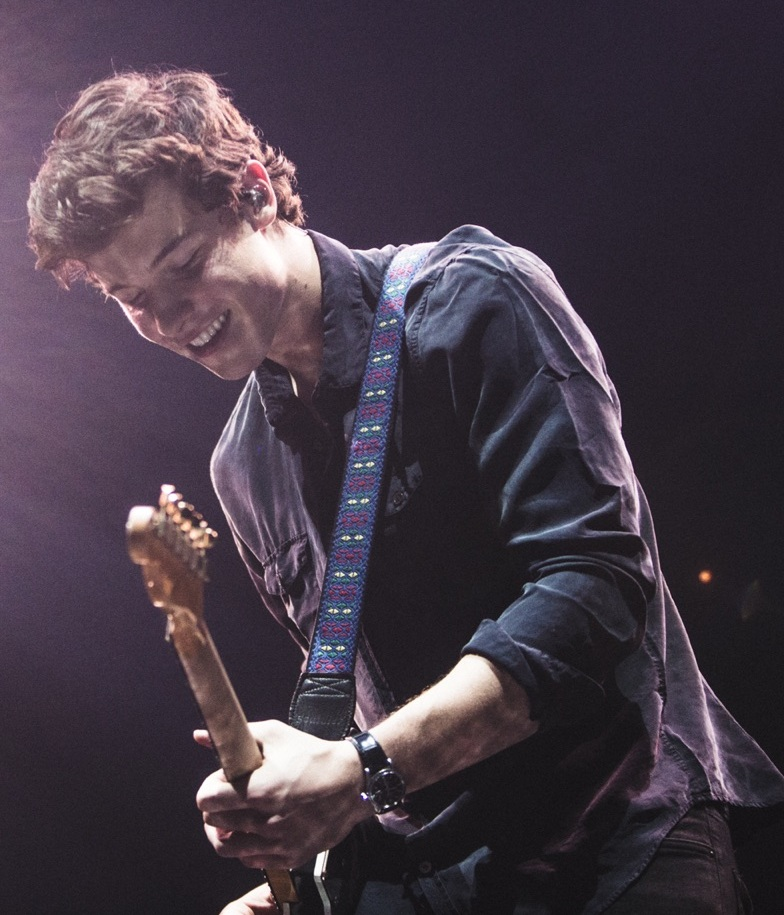
- Mendes in 2017
- Studio albums: 5
- EPs: 3
- Live albums: 2
- Singles: 25
- Music videos: 29
- Reissues: 1
- Promotional singles: 11

Canadian singer-songwriter Shawn Mendes has released five studio albums, two live albums, one reissue, three extended plays, twenty-five singles (including five as a featured artist), and eleven promotional singles. He has sold over 20 million albums and 175 million singles worldwide. According to RIAA, Mendes has sold 50.5 million digital singles and 5 million certified albums in the US.

Mendes released his first single "Life of the Party" in June 2014, which debuted in the top 25 of the US Billboard Hot 100, making him the youngest artist to debut in the top 25 of the Hot 100 with their debut song. He followed this with an extended play in July 2014, The Shawn Mendes EP, which debuted at number five on Billboard.

His debut studio album, Handwritten (2015), debuted at number one on the Billboard 200 with 119,000 equivalent album units, selling 106,000 copies in its first week. "Something Big" was released as the second single from the album on November 7, 2014, eventually peaking at number 80. The third single from the album, "Stitches", became an international hit, peaking at number one in the UK, number four on the US Billboard Hot 100, number one on Billboard Adult Top 40, and number one on Billboard Adult Contemporary, becoming his first top entry on the UK Singles Chart and his first top 10 in the US. In November 2015, Mendes and Camila Cabello who was at the time a member of the group Fifth Harmony, released their collaborative song "I Know What You Did Last Summer". The song was included on the Revisited reissue of Handwritten.

Mendes released his second studio album Illuminate in 2016, which also debuted at number one on the US Billboard 200 chart with 145,000 equivalent album units, selling 121,000 copies in its first week. His lead single "Treat You Better" peaked at number six on Hot 100, the second single "Mercy" peaked at number 15, and the third single "There's Nothing Holdin' Me Back" peaked at number six. The three singles reached number one on both Adult Top 40 and Adult Contemporary airplay charts, making Mendes the first artist to have three number one singles in the latter chart before turning 20 years old.

In March 2018, Mendes released "In My Blood" as the lead single from his self-titled third album. It peaked at number eleven on the Hot 100 and number one on the Adult Top 40, making Mendes the first artist to have four singles to top the latter chart before turning 20 years old. His second single "Lost in Japan" was released the next day. He released "Youth", "Where Were You in the Morning?", and "Nervous" as singles in May. The same month, he released his self-titled third studio album which debuted at number one in the United States, Canada, Australia, and several European music charts. In 2019, Mendes released his second collaboration with Cabello, "Señorita", which topped the Billboard Hot 100. In December 2020, Mendes became the youngest male artist ever to top the Billboard 200 with four studio albums, with the release of Wonder (2020).

Mendes' first four studio albums debuted at number one in Canada and the United States. Billboard listed him as the 34th Top Artist of the 2010s and placed two entries on their list of Billboard 200 Albums of the 2010s: Illuminate (No. 182) and Shawn Mendes (No. 195). Mendes also has five singles that have sold over a million units in the UK: "Stitches" (2.2 million), "Señorita" (1.73 million), "Treat You Better" (1.62 million), "There's Nothing Holdin' Me Back" (1.6 million) and "Mercy" (1.1 million).

== Albums ==
=== Studio albums ===
List of studio albums, with selected chart positions, sales figures and certifications
Title	Details	Peak chart positions										Sales	Certifications
Title	Details	CAN	AUS	DEN	GER	ITA	NOR	NZ	SWE	UK	US	Sales	Certifications
Handwritten	Released: April 14, 2015; Label: Island; Format: CD, digital download, LP, streaming	1	18	2	43	10	1	18	4	12	1	CAN: 90,000; US: 466,000	MC: 5× Platinum; ARIA: Gold; BPI: Platinum; BVMI: Gold; FIMI: Gold; IFPI DEN: 5× Platinum; IFPI NOR: Platinum; IFPI SWE: 2× Platinum; RIAA: 2× Platinum; RMNZ: 2× Platinum
Illuminate	Released: September 23, 2016; Label: Island; Format: CD, digital download, LP, streaming	1	3	1	2	3	1	2	1	3	1	US: 376,000	MC: 6× Platinum; ARIA: Platinum; BPI: Platinum; BVMI: Gold; FIMI: Platinum; IFPI DEN: 6× Platinum; IFPI NOR: Gold; IFPI SWE: 2× Platinum; RIAA: 3× Platinum; RMNZ: 4× Platinum
Shawn Mendes	Released: May 25, 2018; Label: Island; Format: CD, digital download, LP, streaming	1	1	2	3	2	2	2	5	3	1	US: 281,000	MC: 6× Platinum; ARIA: 2× Platinum; BPI: Platinum; FIMI: Gold; IFPI DEN: 2× Platinum; IFPI NOR: 3× Platinum; IFPI SWE: Gold; RIAA: Platinum; RMNZ: 2× Platinum
Wonder	Released: December 4, 2020; Label: Island; Format: CD, digital download, cassette, LP, streaming	1	2	10	8	15	6	4	23	12	1	US: 54,000	MC: Platinum; IFPI DEN: Gold; RMNZ: Gold
Shawn	Released: November 15, 2024; Label: Island; Format: CD, digital download, cassette, LP, streaming	24	23	—	5	43	39	31	—	22	26		
"—" denotes a recording that did not chart or was not released in that territory.

=== Reissues ===
Title	Details	Certifications
Handwritten Revisited	Released: November 20, 2015; Label: Island; Formats: CD, CD+DVD, digital download, streaming, DL	IFPI DEN: Gold

=== Live albums ===
Title	Details	Peak chart positions			Sales
Title	Details	CAN	GER	US	Sales
Live at Madison Square Garden	Released: December 23, 2016; Label: Island; Formats: Digital download, streaming	—	—	200	US: 8,000
MTV Unplugged	Released: November 3, 2017; Label: Island; Formats: CD, digital download, streaming, LP	35	59	71	US: 8,000
"—" denotes a recording that did not chart or was not released in that territory.

== Extended plays ==
Title	Details	Peak chart positions			Sales
Title	Details	CAN	NZ	US	Sales
The Shawn Mendes EP	Released: July 28, 2014; Label: Island; Format: CD, digital download, streaming	5	36	5	US: 105,000
Spotify Singles	Released: November 14, 2018; Label: Island; Format: Streaming	—	—	—	
The Album (Remixes)	Released: December 21, 2018; Label: Island; Format: Digital download, streaming	—	—	—	
"—" denotes a recording that did not chart or was not released in that territory.

== Singles ==
=== As lead artist ===
List of singles as lead artist, showing year released, with selected chart positions, certifications and album name
Title	Year	Peak chart positions										Certifications	Album
Title	Year	CAN	AUS	DEN	GER	ITA	NOR	NZ	SWE	UK	US	Certifications	Album
"Life of the Party"	2014	9	—	—	—	—	—	6	37	99	24	MC: 4× Platinum; ARIA: Platinum; BPI: Silver; IFPI DEN: Gold; IFPI NOR: Platinum; IFPI SWE: Platinum; RIAA: 2× Platinum; RMNZ: Platinum	Handwritten
"Something Big"	2014	11	—	—	—	—	—	—	— (Note: "Something Big" did not enter the Swedish Singles Chart, but peaked at number nine on the Swedish Heatseeker chart.)	109	80	MC: 3× Platinum; ARIA: Gold; BPI: Silver; IFPI SWE: Gold; RIAA: Platinum; RMNZ: Gold	Handwritten
"Stitches"	2015	10	4	2	2	2	2	5	2	1	4	MC: 7× Platinum; ARIA: 11× Platinum; BPI: 5× Platinum; BVMI: 3× Gold; FIMI: 5× Platinum; IFPI DEN: 4× Platinum; IFPI NOR: 4× Platinum; IFPI SWE: 10× Platinum; RIAA: 11× Platinum; RMNZ: 6× Platinum	Handwritten
"I Know What You Did Last Summer" (with Camila Cabello)	2015	19	33	21	90	53	18	— (Note: "I Know What You Did Last Summer" did not enter the NZ Top 40 Singles Chart, but peaked at number 1 on the NZ Heatseekers Singles Chart.)	24	42	20	MC: 3× Platinum; ARIA: 2× Platinum; BPI: Gold; FIMI: Gold; IFPI DEN: Platinum; IFPI NOR: Platinum; IFPI SWE: Platinum; RIAA: 3× Platinum; RMNZ: 2× Platinum	Handwritten
"Treat You Better"	2016	7	4	4	4	7	7	11	4	6	6	MC: 7× Platinum; ARIA: 10× Platinum; BPI: 4× Platinum; BVMI: 3× Gold; FIMI: 4× Platinum; IFPI DEN: 3× Platinum; IFPI NOR: 3× Platinum; IFPI SWE: 5× Platinum; RIAA: 9× Platinum; RMNZ: 5× Platinum	Illuminate
"Mercy"	2016	22	13	7	16	10	16	18	20	15	15	MC: 5× Platinum; ARIA: 7× Platinum; BPI: 2× Platinum; BVMI: Platinum; FIMI: 3× Platinum; IFPI DEN: 2× Platinum; IFPI NOR: 2× Platinum; IFPI SWE: 3× Platinum; RIAA: 6× Platinum; RMNZ: 4× Platinum	Illuminate
"There's Nothing Holdin' Me Back"	2017	6	4	4	5	18	15	8	11	4	6	MC: 7× Platinum; ARIA: 11× Platinum; BPI: 4× Platinum; BVMI: 3× Gold; FIMI: 4× Platinum; IFPI DEN: 3× Platinum; IFPI SWE: 2× Platinum; RIAA: 9× Platinum; RMNZ: 7× Platinum	Illuminate
"In My Blood"	2018	9	9	12	8	35	10	13	11	10	11	MC: 4× Platinum; ARIA: 5× Platinum; BPI: Platinum; BVMI: Gold; FIMI: Platinum; IFPI DEN: Platinum; IFPI NOR: Platinum; RIAA: 2× Platinum; RMNZ: 3× Platinum	Shawn Mendes
"Lost in Japan" (Note: "Lost in Japan" was originally released as a promotional single and appears on the standard edition of Shawn Mendes; the song was later re-released as a remix which only appears as a CD deluxe edition bonus track on Shawn Mendes.) (solo or remix with Zedd)	2018	22	27	20	69	67	—	32	55	30	48	MC: 3× Platinum; ARIA: 4× Platinum; BPI: Platinum; FIMI: Platinum; IFPI DEN: Platinum; RIAA: 2× Platinum; RMNZ: 3× Platinum	Shawn Mendes
"Youth" (featuring Khalid)	2018	22	19	14	43	57	18	22	23	35	65	MC: Platinum; ARIA: 2× Platinum; BPI: Silver; IFPI DEN: Gold; IFPI NOR: Gold; RIAA: Platinum; RMNZ: Platinum	Shawn Mendes
"Where Were You in the Morning?"	2018	81	67	—	—	—	—	— (Note: "Where Were You in the Morning?" did not enter the NZ Top 40 Singles or Hot Singles chart, but peaked at number six on the Heatseeker Singles chart.)	93	91	—	MC: Gold; ARIA: Gold; RMNZ: Gold	Shawn Mendes
"Nervous"	2018	66	51	—	86	—	—	— (Note: "Nervous" did not enter the NZ Top 40 Singles or Hot Singles chart, but peaked at number one on the Heatseeker Singles chart.)	71	54	— (Note: "Nervous" did not enter the Billboard Hot 100, but peaked at number eight on the Bubbling Under Hot 100 Singles chart.)	MC: Gold; ARIA: Platinum; RMNZ: Platinum	Shawn Mendes
"If I Can't Have You" (Note: "If I Can't Have You" only appears on the deluxe edition of Shawn Mendes.)	2019	2	4	5	14	31	11	4	10	9	2	MC: 3× Platinum; ARIA: 5× Platinum; BPI: Platinum; BVMI: Gold; FIMI: Gold; IFPI DEN: Platinum; RIAA: 3× Platinum; RMNZ: 3× Platinum	Shawn Mendes
"Señorita" (Note: "Señorita" only appears on the deluxe edition of Shawn Mendes. It also features on Camila Cabello's second studio album Romance.) (with Camila Cabello)	2019	1	1	1	1	1	1	1	1	1	1	MC: 7× Platinum; ARIA: 10× Platinum; BPI: 4× Platinum; BVMI: 3× Gold; FIMI: 4× Platinum; IFPI DEN: 3× Platinum; IFPI NOR: 4× Platinum; IFPI SWE: 2× Platinum; RIAA: 5× Platinum; RMNZ: 6× Platinum	Shawn Mendes
"Wonder"	2020	4	13	28	47	86	16	19	22	20	18	MC: 3× Platinum; ARIA: 3× Platinum; BPI: Gold; FIMI: Gold; IFPI DEN: Gold; RIAA: Platinum; RMNZ: 2× Platinum	Wonder
"Monster" (with Justin Bieber)	2020	1	7	1	6	36	4	8	9	9	8	MC: 2× Platinum; ARIA: 2× Platinum; BPI: Silver; FIMI: Gold; IFPI DEN: Platinum; IFPI NOR: Gold; RIAA: Platinum; RMNZ: 2× Platinum	Wonder
"Summer of Love" (with Tainy)	2021	17	81	—	79	—	36	— (Note: "Summer of Love" did not enter the NZ Top 40 Singles Chart, but peaked at number 10 on the NZ Hot Singles Chart.)	48	62	48	ARIA: Platinum; RMNZ: Gold	Non-album singles
"It'll Be Okay"	2021	46	53	—	53	—	5	— (Note: "It'll Be Okay" did not enter the NZ Top 40 Singles Chart, but peaked at number six on the NZ Hot Singles Chart.)	24	57	— (Note: "It'll Be Okay" did not enter the Billboard Hot 100, but peaked at number two on the Bubbling Under Hot 100 Singles chart.)	ARIA: Platinum; RMNZ: Gold	Non-album singles
"When You're Gone"	2022	13	22	15	37	—	17	— (Note: "When You're Gone" did not enter the NZ Top 40 Singles Chart, but peaked at number two on the NZ Hot Singles Chart.)	38	32	38	ARIA: Platinum; BPI: Silver; IFPI DEN: Gold; RMNZ: Platinum	Non-album singles
"What the Hell Are We Dying For?"	2023	—	—	—	—	—	—	— (Note: "What the Hell Are We Dying For?" did not enter the NZ Top 40 Singles Chart, but peaked at number 28 on the NZ Hot Singles Chart.)	—	—	—		Non-album singles
"Why Why Why"	2024	30	—	—	76	—	—	— (Note: "Why Why Why" did not enter the NZ Top 40 Singles Chart, but peaked at number four on the NZ Hot Singles Chart.)	60	59	84		Shawn
"Isn't That Enough"	2024	—	—	—	—	—	—	— (Note: "Isn't That Enough" did not enter the NZ Top 40 Singles Chart, but peaked at number 22 on the NZ Hot Singles Chart.)	—	—	—		Shawn
"Nobody Knows"	2024	—	—	—	—	—	—	— (Note: "Nobody Knows" did not enter the NZ Top 40 Singles Chart, but peaked at number 22 on the NZ Hot Singles Chart.)	—	—	—		Shawn
"Heart of Gold"	2024	91	—	—	—	—	—	— (Note: "Heart of Gold" did not enter the NZ Top 40 Singles Chart, but peaked at number eight on the NZ Hot Singles Chart.)	—	81	—		Shawn
"—" denotes a recording that did not chart or was not released in that territory.

=== As featured artist ===
List of singles as featured artist, showing year released, with selected chart positions, certifications and album name
Title	Year	Peak chart positions					Certifications	Album
Title	Year	CAN Dig.	AUS	IRE	NZ	UK	Certifications	Album
"Oh Cecilia (Breaking My Heart)" (The Vamps featuring Shawn Mendes)	2014	48	46	42	13	9	BPI: Silver; RMNZ: Gold	Meet the Vamps
"Lover (Remix)" (Taylor Swift featuring Shawn Mendes)	2019	—	—	—	19	—	RMNZ: Gold	Non-album single
"Count On Me" (Brockhampton featuring ASAP Rocky, SoGone SoFlexy, Ryan Beatty and Shawn Mendes)	2021	—	—	—	10	—		Roadrunner: New Light, New Machine
"Kesi (Remix)" (Camilo featuring Shawn Mendes)	2021	—	—	—	—	—	RIAA: Platinum (Latin)	Non-album single
"Witness Me" (Jacob Collier featuring Shawn Mendes, Stormzy and Kirk Franklin)	2023	—	—	—	—	—		Djesse Vol. 4
"Home" (Eddie Benjamin featuring Shawn Mendes)	2025	—	—	—	—	—		Home
"—" denotes a recording that did not chart or was not released in that territory.

=== Promotional singles ===
List of promotional singles, showing year released, with selected chart positions, certifications and album name
Title	Year	Peak chart positions					Certifications	Album
Title	Year	CAN	NZ	SWE	UK	US	Certifications	Album
"A Little Too Much"	2015	74	—	—	119	94	ARIA: Gold; BPI: Silver; IFPI DEN: Gold; RIAA: Gold; RMNZ: Gold	Handwritten
"Never Be Alone"	2015	49	—	—	—	— (Note: "Never Be Alone" did not enter the Billboard Hot 100, but peaked at number eight on the Bubbling Under Hot 100 chart.)	ARIA: Platinum; BPI: Silver; IFPI DEN: Gold; RIAA: Gold; RMNZ: Gold	Handwritten
"Kid in Love"	2015	69	—	—	—	—		Handwritten
"Believe"	2015	—	—	—	—	—		Descendants
"Ruin"	2016	68	—	—	—	— (Note: "Ruin" did not enter the Billboard Hot 100, but peaked at number 40 on the Digital Song Sales component chart.)	ARIA: Gold; RIAA: Gold	Illuminate
"Three Empty Words"	2016	—	—	— (Note: "Three Empty Words" did not enter the Swedish Singles Chart, but peaked at number 18 on the Swedish Heatseeker chart.)	—	—		Illuminate
"Don't Be a Fool"	2016	— (Note: "Don't Be a Fool" did not enter the Billboard Canadian Hot 100, but peaked at number 34 on the Hot Canadian Digital Songs component chart.)	— (Note: "Don't Be a Fool" did not enter the NZ Top 40 Singles or Hot Singles chart, but peaked at number seven on the Heatseeker Singles chart.)	82	—	— (Note: "Don't Be a Fool" did not enter the Billboard Hot 100, but peaked at number 16 on the Bubbling Under Hot 100 Singles chart.)		Illuminate
"Under Pressure" (featuring Teddy<3)	2018	—	— (Note: "Under Pressure" did not enter the NZ Top 40 Singles or Hot Singles chart, but peaked at number 34 on the NZ Hot Singles chart.)	—	—	—		Non-album promotional single
"Intro"	2020	—	—	—	—	—		Wonder
"Call My Friends"	2020	—	— (Note: "Call My Friends" did not enter the NZ Top 40 Singles Chart, but peaked at number 15 on the NZ Hot Singles Chart.)	—	—	—		Wonder
"Heartbeat"	2022	—	— (Note: "Heartbeat" did not enter the NZ Top 40 Singles Chart, but peaked at number 29 on the NZ Hot Singles Chart.)	—	—	—		Lyle, Lyle, Crocodile
"—" denotes a recording that did not chart or was not released in that territory.

== Other charted and certified songs ==
List of other charted and certified songs, showing year released, with selected chart positions and album name
Title	Year	Peak chart positions								Certifications	Album
Title	Year	CAN	AUS	IRE	NLD	NOR	NZ Hot	SWE	US Bub.	Certifications	Album
"Show You"	2014	—	—	—	—	—	—	—	—	RIAA: Gold	The Shawn Mendes EP
"Aftertaste"	2015	—	—	—	—	—	—	—	—	RIAA: Gold	Handwritten
"The Weight"	2015	76	—	—	—	—	—	—	—	RIAA: Gold	Handwritten
"Imagination"	2015	—	—	—	—	—	—	—	—	ARIA: Gold; IFPI DEN: Gold; RIAA: Gold; RMNZ: Gold	Handwritten
"Air" (featuring Astrid S)	2015	—	—	—	—	40	—	—	—	IFPI NOR: Platinum	Handwritten
"Bad Reputation"	2016	—	—	—	—	—	—	—	—	ARIA: Gold	Illuminate
"No Promises"	2016	68	—	—	—	—	— (Note: "No Promises" did not enter the NZ Top 40 Singles Chart or the NZ Hot Singles Chart, but peaked at number seven on the NZ Heatseeker Singles Chart.)	84	—		Illuminate
"Honest"	2016	—	—	—	—	—	— (Note: "Honest" did not enter the NZ Top 40 Singles Chart or the NZ Hot Singles Chart, but peaked at number eight on the NZ Heatseeker Singles Chart.)	—	—		Illuminate
"Roses"	2016	—	—	—	—	—	—	—	—	ARIA: Gold	Illuminate
"Like to Be You" (featuring Julia Michaels)	2018	—	74	69	53	—	— (Note: "Like to Be You" did not enter the NZ Top 40 Singles Chart or the NZ Hot Singles Chart, but peaked at number four on the NZ Heatseeker Singles Chart.)	— (Note: "Like to Be You" did not enter the Swedish Singellista Chart, but peaked at number six on the Swedish Heatseeker Chart.)	—	MC: Gold; ARIA: Platinum; RMNZ: Gold	Shawn Mendes
"Perfectly Wrong"	2018	—	—	—	86	—	—	— (Note: "Perfectly Wrong" did not enter the Swedish Singellista Chart, but peaked at number one on the Swedish Heatseeker Chart.)	—	ARIA: Gold	Shawn Mendes
"Fallin' All in You"	2018	100	94	91	68	—	—	— (Note: "Fallin' All in You" did not enter the Swedish Singellista Chart, but peaked at number 16 on the Swedish Heatseeker Chart.)	—	MC: Gold; ARIA: Platinum; RMNZ: Gold	Shawn Mendes
"Mutual"	2018	—	—	—	73	—	—	—	—		Shawn Mendes
"Because I Had You"	2018	—	—	—	82	—	—	—	—	MC: Gold	Shawn Mendes
"Particular Taste"	2018	—	—	—	83	—	—	—	—		Shawn Mendes
"Queen"	2018	—	—	—	90	—	—	—	—		Shawn Mendes
"Why"	2018	—	—	—	95	—	—	—	—	MC: Gold	Shawn Mendes
"When You're Ready"	2018	—	—	—	98	—	—	—	—		Shawn Mendes
"Ballin Flossin" (Chance the Rapper featuring Shawn Mendes)	2019	96	—	—	—	—	—	—	23		The Big Day
"Higher"	2020	92	—	—	—	—	13	—	—		Wonder
"Teach Me How to Love"	2020	65	—	—	—	—	6	—	6		Wonder
"Dream"	2020	—	—	—	—	—	17	—	—		Wonder
"The Christmas Song" (with Camila Cabello)	2020	59	—	—	—	—	16	96	—		Wonder
"The Mountain"	2024	—	—	—	—	—	33	—	—		Shawn
"—" denotes a recording that did not chart or was not released in that territory.

== Guest appearances ==
List of other appearances, showing year released, other artist(s) credited and album name
Title	Year	Other artist(s)	Album
"Psycho"	2018	—N/a	BBC Radio 1's Live Lounge 2018
"If I Can Dream" (From the NBC Elvis All-Star Tribute)	2019	Elvis Presley, Post Malone, Darius Rucker, Blake Shelton, Carrie Underwood	The Best of the '68 Comeback Special
"Earth"	2019	Lil Dicky, Justin Bieber, Ariana Grande, Halsey, Zac Brown, Brendon Urie, Hailee Steinfeld, Wiz Khalifa, Snoop Dogg, Kevin Hart, Adam Levine, Charlie Puth, Sia, Miley Cyrus, Lil Jon, Rita Ora, Miguel, Katy Perry, Lil Yachty, Ed Sheeran, Meghan Trainor, Joel Embiid, Tory Lanez, John Legend, Psy, Bad Bunny, Kris Wu, Backstreet Boys, Leonardo DiCaprio	Non-album single
"What a Wonderful World"	2020	Camila Cabello	One World: Together At Home
"Top of the World"	2022	—N/a	Lyle, Lyle, Crocodile
"Take a Look at Us Now"	2022	Javier Bardem	Lyle, Lyle, Crocodile
"Rip Up the Recipe"	2022	Constance Wu	Lyle, Lyle, Crocodile
"Take a Look at Us Now (Reprise)"	2022	Javier Bardem	Lyle, Lyle, Crocodile
"Take a Look at Us Now (Lyle Reprise)"	2022	—N/a	Lyle, Lyle, Crocodile
"Carried Away"	2022	—N/a	Lyle, Lyle, Crocodile
"Take a Look at Us Now (Finale)"	2022	Winslow Fegley, Lyle, Lyle, Crocodile Ensemble	Lyle, Lyle, Crocodile
"Sweetest Thing"	2024	Kyle	Smyle Again

== Music videos ==
Title	Year	Director
As lead artist
"Something Big"	2014	Jon Jon Augustavo
"A Little Too Much"	2015	Blayre Ellestad
"Never Be Alone"	2015	Jon Jon Augustavo
"Life of the Party"	2015	Jon Jon Augustavo
"Aftertaste"	2015	Jon Jon Augustavo
"Stitches"	2015	Jay Martin
"Believe"	2015	Justin Francis
"I Know What You Did Last Summer" (with Camila Cabello)	2015	Ryan Pallotta
"Add It Up"	2016	Unknown
"Treat You Better"	2016	Ryan Pallotta
"Ruin"	2016	Ryan Pallotta
"Mercy"	2016	Jay Martin
"There's Nothing Holdin' Me Back"	2017	Jay Martin
"In My Blood"	2018	Jay Martin
"Nervous"	2018	Eli Russell Linnetz
"Lost in Japan" (Original + Remix) (with Zedd)	2018	Jay Martin
"Youth" (featuring Khalid)	2018	Anthony Mandler
"Lost in Japan" (Remix) (with Zedd)	2018	Unknown
"If I Can't Have You"	2019	Unknown
"Señorita" (with Camila Cabello)	2019	Dave Meyers
"Wonder"	2020	Matty Peacock
"Monster" (with Justin Bieber)	2020	Colin Tilley
"The Christmas Song" (with Camila Cabello)	2020	Camila Cabello and Shawn Mendes
"Can't Imagine"	2020	Unknown
"Summer of Love" (with Tainy)	2021	Matty Peacock
"It'll Be Okay"	2022	Unknown
"When You're Gone"	2022	Unknown
"Why Why Why"	2024	Anthony Wilson and Connor Brashier
"Nobody Knows"	2024	Connor Brashier
"Heart of Gold"	2024	
As featured artist
"Oh Cecilia (Breaking My Heart)" (The Vamps featuring Shawn Mendes)	2014	Frank Borin
"Witness Me" (Jacob Collier featuring Shawn Mendes, Stormzy and Kirk Franklin)	2023	Matthew Palmer

== Songwriting credits ==
List of songs written or co-written for other artists, showing year released and album name
Title	Year	Artist	Album
"Chances"	2018	Backstreet Boys	DNA
"Someone I Used to Know"	2019	Zac Brown Band	The Owl
"Body Language"	2021	Dan + Shay	Good Things
"Hate You"	2023	Jung Kook	Golden
"Sweetest Thing"	2024	Kyle	Smyle Again
