= Shawn Mendes: The Tour =

2019 concert tour by Shawn Mendes

- World tour by Shawn Mendes
- Promotional poster
- Location: Europe • North America • Oceania • Asia • South America
- Associated album: Shawn Mendes
- Start date: March 7, 2019
- End date: December 21, 2019
- Legs: 5
- No. of shows: 105
- Box office: $96,697,569 ($119,371,566 in 2025 dollars)

Shawn Mendes concert chronology
- Illuminate World Tour (2017); Shawn Mendes: The Tour (2019); Wonder: The World Tour (2022)

Shawn Mendes: The Tour was the fourth concert tour by Canadian singer Shawn Mendes, in support of his self-titled third studio album (2018). The tour began in Amsterdam, Netherlands, at the Ziggo Dome on March 7, 2019, and concluded in Mexico City, Mexico, at the Palacio de los Deportes on December 21, 2019.

The September 6 show at the Rogers Centre in Mendes' hometown of Toronto, Canada, was recorded and released as a Netflix-original concert film titled, "Shawn Mendes: Live In Concert", on November 25, 2020.

== Background and development ==
After the announcement of his self-titled third studio album, Mendes announced he would embark on his fourth concert tour. Dates were first announced for Europe and North America on May 8, 2018. Due to overwhelming demand, extra dates were added to Amsterdam, Dublin, and London. On July 17, 2018, dates were announced for Oceania. Extra dates were added in Melbourne and Sydney due to high demand. On December 3, 2018, Mendes announced he would headline his first stadium show in his hometown of Toronto. In a matter of minutes, the show was sold out, marking his biggest show to date.

On January 16, 2019, dates were announced for Latin America. Additional dates in São Paulo, Buenos Aires, Santiago, and Mexico City were added due to the high demand. On February 21, 2019, Mendes announced that the R&B singer and friend, Alessia Cara, would be the opening act for Europe and selected dates in North America. He also added 16 additional shows in North America that included new dates in Edmonton, Saskatoon, Winnipeg, Milwaukee, Ottawa, Columbus, and Philadelphia, two shows in Uncasville, and second shows in Rosemont, Los Angeles, Oakland, Newark, Boston, Montreal, and Brooklyn. On March 28, 2019, Mendes announced American country duo Dan + Shay as the opening act for Oceania, except the Brisbane and Auckland shows where Australian singer-songwriter Ruel would perform. On April 22, 2019, dates were announced for Asia. On May 28, Mendes announced Alessia Cara as the opening act for the Canadian dates of the tour, making her the opening act for all the North American concerts.

== Critical reception ==
In a positive review, Graeme Virtue, writing for The Guardian gave the concert 4 out of 5 stars, stating, “The unstoppable rise of the clean-cut Canadian continues with a set of confessional ballads and grand romantic gestures”, for the show at SSE Hydro, Glasgow. Leslie Ken Chu from Exclaim! praised Mendes for sharing "uplifting, motivational messages about self-empowerment, but he bucked convention by keeping his verbiage short", for the concert at Rogers Arena, Vancouver.

== Accolades ==
Year	Organization	Award	Result	Ref.
2019	Teen Choice Awards	Choice Summer Tour	Nominated	
2020	Pollstar Awards	Best Pop Tour	Nominated	
2020	Ticketmaster Awards	Touring Milestone Award	Won	
2020	Hollywood Music in Media Awards	Live Concert for Visual Media	Won	

== Set list ==
This set list is representative of the show on July 6, 2019 in Los Angeles. It is not intended to represent all shows throughout the tour.

1. "Lost in Japan"
2. "There's Nothing Holdin' Me Back"
3. "Nervous"
4. "Stitches"
5. "Señorita" / "I Know What You Did Last Summer" / "Mutual"
6. "Bad Reputation"
7. "Never Be Alone"
8. "I Wanna Dance with Somebody (Who Loves Me)" / "Because I Had You" / "A Little Too Much" / "Patience" / "When You’re Ready"
9. "Life of the Party"
10. "Like to Be You"
11. "Ruin"
12. "Treat You Better"
13. "Particular Taste"
14. "Where Were You in the Morning?"
15. "Fallin’ All in You"
16. "Youth"
17. "If I Can't Have You"
18. "Why"
19. "Mercy"

Encore

20. "Fix You" / "In My Blood"
Notes
- Starting with the concert in Barcelona, "Because I Had You" and "A Little Too Much" were added to the setlist as a medley with "When You're Ready".
- During the third concert in London, "Ruin" and "Mercy" were not performed due to vocal issues.
- Starting with the concert in Portland, "I Wanna Dance with Somebody" and "Patience" were added to the setlist as medley with the previous "Because I Had You", "A Little Too Much" and "When You're Ready" medley. "If I Can't Have You" and "Señorita were also added to the setlist.
- During the concert in Portland, "Don't Be a Fool" was performed while technical difficulties were being resolved.
- During the concert in Toronto, Mendes performed "Señorita" with Camila Cabello.
- During the third concert in Melbourne, "Fallin' All In You" and "Mercy" were not performed, and "Jessie's Girl" was performed as part of the encore.
- During the second concert in Sydney, "Fallin' All In You" was not performed.

== Tour dates ==
List of concerts, showing date, city, country, venue, opening acts, tickets sold, number of available tickets and amount of gross revenue
Date (2019)	City	Country	Venue	Opening act	Attendance (tickets sold / available	Revenue
Europe
March 7	Amsterdam	Netherlands	Ziggo Dome	Alessia Cara	24,089 / 24,089	$1,551,804
March 8	Amsterdam	Netherlands	Ziggo Dome	Alessia Cara	24,089 / 24,089	$1,551,804
March 10	Antwerp	Belgium	Sportpaleis	Alessia Cara	15,879 / 15,879	$1,017,923
March 11	Berlin	Germany	Mercedes-Benz Arena	Alessia Cara	11,892 / 11,892	$831,070
March 13	Oslo	Norway	Oslo Spektrum	Alessia Cara	6,683 / 6,683	$510,895
March 15	Stockholm	Sweden	Ericsson Globe	Alessia Cara	12,174 / 12,174	$712,062
March 16	Copenhagen	Denmark	Royal Arena	Alessia Cara	13,297 / 13,297	$1,194,461
March 18	Cologne	Germany	Lanxess Arena	Alessia Cara	14,431 / 14,431	$834,946
March 19	Paris	France	AccorHotels Arena	Alessia Cara	12,733 / 12,733	$874,099
March 21	Munich	Germany	Olympiahalle	Alessia Cara	11,257 / 11,257	$790,944
March 23	Bologna	Italy	Unipol Arena	Alessia Cara	8,993 / 8,993	$682,237
March 24	Turin	Italy	Pala Alpitour	Alessia Cara	10,000 / 10,000	$675,695
March 26	Barcelona	Spain	Palau Sant Jordi	Alessia Cara	15,845 / 15,845	$914,678
March 28	Lisbon	Portugal	Altice Arena	Alessia Cara	12,766 / 12,766	$686,953
March 30	Montpellier	France	Sud de France Arena	Alessia Cara	8,146 / 8,146	$521,643
March 31	Zürich	Switzerland	Hallenstadion	Alessia Cara	10,795 / 10,795	$925,527
April 2	Kraków	Poland	Tauron Arena Kraków	Alessia Cara	13,895 / 13,895	$944,257
April 3	Vienna	Austria	Wiener Stadthalle	Alessia Cara	10,445 / 10,445	$636,858
April 6	Glasgow	United Kingdom	SSE Hydro	Alessia Cara	11,041 / 11,041	$747,198
April 7	Manchester	United Kingdom	Manchester Arena	Alessia Cara	14,783 / 14,783	$966,680
April 9	Birmingham	United Kingdom	Arena Birmingham	Alessia Cara	12,614 / 12,614	$818,790
April 10	Leeds	United Kingdom	First Direct Arena	Alessia Cara	10,610 / 10,610	$697,433
April 13	Dublin	Ireland	3Arena	Alessia Cara	16,877 / 16,877	$1,744,767
April 14	Dublin	Ireland	3Arena	Alessia Cara	16,877 / 16,877	$1,744,767
April 16	London	United Kingdom	The O_{2} Arena	Alessia Cara	49,386 / 49,386	$3,275,562
April 17	London	United Kingdom	The O_{2} Arena	Alessia Cara	49,386 / 49,386	$3,275,562
April 19	London	United Kingdom	The O_{2} Arena	Alessia Cara	49,386 / 49,386	$3,275,562
North America
June 12	Portland	United States	Moda Center	Alessia Cara	12,527 / 12,527	$957,614
June 14	Vancouver	Canada	Rogers Arena	Alessia Cara	13,788 / 13,788	$1,025,320
June 16	Edmonton	Canada	Rogers Place	Alessia Cara	13,734 / 13,734	$1,033,430
June 17	Saskatoon	Canada	SaskTel Centre	Alessia Cara	11,878 / 11,878	$889,481
June 19	Winnipeg	Canada	Bell MTS Place	Alessia Cara	10,681 / 10,681	$976,945
June 21	Saint Paul	United States	Xcel Energy Center	Alessia Cara	13,891 / 13,891	$1,098,103
June 22	Des Moines	United States	Wells Fargo Arena	Alessia Cara	12,176 / 12,176	$677,199
June 24	Grand Rapids	United States	Van Andel Arena	Alessia Cara	10,328 / 10,328	$738,728
June 25	Milwaukee	United States	Fiserv Forum	Alessia Cara	10,512 / 10,512	$667,818
June 27	Rosemont	United States	Allstate Arena	Alessia Cara	25,445 / 25,445	$1,804,336
June 28	Rosemont	United States	Allstate Arena	Alessia Cara	25,445 / 25,445	$1,804,336
June 30	St. Louis	United States	Enterprise Center	Alessia Cara	12,868 / 12,868	$818,495
July 2	Denver	United States	Pepsi Center	Alessia Cara	12,260 / 12,260	$817,707
July 5	Los Angeles	United States	Staples Center	Alessia Cara	26,517 / 26,517	$2,038,588
July 6	Los Angeles	United States	Staples Center	Alessia Cara	26,517 / 26,517	$2,038,588
July 8	San Diego	United States	Pechanga Arena	Alessia Cara	10,469 / 10,469	$766,271
July 9	Glendale	United States	Gila River Arena	Alessia Cara	13,082 / 13,082	$980,179
July 11	Sacramento	United States	Golden 1 Center	Alessia Cara	12,369 / 12,369	$944,306
July 13	Oakland	United States	Oracle Arena	Alessia Cara	25,953 / 25,953	$1,848,134
July 14	Oakland	United States	Oracle Arena	Alessia Cara	25,953 / 25,953	$1,848,134
July 16	Salt Lake City	United States	Vivint Smart Home Arena	Alessia Cara	10,918 / 10,918	$817,950
July 19	Kansas City	United States	Sprint Center	Alessia Cara	12,596 / 12,596	$861,972
July 20	Tulsa	United States	BOK Center	Alessia Cara	11,767 / 11,767	$806,154
July 22	Dallas	United States	American Airlines Center	Alessia Cara	13,193 / 13,193	$982,510
July 23	San Antonio	United States	AT&T Center	Alessia Cara	13,227 / 13,227	$957,049
July 25	Houston	United States	Toyota Center	Alessia Cara	11,758 / 11,758	$869,326
July 27	Tampa	United States	Amalie Arena	Alessia Cara	13,101 / 13,101	$939,458
July 28	Miami	United States	American Airlines Arena	Alessia Cara	13,393 / 13,393	$1,009,350
July 30	Orlando	United States	Amway Center	Alessia Cara	13,105 / 13,105	$971,112
July 31	Atlanta	United States	State Farm Arena	Alessia Cara	11,312 / 11,312	$838,898
August 2	Nashville	United States	Bridgestone Arena	Alessia Cara	13,839 / 13,839	$1,026,276
August 3	Louisville	United States	KFC Yum! Center	Alessia Cara	15,040 / 15,040	$954,396
August 5	Detroit	United States	Little Caesars Arena	Alessia Cara	13,297 / 13,297	$1,006,441
August 6	Pittsburgh	United States	PPG Paints Arena	Alessia Cara	13,241 / 13,241	$985,008
August 10	Newark	United States	Prudential Center	Alessia Cara	24,786 / 24,786	$1,926,753
August 11	Newark	United States	Prudential Center	Alessia Cara	24,786 / 24,786	$1,926,753
August 13	Washington, D.C.	United States	Capital One Arena	Alessia Cara	14,114 / 14,114	$1,076,880
August 15	Boston	United States	TD Garden	Alessia Cara	24,948 / 24,948	$1,875,446
August 16	Boston	United States	TD Garden	Alessia Cara	24,948 / 24,948	$1,875,446
August 18	Ottawa	Canada	Canadian Tire Centre	Alessia Cara	12,852 / 12,852	$891,606
August 20	Montreal	Canada	Bell Centre	Alessia Cara	27,896 / 27,896	$2,076,660
August 21	Montreal	Canada	Bell Centre	Alessia Cara	27,896 / 27,896	$2,076,660
August 23	New York City	United States	Barclays Center	Alessia Cara	27,482 / 27,482	$2,037,257
August 24	New York City	United States	Barclays Center	Alessia Cara	27,482 / 27,482	$2,037,257
August 27	Columbus	United States	Nationwide Arena	Alessia Cara	12,435 / 12,435	$824,887
August 28	Philadelphia	United States	Wells Fargo Center	Alessia Cara	14,266 / 14,266	$1,087,128
August 30	Uncasville	United States	Mohegan Sun Arena	Alessia Cara	11,197 / 11,197	$1,055,302
August 31	Uncasville	United States	Mohegan Sun Arena	Alessia Cara	11,197 / 11,197	$1,055,302
September 6	Toronto	Canada	Rogers Centre	Alessia Cara	50,722 / 50,722	$3,443,823
Asia
September 25	Seoul	South Korea	KSPO Dome	—N/a	9,910 / 9,910	$920,599
September 28	Shanghai	China	Mercedes-Benz Arena	—N/a	10,371 / 10,371	$1,027,360
October 1	Bangkok	Thailand	IMPACT Arena	—N/a	9,033 / 9,033	$962,333
October 4	Singapore		Singapore Indoor Stadium	—N/a	8,619 / 8,619	$991,598
October 5	Kuala Lumpur	Malaysia	Axiata Arena	—N/a	9,528 / 9,528	$837,343
October 8	Bogor	Indonesia	Sentul Auditorium	—N/a	9,932 / 9,932	$1,114,132
October 10	Pasay	Philippines	Mall of Asia Arena	—N/a	9,291 / 9,291	$884,741
October 13	Macau		Cotai Arena	—N/a	9,638 / 9,638	$995,956
October 16	Yokohama	Japan	Yokohama Arena	—N/a	12,134 / 12,134	$1,423,318
Oceania
October 23	Perth	Australia	RAC Arena	Dan + Shay	12,223 / 12,477	$889,924
October 26	Adelaide	Australia	Adelaide Entertainment Centre	Dan + Shay	6,893 / 6,893	$499,967
October 29	Melbourne	Australia	Rod Laver Arena	Dan + Shay	35,640 / 35,640	$2,652,548
October 30	Melbourne	Australia	Rod Laver Arena	Dan + Shay	35,640 / 35,640	$2,652,548
October 31	Melbourne	Australia	Rod Laver Arena	Dan + Shay	35,640 / 35,640	$2,652,548
November 2	Sydney	Australia	Qudos Bank Arena	Dan + Shay	26,918 / 26,918	$2,204,040
November 3	Sydney	Australia	Qudos Bank Arena	Dan + Shay	26,918 / 26,918	$2,204,040
November 6	Brisbane	Australia	Brisbane Entertainment Centre	Ruel	8,201 / 8,201	$563,982
November 9	Auckland	New Zealand	Spark Arena	Ruel	11,456 / 11,456	$856,211
South America
November 29	São Paulo	Brazil	Allianz Parque	Lagum	33,569 / 33,569	$2,287,970
December 3	Rio de Janeiro	Brazil	Jeunesse Arena	Lagum	9,942 / 9,942	$683,915
December 6	Buenos Aires	Argentina	Movistar Arena	Chule Von Wernich	19,475 / 19,475	$1,110,190
December 7	Buenos Aires	Argentina	Movistar Arena	Chule Von Wernich	19,475 / 19,475	$1,110,190
December 10	Santiago	Chile	Movistar Arena	—N/a	21,455 / 21,455	$1,435,220
December 11	Santiago	Chile	Movistar Arena	—N/a	21,455 / 21,455	$1,435,220
December 14	Lima	Peru	Jockey Club Parcela H	Clara Yolks	15,769 / 15,769	$927,147
North America
December 17	Monterrey	Mexico	Auditorio Citibanamex	—N/a	6,138 / 6,138	$671,072
December 19	Mexico City	Mexico	Palacio de los Deportes	—N/a	42,860 / 43,489	$3,296,717
December 20	Mexico City	Mexico	Palacio de los Deportes	—N/a	42,860 / 43,489	$3,296,717
December 21	Mexico City	Mexico	Palacio de los Deportes	—N/a	42,860 / 43,489	$3,296,717
Total					1,314,973 / 1,315,856 (99.9328%)	$96,697,569

== Cancelled shows ==
List of cancelled concerts, showing date, city, country, venue, and reason for cancellation
Date (2019)	City	Country	Venue	Reason
November 30	São Paulo	Brazil	Allianz Parque	Laryngitis and sinus infection
