= What the Hell Are We Dying For? =

Single by Shawn Mendes
- Written: June 8, 2023
- Released: June 9, 2023
- Recorded: June 8, 2023
- Length: 3:49
- Label: Island
- Songwriters: Shawn Mendes; Mike Sabath; Eddie Benjamin; Scott Harris
- Producers: Mendes; Sabath

Shawn Mendes singles chronology
"When You're Gone" (2022)	"What the Hell Are We Dying For?" (2023)	"Witness Me" (2023)

"What the Hell Are We Dying For?" is a song by Canadian singer Shawn Mendes. It was released as a charity single through Island Records on June 9, 2023. The song was produced by Mendes himself and Mike Sabath, and they wrote it alongside Eddie Benjamin and Scott Harris.

== Background ==
When surprise-releasing it on June 9, 2023, Mendes explained its origin on social media: "Started writing this song yesterday morning with my friends in upstate New York & finished it only a few hours ago..felt so important to me to share with you guys in real time." He also announced a donation to Canadian Red Cross. The song's artwork features a picture of the New York City skyline hardly visible due to a shroud of smoke from the 2023 Canadian wildfires, which drew controversy.

== Credits and personnel ==
- Shawn Mendes – vocals, songwriting, production
- Mike Sabath – songwriting, production, drums
- Eddie Benjamin – songwriting, guitar, bass
- Scott Harris – songwriting, piano
- Andrew Maury – mixing
- John LaPorta – mastering
- Alex Pyle – recording

== Charts ==
Chart performance for "What the Hell Are We Dying For?"
Chart (2023)	Peak position
New Zealand Hot Singles (RMNZ)	28
South Korea BGM (Circle)	66

== Release history ==
Release dates and format(s) for "What the Hell Are We Dying For?"
Region	Date	Format(s)	Label	Ref.
Various	June 9, 2023	Digital download; streaming	Island	
