= Shawn Mendes (album) =

Studio album by Shawn Mendes
- Released: May 25, 2018
- Genre: Pop
- Length: 44:08
- Label: Island
- Producers: Teddy Geiger; Shawn Mendes; Ryan Tedder; Joel Little; John Mayer; Zach Skelton; Ian Kirkpatrick; Louis Bell; Nate Mercereau; Andrew Watt; Benny Blanco; Cashmere Cat; Ojivolta

Shawn Mendes chronology
MTV Unplugged (2017)	Shawn Mendes (2018)	Wonder (2020)

Singles from Shawn Mendes
- 1. "In My Blood" Released: March 22, 2018; 2. "Lost in Japan" Released: March 23, 2018; 3. "Youth" Released: May 3, 2018; 4. "Where Were You in the Morning?" Released: May 18, 2018; 5. "Nervous" Released: May 23, 2018

Shawn Mendes (alternatively Shawn Mendes: The Album) is the third studio album by Canadian singer Shawn Mendes, released through Island Records on May 25, 2018. It is primarily a pop record, with ingrained influences of pop rock, blues, and R&B. Mendes worked with Ryan Tedder, Julia Michaels, John Mayer, Ed Sheeran, Johnny McDaid, Camila Cabello, and Khalid. Among the producers are Tedder, Teddy Geiger, Louis Bell, Ian Kirkpatrick, with Mendes serving as an executive producer. It is a follow-up to his 2016 album Illuminate (2016). The album debuted at number one in Canada, making it Mendes' third number one album in his home country. It also debuted at the top of the US Billboard 200. It marked Mendes' third number one album in the US, making him the third youngest artist to top the chart at least three times. The album also topped the charts in Australia, Austria, Belgium, the Netherlands, Spain and Switzerland. It received generally positive reviews from music critics.

The lead single, "In My Blood" peaked at number 11 on the US Billboard Hot 100, and reached the top ten in several other countries. "In My Blood", "Lost in Japan", and "Youth" were certified gold or higher in Canada. The album was nominated for Best Pop Vocal Album and "In My Blood" for Song of the Year at the 61st Annual Grammy Awards.

On July 26, 2019, a deluxe version of the album including Mendes' "If I Can't Have You" and the Billboard Hot 100 number-one collaboration with singer Camila Cabello, "Señorita", were released on digital platforms and physical format in certain countries.

== Background ==
The album was recorded over three to four months, primarily at The Woodshed Studio in Malibu, California. Recording sessions also took place in Port Antonio, Jamaica. Mendes drew inspiration from music artists Justin Timberlake, Kings of Leon, Kanye West and Daniel Caesar while making the record. In an interview with The Recording Academy, he declared:

For me, it was just about exploring myself musically and not just sticking to one genre, and allowing myself to create the music that my heart really wanted to make and understanding that it's not about the genre but it's about the person and the cohesiveness within the stories I was telling and with my voice. That I'm really proud of. I'm proud of the fact that you can listen to the top of this album and hear a big rock anthem, and then halfway through you're in some kind of crazy slow R&B jam and then, at the very end, you're in the singer/songwriter world [...]

== Promotion ==
To announce the release date, album artwork, and title, Mendes hosted a 9-hour live video stream on YouTube, culminating on April 26, 2018, at midnight. The livestream featured a crew setting up a floral arrangement to recreate the album's cover.

In promotion of the album, Mendes played a concert at the Ford Theatres in Hollywood on May 17, which was live-streamed by Apple Music and followed by a Q&A with radio presenter Zane Lowe. In a surprise PR stunt, Mendes and his team made a stop at Simon Baruch Middle School in NYC, performing three acoustic songs off the new album. The recording of the performance, titled Shawn Mendes: Live In Los Angeles, was released by Apple Music.

Mendes also spent the week of June 4, 2018, on The Late Late Show with James Corden where he performed one of his new songs each night. The full week event was hashtagged as LateLateShawn on social media. He also did a Carpool Karaoke episode where he sang some of his new songs alongside his old ones.

Spotify invited Mendes’ fans for an intimate Spotify Fans First event held on July 19 at Beverly Hills, California.

To promote the album, Mendes embarked on his third solo world tour, called Shawn Mendes: The Tour.

== Singles ==
"In My Blood" was released on March 22, 2018, as the album's lead single, and sent to contemporary hit radio on March 27. "Lost in Japan" was released as the second single on March 23, 2018. "Youth", which features American singer Khalid, was released as the third single. "Where Were You in the Morning?" was released as the fourth single on May 18. "Nervous" was released as the fifth single on May 23. "If I Can't Have You" and "Señorita" were originally released as standalone singles on May 3, 2019, and June 21, 2019, respectively. They were later added to the deluxe edition of the album.

== Critical reception ==
Professional ratings
Aggregate scores
Source	Rating
Metacritic	73/100
Review scores
Source	Rating
AllMusic	4/5 stars
Billboard	(favourable)
The Guardian	3/5 stars
The Independent	4/5 stars
London Evening Standard	4/5 stars
NME	4/5 stars
Pitchfork	5.1/10
Rolling Stone	4/5 stars
South China Morning Post	4/5 stars
USA Today	(favourable)

Shawn Mendes received generally positive reviews from music critics, with particular praise towards Mendes' songwriting and artistic maturity compared to his previous work.

Ilana Kaplan from The Independent gave the album 4 of 5 stars, praising Mendes's maturity compared to his previous album: "With his latest effort, the 19-year-old singer moves beyond stereotypical relationship woes and goes for something more personal." In another positive review, Jem Aswad from Variety opined the album as a "remarkably well-crafted pop album that finds the singer trying on different styles, prominently showcasing his collaborators and making some flagrant references - yet his persona has become strong enough that he's never overpowered by any of it." Hannah Mylrea of NME complimented Mendes's growth, calling his rock- and funk-inspired sound "a bright and bold new direction." Mike Nied of Idolator called it his best album to date, in addition to one of the best of the year so far.

Jon Caramanica of The New York Times gave a mixed review, calling the album "appealing if not wholly engaging, full of pleasantly anonymous songs that systematically obscure Mr. Mendes's talents." Jamieson Cox of Pitchfork gave a rating of 5.1 out of 10, noting that Mendes's songs lack a unique sound, "and you can imagine them being recorded by anyone: Nick Jonas, Charlie Puth, a random choice from the One Direction diaspora." In a three-star review, The Guardian's Laura Snapes opined that Mendes's "attempt to detoxify pop masculinity is admirable, but you’re left yearning for a bit of rough and tumble."

Mark Kennedy of the Associated Press gave the album a positive review, praising the songwriting, hooks, as well as the duet with Khalid, but was unimpressed by "Like to Be You", the duet with singer Julia Michaels and "Fallin' All in You", co-written with Ed Sheeran and Johnny McDaid. Maeve McDermott of USA Today highlighted "In My Blood" as one of the best songs, saying the album "nails the innocence, thrills and pain that’s unique to being 19, alone and hopeful." In contrast, Brittany Spanos of Rolling Stone called "In My Blood" one of the album's weakest songs, favouring instead the collaborations with Michaels. Chris Gillet from South China Morning Post complimented Mendes' songwriting abilities as well, citing "Because I Had You", "Perfectly Wrong", and "When You're Ready" as the album's highlights, as well as acclaiming his vocal performance in "Perfectly Wrong," but was critical with "Queen" and "Fallin' All in You" labelling them "generic," he ended the review with awarding the album 4 out of 5 stars.

== Accolades ==
=== Awards and nominations ===
Year	Organization	Award	Result	Ref.
2018	People's Choice Awards	Album of 2018	Nominated	
2019	Grammy Awards	Best Pop Vocal Album	Nominated	

=== Year-end lists ===
Accolades for Shawn Mendes
Publication	List	Rank	Ref.
AllMusic	The AllMusic 2018 Year In Review: Favorite Pop Albums	—N/a	
Billboard	The 50 Best Albums of 2018	22	
City Pages	Every #1 album from 2018, ranked	23	
People	Top 10 Albums of 2018	8	
PopCrush	Best Albums of 2018	—N/a	
Rolling Stone	The 20 Best Pop Albums of 2018	9	
Time	The 10 Best Albums of 2018	4	
Uproxx	20 Must-Hear Pop Albums From 2018	8	
Young Post	The 20 best albums of 2018	16	

== Commercial performance ==
Shawn Mendes debuted at number one on the Billboard Canadian Albums Chart with 32,000 album-equivalent units, becoming Mendes' third Canadian number-one album. On October 3, 2018, Shawn Mendes was certified Platinum by Music Canada for shipments of 80,000 copies in the country.

Shawn Mendes debuted atop the ARIA Albums Chart, giving Mendes his first number-one album in Australia. On the UK Albums Chart, the album opened at number three, with first-week sales of 23,419.

Shawn Mendes debuted at number one on the US Billboard 200 with 182,000 album-equivalent units (including 142,000 pure album sales), becoming Mendes' third consecutive US number-one album. This feat made Mendes the third youngest artist to top the chart with at least 3 albums, along with Miley Cyrus and Justin Bieber. It also marks Mendes' best performing week ever, the fifth-best week of the year, and the second-biggest week for a pop album of the year, behind only Justin Timberlake's Man of the Woods. Additionally, it became the second most streamed pop album in 2018 for the first week, behind Timberlake, and the most streamed on the first week on Apple Music, surpassing Timberlake's record.

== Track listing ==
Credits adapted from iTunes Store metadata.

Shawn Mendes – Standard edition
No.	Title	Writer(s)	Producer(s)	Length
1.	"In My Blood"	Shawn Mendes; Teddy Geiger; Scott Harris; Geoff Warburton	Geiger; Mendes	3:31
2.	"Nervous"	Mendes; Harris; Julia Michaels	Geiger; Mendes	2:44
3.	"Lost in Japan"	Mendes; Geiger; Harris; Nathaniel Mercereau	Geiger; Mendes; Nate Mercereau^{[a]}; Louis Bell^{[a]}	3:21
4.	"Where Were You in the Morning?"	Mendes; Geiger; Harris; Warburton	Geiger; Mendes	3:20
5.	"Like to Be You" (featuring Julia Michaels)	Mendes; Michaels; Harris	John Mayer	2:39
6.	"Fallin' All in You"	Mendes; Ed Sheeran; Johnny McDaid; Fred Gibson; Harris; Geiger	Geiger; Mendes	3:55
7.	"Particular Taste"	Mendes; Ryan Tedder; Zach Skelton	Tedder; Skelton; Mendes	2:55
8.	"Why"	Mendes; Geiger; Harris	Geiger; Mendes	3:58
9.	"Because I Had You"	Mendes; Geiger; Tedder; Harris; Skelton	Geiger; Mendes; Tedder	2:22
10.	"Queen"	Mendes; Geiger; Harris; Warburton	Joel Little; Geiger	3:24
11.	"Youth" (featuring Khalid)	Mendes; Khalid Robinson; Harris; Warburton; Geiger	Little; Mendes	3:10
12.	"Mutual"	Mendes; Geiger; Warburton; Harris; Ian Kirkpatrick	Geiger; Mendes; Kirkpatrick^{[b]}	2:28
13.	"Perfectly Wrong"	Mendes; Geiger; Harris; Warburton	Geiger; Mendes	3:32
14.	"When You're Ready"	Mendes; Harris; Amy Allen; Warburton; Geiger	Geiger; Mendes	2:49
Total length:				44:08

Shawn Mendes – Target deluxe edition and Japan bonus tracks
No.	Title	Writer(s)	Producer(s)	Length
15.	"In My Blood" (Live Session)	Mendes; Warburton; Geiger; Harris	Mendes; Geiger	3:32
16.	"Where Were You in the Morning?" (Acoustic)	Mendes; Warburton; Geiger; Harris	Mendes; Geiger	2:58
Total length:				49:38

Shawn Mendes – International deluxe edition
No.	Title	Writer(s)	Producer(s)	Length
15.	"In My Blood" (Acoustic)	Mendes; Warburton; Geiger; Geiger; Harris	Zubin Thakkar	3:32
16.	"Youth" (Acoustic) (featuring Khalid)	Mendes; Robinson; Warburton; Geiger; Harris	Little; Mendes	3:09
Total length:				50:49

Shawn Mendes – Deluxe edition
No.	Title	Writer(s)	Producer(s)	Length
1.	"Señorita" (duet with Camila Cabello)	Mendes; Cabello; Charlotte Aitchison; Alexandra Tamposi; Jack Patterson; Andrew Wotman; Benjamin Levin; Magnus August Hoiberg	Watt; Benny Blanco; Cashmere Cat	3:10
2.	"Lost in Japan"	Mendes; Geiger; Harris; Nathaniel Mercereau	Geiger; Mendes; Nate Mercereau^{[a]}; Bell^{[a]}	3:21
3.	"If I Can't Have You"	Mendes; Geiger; Harris; Nathaniel Mercereau	Geiger; Mendes; Mercereau; Ojivolta	3:10
4.	"In My Blood"	Mendes; Geiger; Harris; Warburton	Geiger; Mendes	3:31
5.	"Fallin' All in You"	Mendes; Sheeran; McDaid; Gibson; Harris; Geiger	Geiger; Mendes	3:55
6.	"Where Were You in the Morning?"	Mendes; Geiger; Harris; Warburton	Geiger; Mendes	3:20
7.	"Nervous"	Mendes; Harris; Michaels	Geiger; Mendes	2:44
8.	"Like to Be You" (featuring Julia Michaels)	Mendes; Michaels; Harris	Mayer	2:39
9.	"Particular Taste"	Mendes; Tedder; Zach Skelton	Tedder; Skelton; Mendes	2:55
10.	"Because I Had You"	Mendes; Geiger; Tedder; Harris; Skelton	Geiger; Mendes; Tedder	2:22
11.	"Why"	Mendes; Geiger; Harris	Geiger; Mendes	3:58
12.	"Youth" (featuring Khalid)	Mendes; Robinson; Harris; Warburton; Geiger	Little; Mendes	3:10
13.	"Perfectly Wrong"	Mendes; Geiger; Harris; Warburton	Geiger; Mendes	3:32
14.	"Mutual"	Mendes; Geiger; Warburton; Harris; Kirkpatrick	Geiger; Mendes; Kirkpatrick^{[b]}	2:28
15.	"Queen"	Mendes; Geiger; Harris; Warburton	Little; Geiger	3:24
16.	"When You're Ready"	Mendes; Harris; Amy Allen; Warburton; Geiger	Geiger; Mendes	2:49
Total length:				50:28

Shawn Mendes – CD deluxe edition (bonus track)
No.	Title	Writer(s)	Producer(s)	Length
17.	"Lost in Japan" (Remix) (with Zedd)	Mendes; Geiger; Harris; Mercereau	Geiger; Mendes; Zedd; Mercereau^{[a]}; Bell^{[a]}	3:21
Total length:				53:49

Shawn Mendes – Japanese deluxe edition (bonus tracks)
No.	Title	Writer(s)	Producer(s)	Length
18.	"If I Can't Have You" (Gryffin Remix)	Mendes; Geiger; Harris; Mercereau	Geiger; Mendes; Mercereau; Ojivolta; Gryffin	4:13
19.	"There's Nothing Holdin' Me Back"	Mendes; Geiger; Harris; Warburton	Geiger; Andrew Maury	3:19
20.	"Treat You Better"	Mendes; Geiger; Harris	Geiger; Dan Romer; Daylight	3:07
21.	"Stitches"	Daniel Parker; Geiger; Daniel Kyriakides	Geiger; Parker; Daylight	3:26
22.	"In My Blood" (Acoustic)	Mendes; Warburton; Geiger; Geiger; Harris	Thakkar	3:32
Total length:				71:37

Spotify re-release
No.	Title	Writer(s)	Producer(s)	Length
1.	"In My Blood"	Mendes; Geiger; Harris; Warburton	Geiger; Mendes	3:31
2.	"Fallin' All in You"	Mendes; Sheeran; McDaid; Gibson; Harris; Geiger	Geiger; Mendes	3:55
3.	"Where Were You in the Morning?"	Mendes; Geiger; Harris; Warburton	Geiger; Mendes	3:20
4.	"Nervous"	Mendes; Harris; Michaels	Geiger; Mendes	2:44
5.	"Like to Be You" (featuring Julia Michaels)	Mendes; Michaels; Harris	Mayer	2:39
6.	"Lost in Japan"	Mendes; Geiger; Harris; Nathaniel Mercereau	Geiger; Mendes; Nate Mercereau^{[a]}; Bell^{[a]}	3:21
7.	"Particular Taste"	Mendes; Tedder; Zach Skelton	Tedder; Skelton; Mendes	2:55
8.	"Because I Had You"	Mendes; Geiger; Tedder; Harris; Skelton	Geiger; Mendes; Tedder	2:22
9.	"Why"	Mendes; Geiger; Harris	Geiger; Mendes	3:58
10.	"Youth" (featuring Khalid)	Mendes; Robinson; Harris; Warburton; Geiger	Little; Mendes	3:10
11.	"Queen"	Mendes; Geiger; Harris; Warburton	Little; Geiger	3:24
12.	"Perfectly Wrong"	Mendes; Geiger; Harris; Warburton	Geiger; Mendes	3:32
13.	"Mutual"	Mendes; Geiger; Warburton; Harris; Kirkpatrick	Geiger; Mendes; Kirkpatrick^{[b]}	2:28
14.	"When You're Ready"	Mendes; Harris; Amy Allen; Warburton; Geiger	Geiger; Mendes	2:49
Total length:				44:08

Shawn Mendes: The Album (Remixes)
No.	Title	Length
1.	"Where Were You in the Morning?" (Kaytranada Remix)	3:10
2.	"Why" (Remix) (featuring Leon Bridges)	3:54
3.	"Youth" (Remix) (featuring Khalid and Jessie Reyez)	3:21

Notes

- ^{^[a]} signifies an additional producer
- ^{^[b]} signifies a co-producer

== Charts ==
=== Weekly charts ===
Chart (2018–2019)	Peak position
Australian Albums (ARIA)	1
Austrian Albums (Ö3 Austria)	1
Belgian Albums (Ultratop Flanders)	1
Belgian Albums (Ultratop Wallonia)	4
Canadian Albums (Billboard)	1
Czech Albums (ČNS IFPI)	4
Danish Albums (Hitlisten)	2
Dutch Albums (Album Top 100)	1
Finnish Albums (Suomen virallinen lista)	6
French Albums (SNEP)	9
German Albums (Offizielle Top 100)	3
Hungarian Albums (MAHASZ)	9
Irish Albums (IRMA)	2
Italian Albums (FIMI)	2
Japan Hot Albums (Billboard Japan)	60
Japanese Albums (Oricon)	38
Mexican Albums (AMPROFON)	2
New Zealand Albums (RMNZ)	2
Norwegian Albums (VG-lista)	2
Polish Albums (ZPAV)	5
Portuguese Albums (AFP)	2
Scottish Albums (Official Charts)	4
South Korean Albums (Gaon)	46
South Korean International Albums (Circle)	2
Spanish Albums (Promusicae)	1
Slovak Albums (ČNS IFPI)	7
Swedish Albums (Sverigetopplistan)	5
Swiss Albums (Schweizer Hitparade)	1
UK Albums (Official Charts)	3
US Billboard 200	1

Chart (2025)	Peak position
Portuguese Streaming Albums (AFP)	162

=== Year-end charts ===
Chart (2018)	Position
Australian Albums (ARIA)	17
Austrian Albums (Ö3 Austria)	34
Belgian Albums (Ultratop Flanders)	27
Belgian Albums (Ultratop Wallonia)	125
Canadian Albums (Billboard)	19
Danish Albums (Hitlisten)	21
Dutch Albums (MegaCharts)	9
German Albums (Offizielle Top 100)	69
Italian Albums (FIMI)	82
Mexican Albums (AMPROFON)	20
New Zealand Albums (RMNZ)	24
South Korean International Albums (Gaon)	45
Spanish Albums (PROMUSICAE)	53
Swedish Albums (Sverigetopplistan)	32
Swiss Albums (Schweizer Hitparade)	58
UK Albums (OCC)	59
US Billboard 200	55

Chart (2019)	Position
Australian Albums (ARIA)	30
Belgian Albums (Ultratop Flanders)	39
Canadian Albums (Billboard)	12
Danish Albums (Hitlisten)	22
French Albums (SNEP)	123
Icelandic Albums (Plötutíóindi)	90
Mexican Albums (AMPROFON)	27
New Zealand Albums (RMNZ)	37
Swedish Albums (Sverigetopplistan)	56
US Billboard 200	38

Chart (2020)	Position
Australian Albums (ARIA)	76
Belgian Albums (Ultratop Flanders)	106
Canadian Albums (Billboard)	50
Dutch Albums (Album Top 100)	100
US Billboard 200	90

=== Decade-end charts ===
Chart (2010–2019)	Position
US Billboard 200	195

== Certifications ==
Region	Certification	Certified units/sales
Australia (ARIA)	2× Platinum	140,000^{‡}
Austria (IFPI Austria)	Platinum	15,000^{‡}
Belgium (BRMA)	Gold	10,000^{‡}
Brazil (Pro-Música Brasil)	Diamond	160,000^{‡}
Canada (Music Canada)	6× Platinum	480,000^{‡}
Denmark (IFPI Danmark)	2× Platinum	40,000^{‡}
France (SNEP)	2× Platinum	200,000^{‡}
Italy (FIMI)	Platinum	50,000^{‡}
Mexico (AMPROFON)	2× Platinum+Gold	150,000^{‡}
New Zealand (RMNZ)	2× Platinum	30,000^{‡}
Norway (IFPI Norway)	3× Platinum	60,000^{‡}
Poland (ZPAV)	4× Platinum	80,000^{‡}
Portugal (AFP)	Platinum	7,000^{‡}
Singapore (RIAS)	3× Platinum	30,000^{*}
Spain (Promusicae)	Gold	20,000^{‡}
Sweden (GLF)	Gold	15,000^{‡}
Switzerland (IFPI Switzerland)	Gold	10,000^{‡}
United Kingdom (BPI)	Platinum	300,000^{‡}
United States (RIAA)	Platinum	1,000,000^{‡}
^{*} Sales figures based on certification alone.^{‡} Sales+streaming figures based on certification alone.

== Release history ==
List of regions, release dates, formats, labels and references
Region	Date	Formats	Edition	Label	Ref.
Various	May 25, 2018	CD; vinyl; digital download; streaming	Standard	Island	
Japan	May 30, 2018	CD	Bonus Tracks	Universal Music Japan	
Various	July 26, 2019	Digital download; streaming	Deluxe	Island	
Japan, Brazil, Europe	October 9, 2019	CD	Deluxe	Universal	

== See also ==
- List of 2018 albums
- List of Billboard 200 number-one albums of 2018
- List of number-one albums of 2018 (Australia)
- List of number-one albums of 2018 (Austria)
- List of number-one albums of 2018 (Belgium)
- List of number-one albums of 2018 (Canada)
- List of number-one albums of 2018 (Spain)
- List of number-one albums of 2018 (Switzerland)
- List of UK top-ten albums in 2018
