= Nervous (Shawn Mendes song) =

Single by Shawn Mendes

from the album Shawn Mendes
- Released: May 23, 2018
- Genre: Pop; soul
- Length: 2:44
- Label: Island
- Songwriter(s): Shawn Mendes; Scott Harris; Julia Michaels
- Producer(s): Teddy Geiger; Shawn Mendes

Shawn Mendes singles chronology
"Where Were You in the Morning?" (2018)	"Nervous" (2018)	"Lost in Japan (Remix)" (2018)

Music video
- "Nervous" on YouTube

"Nervous" is a song by Canadian singer Shawn Mendes. It was written by Mendes, Scott Harris and Julia Michaels. It was produced by Teddy Geiger and Mendes. The song was released by Island Records on May 23, 2018, as the fifth single from Mendes' self-titled third studio album.

== Release ==
Mendes announced the released of the single on May 22, 2018, by posting its artwork and release date on his Instagram account.

== Music video ==
The music video was released on June 11, 2018, via the singer's official Vevo channel on YouTube. Lilliya Scarlett stars in the video.

== Personnel ==
Credits adapted from Tidal.

- Shawn Mendes – production, vocals, background vocals, guitar
- Teddy Geiger – production, keyboard, drums, guitar, percussion, programming
- Harry Burr – mixing assistance
- Nate Mercereau – bass
- Scott Harris – guitar, claps
- Andrew Maury – mixing

== Charts ==
Chart (2018–2019)	Peak position
Argentina Anglo (Monitor Latino)	11
Australia (ARIA)	51
Austria (Ö3 Austria Top 40)	39
Canada (Canadian Hot 100)	66
Germany (GfK)	86
Hungary (Rádiós Top 40)	35
Netherlands (Single Top 100)	38
New Zealand Heatseekers (RMNZ)	1
Slovakia (Rádio Top 100)	35
Slovenia (SloTop50)	22
Sweden (Sverigetopplistan)	71
Switzerland (Schweizer Hitparade)	59
UK Singles (OCC)	54
US Bubbling Under Hot 100 (Billboard)	8
Venezuela (National-Report)	88

== Certifications ==
Region	Certification	Certified units/sales
Australia (ARIA)	Platinum	70,000^{‡}
Brazil (Pro-Música Brasil)	Gold	20,000^{‡}
Canada (Music Canada)	Gold	40,000^{‡}
Mexico (AMPROFON)	Gold	30,000^{‡}
New Zealand (RMNZ)	Platinum	30,000^{‡}
^{‡} Sales+streaming figures based on certification alone.
