= Summer of Love (Shawn Mendes and Tainy song) =

2021 single by Shawn Mendes and Tainy

Single by Shawn Mendes and Tainy
- Released: August 20, 2021
- Genre: Pop
- Length: 3:04
- Label: Island
- Songwriters: Shawn Mendes; Marco Masís; Alejandro Borrero; Ivanni Rodríguez; Ido Zmishlany; Scott Harris; Sarah Solovay; Gregory Hein; Randy Class; Andrew Jackson
- Producers: Tainy; Neon16; Zmishlany (co.)

Shawn Mendes singles chronology
"Kesi" (remix) (2021)	"Summer of Love" (2021)	"It'll Be Okay" (2021)

Tainy singles chronology
"Una Más" (2021)	"Summer of Love" (2021)	"Lo Siento BB:/" (2021)

Music video
- "Summer of Love" on YouTube

"Summer of Love" is a song by Canadian singer Shawn Mendes and Puerto Rican record producer Tainy. It was released on August 20, 2021 by Island Records. Mendes solely handles vocals, while Tainy handles production alongside Neon16 and co-producer Ido Zmishlany.

== Background and promotion ==
On August 6, 2021, Mendes played a snippet of the song while driving a car. Two days later, which was Mendes' 23rd birthday, Mendes announced a release of the following week. Some lyrics were also teased. Mendes and Tainy announced the song on August 9, 2021. The song serves as the first collaboration between the two artists.

== Accolades ==
Awards and nominations for "Summer of Love"
Year	Organization	Award	Result	Ref(s)
2021	MTV Video Music Awards	Song of Summer	Nominated	

== Music video ==
The music video premiered simultaneously alongside the single on August 20, 2021. Directed by Matty Peacock, who previously worked with Mendes on the video for his 2020 single "Wonder", and filmed in Mallorca, Spain, the "dreamy visual" features the singer "experienc[ing] a care-free dream summer" and "living it up vacation style" with his friends. Scenes of them driving around in convertibles, "soaking up the sun" at the beach, swimming in the ocean, cliff jumping, and partying at a nightclub in a coastal town, are interspersed throughout. Shots of Mendes lying shirtless on a boat, and playing a guitar as he sings along to the song, are also shown.

=== Reception ===
Joshua Espinoza of Complex wrote that the video "perfectly captures the breezy, laidback vibes of the current season". Vulture's Charu Sinha commented that it "may as well be a commercial from the tourism board of Mallorca", and summarized it as "Hollister-style visuals of Mendes on a boat, Mendes on a beach, Mendes in a convertible, Mendes in a piazza, etc."

== Live performances ==
On September 12, 2021 Mendes and Tainy performed the song for the first time together at the 2021 MTV Video Music Awards. Mendes performed the song solo at BBC Radio 1's Live Lounge on September 14.

== Credits and personnel ==
Credits adapted from Tidal.

- Shawn Mendes – vocals, songwriting
- Tainy – production, songwriting, programming, mixing, studio personnel
- Neon16
  - Alejandro Borrero – production, songwriting
  - Ivanni Rodríguez – production, songwriting
- Ido Zmishlany – co-production, songwriting, recording, studio personnel
- Scott Harris – songwriting
- Solly – songwriting
- Aldae – songwriting
- Randy Class – songwriting
- Andrew Jackson – songwriting
- Chris Gehringer – mastering, studio personnel
- Natalia Ramirez – vocal engineering, studio personnel

== Charts ==
=== Weekly charts ===
Chart performance for "Summer of Love"
Chart (2021)	Peak position
Argentina Hot 100 (Billboard)	96
Australia (ARIA)	81
Austria (Ö3 Austria Top 40)	64
Belgium (Ultratop 50 Flanders)	18
Belgium (Ultratop 50 Wallonia)	24
Canada Hot 100 (Billboard)	17
Canada CHR/Top 40 (Billboard)	8
Canada Hot AC (Billboard)	13
Czech Republic Airplay (ČNS IFPI)	37
Czech Republic Singles Digital (ČNS IFPI)	49
Germany (GfK)	79
Global 200 (Billboard)	35
Hungary (Rádiós Top 40)	25
Hungary (Single Top 40)	12
Ireland (IRMA)	50
Lithuania (AGATA)	34
Netherlands (Dutch Top 40)	18
Netherlands (Single Top 100)	44
New Zealand Hot Singles (RMNZ)	10
Norway (VG-lista)	36
Poland Airplay (ZPAV)	5
Portugal (AFP)	62
San Marino (SMRRTV Top 50)	13
Slovakia (Singles Digitál Top 100)	34
South Africa (RISA)	71
Sweden (Sverigetopplistan)	48
Switzerland (Schweizer Hitparade)	44
UK Singles (Official Charts)	62
US Billboard Hot 100	48
US Adult Contemporary (Billboard)	20
US Adult Pop Airplay (Billboard)	15
US Pop Airplay (Billboard)	17

=== Year-end charts ===
Year-end chart performance for "Summer of Love"
Chart (2021)	Position
Poland (ZPAV)	68

== Certifications ==
Certifications for "Summer of Love"
Region	Certification	Certified units/sales
Australia (ARIA)	Platinum	70,000^{‡}
Austria (IFPI Austria)	Gold	15,000^{‡}
Brazil (Pro-Música Brasil)	Platinum	40,000^{‡}
Italy (FIMI)	Gold	50,000^{‡}
New Zealand (RMNZ)	Gold	15,000^{‡}
Poland (ZPAV)	Platinum	50,000^{‡}
Portugal (AFP)	Platinum	10,000^{‡}
Spain (Promusicae)	Gold	30,000^{‡}
^{‡} Sales+streaming figures based on certification alone.

== Release history ==
Release dates and formats for "Summer of Love"
Region	Date	Format	Label	Ref.
Various	August 20, 2021	Digital download; streaming	Island; Universal	
Italy	August 20, 2021	Contemporary hit radio	Universal	
United Kingdom	August 20, 2021	Contemporary hit radio	Island; Republic	
United States	August 24, 2021	Contemporary hit radio	Island; Republic	
