= Scott Harris (songwriter) =

American songwriter

- Genres: Pop; alternative; pop rock; progressive house; electro house; trap
- Occupations: Singer; songwriter
- Instruments: Vocals; piano; guitar
- Years active: 2011–present

Scott Harris Friedman is an American songwriter, producer and musician best known for his work with Shawn Mendes and co-writing the song "Don't Let Me Down" by the Chainsmokers featuring Daya, which reached No. 1 on the US Mainstream Top 40 chart in 2016.

== Career ==
Harris most recently executive produced Shawn Mendes' latest album, Shawn, Camila Cabello's album Familia (on which he co-wrote 8 songs), and co-wrote Role Model's single "Cross Your Mind," Shawn Mendes & Tainy's single "Summer Of Love," "As I Am (feat. Khalid)" for Justin Bieber and Dua Lipa's "We're Good." Harris co-wrote 12 songs on Shawn Mendes' fourth studio album, Wonder, 13 songs on Shawn's self-titled third studio album, Shawn Mendes, which debuted at No. 1 on the Billboard 200 chart, and 10 songs on Shawn Mendes' second album Illuminate including the lead single "Treat You Better" which reached the top 3 at the US Mainstream Top 40 chart, and "There's Nothing Holdin' Me Back which hit number 1 at the US Mainstream Top 40 chart.

== Songwriting discography ==
Year	Artist	Album	Song
2026	Mark Ambor	East Houston Tapes	"Everyone's Invited"
2026	Max McNown feat. Carly Pearce		"Not Falling Out"
2026	Moody Joody	Plain Jane	"Heart Shaped Bed"
2026	Moody Joody	Plain Jane	"Sweet Surrender"
2026	Moody Joody	Plain Jane	"Fantasy Land"
2026	Moody Joody	Plain Jane	"Little Blue House"
2026	Moody Joody	Plain Jane	"Suburbia"
2026	Moody Joody	Plain Jane	"OOPS!"
2026	Moody Joody	Plain Jane	"Loretta's Last Call"
2026	Max McNown	Leave On A Light	"Slow Down, Slow Down"
2026	Max McNown	Leave On A Light	"Same, Same Sun"
2026	Tiger Lewis	Lonely Guy	"Lonely Guy"
2026	Lukas Graham	Good Times	"Before You Go"
2026	Ellie Goulding	I Know Too Much	"Jealousy"
2026	Izzy Escobar		"Ego Talking"
2026	David Kushner	Devotion	"Electrified"
2026	David Kushner	Devotion	"If You Need Someone"
2026	Raynor		"Mirage"
2026	Koe Wetzel	The Night Champion	"Circus"
2026	Elena Rose		"Happy 🪽"
2026	Josiah and the Bonnevilles	As Is	"Carolina Heart"
2026	Max McNown		"Heart You Didn’t Break"
2026	Charlie Puth	Whatever's Clever! (Expanded)	"Reply To This"
2025	Meghan Trainor		"Still Don’t Care"
2025	LANY	Soft	"Good Parts"
2025	Henry Moodie	mood swings	"growing pains"
2025	Ava Max	Don't Click Play	"Lovin Myself"
2025	Ava Max	Don't Click Play	"Catch My Breath"
2025	Moody Joody		"OOPS!"
2025	eaj		"Ruin My Life"
2025	Sekou		"Never Gunna Give You Up"
2025	Midnight Til Morning		"Bye"
2025	Anyma, Ellie Goulding		"Hypnotized (feat. Ellie Goulding)"
2024	Shawn Mendes	Shawn	"Heart Of Gold"
2024	Shawn Mendes	Shawn	"Why Why Why"
2024	Shawn Mendes	Shawn	"Isn't That Enough"
2024	Shawn Mendes	Shawn	"Nobody Knows"
2024	Shawn Mendes	Shawn	"Who I Am"
2024	Shawn Mendes	Shawn	"That's The Dream"
2024	Shawn Mendes	Shawn	"Heavy"
2024	Shawn Mendes	Shawn	"That'll Be the Day"
2024	Shawn Mendes	Shawn	"The Mountain"
2024	Shawn Mendes	Shawn	"Rollin' Right Along"
2024	Moody Joody		
2024	Moody Joody		"Ground Control"
2024	Moody Joody		"Cuts Deep"
2024	Katy Perry	143	"Nirvana"
2024	Katy Perry	143	"Crush"
2024	Mike Posner		"Beautiful Day"
2024	Sofi Tukker	Bread	"Bread"
2024	Sofi Tukker	Bread	"Throw Some Ass"
2024	Sofi Tukker	Bread	"Hey Homie"
2024	Sofi Tukker	Bread	"Spiral"
2024	Role Model	Kansas Anymore	"Scumbag"
2024	Role Model	Kansas Anymore	"Superglue"
2024	Role Model	Kansas Anymore	"Compromise"
2024	Meghan Trainor	Timeless	"Sleepin' On Me"
2024	David Kushner		"Hero"
2024	David Kushner		"Darkerside"
2024	Alec Benjamin	12 Notes	"Sacrifice Tomorrow"
2024	Stephen Sanchez	Angel Face (Club Deluxe)	"The Other Side"
2024	Ludmilla x Ryan Castro		"Pina Colada"
2024	Lost Frequencies & David Kushner		"In My Bones"
2024	Dermot Kennedy		"Lessons"
2023	Moody Joody		"Velvet Connection"
2023	Del Water Gap ft. Holly Humberstone		"Cigarettes & Wine"
2023	Sofi Tukker		"Veneno"
2023	Jungkook		"Hate You"
2023	Paris Hilton, Steve Aoki		"Lighter"
2023	The Chainsmokers		"Summertime Friends"
2023	Holly Humberstone ft. D4VD		"Superbloodmoon"
2023	Del Water Gap		"All We Ever Do Is Talk"
2023	Louis The Child (with Claire Rosinkranz)		"Walls"
2023	Shawn Mendes		"WHAT THE HELL ARE WE DYING FOR ?"
2023	Surfaces		"Thankful"
2023	Freya Ridings	Perfect	"Can I Jump?"
2023	Ruel	4TH WALL	"Go On Without Me"
2023	Role Model		"a little more time"
2022	Tiesto & Tate McRae		"10:35"
2022	Half Alive	Conditions Of A Punk	"Did I Make You Up?"
2022	Half Alive	Conditions Of A Punk	"I'll Stop"
2022	Shawn Mendes	Lyle, Lyle, Crocodile Original Motion Picture Soundtrack	"Heartbeat"
2022	Role Model		"Cross Your Mind"
2022	Wrabel & Sadie Jean		"Hurts Like Hell"
2022	Madeline The Person	CHAPTER 3: The Burning	"Baby Boy"
2022	Dermot Kennedy	Sonder	"Any Love"
2022	Dermot Kennedy	Sonder	"Something to Someone"
2022	Dermot Kennedy	Sonder	"Dreamer"
2022	Dermot Kennedy	Sonder	"Divide"
2022	Dermot Kennedy	Sonder	"Homeward"
2022	Dermot Kennedy	Sonder	"Better Days"
2022	Dermot Kennedy	Sonder	"Already Gone"
2022	Dixie	A Letter To Me	"Girlfriend"
2022	Camila Cabello	Familia	"Celia"
2022	Camila Cabello	Familia	"psychofreak (feat. WILLOW)"
2022	Camila Cabello	Familia	"Bam Bam (feat. Ed Sheeran)"
2022	Camila Cabello	Familia	"Quiet"
2022	Camila Cabello	Familia	"Boys Don't Cry"
2022	Camila Cabello	Familia	"No Doubt"
2022	Camila Cabello	Familia	"Don't Go Yet"
2022	Camila Cabello	Familia	"everyone at this party"
2022	Shawn Mendes		"When You're Gone"
2021	Shawn Mendes		"It'll Be Okay"
2021	Noah Kahan	I Was / I Am	"Caves"
2021	Camila Cabello	Cinderella	"Million to One"
2021	Shawn Mendes and Tainy		"Summer of Love"
2021	Dan + Shay	Good Things	"Body Language"
2021	Dermot Kennedy		"Better Days"
2021	Camilo and Shawn Mendes		"Kesi" (Remix)
2021	Justin Bieber featuring Khalid	Justice	"As I Am"
2021	Quinn XCII	Change of Scenery II	"We Don't Talk Enough (with Alexander 23)"
2021	Quinn XCII	Change of Scenery II	"Feel Something"
2021	Dua Lipa	Future Nostalgia (The Moonlight Edition)	"We're Good"
2021	Fletcher		"Healing"
2020	Shawn Mendes	Wonder	"Wonder"
2020	Shawn Mendes	Wonder	"Intro"
2020	Shawn Mendes	Wonder	"Higher"
2020	Shawn Mendes	Wonder	"24 Hours"
2020	Shawn Mendes	Wonder	"Teach Me How To Love"
2020	Shawn Mendes	Wonder	"Call My Friends"
2020	Shawn Mendes	Wonder	"Dream"
2020	Shawn Mendes	Wonder	"Song For No One"
2020	Shawn Mendes	Wonder	"305"
2020	Shawn Mendes	Wonder	"Always Been You"
2020	Shawn Mendes	Wonder	"Piece Of You"
2020	Shawn Mendes	Wonder	"Look Up At The Stars"
2020	Noah Kahan		"Pride (Feat. mxmtoon)"
2020	MAX	Colour Vision	"Circles"
2020	Ant Saunders		"Effortless"
2020	Quinn XCII	A Letter to My Younger Self	"More Than Friends"
2020	JP Saxe		"Hey Stupid, I Love You"
2020	Dermot Kennedy	Without Fear	"Giants"
2020	Alec Benjamin	These Two Windows	"Match In The Rain"
2020	Alec Benjamin	These Two Windows	"Alamo"
2020	Kygo, Sasha Sloan	Golden Hour	"I'll Wait"
2020	Niall Horan	Heartbreak Weather	"Black and White"
2020	Niall Horan	Heartbreak Weather	"Dear Patience"
2020	Niall Horan	Heartbreak Weather	"Cross Your Mind"
2020	Niall Horan	Heartbreak Weather	"Everywhere"
2020	Billy Raffoul		"Swimming in the Deep End"
2020	Two Feet	PINK	"I Can Relate"
2020	Meghan Trainor	Treat Myself	"Nice to Meet Ya (feat. Nicki Minaj)"
2020	Wrabel		"hurts like hell"
2020	Selena Gomez	Rare	"Fun"
2020	Chelsea Cutler	How To Be Human	"Are You Listening?"
2019	Taylor Swift featuring Shawn Mendes		"Lover (Remix)"
2019	Bishop Briggs	Champion	"Can You Hear Me Now?"
2019	Bailey Bryan	Perspective	"Where We Started"
2019	Dermot Kennedy	Without Fear	"Redemption"
2019	Dermot Kennedy	Without Fear	"Outgrown"
2019	Dermot Kennedy	Without Fear	"The Corner"
2019	Dermot Kennedy	Without Fear	"Rome"
2019	Dermot Kennedy	Without Fear	"Power Over Me"
2019	Dermot Kennedy	Without Fear	"Outnumbered"
2019	Dermot Kennedy	Without Fear	"What Have I Done"
2019	Chance the Rapper	The Big Day	"Ballin Flossin"
2019	Kesha	The Angry Birds Movie 2: Original Motion Picture Soundtrack	"Best Day" (Angry Birds 2 Remix)
2019	Alexander23		"Sad"
2019	Julia Michaels	Inner Monologue Part 2	"Fucked Up, Kinda" (featuring Role Model)
2019	Noah Kahan	Busyhead	"Save Me"
2019	K.Flay	Solutions	"Sister"
2019	Kiiara		"Open My Mouth"
2019	Shawn Mendes	Shawn Mendes	"If I Can't Have You"
2019	James TW	Chapters	"Boys and Girls"
2019	P!nk featuring Khalid	Hurts 2B Human	"Hurts 2B Human"
2019	P!nk	Hurts 2B Human	"Walk Me Home"
2019	Justin Caruso, Ivy Adara	Ninjaworks (Vol.1)	"If We Stay (feat. Ivy Adara)"
2019	Aaron Carpenter		"Attitude"
2019	The Head and the Heart	Living Mirage	"Missed Connection"
2019	Martin Jensen and James Arthur		"Nobody"
2019	Ally Brooke featuring Tyga		"Low Key"
2019	Julia Michaels featuring Selena Gomez	Inner Monologue Part 1	"Anxiety"
2019	Matt Simons	After the Landslide	"Open Up"
2018	Quinn XCII feat. Noah Kahan	From Michigan with Love	"Tough"
2018	Plested	First & Foremost (EP)	"Your Name"
2018	Jonas Blue	Blue	"Come Through"
2018	Backstreet Boys	DNA	"Chances"
2018	Jon Bellion	Glory Sound Prep	"Blu"
2018	Gnash	We	"Nobody's Home"
2018	Quinn XCII	From Michigan with Love	"Sad Still"
2018	Dermot Kennedy	Without Fear	"Power Over Me"
2018	Michael Bublé	Love	"Love You Anymore"
2018	Max Frost	Gold Rush	"Stranger To Me Now"
2018	Emily Warren	Quiet Your Mind	"Hurt By You"
2018	Emily Warren	Quiet Your Mind	"Not Ready to Dance"
2018	Emily Warren	Quiet Your Mind	"Like That"
2018	Emily Warren	Quiet Your Mind	"As Long as I'm Alive"
2018	Emily Warren	Quiet Your Mind	"Just Click"
2018	Emily Warren	Quiet Your Mind	"Paranoid"
2018	Emily Warren	Quiet Your Mind	"Poking Holes"
2018	Alec Benjamin	Narrated for You	"Death of a Hero"
2018	Galantis		"Satisfied" feat. MAX
2018	Bebe Rexha	Expectations	"Don't Get Any Closer"
2018	Jason Mraz	Know	"Unlonely"
2018	Era Istrefi		"Prisoner"
2018	Chromeo	Head over Heels	"One Track Mind"
2018	Noah Kahan		"Come Down"
2018	Shawn Mendes	Shawn Mendes	"In My Blood"
2018	Shawn Mendes	Shawn Mendes	"Nervous"
2018	Shawn Mendes	Shawn Mendes	"Lost in Japan"
2018	Shawn Mendes	Shawn Mendes	"Where Were You in the Morning?"
2018	Shawn Mendes	Shawn Mendes	"Like To Be You" featuring Julia Michaels
2018	Shawn Mendes	Shawn Mendes	"Fallin' All in You"
2018	Shawn Mendes	Shawn Mendes	"Why"
2018	Shawn Mendes	Shawn Mendes	"Because I Had You"
2018	Shawn Mendes	Shawn Mendes	"Queen"
2018	Shawn Mendes	Shawn Mendes	"Youth" featuring Khalid
2018	Shawn Mendes	Shawn Mendes	"Mutual"
2018	Shawn Mendes	Shawn Mendes	"Perfectly Wrong"
2018	Shawn Mendes	Shawn Mendes	"When You're Ready"
2018	Anne-Marie	Speak Your Mind	"Trigger"
2018	Matt Simons	After the Landslide	"We Can Do Better"
2018	Felix Jaehn featuring Marc E. Bassy & Gucci Mane	I	"Cool"
2017	Betta Lemme		"Bambola"
2017	Don Diablo featuring A R I Z O N A		"Take Her Place"
2017	Noah Kahan		"Hurt Somebody"
2017	Quinn XCII	The Story of Us	"One Day at a Time"
2017	Quinn XCII	The Story of Us	"Walls"
2017	Astrid S		"Think Before I Talk"
2017	X Ambassadors		"Ahead of Myself"
2017	Ayokay featuring Baker Grace		"Too Young"
2017	3lau x Audien		"Hot Water"
2017	Emily Warren	Quiet Your Mind	"Hurt By You"
2017	Shawn Mendes	Illuminate	"There's Nothing Holdin' Me Back"
2017	Alessia Cara	The Get Down Part II Soundtrack	"The Other Side (Alessia Cara Version)"
2017	Ayokay featuring Chelsea Cutler		"The Shine"
2017	The Chainsmokers	Memories...Do Not Open	"The One"
2017	The Chainsmokers	Memories...Do Not Open	"Wake Up Alone" (featuring Jhené Aiko)
2017	Quinn XCII		"Make Time"
2017	J Sutta featuring Hopsin	I Say Yes	"Feel Nothing"
2016	Hot Shade featuring Mike Perry & JANE XØ		"Touching You Again"
2016	Naughty Boy featuring Kyla & Popcaan		"Should've Been Me"
2016	Lost Kings featuring Emily Warren		"Phone Down"
2016	Shawn Mendes	Illuminate	"Ruin"
2016	Shawn Mendes	Illuminate	"Treat You Better"
2016	Shawn Mendes	Illuminate	"Three Empty Words"
2016	Shawn Mendes	Illuminate	"Don't Be a Fool"
2016	Shawn Mendes	Illuminate	"No Promises"
2016	Shawn Mendes	Illuminate	"Lights On"
2016	Shawn Mendes	Illuminate	"Honest"
2016	Shawn Mendes	Illuminate	"Patience"
2016	Shawn Mendes	Illuminate	"Bad Reputation"
2016	Shawn Mendes	Illuminate	"Understand"
2016	The Chainsmokers	Collage	"Don't Let Me Down"
2016	Tiesto and Oliver Heldens featuring Natalie La Rose	–	"The Right Song"
2016	American Authors	What We Live For	"Mess With Your Heart"
2016	Sammy Adams	The Long Way	"Helluva"
2016	Handsome Ghost	The Brilliant Glow	"Graduate"
2016	Skizzy Mars	Alone Together	"Girl on a Train"
2015	Melanie Martinez	Cry Baby	"Tag, You're It"
2015	Shawn Mendes	Handwritten	"Life of the Party"
2015	Shawn Mendes	Handwritten	"Never Be Alone"
2015	Shawn Mendes	Handwritten	"Kid in Love"
2015	Shawn Mendes	Handwritten	"I Don't Even Know Your Name"
2015	Shawn Mendes	Handwritten	"Something Big"
2015	Shawn Mendes	Handwritten	"Strings"
2015	Shawn Mendes	Handwritten	"Aftertaste"
2015	Shawn Mendes	Handwritten	"Air"
2015	Shawn Mendes	Handwritten	"This is What it Takes"
2015	Shawn Mendes	Handwritten	"The Weight"
2015	Shawn Mendes	Handwritten	"Don't Want Your Love"
2015	Shawn Mendes	Handwritten	"Lost"
2015	Omi	Me 4 U	"Drop in the Ocean"
2015	Sabrina Carpenter	Eyes Wide Open	"White Flag"
2014	Christian Burghardt	Safe Place to Land EP	"Spark"
2014	Christian Burghardt	Safe Place to Land EP	"When She Cries"
2014	Oh Honey	With Love	"Get it Right"
2014	Niykee Heaton	Bad Intentions	"Villa"
2014	Jessie J	Sweet Talker	"Ain't Been Done"
2013	Krewella	Get Wet	"Pass the Love Around"
2011	Stephen Jerzak	Miles and Miles	"Party Like You're Single"
