= If I Can't Have You (Shawn Mendes song) =

Single by Shawn Mendes

from the album Shawn Mendes
- Released: May 3, 2019
- Recorded: 2019
- Genre: Pop rock; funk
- Length: 3:11
- Label: Island
- Songwriters: Shawn Mendes; Teddy Geiger; Scott Harris; Nate Mercereau
- Producers: Teddy Geiger; Shawn Mendes

Shawn Mendes singles chronology
"Lost in Japan (Remix)" (2018)	"If I Can't Have You" (2019)	"Señorita" (2019)

Music video
- "If I Can't Have You" on YouTube

"If I Can't Have You" is a song by Canadian singer Shawn Mendes. It was released as the lead single (sixth overall) from the deluxe edition of Mendes' self-titled third studio album through Island Records on May 3, 2019. The music video was released the same day. "If I Can't Have You" has reached number one in Hungary and China, as well as the top five in Australia, Austria, Canada, the Czech Republic, Denmark, Malaysia, New Zealand, Scotland, Slovakia, and the United States.

== Background ==
Mendes told Zane Lowe on the Beats 1 radio show that out of the 45 songs he has written in the last six months, which are stylistically "all over the place" and have "different vibes", "If I Can't Have You" was "the one consistently every time I played for myself and for friends and family was giving people that smile".

== Promotion ==
Mendes announced the release through his social media on May 1. He shared a link to the promotional website canthaveyou.com, which redirects to his webstore and offers the single as a 7-inch vinyl, cassette and CD single, with each format available in three versions containing a unique voice memo from Mendes. He performed the song for the first time during Saturday Night Live on May 4, 2019.

== Commercial performance ==
"If I Can't Have You" debuted at number two on both the Canadian Hot 100 and the US Billboard Hot 100, behind "Old Town Road" by Lil Nas X. It was Mendes' highest-charting hit in both countries at the time surpassing 2015's "Stitches", which peaked at number 4 in the US. "Señorita" became his highest-charting single later in the year.

== Music video ==
The music video was released on May 3, 2019, via the singer's official Vevo channel on YouTube. A lyric video was also released on May 6, 2019.

== Track listing ==
7-inch vinyl, cassette and CD single
No.	Title	Length
1.	"If I Can't Have You"	3:15
2.	"If I Can't Have You" (extended version)	4:00

Each version of the 7-inch, cassette and CD single contains one of three voice memos from Mendes.

Digital download and streaming
No.	Title	Length
1.	"If I Can't Have You"	3:10

== Credits and personnel ==
Credits adapted from Tidal.

- Shawn Mendes – vocals, songwriter, producer, programmer, guitar
- Teddy Geiger – songwriter, producer, drums, guitar, keyboards, programmer
- Scott Harris – songwriter, additional producer, guitar
- Nate Mercereau – songwriter, additional producer, guitar, bass guitar, piano
- Ojivolta – songwriter, additional producer
- Ray 'August Grant' Jacobs – backing vocals
- Raul Cubina – drums, percussion, programmer
- Ryan Svendsen – trumpet, flugelhorn
- Mark Williams – guitar, keyboards, programmer
- Zubin Thakkar – engineer, studio personnel
- George Seara – mixer, recording engineer, studio personnel
- Mike Gnocato – assistant mixer, studio personnel

== Charts ==
=== Weekly charts ===
Chart (2019)	Peak position
Argentina (Argentina Hot 100)	91
Australia (ARIA)	4
Austria (Ö3 Austria Top 40)	4
Belgium (Ultratop 50 Flanders)	11
Belgium (Ultratop 50 Wallonia)	11
Bolivia (Monitor Latino)	8
Canada Hot 100 (Billboard)	2
China Airplay/FL (Billboard)	1
Colombia (National-Report)	94
Croatia (HRT)	2
Czech Republic Airplay (ČNS IFPI)	67
Czech Republic Singles Digital (ČNS IFPI)	2
Denmark (Tracklisten)	5
Estonia (Eesti Tipp-40)	6
Finland (Suomen virallinen lista)	13
France (SNEP)	109
Germany (GfK)	14
Greece (IFPI)	4
Hungary (Editors' Choice Top 40)	13
Hungary (Single Top 40)	1
Hungary (Stream Top 40)	3
Iceland (Tónlistinn)	13
Ireland (IRMA)	7
Italy (FIMI)	31
Japan (Japan Hot 100)	27
Latvia (LAIPA)	5
Lithuania (AGATA)	4
Malaysia (RIM)	5
Mexico Airplay (Billboard)	12
Netherlands (Dutch Top 40)	8
Netherlands (Single Top 100)	11
New Zealand (Recorded Music NZ)	4
Norway (VG-lista)	11
Poland Airplay (ZPAV)	11
Portugal (AFP)	14
Puerto Rico (Monitor Latino)	18
Romania (Airplay 100)	80
Scottish Singles Sales (Official Charts)	3
Singapore (RIAS)	9
Slovakia Airplay (ČNS IFPI)	35
Slovakia Singles Digital (ČNS IFPI)	2
Slovenia (SloTop50)	9
South Korea (Gaon)	110
Spain (Promusicae)	56
Sweden (Sverigetopplistan)	10
Switzerland (Schweizer Hitparade)	8
UK Singles (Official Charts)	9
US Billboard Hot 100	2
US Adult Contemporary (Billboard)	12
US Adult Pop Airplay (Billboard)	1
US Dance Airplay (Billboard)	7
US Dance Club Songs (Billboard)	48
US Pop Airplay (Billboard)	4
US Rolling Stone Top 100	3

=== Year-end charts ===
Chart (2019)	Position
Australia (ARIA)	37
Austria (Ö3 Austria Top 40)	68
Belgium (Ultratop Flanders)	41
Belgium (Ultratop Wallonia)	90
Canada (Canadian Hot 100)	21
Denmark (Tracklisten)	47
Hungary (Single Top 40)	48
Latvia (LAIPA)	48
Netherlands (Dutch Top 40)	46
Netherlands (Single Top 100)	53
New Zealand (Recorded Music NZ)	46
Poland (ZPAV)	83
Portugal (AFP)	95
Sweden (Sverigetopplistan)	96
Switzerland (Schweizer Hitparade)	92
Tokyo (Tokio Hot 100)	20
UK Singles (Official Charts Company)	83
US Billboard Hot 100	29
US Adult Contemporary (Billboard)	25
US Adult Top 40 (Billboard)	10
US Dance/Mix Show Airplay (Billboard)	21
US Mainstream Top 40 (Billboard)	17
US Rolling Stone Top 100	71

== Certifications ==
Region	Certification	Certified units/sales
Australia (ARIA)	5× Platinum	350,000^{‡}
Austria (IFPI Austria)	Platinum	30,000^{‡}
Belgium (BRMA)	Gold	20,000^{‡}
Brazil (Pro-Música Brasil)	Diamond	160,000^{‡}
Canada (Music Canada)	5× Platinum	400,000^{‡}
Denmark (IFPI Danmark)	Platinum	90,000^{‡}
France (SNEP)	Gold	100,000^{‡}
Germany (BVMI)	Gold	200,000^{‡}
Italy (FIMI)	Gold	25,000^{‡}
New Zealand (RMNZ)	3× Platinum	90,000^{‡}
Poland (ZPAV)	Platinum	20,000^{‡}
Portugal (AFP)	Platinum	10,000^{‡}
Spain (Promusicae)	Gold	30,000^{‡}
United Kingdom (BPI)	Platinum	600,000^{‡}
United States (RIAA)	3× Platinum	3,000,000^{‡}
Streaming
Japan (RIAJ)	Platinum	100,000,000^{†}
^{‡} Sales+streaming figures based on certification alone.^{†} Streaming-only figures based on certification alone.

== Release history ==
Region	Date	Format	Label	Ref.
Various	May 3, 2019	Digital download; streaming	Island	
United States	May 7, 2019	Contemporary hit radio	Island	
