= In My Blood (Shawn Mendes song) =

2018 single by Shawn Mendes

Single by Shawn Mendes

from the album Shawn Mendes
- Released: March 22, 2018
- Genre: Rock; pop rock
- Length: 3:31
- Label: Island; Republic
- Songwriters: Shawn Mendes; Geoff Warburton; Teddy Geiger; Scott Harris
- Producers: Teddy Geiger; Shawn Mendes

Shawn Mendes singles chronology
"There's Nothing Holdin' Me Back" (2017)	"In My Blood" (2018)	"Lost in Japan" (2018)

Music video
- "In My Blood" on YouTube

"In My Blood" is a song recorded by Canadian singer Shawn Mendes. Written by Shawn Mendes, Geoff Warburton, Scott Harris and its producers Teddy Geiger, it was released by Island Records on March 22, 2018, as the lead single from Mendes' self-titled third studio album. It was nominated for Song of the Year at the 61st Annual Grammy Awards, and won Single of the Year at the Juno Awards of 2019. "In My Blood" also won Choice pop song at the Teen Choice Awards. Commercially, the song reached number one in Hungary, the top 10 in twelve additional countries, and number 11 in the United States.

== Background ==
"In My Blood" chronicles Mendes' struggle with anxiety. It marks the first time the singer has publicly discussed his experiences with mental health issues.

== Release and promotion ==
On March 16, 2018, Mendes posted a collage on social media consisting of two uncaptioned images of blank color blocks after he wrote the song, one in beige and one in coral. He later changed his profile picture to a beige background color with a floral design, as featured in the single's artwork.

On March 19, Mendes partnered with Spotify to promote the single on a billboard in New York's Times Square that reads "Shawn Mendes coming soon". Shortly after, he posted a video that includes two dates: March 22 and March 23. The dates were also projected in various places in London.

He officially announced the song on March 20, along with its release date and the single's artwork. "This song," he wrote in a social media post, "is the closest song to my heart that I've ever written". A Portuguese version was also released on June 3, 2018, in support of Portugal at the 2018 FIFA World Cup in Russia, owing to Mendes' Portuguese heritage.

== Composition ==
"In My Blood" has been classified as a ballad in the rock or pop rock genre, whose acoustic opening was described as "soft and despairing". As the song progresses, "an insistent drum comes in" before Mendes' voice rises on the chorus. A Rolling Stone contributor noted that the chorus features "shuddering drums" and "throbbing electric guitars", with "choral backing vocals" that "add soothing textures to the final hook". Sheet music for "In My Blood" is in the key of F major and a tempo of 70 beats per minute, while Mendes's vocals span from A3 to Bb5.

== Critical reception ==
Jon Caramanica from The New York Times opined it as a standout in comparison to Mendes' previous singles, referring to how "scarred and forlorn" he sounds while commending his songwriting ability. Hugh McIntyre of Forbes.com noted that the song is an evolution of Mendes' well-known sound, beginning with "a familiar acoustic guitar". He wrote that Mendes has adopted "a more mature Kings of Leon-type sound", calling the song "a job well done".

Mike Nied of Idolator opined that "the sweeping anthem offers an intimate glimpse into his deepest thoughts", with a radio-friendly pop rock instrumental, adding that the song "sounds like another sure-fire smash". He concluded by calling it "a moving and inspiring track and a wonderful taste of things to come". Gil Kaufman of Billboard deemed the song "one of Mendes' most mature efforts to date". In another Billboard article, Abby Jones listed it as his best single to date. Fuse's Jeff Benjamin praised the song's mature themes and deemed it an "arena-rock anthem."

== Chart performance ==
It debuted at number 72 on the US Billboard Hot 100 after only one day of sales and streaming tracking and four days of airplay tracking. It later rose to number 11. Mendes became the first artist to have four number-one songs on the Billboard Adult Top 40 radio airplay chart before turning 20 years old, with "In My Blood" being his fourth.

In Canada, the single debuted at 62 also after one day of tracking. The following week, it rose 53 spots to a new peak of 9, making it Mendes' fifth top 10 in his home country. It went number one in Hungary and reached the top 10 of several European and Asian countries.

In the United Kingdom, "In My Blood" debuted at Number 13 after one week of sales and fluctuated up and down the Top 20 before ultimately reaching its peak at 10 at the end of May. The song spent 13 weeks in the UK Top 40 and was Mendes' fifth top ten hit in the region.

== Music video ==
The music video for the song was uploaded on April 24, 2018. Directed by Jay Martin, the video features Shawn Mendes lying on the floor barefoot, while his surroundings begin to change. As he sings, it begins to snow and rain. The video ends with a wide shot of Mendes surrounded by a garden of flowers.

== Live performances ==
On March 28, 2018, Mendes made a live performance debut of the song on The Late Late Show with James Corden. On April 12, Mendes performed the song live during the German Echo Music Prize. Mendes performed the song several times in the UK, including at the BBC Radio Live Lounge on April 19, on Sounds Like Friday Night on April 20, and at Queen Elizabeth II's 92nd birthday concert at the Royal Albert Hall in London on April 21. On April 24, Mendes performed the song at the TIME 100 Gala.

Mendes's performance of the song on The Ellen DeGeneres Show aired on May 17, and he performed the song at the 2018 Billboard Music Awards on May 20. He performed the song on The One Show on May 28, and as part of his set at BBC Music's Biggest Weekend in Swansea on May 27. Mendes also performed the song as part of his sets on Today and at the Governors Ball Music Festival, both on June 1 in New York City, and at Wango Tango the next day in Los Angeles. He performed the song at the 2018 MTV Video Music Awards held in New York on August 20. In February 2019, he performed the song with Miley Cyrus at the 61st Annual Grammy Awards. In May 2019, he performed the song on Saturday Night Live.

== Track listing ==
- Digital download
1. "In My Blood" – 3:31
- Digital download – acoustic
1. "In My Blood" (acoustic) – 3:32
- Digital download – Portuguese version
1. "In My Blood" (Portuguese version) – 3:32

== Credits and personnel ==
Credits adapted from Tidal.

- Shawn Mendes – composition, production, vocals, guitar
- Geoff Warburton – composition, guitar
- Teddy Geiger – composition, production, guitar, keyboard, piano, bass, drums, programming, background vocals
- Scott Harris – composition, guitar
- Harry Burr – mixing assistance
- Andrew Maury – mixing
- Joe LaPorta – mastering

== Charts ==
=== Weekly charts ===
Chart (2018–2019)	Peak position
Australia (ARIA)	9
Austria (Ö3 Austria Top 40)	5
Belgium (Ultratop 50 Flanders)	8
Belgium (Ultratop 50 Wallonia)	21
Canada Hot 100 (Billboard)	9
Canada AC (Billboard)	3
Canada CHR/Top 40 (Billboard)	8
Canada Hot AC (Billboard)	2
Czech Republic Airplay (ČNS IFPI)	67
Czech Republic Singles Digital (ČNS IFPI)	3
Denmark (Tracklisten)	12
Dominican Republic (SODINPRO)	39
Dominican Republic Anglo (Monitor Latino)	9
Ecuador (National-Report)	57
Finland (Suomen virallinen lista)	15
France (SNEP)	107
Germany (GfK)	8
Greece Digital Songs (IFPI Greece)	3
Guatemala Anglo (Monitor Latino)	3
Hungary (Rádiós Top 40)	33
Hungary (Single Top 40)	1
Hungary (Stream Top 40)	2
Ireland (IRMA)	13
Italy (FIMI)	35
Japan Hot 100 (Billboard)	39
Lebanon (Lebanese Top 20)	4
Malaysia (RIM)	4
Mexico Airplay (Billboard)	41
Netherlands (Dutch Top 40)	6
Netherlands (Single Top 100)	13
New Zealand (Recorded Music NZ)	13
Norway (VG-lista)	10
Panama Anglo (Monitor Latino)	6
Poland Airplay (ZPAV)	17
Portugal (AFP)	3
Romania (Airplay 100)	94
Scotland Singles (Official Charts)	2
Slovakia Airplay (ČNS IFPI)	57
Slovakia Singles Digital (ČNS IFPI)	2
Slovenia (SloTop50)	6
Spain (PROMUSICAE)	42
Sweden (Sverigetopplistan)	11
Switzerland (Schweizer Hitparade)	5
UK Singles (Official Charts)	10
US Billboard Hot 100	11
US Adult Contemporary (Billboard)	7
US Adult Pop Airplay (Billboard)	1
US Dance Airplay (Billboard)	21
US Pop Airplay (Billboard)	7
US Radio Songs (Billboard)	7

=== Year-end charts ===
Chart (2018)	Position
Australia (ARIA)	65
Austria (Ö3 Austria Top 40)	59
Belgium (Ultratop Flanders)	28
Belgium (Ultratop Wallonia)	73
Canada (Canadian Hot 100)	34
Denmark (Tracklisten)	46
Germany (Official German Charts)	89
Hungary (Single Top 40)	59
Iceland (Plötutíóindi)	21
Netherlands (Dutch Top 40)	29
Netherlands (Single Top 100)	68
Portugal (AFP)	33
Slovenia (SloTop50)	34
Sweden (Sverigetopplistan)	92
Switzerland (Schweizer Hitparade)	41
Taiwan (Hito Radio)	48
UK Singles (Official Charts Company)	74
US Billboard Hot 100	46
US Adult Contemporary (Billboard)	20
US Adult Top 40 (Billboard)	10
US Mainstream Top 40 (Billboard)	30
US Radio Songs (Billboard)	28
Chart (2019)	Position
Portugal (AFP)	178
US Adult Contemporary (Billboard)	19

== Certifications ==
Region	Certification	Certified units/sales
Australia (ARIA)	5× Platinum	350,000^{‡}
Austria (IFPI Austria)	Platinum	30,000^{‡}
Belgium (BRMA)	Gold	10,000^{‡}
Brazil (Pro-Música Brasil)	2× Diamond	320,000^{‡}
Canada (Music Canada)	6× Platinum	480,000^{‡}
Denmark (IFPI Danmark)	Platinum	90,000^{‡}
France (SNEP)	Platinum	200,000^{‡}
Germany (BVMI)	Gold	200,000^{‡}
Italy (FIMI)	Platinum	50,000^{‡}
Mexico (AMPROFON)	Platinum+Gold	90,000^{‡}
New Zealand (RMNZ)	3× Platinum	90,000^{‡}
Norway (IFPI Norway)	Platinum	60,000^{‡}
Poland (ZPAV)	2× Platinum	100,000^{‡}
Portugal (AFP)	2× Platinum	20,000^{‡}
Spain (Promusicae)	Platinum	60,000^{‡}
United Kingdom (BPI)	Platinum	600,000^{‡}
United States (RIAA)	2× Platinum	2,000,000^{‡}
^{‡} Sales+streaming figures based on certification alone.

== Release history ==
Region	Date	Format	Version	Label	Ref.
Various	March 22, 2018	Digital download	Original	Island	
Australia	March 23, 2018	Contemporary hit radio	Original	Universal Music Australia	
United States	March 27, 2018	Contemporary hit radio	Original	Island; Republic	
Italy	March 30, 2018	Contemporary hit radio	Original	Universal	
Various	May 11, 2018	Digital download	Acoustic	Island	
