= Where Were You in the Morning? =

Single by Shawn Mendes

from the album Shawn Mendes
- Released: May 18, 2018
- Length: 3:20
- Label: Island
- Songwriters: Shawn Mendes; Teddy Geiger; Geoff Warburton; Scott Harris
- Producers: Teddy Geiger; Shawn Mendes

Shawn Mendes singles chronology
"Youth" (2018)	"Where Were You in the Morning?" (2018)	"Nervous" (2018)

"Where Were You in the Morning?" is a song by Canadian singer Shawn Mendes. Written by Geoff Warburton, Scott Harris and its producers Teddy Geiger and Mendes, it was released by Island Records on May 18, 2018, as the fourth single from Mendes' self-titled third studio album.

== Release ==
Mendes first teased the song on May 16, 2018, by posting its artwork and release date on social media. On May 17, 2018, the Canadian singer first premiered it live alongside John Mayer during Apple Music's One Night Only event. On December 21, 2018, Mendes released a version of the song remixed by Kaytranada.

== Composition ==
"Where Were You in the Morning?" is a hybrid of pop and R&B with an "atmospheric" production, featuring a "bluesy, soulful guitar" and handclaps. It also resembles Mendes's idol John Mayer's work. According to Billboard's Lars Brandle, the song is "Mendes' melancholy tale of a one-night stand who bailed on him the next morning without so much as a good-bye".

== Personnel ==
Credits adapted from Tidal.

- Shawn Mendes – production, vocals, background vocals, guitar
- Teddy Geiger – production, keyboard, background vocals, guitar, programming
- Harry Burr – mixing assistance
- Nate Mercereau – bass, guitar
- Scott Harris – guitar
- Andrew Maury – mixing

== Charts ==
Chart (2018)	Peak position
Australia (ARIA)	67
Austria (Ö3 Austria Top 40)	54
Canada Hot 100 (Billboard)	81
Czech Republic Singles Digital (ČNS IFPI)	54
France (SNEP)	153
Hungary (Single Top 40)	9
Ireland (IRMA)	79
Netherlands (Single Top 100)	44
New Zealand Heatseekers (RMNZ)	6
Portugal (AFP)	50
Scottish Singles Sales (Official Charts)	57
Slovakia Singles Digital (ČNS IFPI)	47
Sweden (Sverigetopplistan)	93
Switzerland (Schweizer Hitparade)	71
UK Singles (Official Charts)	91

== Certifications ==
Region	Certification	Certified units/sales
Australia (ARIA)	Gold	35,000^{‡}
Canada (Music Canada)	Gold	40,000^{‡}
New Zealand (RMNZ)	Gold	15,000^{‡}
^{‡} Sales+streaming figures based on certification alone.
