= Lost in Japan =

2018 song by Shawn Mendes

Single by Shawn Mendes

from the album Shawn Mendes
- Released: March 23, 2018
- Genre: Funk; pop; R&B
- Length: 3:20
- Label: Island
- Songwriter(s): Shawn Mendes; Scott Harris; Nate Mercereau; Teddy Geiger
- Producer(s): Teddy Geiger; Shawn Mendes; Nate Mercereau (add.); Louis Bell (add.)

Shawn Mendes singles chronology
"In My Blood" (2018)	"Lost in Japan" (2018)	"Youth" (2018)

"Lost in Japan" is a song recorded by Canadian singer Shawn Mendes. It was written by Mendes, Scott Harris, Nate Mercereau and Teddy Geiger, with production handled by Mendes, Mercereau, Geiger and Louis Bell. The song was released by Island Records on March 23, 2018, as a second single for Mendes' self-titled third studio album. An official remix by German music producer Zedd was released on September 27, 2018.

== Release ==
The song's title was first spotted in the background of Mendes' Instagram posts from when he was recording the album in Jamaica, leading to speculation on the possibility of Mendes releasing two singles, hence the two dates in an earlier teaser. He announced the song mere hours after the release of "In My Blood", writing on Twitter: "Wanted to give you another song".

== Composition ==
"Lost in Japan" is a funk, pop and R&B song, with "funky strings and driving bass" that bears resemblances to the work of Justin Timberlake. During interviews, Mendes stated that he was inspired by all of the Timberlake songs he was listening to at the time, especially Justified–and a dream. "I had this dream that I was lost in this country and I woke up the next day and we had this cool piano part and the song was birthed."

Lars Brandle of Billboard wrote that the song "opens with a subtle spell of piano then changes gears with a fat bass sound and groove". It transformed from "a slow, piano-driven number" into "a passionate, hook-laden love song", according to CBS Radio's Robyn Collins. Lyrically, Mendes offers to travel the globe in order to be closer to his love interest. Sheet music for the song "Lost In Japan" is in the key of B♭ Major and a tempo range of 104-108 beats per minute, while Mendes's vocals span from G3 to C6.

== Critical reception ==
Mike Nied of Idolator regarded the "atmospheric" song as "another solid gold bop", complimenting its ability "to present a new, more mature version of the superstar". Sam Damshenas of Gay Times opined that the song "displays a saucier, funkier side" to Mendes. Jordan Sargent of Spin praised the track, deeming it "notably well-made pop music" and "refreshingly spacious", despite being ambivalent towards his previous single "In My Blood". Billboard named it the 22nd best song of the first half of 2018, Elle considered it the 2nd, while Uproxx listed it at No. 8 for the best pop songs of 2018.

== Credits and personnel ==
Credits adapted from Tidal.

- Shawn Mendes – vocals, background vocals, songwriting, production, guitar
- Scott Harris – songwriting, guitar
- Nate Mercereau – songwriting, additional production, keyboard, bass, guitar, percussion, piano
- Teddy Geiger – background vocals, songwriting, production, drums, guitar, percussion, programming
- Louis Bell – additional production
- Harry Burr – mixing assistance, studio personnel
- Andrew Maury – mixing, studio personnel
- George Seara – vocal engineering, studio personnel

== Charts ==
=== Weekly charts ===
Chart (2018–19)	Peak position
Australia (ARIA)	27
Austria (Ö3 Austria Top 40)	26
Belgium (Ultratip Bubbling Under Flanders)	15
Brazil International Pop Songs (Crowley Charts)	9
Canada (Canadian Hot 100)	39
CIS Airplay (TopHit)	24
Czech Republic (Singles Digitál Top 100)	23
Denmark (Tracklisten)	20
Germany (GfK)	69
Hungary (Single Top 40)	2
Hungary (Stream Top 40)	9
Ireland (IRMA)	35
Italy (FIMI)	67
Netherlands (Single Top 100)	45
New Zealand (Recorded Music NZ)	32
Portugal (AFP)	26
Russia Airplay (TopHit) Remix	17
Scotland (OCC)	21
Slovakia (Rádio Top 100)	44
Slovakia (Singles Digitál Top 100)	11
Sweden (Sverigetopplistan)	55
Switzerland (Schweizer Hitparade)	23
UK Singles (OCC)	30
US Billboard Hot 100	48
US Pop Airplay (Billboard)	15

=== Year-end charts ===
Chart (2018)	Position
Portugal (AFP)	161
Chart (2019)	Position
Portugal (AFP)	141

== Certifications ==
Region	Certification	Certified units/sales
Australia (ARIA)	4× Platinum	280,000^{‡}
Austria (IFPI Austria)	Gold	15,000^{‡}
Canada (Music Canada)	4× Platinum	320,000^{‡}
Denmark (IFPI Danmark)	Platinum	90,000^{‡}
Italy (FIMI)	Platinum	50,000^{‡}
Mexico (AMPROFON)	Platinum	60,000^{‡}
New Zealand (RMNZ)	3× Platinum	90,000^{‡}
Poland (ZPAV)	2× Platinum	100,000^{‡}
Portugal (AFP)	Platinum	10,000^{‡}
Spain (PROMUSICAE)	Gold	30,000^{‡}
United Kingdom (BPI)	Platinum	600,000^{‡}
United States (RIAA)	2× Platinum	2,000,000^{‡}
^{‡} Sales+streaming figures based on certification alone.

== Release history ==
Region	Date	Format	Label	Ref.
Various	March 23, 2018	Digital download; streaming	Island	
Italy	September 28, 2018	Contemporary hit radio	Universal	

== Zedd remix ==
"Lost in Japan" (remix)

Single by Shawn Mendes and Zedd
- Released: September 27, 2018
- Length: 3:21
- Label: Island
- Songwriter(s): Shawn Mendes; Scott Harris; Nate Mercereau; Teddy Geiger
- Producer(s): Zedd (add.); Teddy Geiger; Shawn Mendes; Nate Mercereau (add.); Louis Bell (add.)

Shawn Mendes singles chronology
"Nervous" (2018)	"Lost in Japan" (remix) (2018)	"If I Can't Have You" (2019)

Zedd singles chronology
"Happy Now" (2018)	"Lost in Japan" (remix) (2018)	"365" (2019)

Music video
- "Lost in Japan" on YouTube

A remix of "Lost in Japan" by Zedd was released on September 27, 2018, and was sent to the US contemporary hit radio on October 2, 2018.

=== Music video ===
A music video for the song was released on October 25, 2018. The video features both the original and remix versions of the song. The music video reenacts scenes from the 2003 film Lost in Translation, where Mendes plays the role of Bob (originally portrayed by Bill Murray). It features guest appearances from Norwegian actress Alisha Boe (who plays Scarlett Johansson's character Charlotte) and remixer Zedd. The music video was directed by Jay Martin and shot by Kai Saul.

=== Credits and personnel ===
Credits adapted from Tidal.

- Shawn Mendes – vocals, background vocals, songwriting, production, guitar
- Scott Harris – songwriting, guitar
- Nate Mercereau – songwriting, additional production, keyboard, bass, guitar, percussion, piano
- Teddy Geiger – background vocals, songwriting, production, drums, guitar, percussion, programming
- Louis Bell – additional production
- Harry Burr – mixing assistance, studio personnel
- Andrew Maury – mixing, studio personnel
- George Seara – vocal engineering, studio personnel
- Zedd – additional production, remixing, studio personnel

=== Charts ===
Chart (2018)	Peak position
Belgium (Ultratop 50 Flanders) Remix	25
Belgium (Ultratip Bubbling Under Wallonia) Remix	10
Canada (Canadian Hot 100)	22
Canada AC (Billboard)	18
Canada CHR/Top 40 (Billboard)	15
Canada Hot AC (Billboard)	12
Colombia (National-Report)	64
Croatia (HRT)	65
Mexico Airplay (Billboard)	15
Netherlands (Dutch Top 40)	19
Netherlands (Single Top 100) Remix	42
New Zealand Hot Singles (RMNZ)	4
Poland (Polish Airplay Top 100)	9
Romania (Airplay 100)	64
Slovenia (SloTop50)	48
Sweden (Sverigetopplistan)	94
US Billboard Hot 100	48
US Adult Contemporary (Billboard)	30
US Adult Pop Airplay (Billboard)	16
US Pop Airplay (Billboard)	15
Venezuela (National-Report)	19

=== Release history ===
Region	Date	Format	Label	Ref.
Various	September 27, 2018	Digital download; streaming	Island	
Italy	September 28, 2018	Contemporary hit radio	Universal	
United Kingdom	September 29, 2018	Contemporary hit radio	Island	
United States	October 2, 2018	Contemporary hit radio	Island	
