= Teddy Geiger =

American singer-songwriter (born 1988)

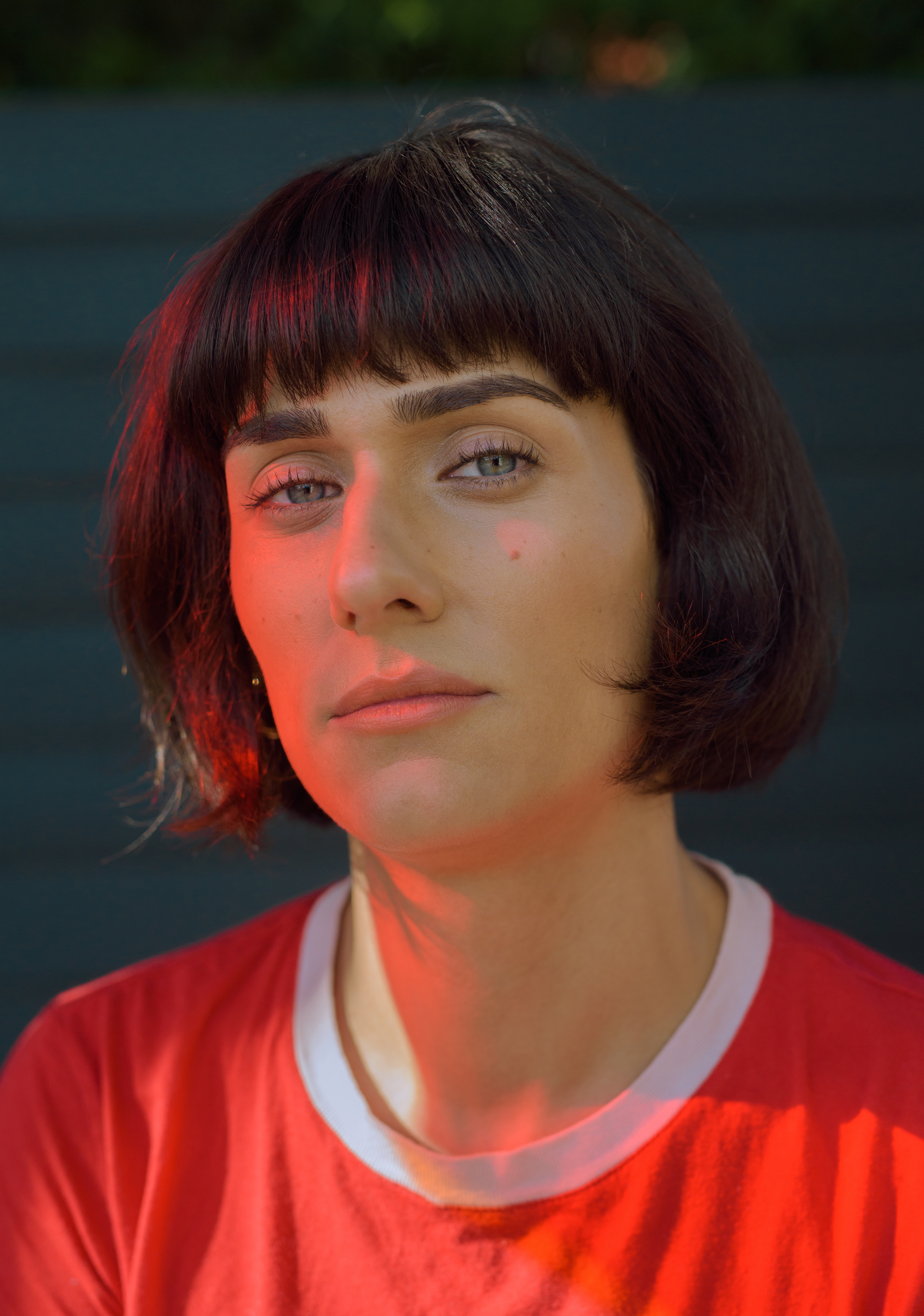

Background information
- Also known as: Teddy <3
- Born: September 16, 1988 (age 38); Rochester, New York, U.S.
- Genres: Alternative rock; pop rock
- Occupations: Singer-songwriter; record producer
- Instruments: Vocals, keyboards, guitar
- Years active: 2005–present
- Labels: Jabbarock; Whatever; Columbia; Sony BMG
- Website: teddyxo.com

Teddy Geiger (born September 16, 1988) is an American singer-songwriter and record producer who first gained teen idol status with the song "For You I Will (Confidence)" in 2006. Geiger acted in the television series Love Monkey (2006) and the film The Rocker (2008).

Geiger co-wrote a series of hit songs for Shawn Mendes, starting with the single "Stitches" in 2015, now certified 8× Platinum, and including the 7× Platinum "Treat You Better" in 2016. After transitioning in 2017–2018, Geiger released her third solo album, and continues to compose songs for other artists.

== Early life ==
Geiger was born on September 16, 1988, to John Geiger and Lorilyn Geiger (née Rizzo). She has two younger siblings. Geiger attended the boys school McQuaid Jesuit High School, and learned how to play piano and guitar. As a child, Geiger composed songs in the basement of the family home; writing on the guitar from the age of eight to entertain schoolmates.

== Career ==
=== 2004–2008: Teen idol ===
In July 2004 at the age of 15, Geiger tried out in a singing competition in Los Angeles for a planned VH1 television series reboot of The Partridge Family, the process of which was filmed and aired as its own program: In Search of the Partridge Family. During weeks of rehearsal, Geiger met the unknown teenager Emma Stone who won a spot as Laurie Partridge while Geiger was passed over for the role of Keith which had been played in the 1970s by David Cassidy. The show, The New Partridge Family, never aired, but the experience gave Geiger's career a significant boost: veteran producer Billy Mann saw the potential in Geiger and signed on as artist manager.

Also in 2004, Geiger formed the band Faction which played around New York state. The band won a competition in early 2005, and Geiger gave away the $1000 prize as relief for the survivors of the 2004 Indian Ocean earthquake and tsunami. Mann encouraged Geiger to sign a six-album recording contract with Columbia Records in February 2005, which broke up Faction as a band. As a solo artist, Geiger released the EP Step Ladder in June 2005. Geiger opened for Hilary Duff's Still Most Wanted Tour from July to September 2005, playing 35 dates across the US in front of thousands. Geiger continued touring as a solo artist, with a voice described as "raspy" like James Taylor, or "breathy" like John Mayer.

Geiger appeared as a recurring character in the short-lived television series Love Monkey, which also featured some of her music. The show debuted in January 2006, but was soon canceled. Geiger's song "For You I Will (Confidence)" was used as Love Monkey's theme music for four episodes, and it was released as the first single of Geiger's upcoming album. A music video was shot for the song, depicting Geiger as a street busker trying to attract a popular girl (played by reality TV actress Kristin Cavallari.) The song entered the Billboard Hot 100 at number 90 in February, rising to a peak of 29 in May, staying on the chart for 20 weeks. It was certified Gold in March 2006 by the RIAA, and nominated for Best Love Song at the 2006 Teen Choice Awards in August.

Geiger's first full-length album, Underage Thinking, was released on March 31, 2006, peaking at number 8 on the Billboard 200 albums chart. The first single, "For You I Will (Confidence)", preceded the album, and the second single, "These Walls," was released in September. AllMusic's Stephen Thomas Erlewine said that the album contained "unabashedly mainstream music, not cool in the slightest", but certainly the equal of "the best adult pop". Erlewine suggested that Geiger would have enjoyed greater uplift in album sales if Love Monkey had not been canceled shortly before the album was released.

Geiger was marketed as a teen idol, aimed at teenage girls who made up the largest demographic of fans. Geiger's most loyal fans called themselves "Tedheads" or "Ted-Heads". Geiger was photographed for a Got Milk? advertisement which was published in Rolling Stone magazine, with Gieger wearing a "milk mustache" alongside "number 1 fan" Rebecca Eden who won a 2005 photo competition for the privilege. In 2006, Geiger appeared in ads for Secret deodorant, with Procter & Gamble expressing hope that this would expand sales to teen girls. At the age of 18, Geiger was featured on the November 2006 cover of Seventeen magazine; Adweek remarked that it was unusual for a "boy" to appear on the cover after years of women being featured. The Morning Call commented that Geiger's cover feature confirmed that this was Seventeen deciding who was the "hottest guy" in the US, following past appearances by teen idols Leonardo DiCaprio in 1998 and Justin Timberlake in 2002.

In mid-2007, Geiger participated in the filming of The Rocker, portraying the role of a young musician writing songs in a band. Emma Stone was also in this production; the two struck up a romance which lasted for two years. The film was a box-office bomb, but Geiger's music was featured in the film along with a cover of the Poison song "Nothin' But a Good Time" with Geiger singing lead.

Geiger launched a solo tour in June–July 2008 called TG334U North American Concert Tour, with Hilary McRae as the opening act. The tour hit 33 concert venues. The "TG334U" moniker was an initialism standing for Teddy Geiger [performing] 33 [songs] for you. Geiger fans were asked to vote for their favorite songs which would be assembled to create the next solo album. The album project was not realized.

=== 2009–2017: Songwriter ===
In 2009, Columbia released Geiger from her contract and she left the music industry to return home to Rochester for a hiatus. She continued writing songs for other artists.

Geiger's second album, The Last Fears, was released in 2013 through iTunes and Spotify. The album involved many peers and collaborators including John Ryan, A Great Big World, Holly Miranda, Theo Katzman, as well as Levon Helm's producer and musical director Larry Campbell.

Geiger began a series of songwriting collaborations for Shawn Mendes, co-writing "Stitches" with Danny Parker in 2014. Mendes joined Geiger and Scott Harris to write "Treat You Better" in 2016. These were followed by "There's Nothing Holdin' Me Back" in 2017, and the 2018 hits "Lost in Japan", "In My Blood", "Youth" and "Where Were You in the Morning?" Some of the additional popular artists Geiger has written songs for include One Direction, Pink, Maroon 5, and Niall Horan.

=== 2018–present: Producer and musician ===
After transitioning in 2017–2018, Geiger released her third album, LillyAnna under the name Teddy <3 or teddy❤️, in 2018. The album received notice from New York Times, Paper, Billboard, and Rolling Stone.

== Personal life ==
Geiger came out as a trans woman in October 2017, saying that she remembered "feeling like a girl and wanting that" at the age of five. She has also said that she intends to keep the name Teddy and use female pronouns.

She was engaged to Canadian actress Emily Hampshire, but they ended their engagement in June 2019 after seven months.

Geiger stated in a 2021 interview that she is bisexual.

== Discography ==
=== Albums ===
List of studio albums, with selected information
Title	Details	Peak chart positions		
Title	Details	US	AUS	CAN
Underage Thinking	Released: March 21, 2006; Label: Columbia	8	27	30
The Last Fears	Released: May 14, 2013; Label: Jabbarock	—	—	—
Lillyanna	Released: November 9, 2018; Label: Whatever	—	—	—
"—" denotes releases that did not chart

=== Singles ===
==== As lead artist ====
Title	Year	Peak chart positions				Certifications	Album
Title	Year	US	US Adult Pop	US Pop	AUS	Certifications	Album
"For You I Will (Confidence)"	2005	29	10	18	12	RIAA: Gold	Underage Thinking
"These Walls"	2006	—	32	34	50		Underage Thinking
"Better Now" (Live from Harro East Ballroom)	2007	—	—	—	—		Non-album single
"I Was in a Cult"	2018	—	—	—	—		LillyAnna
"Lilyanna"	2018	—	—	—	—		LillyAnna
"Body and Soul"	2018	—	—	—	—		LillyAnna
"Sharkbait"	2020	—	—	—	—		Sharkbait
"Love Somebody"	2021	—	—	—	—		Spotify Singles
"Brass in Pocket"	2021	—	—	—	—		Spotify Singles
"Numb" (Teddy <3 Version)	2021	—	—	—	—		Numb
"Scream Drive Faster" (Teddy Geiger Remix)	2021	—	—	—	—		Non-album single
"—" denotes releases that did not chart

==== As featured artist ====
Year	Title	Album
2013	"Love and Run" (Tiësto, Mark Alston, Baggi Begovic and Jason Taylor featuring Teddy Geiger)	Club Life: Volume Three Stockholm

==== Promotional singles ====
Year	Title	Album
2018	"Under Pressure" (Shawn Mendes featuring Teddy<3)	Non-album promotional single

=== Other appearances ===
Compilations
Title	Year	Album
"You'll Be in My Heart"	2006	Disneymania 4
"Tomorrow Never Comes"	2008	The Rocker: Music from the Motion Picture
"Bitter"	2008	The Rocker: Music from the Motion Picture
"Living for the First Time"	2008	The Rocker: Music from the Motion Picture
"Down"	2008	The Rocker: Music from the Motion Picture
"Great Escape"	2008	The Rocker: Music from the Motion Picture
"Coming Through In Stereo"	2008	The Rocker: Music from the Motion Picture
"Nothin' But a Good Time"	2008	The Rocker: Music from the Motion Picture
"Too Far"	2008	The Rocker: Music from the Motion Picture
"I'm So Bitter"	2008	The Rocker: Music from the Motion Picture
"Afraid (My Brother's Cries)"	2009	SingSOS: Songs of the Spectrum

== Songwriting and production credits ==
Title	Year	Artist(s)	Album	Songwriter	Producer
"You're Not Thinking"	2011	Drake Bell	A Reminder EP	check	
"Love and Run" (with Mark Alston, Baggi Begovic, and Jason Taylor, featuring Teddy Geiger)	2013	Tiesto	Club Life: Volume Three Stockholm	check	
"Little Black Dress"	2013	One Direction	Midnight Memories	check	check
"Where Do Broken Hearts Go"	2014	One Direction	Four	check	check
"Stitches"	2015	Shawn Mendes	Handwritten	check	check
"Real Thing"	2015	LunchMoney Lewis	Bills EP	check	
"Emergency"	2015	Icona Pop	Emergency EP	check	
"First Time"	2015	Icona Pop	Emergency EP	check	
"Clap Snap"	2015	Icona Pop	Emergency EP	check	
"I Feel Good" (featuring LunchMoney Lewis)	2015	Thomas Rhett	Tangled Up	check	
"Wonderful Life (Mi Oh My)"	2015	Matoma	Hakuna Matoma	check	
"Work It Out" (featuring Digital Farm Animals)	2016	Netsky	III	check	check
"Save Yourself"	2016	Birdy	Beautiful Lies	check	
"New Girl"	2016	Reggie 'n' Bollie	Uncommon Favours	check	
"Treat You Better"	2016	Shawn Mendes	Illuminate	check	check
"Summer Nights" (featuring John Legend)	2016	Tiësto	Non-album single	check	
"Girls Talk Boys"	2016	5 Seconds of Summer	Ghostbusters: OST	check	
"Sober" (featuring JRY)	2016	DJ Snake	Encore	check	check
"Mercy'	2016	Shawn Mendes	Illuminate	check	check
"No Promises"	2016	Shawn Mendes	Illuminate	check	check
"Patience"	2016	Shawn Mendes	Illuminate	check	
"Digital Life"	2016	Empire of the Sun	Two Vines	check	
"Express Myself"	2016	Ricky Reed	Non-album single	check	check
"Be the 1"	2017	Ricky Reed	Non-album single	check	
"There's Nothing Holdin' Me Back"	2017	Shawn Mendes	Illuminate	check	
"Pray" (featuring Rooty)	2017	John Ryan	Fifty Shades Darker: OST	check	
"I Don't Wanna Dance"	2017	Coin	How Will You Know If You Never Try	check	
"Bartender"	2017	James Blunt	The Afterlove	check	check
"Over"	2017	James Blunt	The Afterlove	check	check
"O.D.D."	2017	Hey Violet	From the Outside	check	check
"All We Ever Wanted"	2017	Hey Violet	From the Outside	check	
"Do You Think of Me"	2017	NVDES	La Nvdite Vol. I EP	check	
"Capital Letters"	2017	Grace Mitchell	21st & Motley EP	check	
"Who I Am" (featuring LunchMoney Lewis)	2017	Maroon 5	Red Pill Blues	check	
"Dance"	2018	DNCE	Non-album single	check	
"Lost in Japan"	2018	Shawn Mendes	Shawn Mendes	check	check
"In My Blood"	2018	Shawn Mendes	Shawn Mendes	check	check
"Fitness"	2018	Lizzo	Non-album single	check	
"Machine"	2018	Anne-Marie	Speak Your Mind	check	check
"Youth" (featuring Khalid)	2018	Shawn Mendes	Shawn Mendes	check	
"If It Feels Good (Then It Must Be)"	2018	Leon Bridges	Good Thing	check	
"Spaceship" (featuring Uffie)	2018	Galantis	Non-album single	check	
"Where Were You in the Morning?"	2018	Shawn Mendes	Shawn Mendes	check	check
"Nervous"	2018	Shawn Mendes	Shawn Mendes		check
"Fallin' All in You"	2018	Shawn Mendes	Shawn Mendes	check	check
"Why"	2018	Shawn Mendes	Shawn Mendes	check	check
"Because I Had You"	2018	Shawn Mendes	Shawn Mendes	check	check
"Queen"	2018	Shawn Mendes	Shawn Mendes	check	check
"Mutual"	2018	Shawn Mendes	Shawn Mendes	check	check
"When You're Ready"	2018	Shawn Mendes	Shawn Mendes		check
"Perfectly Wrong"	2018	Shawn Mendes	Shawn Mendes	check	check
"Unless It's With You"	2018	Christina Aguilera	Liberation	check	
"Woke Up in Japan"	2018	5 Seconds of Summer	Youngblood	check	
"Jump on It"	2018	Sean Paul	Mad Love: The Prequel EP	check	check
"Low Key"	2019	Ally Brooke	TBA	check	
"We Lied To Each Other"	2019	Olivia O'Brien	Was It Even Real?	check	check
"Call Me"	2019	Olivia O'Brien	Was It Even Real?	check	
"So Hot You're Hurting My Feelings"	2019	Caroline Polachek	Pang	check	
"Black and White"	2020	Niall Horan	Heartbreak Weather	check	
"Dear Patience"	2020	Niall Horan	Heartbreak Weather	check	
"Cross Your Mind"	2020	Niall Horan	Heartbreak Weather	check	
"San Francisco"	2020	Niall Horan	Heartbreak Weather		check
"Whatever It Is"	2020	Loyal Lobos	Everlasting		check
"Criminals"	2020	Loyal Lobos	Everlasting		check
"Bad To Myself"	2020	Greyson Chance	Bad To Myself	check	check
"Sleep at Night"	2020	The Chicks	Gaslighter	check	check
"Focused"	2020	John Legend	Bigger Love	check	
"Overloved"	2021	Greyson Chance	Overloved	check	check
"Scream Drive Faster Teddy Geiger Remix"	2021	Laurel	Scream Drive Faster (Teddy Geiger Remix)	check	check
"Teenage Boys"	2021	Julianna Joy	Garden of Eden	check	check
"Hold on to Me"	2021	JP Saxe	Dangerous Levels of Introspection	check	check
"Blondes"	2021	Blu DeTiger	Blondes	check	check
"Colors"	2021	Dillon Francis, Liza Owen	Happy Machine	check	
"Numb Teddy <3 Version"	2021	Sylvan Esso	Numb	check	check
"Holy Feeling"	2021	Greyson Chance	Trophies	check	check
"Old Her"	2022	YDE	Old Her	check	check
"Normal to Feel"	2022	YDE	Normal to Feel	check	check
"Rainbow"	2022	Meghan Trainor	Takin' It Back		check
"Where Do All The Diamonds Go?"	2023	Cyn		check	check
"Feel Something"	2023	P!nk	Trustfall	check	check

== Television and movie appearances ==
Year	Title	Role	Notes
2004	VH1's In Search of the Partridge Family	Keith Partridge	Finalist
2006	Love Monkey	Wayne Jensen	4 episodes (Pilot, "Nice Package", "Coming Out", "Confidence")
2008	The Rocker	Curtis	Film
2012	Royal Pains	Lucky	2 episodes ("Off-Season Greetings", Parts 1 and 2)
