= Youth (Shawn Mendes song) =

Single by Shawn Mendes featuring Khalid

from the album Shawn Mendes
- Released: May 3, 2018
- Genre: Pop; R&B
- Length: 3:09
- Label: Island
- Songwriters: Shawn Mendes; Khalid Robinson; Nolan Lambroza; Teddy Geiger; Geoff Warburton; Scott Harris
- Producers: Joel Little; Shawn Mendes

Shawn Mendes singles chronology
"Lost in Japan" (2018)	"Youth" (2018)	"Where Were You in the Morning?" (2018)

Khalid singles chronology
"OTW" (2018)	"Youth" (2018)	"This Way" (2018)

Music video
- "Youth" on YouTube

"Youth" is a song by Canadian singer Shawn Mendes, featuring American singer Khalid. It was written by Khalid, Teddy Geiger, Geoff Warburton, Scott Harris, and Mendes, who produced it with Joel Little. The song was released by Island Records on May 3, 2018, as the third single from Mendes' self-titled third studio album.

== Background and release ==
The song was first revealed when Mendes unveiled the album's track listing. On May 1, 2018, Mendes announced the single release on Twitter with a graphic of the lyric "you can't take my youth away". Khalid retweeted Mendes and added a corresponding lyric with hearts: "Pain, but I won't let it turn into hate". The lyrics were also posted on billboards across New York, Los Angeles, Chicago, Miami, Washington, D.C., Toronto, London, Berlin, Stockholm, Rio, and Melbourne.

The song premiered on Zane Lowe's Beats 1 radio show, where Mendes talked about collaborating with Khalid. Mendes said that the song was inspired by the Manchester Arena bombing in May 2017. He texted Khalid: "When we get together, we have to make a statement, we have to move, we have to write about what's going on in life and how the youth is feeling", saying that they "have the voice to do that".

They got into the studio in the aftermath of the attacks. Mendes shared that, "You're always terrified going into a session knowing like, 'Okay, this is going to be a big session. I have one day. Is it gonna be a great song or not?' I remember I woke up in the morning and the whole thought of my youth trying to be taken away from me [was overwhelming]. Not youth as in my age—youth as in my love, my happiness, my joy, my purity. It's not even about age; you could be 50 and your youth is there, it's in you. And all of these horrible things happening in the world, all of the headlines, it felt like everyday it would just be pulled more and more out of us, and I was like, 'This is what I have to write about.'"

An acoustic version of the duet was released on May 24, 2018.

On December 21, 2018, a remix of the duet was released featuring Jessie Reyez.

== Composition ==
"Youth" is a midtempo pop and R&B vocal duet about retaining youth in the wake of adversity. It opens with a slow beat, before a bassline kicks in and it escalates into a singalong chorus, which features "a steady beat and Latin-tinged acoustic guitar riffs". The song contains references to the current social and political climate.

== Critical reception ==
Sam Prance of MTV News regarded the song as "one of the most uplifting and life-affirming songs of the year so far", writing that "Shawn and Khalid compliment [sic] each other on it perfectly". Patrick Hosken of the same publication opined that Khalid's "gravelly voice pairs nicely with Mendes's own patented rasp", stating that "the message of the song is simple but effective". Mike Nied of Idolator deemed it "one of the 19-year-old's most ambitious tracks yet".

== Music video ==
The song's official music video premiered on Apple Music and VEVO on 5 November 2018, and it was directed by Anthony Mandler.

== Live performances ==
Mendes and Khalid performed "Youth" at the 2018 Billboard Music Awards on May 20, 2018, as a tribute to the victims of gun violence. The performance featured the show choir from Marjory Stoneman Douglas High School. Mendes performed the song with John Legend at the Global Citizen Festival in New York City on September 29, 2018.

== Track listing ==
- Digital download
1. "Youth" (featuring Khalid) – 3:09
- Digital download – acoustic
1. "Youth" (featuring Khalid) (acoustic) – 3:09

== Credits and personnel ==
Credits adapted from Tidal.

- Shawn Mendes – vocals, songwriting, production
- Khalid – vocals, songwriting
- Sir Nolan – songwriting
- Scott Harris – songwriting
- Teddy Geiger – songwriting
- Geoff Warburton – songwriting
- Joel Little – production, engineering, keyboard, acoustic guitar, percussion, programming
- Harry Burr – mixing assistance
- Andrew Maury – mixing

== Charts ==
=== Weekly charts ===
Chart (2018)	Peak position
Australia (ARIA)	19
Austria (Ö3 Austria Top 40)	18
Belgium (Ultratip Bubbling Under Flanders)	4
Canada Hot 100 (Billboard)	22
Czech Republic Singles Digital (ČNS IFPI)	13
Denmark (Tracklisten)	14
France (SNEP)	82
Germany (GfK)	43
Hungary (Single Top 40)	15
Hungary (Stream Top 40)	4
Ireland (IRMA)	29
Italy (FIMI)	57
Malaysia (RIM)	18
Netherlands (Single Top 100)	24
New Zealand (Recorded Music NZ)	22
Norway (VG-lista)	18
Portugal (AFP)	10
Scotland Singles (Official Charts)	35
Slovakia Airplay (ČNS IFPI)	64
Slovakia Singles Digital (ČNS IFPI)	11
Spain (PROMUSICAE)	79
Sweden (Sverigetopplistan)	23
Switzerland (Schweizer Hitparade)	19
UK Singles (Official Charts)	35
US Billboard Hot 100	65

=== Year-end charts ===
Chart (2018)	Position
Portugal (AFP)	118

== Certifications ==
Certifications for "Youth"
Region	Certification	Certified units/sales
Australia (ARIA)	2× Platinum	140,000^{‡}
Brazil (Pro-Música Brasil)	2× Platinum	80,000^{‡}
Canada (Music Canada)	Platinum	80,000^{‡}
Denmark (IFPI Danmark)	Gold	45,000^{‡}
Mexico (AMPROFON)	Gold	30,000^{‡}
New Zealand (RMNZ)	Platinum	30,000^{‡}
Norway (IFPI Norway)	Gold	30,000^{‡}
Poland (ZPAV)	Platinum	20,000^{‡}
Portugal (AFP)	Platinum	10,000^{‡}
United Kingdom (BPI)	Silver	200,000^{‡}
United States (RIAA)	Platinum	1,000,000^{‡}
^{‡} Sales+streaming figures based on certification alone.

== Release history ==
Region	Date	Format	Version	Label	Ref.
Various	May 3, 2018	Digital download; streaming	Original	Island	
Various	May 24, 2018	Digital download; streaming	Acoustic	Island	

== External music ==
- Lyric video on YouTube
