= List of Shawn Mendes live performances =

Shawn Mendes live performances
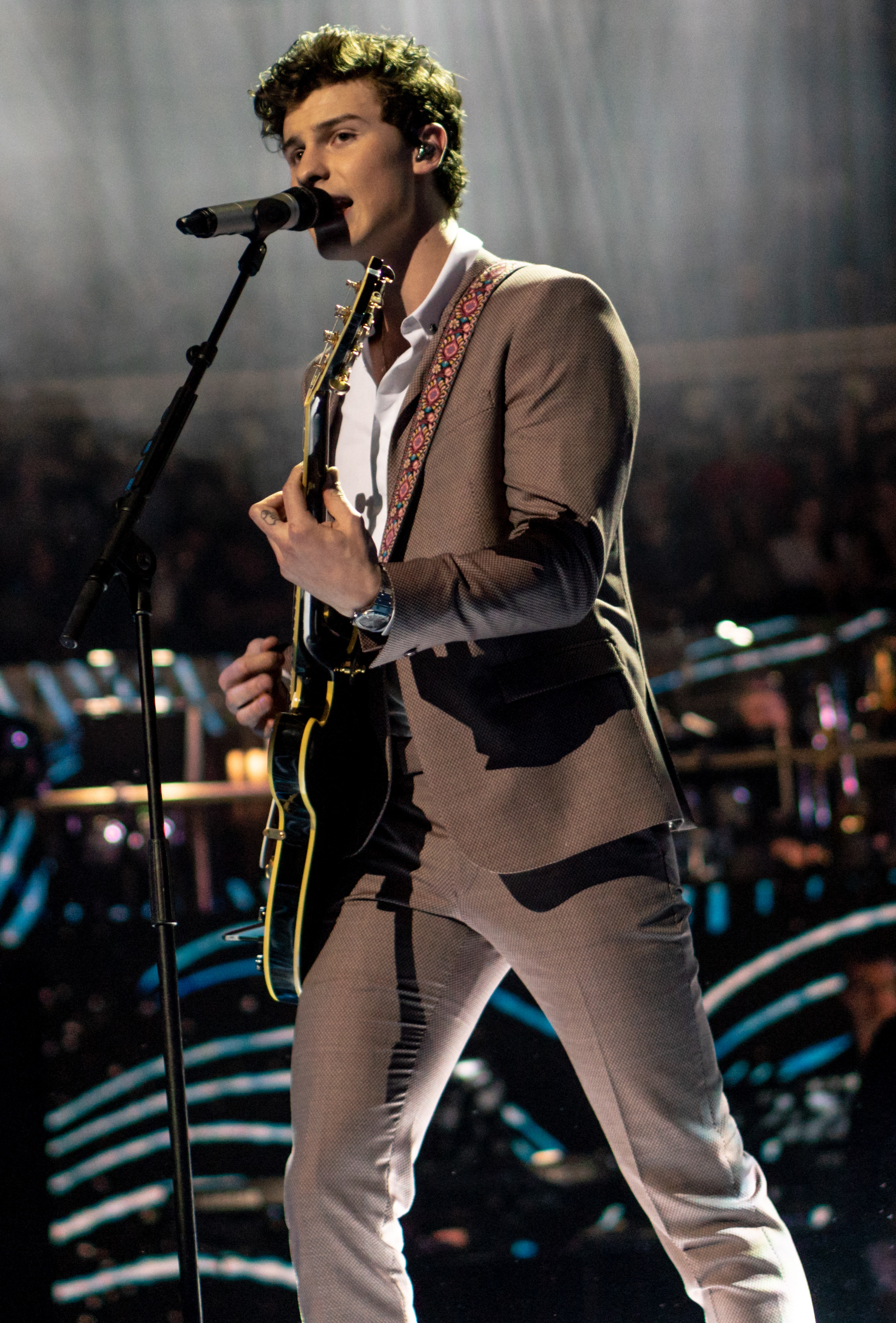
- Mendes performing at Queen Elizabeth II's 92nd birthday in March 2018.
- Concert tours: 4
- Live performances: 80

Canadian singer and songwriter Shawn Mendes has released three studio albums, an extended play and two live albums since his debut in 2013. This has resulted in four concert tours (all of them worldwide), and numerous TV and award shows performances. He first released an extended play named The Shawn Mendes EP in July 2014. The EP got promoted through 2014, through performances at several award ceremonies and television shows, including the Jingle Ball and The Ellen DeGeneres Show. Mendes has served as an opening act for Austin Mahone on the North American leg of his 2014 tour. He also has served as the opening act for Taylor Swift’s 1989 World Tour on selected dates of the tour's North American leg.

In 2014 he embarked on his debut concert tour, #ShawnsFirstHeadlines, which only visited North America and Europe and grossed over a million dollars. He embarked on his second world tour Shawn Mendes World Tour in 2016 to promote his first studio album Handwritten (2015). The tour visited North America, Europe, Oceania and the Philippines. After completion, the tour grossed over $3.8 million and over 95,000 people had gone to one of the tour's stops. The Madison Square Garden show in September 2016 was filmed for a live album that got released three months later.

Mendes' next tour was named Illuminate World Tour. It began in April 2017 and ended in December 2017 visiting North America, Europe, Asia, Oceania and Brazil. It was reported that the tour had grossed over $37 million becoming his highest-grossing tour to date. The tour supported the release of his second studio album, Illuminate which was released in September 2016. The only show in Mexico was cancelled due to the 2017 Central Mexico earthquake. In November 2017, Mendes released his MTV Unplugged live album which was filmed at the Ace Hotel in Los Angeles in early September.

In May 2018 Mendes announced his fourth world tour called Shawn Mendes: The Tour. The tour will start in Amsterdam in March 2019 and will visit Europe, North America and Oceania. Before going on that 2019 tour, he had embarked on a big festival tour in 2018 to support his self-titled album which was released in May 2018.

== Concert tours ==
Title	Dates	Associated album(s)	Region(s)	Shows	Gross	Attendance	Ref.
#ShawnsFirstHeadlines	November 15, 2014 – September 18, 2015	The Shawn Mendes EP Handwritten	North America Europe	51	+$1,000,000	+60,000	
#ShawnsFirstHeadlines setlist: 1. "Something Big"; 2. "Show You"; 3. "Strings"; 4. "I Don't Even Know Your Name"; 5. "Stitches"; 6. "Fallin'" (Alicia Keys cover); 7. "Aftertaste"; 8. "Never Be Alone"; 9. "Hey There Delilah" (Plain White T's cover); 10. "Bring It Back"; 11. "Thinking Out Loud" (Ed Sheeran cover); 12. "A Little Too Much"; 13. "Kid in Love"; 14. "The Weight"; 15. "Life of the Party"
Shawn Mendes World Tour	March 5, 2016 – March 18, 2017	Handwritten	North America Europe Oceania Philippines	45	$3,800,000	95,461	
Shawn Mendes World Tour setlist: 1. "Something Big"; 2. "Life of the Party"; 3. "The Weight"; 4. "Aftertaste"; 5. "A Little Too Much"; 6. "Bring It Back"; 7. "I Don't Even Know Your Name"; 8. "Kid in Love"; 9. "I Know What You Did Last Summer"; 10. "Ruin"; 11. "Like This"; 12. "Act Like You Love Me"; 13. "Three Empty Words"; 14. "Never Be Alone"; 15. "Stitches"
Illuminate World Tour	April 27, 2017 – December 18, 2017	Illuminate	Europe North America Brazil Oceania Asia	60	$37,800,000	648,742	
Illuminate World Tour setlist: 1. "There's Nothing Holdin' Me Back"; 2. "Lights On"; 3. "I Don't Even Know Your Name" / "Aftertaste" / "Kid in Love" / "I Want You Back" (The Jackson 5 cover); 4. "The Weight"; 5. "A Little Too Much"; 6. "Stitches"; 7. "Bad Reputation"; 8. "Ruin"; 9. "Castle on the Hill" (Ed Sheeran cover) / "Life of the Party"; 10. "Three Empty Words"; 11. "Patience"; 12. "Roses"; 13. "No Promises"; 14. "Understand"; 15. "Don't Be a Fool"; 16. "Mercy"; 17. "Never Be Alone"; 18. "Treat You Better"
Shawn Mendes: The Tour	March 7, 2019 – December 21, 2019	Shawn Mendes	Europe North America Asia Oceania Latin America	104	TBA	TBA	
Shawn Mendes: The Tour setlist: 1. Lost in Japan; 2. There's Nothing Holdin' Me Back; 3. Nervous; 4. Stitches; 5. Señorita; 6. I Know What You Did Last Summer / Mutual; 7. Bad Reputation; 8. Never Be Alone; 9. I Wanna Dance With Somebody (Who Loves Me)(Whitney Houston cover); 10. A Little Too Much / Because I Had You; 11. Patience; 12. When You're Ready; 13. Life of the Party; 14. Like to Be You; 15. Ruin; 16. Treat You Better; 17. Particular Taste; 18. Where Were You in the Morning?; 19. Fallin' All in You; 20. Youth; 21. If I Can't Have You; 22. Why; 23. Mercy; 24. Fix You (Coldplay cover); 25. In My Blood

== Festival tours ==
Title	Dates	Associated album(s)	Continent(s)	Shows	Gross	Attendance	Ref.
Shawn Mendes Festival Tour 2018	June 1, 2018 – October 14, 2018	Shawn Mendes	North America South America Europe Asia	15	TBA	TBA	
Festival Tour 2018 setlist

== Live performances ==
=== Handwritten era ===
Date	Event	City	Performed song(s)
September 18, 2014	The Ellen DeGeneres Show	Burbank	"Life of the Party"
October 19, 2014	BBC Radio 1's Teen Awards 2014	London	"Oh Cecilia (Breaking My Heart)" (with The Vamps)
October 22, 2014	We Day	Vancouver	"Life of the Party" · "The Weight" · "Something Big"
December 5, 2014	KIIS FM's Jingle Ball	Los Angeles	"Show You" · "Something Big" · "The Weight" · "Life of the Party"
December 8, 2014	KDWB's Jingle Ball	Saint Paul	"Show You" · "Something Big" · "The Weight" · "Life of the Party"
December 10, 2014	Q102's Jingle Ball	Philadelphia	"Something Big" · "The Weight" · "Life of the Party"
December 12, 2014	Z100 Jingle Ball	New York City	"Something Big" · "Life of the Party"
December 14, 2014	Kiss 108's Jingle Ball	Boston	"The Weight" · "Life of the Party"
December 15, 2014	Hot 99.5 Jingle Ball	Washington, D.C.	"The Weight" · "Life of the Party"
December 18, 2014	103.5 KISS FM's Jingle Ball	Rosemont	"Something Big" · "Life of the Party"
December 21, 2014	Y100 Jingle Ball	Sunrise	"The Weight" · "Life of the Party"
December 22, 2014	93.3 FLZ Jingle Ball	Tampa	"Something Big" · "The Weight" · "Show You" · "Life of the Party"
December 31, 2014	New Year's Eve at Niagara Falls	Niagara Falls	"Show You" · "Something Big" · "Lean on Me" · "Life of the Party"
February 5, 2015	MTV's Artist to Watch 2015	Los Angeles	"Show You" · "Something Big" · "Lose Yourself" · "The Weight" · "Aftertaste" · "Life of the Party"
April 25, 2015	Radio Disney Music Awards 2015	Los Angeles	"Something Big"
April 28, 2015	The Ellen DeGeneres Show	Burbank	"Stitches"
April 29, 2015	Conan	Burbank	"Stitches"
May 22, 2015	Bayou Country Superfest 2015	Baton Rouge	"Something Big" · "Life of the Party" · "Kid in Love" · "Never be Alone" · "Fallin'" · "Hey There Delilah" · "Stitches"
June 21, 2015	2015 MuchMusic Video Awards	Toronto	"Stitches"
June 28, 2015	2015 Show of the Summer	Hershey	"Something Big" · "Never be Alone" · "Hey There Delilah" · "Stitches" · "Thinking Out Loud" · "Life of the Party"
July 9, 2015	Six Flags Summer Concert Series	Jackson	"Something Big" · "Strings" · "Never be Alone" · "Aftertaste" · "Stitches" · "The Weight" · "Fallin" · "A Little Too Much" · "Thining Out Loud" · "Life of the Party"
August 2, 2015	Queen City Ex	Regina	"Something Big" · "A Little To Much" · "Can't Feel My Face" (with Francesco Yates) · "Stitches" · "Life of the Party"
September 8, 2015	Island Life 2015	New York City	"Something Big" · "String" · "Thinking Out Loud" · "Stitches"
September 19, 2015	iHeartRadio Music Festival 2015	Las Vegas	"Something Big" · "Life of the Party" · "I Don't Even Know Your Name" · "Act Like You Love Me" · "Stitches"
October 1, 2015	We Day	Ontario	"Stitches" · "Never be Alone"
October 6, 2015	Festival Pier at Penn's Landing	Philadelphia	"Something Big" · "Lose Yourself" · "I Don't Even Know Your Name" · "Life of the Party" · "Stitches" · "Thinking Out Loud" · "The Weight" · "Never Be Alone" · "Hey There Delilah"
November 20, 2015	Live with Kelly and Ryan	New York City	"I Know What You Did Last Summer" (with Camila Cabello)
November 22, 2015	2015 American Music Awards	Los Angeles	"Act Like You Love Me" · "Stitches"
November 23, 2015	The Late Late Show with James Corden	Los Angeles	"I Know What You Did Last Summer" (with Camila Cabello)
December 1, 2015	106.1 KISS FM's Jingle Ball	Dallas	"Life of the Party" · "I Don't Even Know Your Name" · "Stitches" · "I Know What You Did Last Summer"
December 3, 2015	Wild 94.9's Jingle Ball5	Oakland	"Something Big" · "Lose Yourself" · "Life of the Party" · "I Don't Even Know Your Name" · "Stitches" · "Never Be Alone" · "Hey There Delilah"
December 4, 2015	KIIS FM's Jingle Ball5	Los Angeles	"Something Big" · "Life of the Party" · "Stitches" · "I Know What You Did Last Summer"
December 7, 2015	KDWB's Jingle Ball5	Saint Paul	"Something Big" · "The Weight" · "I Know What You Did Last Summer" · "Stitches" · "Life of the Party"
December 9, 2015	Q102's Jingle Ball15	Philadelphia	"Something Big" · "Lose Yourself" · "Life of the Party" · "The Weight" · "Stitches" · "Never Be Alone" · "Hey There Delilah"
December 11, 2015	Z100 Jingle Ball	New York City	"Something Big" · "Stitches" · "Never be Alone" · "I Know What You Did Last Summer"
December 14, 2015	Hot 99.5 Jingle Ball5	Washington, D.C.	"Something Big" · "Stitches" · "Never be Alone" · "I Know What You Did Last Summer"
December 19, 2015	93.3 FLZ Jingle Ball5	Tampa	"Something Big" · "Stitches" · "Never be Alone" · "I Know What You Did Last Summer"
December 31, 2015	Pitbull's New Year's Revolution	Miami	"I Know What You Did Last Summer" (with Camila Cabello)
January 4, 2016	The Tonight Show Starring Jimmy Fallon	New York City	"I Know What You Did Last Summer" (with Camila Cabello)
January 6, 2016	42nd People's Choice Awards	Los Angeles	"Stitches" · "I Know What You Did Last Summer" (with Camila Cabello)
February 2, 2016	Live Lounge	London	"Stitches" · "Here"
February 3, 2016	The Jonathan Ross Show	London	"Stitches"
February 4, 2016	C à vous	Paris	"Stitches"
February 4, 2016	NRJ Radio Studios	Paris	"Stitches"
February 5, 2016	NRJ Music Tour Beauvais 2016	Beauvais	"Something Big" · "The Weight" · "Stitches"
February 15, 2016	The Ellen DeGeneres Show	Burbank	"I Know What You Did Last Summer" (with Camila Cabello)

=== Illuminate era ===
Date	Event	City	Performed song(s)
March 5, 2016	Radio City Music Hall	New York	"Something Big" "Life of the Party" "The Weight" "Aftertaste" "A Little Too Much" "Bring It Back" "I Don't Even Know Your Name" "Kid in Love" "I Know What You Did Last Summer" (with Camila Cabello) "Ruin" "Like This" "Act Like You Love Me" "Three Empty Words" "Never Be Alone" "Stitches"
March 6, 2016	Houston Rodeo & Livestock Show 2016	Houston	"Something Big" · "Life of the Party" · "The Weight" · "Aftertaste" · "A Little Too Much" · "Bring it Down" · "I Don't Even Know Your Name" · "Kid in Love" · "I Know What You Did Last Summer" · "Ruin" · "Like This" · "Act Like You Love Me" · "Three Empty Words" · "Never be Alone" · "Stitches"
April 9, 2016	The Voice UK	London	"Stitches"
May 22, 2016	Billboard Music Awards 2016	Las Vegas	"Stitches"
June 19, 2016	MuchMusic Video Awards 2016	Toronto	"Treat You Better"
July 8, 2016	The Today Show Summer Concert Series	New York City	"Ruin" · "Stitches" · "Treat You Better"
July 11, 2016	The Tonight Show Starring Jimmy Fallon	New York City	"Treat You Better"
September 16, 2016	Soundcheck Neue Musik 2016	Göttingen	"Something Big" · "The Weight" · "Treat You Better" · "Lights On" · "I Don't Even Know Your Name" · "Aftertaste" · "Kid in Love" · "I Want You Back" · "Ruin" · "Three Empty Words" · "Mercy" · "Never be Alone" · "Life of the Party" · "Stitches"
September 17, 2016	Live38 XXL 2016	Amsterdam	"Something Big" · "Treat You Better" · "Mercy" · "Stitches"
September 22, 2016	The Tonight Show Starring Jimmy Fallon	New York City	"Mercy"
September 23, 2016	The Today Show	New York City	"Treat You Better" · "Mercy"
September 26, 2016	The Ellen DeGeneres Show	Burbank	"Treat You Better"
September 27, 2016	Grammy Museum	Los Angeles	"Life of the Party" · "Stitches" · "Three Empty Words" · "Like This" · "Ruin" · "Don't Be a Fool" · "Treat You Better" · "Mercy"
September 28, 2016	The Late Late Show with James Corden	Los Angeles	"Mercy"
September 29, 2016	The Talk	Los Angeles	"Treat You Better"
October 22, 2016	The X Factor (UK)	London	"Mercy"
October 23, 2016	BBC Radio 1's Teen Awards 2016	London	"Treat You Better" · "Ruin" · "Mercy" · "Stitches"
October 24, 2016	Rays of Sunshine Concert 2016	London	"Treat You Better" · "Mercy" · "Stitches"
October 25, 2016	The Jonathan Ross Show	London	"Treat You Better"
October 26, 2016	Shawn Mendes Live at The Hippodrome	Kingston upon Thames	"Three Empty Words" · "Ruin" · "Treat You Better" · "Mercy" · "Stitches"
October 30, 2016	Shawn Mendes X iHeartRadio: Sydney's Trackdown Stage	Sydney	"Three Empty Words" · "Ruin" · "Treat You Better" · "Mercy" · "Stitches"
October 31, 2016	X Factor Australia	Sydney	"Mercy"
November 6, 2016	MTV Europe Music Awards 2016	Rotterdam	"Mercy"
November 7, 2016	RTL Late Night	Amsterdam	"Treat You Better" · "Mercy"
November 10, 2016	X Factor (Italy)	Milan	"Mercy"
November 20, 2016	American Music Awards 2016	Los Angeles	"Treat You Better" · "Mercy" · "Three Empty Words"
December 3, 2016	Saturday Night Live	New York City	"Mercy" · "Treat You Better"
December 4, 2016	Capital FM Jingle Bell Ball	London	"Mercy" · "Ruin" · "Stitches" · "Treat You Better"
December 6, 2016	Live Lounge	London	"Mercy" · "Fake Love"
December 7, 2016	Q102's Jingle Ball	Philadelphia	"Treat You Better" · "Ruin" · "Mercy" · "Patience" · "Stitches"
December 10, 2016	B96 Jingle Bash6	Rosemont	"Treat You Better" · "Mercy" · "Ruin" · "Three Empty Words" · "Stitches"
December 11, 2016	Kiss 108's Jingle Ball	Boston	"Treat You Better" · "Mercy" · "Ruin" · "Three Empty Words" · "Stitches"
March 5, 2017	iHeart Radio Music Awards 2017	Inglewood	"Mercy"
March 25, 2017	PopSpring Festival 2017	Chiba	
March 26, 2017	PopSpring Festival 2017	Kobe	
April 2, 2017	2017 Juno Awards	Ottawa	"Mercy"
May 28, 2017	Radio 1's Big Weekend 2017	Kingston upon Hull	"There's Nothing Holdin' Me Back" · "Lights On" · "Stitches" · "Ruin" · "Mercy" · "Treat You Better"
June 10, 2017	2017 Summertime Ball	London	"There's Nothing Holdin' Me Back" · "Stitches" · "Ruin" · "Mercy" · "Castle on the Hill" · "Treat You Better"
August 27, 2017	2017 MTV Video Music Awards	Los Angeles	"There's Nothing Holdin' Me Back"
September 16, 2017	Rock in Rio 2017	Rio de Janeiro	"There's Nothing Holdin' Me Back" · "Lights On" · "Stitches" · "Bad Reputation" · "Ruin" · "Castle on the Hill" · "Life of the Party" · "Don't Be a Fool" · "Understand" · "Mercy" · "Never be Alone" · "Use Somebody" · "Treat You Better"
November 12, 2017	MTV Europe Music Awards 2017	London	"There's Nothing Holdin' Me Back"
November 19, 2017	American Music Awards 2017	Los Angeles	"There's Nothing Holdin' Me Back"

=== Shawn Mendes era ===
Date	Event	City	Performed song(s)
March 28, 2018	The Late Late Show with James Corden	Los Angeles	"In My Blood"
April 12, 2018	ECHO Awards 2018	Berlin	"In My Blood"
April 19, 2018	Live Lounge	London	"In My Blood" · "Psycho"
April 20, 2018	Sounds Like Friday Night	London	"In My Blood" · "Lost in Japan"
April 21, 2018	Queen Elisabeth's 92nd Birthday	London	"In My Blood"
May 17, 2018	Apple Music: One Night Only	Los Angeles	"Lost in Japan" · "There's Nothing Holdin' Me Back" · "Youth" · "Thinkin' Bout You" · "Mercy" · "Where Were You in the Morning?" · "In My Blood"
May 18, 2018	Taylor Swift's Reputation Stadium Tour	Pasadena	"There's Nothing Holdin' Me Back"
May 20, 2018	2018 Billboard Music Awards	Las Vegas	"In My Blood" · "Youth"
May 24, 2018	Germany's Next Topmodel	Düsseldorf	"There's Nothing Holdin' Me Back" · "In My Blood"
May 27, 2018	Radio 1's Big Weekend 2018	Swansea	"There's Nothing Holdin' Me Back" · "Stitches" · "Nervous" · "Lost in Japan" · "Mercy" · "In My Blood" · "Use Somebody" · "Treat You Better"
June 1, 2018	Governors Ball 2018	Randalls Island	"There's Nothing Holdin' Me Back" · "Stitches" · "Ruin" · "Lost in Japan" · "Mercy" · "In My Blood" · "Use Somebody" · "Treat You Better"
June 1, 2018	The Today Show	New York City	"In My Blood" · "Nervous" · "There's Nothing Holdin' Me Back"
June 2, 2018	2018 Wango Tango	Los Angeles	"There's Nothing Holdin' Me Back" · "Stitches" · "Ruin" · "Lost in Japan" · "Mercy" · "In My Blood" · "Use Somebody" · "Treat You Better"
June 4, 2018	The Late Late Show: Carpool Karaoke	Los Angeles	"There's Nothing Holdin' Me Back" · "In My Blood" · "Mercy" · "Treat You Better" · "Lost in Japan"
June 5, 2018	The Late Late Show: Shawn Week	Los Angeles	"Lost in Japan"
June 6, 2018	The Late Late Show: Shawn Week	Los Angeles	"Like to Be You"
June 7, 2018	The Late Late Show: Shawn Week	Los Angeles	"Perfectly Wrong"
June 9, 2018	Summertime Ball 2018	London	"There's Nothing Holdin' Me Back" · "Stitches" · "Nervous" · "Lost in Japan" · "Ruin" · "Thinkin' Bout You" · "Mercy" · "In My Blood" · "Use Somebody" · "Treat You Better"
June 15, 2018	Summer Jam 2018	Wantagh, NY	"There's Nothing Holdin' Me Back" · "Stitches" · "Lost in Japan" · "In My Blood" · "Use Somebody" · "Treat You Better"
July 1, 2018	Villa Mix Festival 2018	Goiânia	"There's Nothing Holdin' Me Back" · "Stitches" · "Nervous" · "Lost in Japan" · "Bad Reputation" · "Ruin" · "Thinkin' Bout You" · "Youth" · "Mercy" · "Where Were You in the Morning?" · "Fallin' All in You" · "Never Be Alone" · "In My Blood" · "Use Somebody" · "Treat You Better"
July 5, 2018	Summerfest 2018	Milwaukee	"There's Nothing Holdin' Me Back" · "Stitches" · "Nervous" · "Lost in Japan" · "Bad Reputation" · "Ruin" · "Thinkin' Bout You" · "Youth" · "Mercy" · "Where Were You in the Morning?" · "Fallin' All in You" · "Never Be Alone" · "In My Blood" · "Use Somebody" · "Treat You Better"
July 7, 2018	RBC Royal Bank Bluesfest 2018	Ottawa	"There's Nothing Holdin' Me Back" · "Stitches" · "Nervous" · "Lost in Japan" · "Bad Reputation" · "Ruin" · "Thinkin' Bout You" · "Youth" · "Mercy" · "Where Were You in the Morning?" · "Fallin' All in You" · "Never Be Alone" · "In My Blood" · "Use Somebody" · "Treat You Better"
July 8, 2018	Festival d'été de Québec 2018	Quebec City	"There's Nothing Holdin' Me Back" · "Stitches" · "Nervous" · "Lost in Japan" · "Bad Reputation" · "Ruin" · "Thinkin' Bout You" · "Youth" · "Mercy" · "Where Were You in the Morning?" · "Fallin' All in You" · "Never Be Alone" · "In My Blood" · "Use Somebody" · "Treat You Better"
July 9, 2018	Cavendish Beach Music Festival	Cavendish	"There's Nothing Holdin' Me Back" · "Stitches" · "Nervous" · "Lost in Japan" · "Bad Reputation" · "Ruin" · "Thinkin' Bout You" · "Youth" · "Mercy" · "Where Were You in the Morning?" · "Fallin' All in You" · "Never Be Alone" · "In My Blood" · "Use Somebody" · "Treat You Better"
August 9, 2018	Smukfest 2018	Skanderborg	"There's Nothing Holdin' Me Back" · "Stitches" · "Nervous" · "Lost in Japan" · "Bad Reputation" · "Ruin" · "Thinkin' Bout You" · "Youth" · "Mercy" · "Where Were You in the Morning?" · "Fallin' All in You" · "Never Be Alone" · "In My Blood" · "Use Somebody" · "Treat You Better"
August 11, 2018	Festival do Sudoeste 2018	Zambujeira do Mar	"There's Nothing Holdin' Me Back" · "Stitches" · "Nervous" · "Lost in Japan" · "Bad Reputation" · "Ruin" · "Thinkin' Bout You" · "Youth" · "Mercy" · "Where Were You in the Morning?" · "Fallin' All in You" · "Never Be Alone" · "In My Blood" (Portuguese Version)· "Use Somebody" · "Treat You Better"
August 13, 2018	Sziget Festival 2018	Budapest	"There's Nothing Holdin' Me Back" · "Stitches" · "Nervous" · "Lost in Japan" · "Bad Reputation" · "Ruin" · "Thinkin' Bout You" · "Youth" · "Mercy" · "Where Were You in the Morning?" · "Fallin' All in You" · "Never Be Alone" · "In My Blood" · "Use Somebody" · "Treat You Better"
August 18, 2018	Summer Sonic Festival 2018	Tokyo	"There's Nothing Holdin' Me Back" · "Stitches" · "Nervous" · "Lost in Japan" · "Bad Reputation" · "Ruin" · "Thinkin' Bout You" · "Youth" · "Mercy" · "Where Were You in the Morning?" · "Fallin' All in You" · "Never Be Alone" · "In My Blood" · "Treat You Better"
August 19, 2018	Summer Sonic Festival 2018	Osaka	"There's Nothing Holdin' Me Back" · "Stitches" · "Nervous" · "Lost in Japan" · "Bad Reputation" · "Ruin" · "Thinkin' Bout You" · "Youth" · "Mercy" · "Where Were You in the Morning?" · "Fallin' All in You" · "Never Be Alone" · "In My Blood" · "Treat You Better"
August 20, 2018	2018 MTV Video Music Awards	New York City	"In My Blood"
August 26, 2018	MuchMusic Video Awards 2018	Toronto	"Lost in Japan" · "In My Blood"
September 1, 2018	Sundown Festival	Costessey	"There's Nothing Holdin' Me Back" · "Stitches" · "Nervous" · "Lost in Japan" · "Bad Reputation" · "Ruin" · "Thinkin' Bout You" · "Youth" · "Mercy" · "Where Were You in the Morning?" · "Fallin' All in You" · "Never Be Alone" · "In My Blood" · "Use Somebody" · "Treat You Better"
September 2, 2018	Fusion Festival	Liverpool	"There's Nothing Holdin' Me Back" · "Stitches" · "Nervous" · "Lost in Japan" · "Bad Reputation" · "Ruin" · "Thinkin' Bout You" · "Youth" · "Mercy" · "Where Were You in the Morning?" · "Fallin' All in You" · "Never Be Alone" · "In My Blood" · "Use Somebody" · "Treat You Better"
September 6, 2018	2018 NFL Kickoff Game Celebration	Philadelphia	TBA
September 22, 2018	iHeart Radio Music Festival 2018	Las Vegas	TBA
September 29, 2018	Global Citizen Festival	New York City	TBA
October 9, 2018	2018 American Music Awards	Los Angeles	"Lost in Japan"
October 13, 2018	El Paso University Festival	El Paso	TBA
October 14, 2018	Austin City Limits Festival	Austin	TBA
November 27, 2018	106.1 KISS FM Jingle Ball	Dallas	"There's Nothing Holding Me Back", "Lost in Japan", "Stitches", "In My Blood", "Use Somebody" / "Treat You Better" (medley)
December 2, 2018	Victoria's Secret Fashion Show 2018	New York	"Lost in Japan"
February 10, 2019	61st Grammy Awards	Los Angeles	"In My Blood" performed with Miley Cyrus
February 17, 2019	Elvis All-Star Tribute	Burbank	"Hound Dog"
May 4, 2019	Saturday Night Live	New York	"If I Can't Have You" · "In My Blood"
August 26, 2019	MTV Video Music Awards 2019	Newark	"If I Can't Have You" · "Señorita" (with Camila Cabello)
November 24, 2019	American Music Awards of 2019	Los Angeles	"Señorita" (with Camila Cabello)
April 18, 2020	One World: Together at Home	Los Angeles	"What a Wonderful World" (with Camila Cabello)
