= Shawn's First Headlines =

2014–15 concert tour by Shawn Mendes

- Tour by Shawn Mendes
- Promotional poster for the tour
- Location: North America • Europe
- Associated album: The Shawn Mendes EP; Handwritten
- Start date: November 15, 2014
- End date: September 18, 2015
- Legs: 6
- No. of shows: 51

Shawn Mendes concert chronology
- Shawn's First Headlines (2014–15); Shawn Mendes World Tour (2016)

Shawn's First Headlines (often stylized as #ShawnsFirstHeadlines) was the debut concert tour by Canadian recording artist, Shawn Mendes. The tour supports the singer's EP, The Shawn Mendes EP (2014), and his debut studio album, Handwritten (2015). The tour visited North America and Europe.

== Opening acts ==
- Jacquie Lee (North America, select dates)
- Scott Helman (Toronto)
- Astrid S (Stockholm—February 2015)
- Melanie Martinez (Atlanta Paramount Theatre June 10, 2015)

== Setlist ==
The following setlist was obtained from the concert held on June 9, 2015, at the Hampton Beach Casino Ballroom in Hampton Beach, New Hampshire. It does not represent all concerts for the duration of the tour.

1. "Something Big"
2. "Show You"
3. "Strings"
4. "I Don't Even Know Your Name"
5. "Stitches"
6. "Fallin'" (Alicia Keys cover)
7. "Aftertaste"
8. "Never Be Alone"
9. "Hey There Delilah" (Plain White T's cover)
10. "Bring It Back"
11. "Thinking Out Loud" (Ed Sheeran cover)
12. "A Little Too Much"
13. "Kid in Love"
14. "The Weight"
15. "Life of the Party"

== Tour dates ==
Date	City	Country	Venue
North America
November 15, 2014	New York City	United States	Best Buy Theater
November 22, 2014^{[A]}	Los Angeles	United States	Club Nokia
November 26, 2014	Los Angeles	United States	Wiltern Theatre
November 30, 2014	Toronto	Canada	Danforth Music Hall
December 5, 2014^{[B]}	Los Angeles	United States	Staples Center
December 8, 2014^{[B]}	Saint Paul	United States	Xcel Energy Center
December 10, 2014^{[B]}	Philadelphia	United States	Wells Fargo Center
December 12, 2014^{[B]}	New York City	United States	Madison Square Garden
December 14, 2014^{[B]}	Boston	United States	TD Garden
December 15, 2014^{[B]}	Washington, D.C.	United States	Verizon Center
December 18, 2014^{[B]}	Rosemont	United States	Allstate Arena
December 21, 2014^{[B]}	Sunrise	United States	BB&T Center
December 22, 2014^{[B]}	Tampa	United States	Amalie Arena
Europe
February 23, 2015	Stockholm	Sweden	Debaser
February 25, 2015	Berlin	Germany	Frannz-Club
March 1, 2015	Paris	France	La Boule Noire
March 4, 2015	London	England	The Garage
North America
April 8, 2015	Miami Beach	United States	The Fillmore Miami Beach
April 10, 2015	Atlanta	United States	Center Stage Theater
April 11, 2015	Nashville	United States	Ryman Auditorium
April 12, 2015	St. Louis	United States	The Pageant
April 14, 2015	Minneapolis	United States	Carlson Family Stage
April 15, 2015	Milwaukee	United States	Eagles Ballroom
April 17, 2015	Denver	United States	Ogden Theatre
April 19, 2015	Dallas	United States	McFarlin Memorial Auditorium
April 21, 2015	Scottsdale	United States	Livewire
April 22, 2015	Santa Ana	United States	The Observatory
April 24, 2015	San Francisco	United States	Warfield Theatre
May 23, 2015^{[C]}	Valdosta	United States	All-Star Amphitheater
May 24, 2015^{[D]}	Orlando	United States	Universal Music Plaza Stage
May 26, 2015	Charlotte	United States	Amo's Southend
May 27, 2015	Richmond	United States	National Theater
May 29, 2015	Clifton Park	United States	Upstate Concert Hall
May 31, 2015	Huber Heights	United States	Rose Music Center
June 7, 2015	Uncasville	United States	Mohegan Sun Arena
June 9, 2015	Hampton Beach	United States	Hampton Beach Casino Ballroom
June 10, 2015	Huntington	United States	Paramount Theatre
June 27, 2015	Darien	United States	Darien Lake Performing Arts Center
June 28, 2015^{[E]}	Hershey	United States	Hersheypark Stadium
July 9, 2015^{[F]}	Jackson	United States	Plymouth Rock Assurance Arena
July 16, 2015	Columbus	United States	Lifestyle Communities Pavilion
July 21, 2015	Cleveland	United States	Jacobs Pavilion
July 22, 2015	Indianapolis	United States	Farm Bureau Insurance Lawn
August 2, 2015^{[G]}	Regina	Canada	Molson Canadian Live Grandstand
August 4, 2015	Edmonton	Canada	Francis Winspear Centre
August 5, 2015	Calgary	Canada	Singer Concert Hall
August 7, 2015	Portland	United States	Crystal Ballroom
August 16, 2015	Los Angeles	United States	Greek Theatre
Europe
September 12, 2015	Madrid	Spain	Teatro Monumental
September 15, 2015	London	England	O_{2} Shepherd's Bush Empire
September 18, 2015	Stockholm	Sweden	Lilla Scen

Festivals and other miscellaneous performances
^{A} This concert was a part of "Radio Disney's Family Birthday"
^{B} This concert was a part of the "Jingle Ball"
^{C} This concert was a part of the "All-Star Concerts"
^{D} This concert was a part of the "25th Anniversary Concert Series"
^{E} This concert was a part of the "Show of the Summer"
^{F} This concert was a part of the "Six Flags Summer Concert Series"
^{G} This concert was a part of "Queen City Ex"

=== Box office score data ===
Venue	City	Tickets sold / Available	Gross revenue
Warfield Theatre	San Francisco	2,370 / 2,370 (100%)	$78,390
Amo's Southend	Charlotte	1,334 / 1,372 (97%)	$34,300
Mohegan Sun Arena	Uncasville	7,029 / 7,304 (96%)	$175,725
Paramount Theatre	Huntington	1,573 / 1,573 (100%)	$44,155
Lifestyle Communities Pavilion	Columbus	5,022 / 5,022 (100%)	$83,435
Francis Winspear Centre	Edmonton	1,631 / 1,631 (100%)	$47,283
Singer Concert Hall	Calgary	1,638 / 1,638 (100%)	$42,646
TOTAL		20,597 / 20,918 (98%)	$505,934
