= Aurora (Bea Miller album) =

Studio album by Bea Miller
- Released: February 23, 2018
- Length: 45:19
- Label: Hollywood
- Producers: Ido Zmishlany; Michel Heyaca; Oak; Trevorious; Zaire Koalo; Dreamlab; Jarrad Rogers; DJ Stanfill; Cole Citrenbaum; Imad Royal; Mike Sabath; Jesse Shatkin; Spencer Bastian; Jintae Ko

Bea Miller chronology
Chapter Three: Yellow (2017)	Aurora (2018)	Quarantine (2020)

Singles from Aurora
- 1. "Song Like You" Released: March 14, 2017; 2. "S.L.U.T." Released: October 6, 2017

Aurora (stylized in all lowercase) is the second studio album by American singer Bea Miller. It was released on February 23, 2018, by Hollywood Records. It's Miller's first album to be released internationally. It was preceded by three EPs, labeled as "chapters" which teased the release of a full-length album. The EPs were named after the primary colors; blue, red and yellow, each one including three songs. All of them along with five new songs were included in the final track listing.

== Singles ==
The first track "Song Like You" was released as the first single of Chapter One: Blue and was sent to mainstream radio on March 14, 2017. She made her first career late-night talk show performance with the song on March 30, 2017 at The Late Late Show with James Corden.

"S.L.U.T." was released as the official second single to promote the album. Miller performed the song on MTV's TRL on February 12, 2018.

== Track listing ==
Credits taken from Tidal and Qobuz.

No.	Title	Writer(s)	Producer(s)	Length
1.	"Song Like You"	Bea Miller; Ido Zmishlany	Zmishlany; Michel Heyaca	3:16
2.	"Burning Bridges"	Trevor Brown; Warren "Oak" Felder; Steph Jones; Miller; William Simmons	Oak; Trevorious^{[a]}; Zaire Koalo^{[a]}	3:38
3.	"Motherlove"	Felder; Brown; Sizzy Rocket; Miller; Simmons	Oak; Trevorious^{[a]}; Zaire Koalo^{[a]}	3:05
4.	"I Can't Breathe"	Julia Michaels; Miller; James Wong	Gladius	3:33
5.	"Like That"	Leah Haywood; Daniel James; Miller; Jarrad Rogers	Dreamlab; Rogers	3:05
6.	"Buy Me Diamonds"	Jones; Miller; Zmishlany	Zmishlany	3:13
7.	"Outside"	Christopher Blair; Miller; Dylan Bauld	Bauld	3:20
8.	"Girlfriend"	Cole Citrenbaum; Cara Salimando; Daniel Stanfill; Imad Royal	DJ Stanfill; Citrenbaum; Royal	2:57
9.	"Bored"	Jones; Miller; Mike Sabath	Sabath	2:56
10.	"Warmer"	Brown; Felder; Jones; Miller; Simmons	Oak; Trevorious^{[a]}; Zaire Koalo^{[a]}	3:14
11.	"Repercussions"	Michaels; Miller; Jesse Shatkin; Justin Tranter	Shatkin	3:27
12.	"S.L.U.T."	Jones; Miller; Zmishlany	Zmishlany	2:59
13.	"Crash&Burn" (featuring O'neill Hudson)	Jintae Ko; Spencer Bastian; Paris Carney; Miller	Bastian; Ko	2:39
14.	"To the Grave" (featuring Mike Stud)	Brown; Felder; Jones; Miller; Simmons	Oak; Trevorius^{[a]}; Zaire Koalo^{[a]}	3:57
Total length:				45:19

Notes

- "I Can't Breathe" includes background vocals by Gladius.
- "Buy Me Diamonds" includes background vocals by Steph Jones.
- "Outside" includes background vocals by Lostboycrow.
- "Girlfriend" includes background vocals by Cara Salimando.
- "S.L.U.T." includes background vocals by Steph Jones and Ido Zmishlany.
- All track titles are stylized in all lowercase letters, except "S.L.U.T.".

== Release history ==
Region	Date	Format(s)	Label	Ref.
Various	February 23, 2018	CD; digital download; LP	Hollywood	
United Kingdom	June 15, 2018	CD	Polydor	
Japan	June 19, 2018	CD	Hollywood; Universal Japan	
