= Ido Zmishlany =

American record producer and songwriter

- Genres: Pop; dance; alternative rock; indie rock
- Occupations: Record producer; songwriter
- Years active: 2013–present

Ido Zmishlany is an American record producer and songwriter. He has written and produced songs for various artists such as Justin Bieber, Khalid, Shawn Mendes, Imagine Dragons, The Chainsmokers, Grace VanderWaal, Needtobreathe, Jonas Brothers, Camila Cabello, Demi Lovato, Bea Miller, Sabrina Carpenter, Jennie and The All-American Rejects.

== Discography ==
| Year | Artist | Title | Label | Role |
|---|---|---|---|---|
| 2026 | Illit | "Mamihlapinatapai" | Belift Lab | Co-writer, Producer |
| 2025 | Jennie featuring Dominic Fike | "Love Hangover" | Odd Atelier / Columbia Records | Co-writer, Producer |
| 2025 | Jennie featuring Dua Lipa | "Handlebars" | Odd Atelier / Columbia Records | Producer |
| 2024 | Jimmy Fallon | Holiday Seasoning - ("Holiday (with Jonas Brothers)", "You'll Be There (with Justin Timberlake)", "How You Know It's Christmastime", "New Year's Eve Polka (5-4-3-2-1) (with "Weird Al" Yankovic & The Roots), "One Glove (with Will Ferrell)", "Hallmark Movie (with Cara Delevinge)") | Republic Records | Co-writer, Co-producer |
| 2024 | Ari Abdul | "Girls On The Internet" | Slumbo Labs / RCA Records | Co-writer, Co-producer |
| 2024 | Teddy Swims | "Apple Juice" | Warner Records | Co-writer, Co-producer |
| 2024 | Eden Golan | "Older" | Session 42 | Co-writer, Co-producer |
| 2024 | Perrie | "Tears" | Columbia Records | Producer |
| 2023 | Tate McRae | "calgary" | RCA Records | Co-writer, Co-producer |
| 2023 | Tate McRae | "grave" | RCA Records | Co-writer |
| 2023 | Sueco & Bea Miller | "Yours" | Atlantic Records | Co-writer, Co-producer |
| 2023 | Alana Springsteen | "amen" | Columbia Records | Co-writer, Co-producer |
| 2023 | Alana Springsteen ft. Chris Stapleton | "ghost in my guitar" | Columbia Records | Co-writer, Co-producer |
| 2023 | Bebe Rexha & David Guetta | "One In A Million" | Warner Records | Co-writer |
| 2023 | Natalie Jane & Charlieonnafriday | "I'm Good" | 10K Projects | Co-writer, Co-producer |
| 2023 | Delacey | The Girl Has A Dream | Photo Finish Records | Co-writer, co-producer |
| 2023 | Delacey | "Things I'd Save In A Fire" | Photo Finish Records | Co-producer |
| 2023 | Bebe Rexha | Bebe - ("Heart Wants What It Wants", "Miracle Man," "Seasons (feat. Dolly Parton)," "I'm Not High, I'm In Love") | Warner Records | Producer, writer |
| 2023 | Jonas Brothers | "Waffle House" | Republic Records | Co-writer, co-producer |
| 2023 | Delacey | "One Mississippi" | Photo Finish Records | Co-writer, co-producer |
| 2023 | Delacey | "Man On The Moon" | Photo Finish Records | Co-writer, co-producer |
| 2023 | Lyn Lapid ft. Ruth B. | "Do U Really?" | Mercury Records/ Republic Records | Co-writer, co-producer |
| 2022 | Jimmy Fallon ft Dolly Parton | "Almost Too Early For Christmas" | Republic Records | Producer, writer |
| 2022 | YUNGBLUD | "The Boy In The Black Dress" | Locomotion Recordings / Interscope Records | Co-writer |
| 2022 | Zella Day | "Mushroom Punch" | Concord Records | Co-writer |
| 2022 | Aldae | "Honeymoon" | Legends Only | Co-writer |
| 2022 | Matteo Bocelli | "Tempo" | Capitol Records | Producer, co-writer |
| 2021 | Thomas Day | "The New Me" | Arista Records | Producer, co-writer |
| 2021 | Jimmy Fallon ft Ariana Grande & Megan Thee Stallion | "It Was a... (Masked Christmas)" | Republic Records | Producer, writer |
| 2021 | ILLENIUM & Thirty Seconds To Mars | "Wouldn't Change A Thing" | Warner Records | Writer |
| 2021 | Surfaces ft. Thomas Rhett | "C'est La Vie" | Surfaces Music / 10K Projects | Producer, writer |
| 2021 | Shawn Mendes & Tainy | "Summer of Love" | Island Records | Producer, writer |
| 2021 | Lyn Lapid | "Infinite" | Republic Records | Producer, writer |
| 2021 | Delacey | "Drama Queen" | Hitmaker Music Group | Producer, writer |
| 2021 | Ruth B. | "Situation" | Reb Music Productions/ Downtown Records | Producer, writer |
| 2021 | Justin Bieber ft Khalid | "As I Am" | Def Jam | Producer, writer |
| 2021 | Jessie Murph | "Upgrade" | Columbia | Producer, writer, Label |
| 2020 | Quinn XCII | "Sleep While I Drive" ft Ashe | Columbia | Producer, writer |
| 2020 | Delacey | Black Coffee - ("Damn", "Black Coffee", "My Man", "The Subway Song", "No One's Gonna Ever Love U", "Unlovable", "Chapel", "Break Up Slow Dance", "Sad Gurl", "Actress", "Emily", "Too Poor to Live in LA") | Hitco | Exec Producer, Writer |
| 2020 | Juke Ross | Chapter 2 ("Atlanta", "Amazing") | RCA | Producer, writer |
| 2020 | Grace VanderWaal | "Today and Tomorrow" (From Disney's Stargirl) | Columbia, Syco | Producer, writer |
| 2020 | Angie Rose | "Infatuation" | Capitol CMG | Producer, writer |
| 2019 | Grace VanderWaal | LETTERS: VOL.1 ("Intro (Gucci Shoes)", "Poser", "UR So Beautiful", "Waste My Time", "The City") | Columbia, Syco | Producer, writer |
| 2019 | Milck | "If I Ruled The World" | Atlantic | Producer, writer |
| 2019 | Milck | "Slow Fade" | Atlantic | Producer, writer |
| 2019 | David Guetta ft. Brooks, Loote | "Better When Your Gone" | Parlophone | Writer |
| 2019 | Sophia Messa | "What Am I Gonna Do With You" | Arista | Producer, writer |
| 2018 | Stephen Puth | "Sexual Vibe" | Arista | Producer, writer |
| 2018 | Loren Gray | "Kick You Out" | Virgin/Capitol | Producer, writer |
| 2018 | Imagine Dragons | Origins ("Love") | Interscope/KidInAKorner | Producer, writer |
| 2018 | Rachel Platten | "You Belong" | Violet Records | Producer, writer |
| 2018 | Sabrina Carpenter | "Alone Together" | Hollywood Records | Producer, writer |
| 2018 | DNCE | People To People EP ("Man on Fire", "Lose My Cool") | Republic | Producer, writer |
| 2018 | Grace VanderWaal | "Clearly" | Columbia, Syco | Producer, writer |
| 2017 | The Chainsmokers ft. Florida Georgia Line | Memories...Do Not Open ("Last Day Alive") | Disruptor, Columbia | Writer |
| 2017 | The All-American Rejects | "Sweat" | Interscope Records | Producer, writer |
| 2017 | Demi Lovato | Tell Me You Love Me ("Ruin the Friendship") | Island, Safehouse, Hollywood | Producer, writer |
| 2017 | Bea Miller | Chapter One: Blue ("Song Like You") | Hollywood, Syco | Producer, writer |
| 2017 | Bea Miller | Chapter Two: Red ("Buy Me Diamonds") | Hollywood, Syco | Producer, writer |
| 2017 | Bea Miller | Chapter Three: Yellow ("S.L.U.T.") | Hollywood, Syco | Producer, writer |
| 2017 | Grace VanderWaal | Just the Beginning ("Moonlight", "Talk Good," "Florets," "Darkness Keeps Chasing Me") | Columbia, Syco | Producer; writer (except "Darkness Keeps Chasing Me") |
| 2017 | Audien and 3lau | "Hot Water" ft. Victoria Zaro | Blume Music | Writer |
| 2016 | Shawn Mendes | Illuminate ("Ruin") ("Three Empty Words") | Island, Universal | Writer |
| 2016 | Sabrina Carpenter | Evolution ("On Purpose," "Feels Like Loneliness," "No Words") | Hollywood Records | Producer, writer |
| 2016 | Sabrina Carpenter | "Smoke and Fire" | Hollywood Records | Producer, writer |
| 2016 | James TW | First Impressions ("Naked," "Sanctuary") | Island Records | Producer, writer |
| 2016 | NEEDTOBREATHE | Hard Love ("When I Sing," "Happiness") | Atlantic Records | Producer ("Happiness" only), writer |
| 2015 | Shawn Mendes | Handwritten ("Life of the Party," "Kid in Love," "Something Big," "A Little Too Much", "This Is What It Takes") | Island Records | Producer (except "This Is What It Takes), writer (except "A Little Too Much") |
| 2015 | Shawn Mendes | "I Know What You Did Last Summer" (featuring Camila Cabello) | Island Records | Producer, writer |
| 2014 | Shawn Mendes | "Something Big" | Island Records | Producer, writer |
| 2014 | Shawn Mendes | The Shawn Mendes EP ("Life of the Party, "Show You," "One of Those Nights") | Island Records | Producer, writer |
