= Shawn Mendes World Tour =

2016–17 concert tour by Shawn Mendes

- Tour by Shawn Mendes
- Location: North America • Europe • Oceania • Asia
- Associated album: Handwritten
- Start date: March 5, 2016
- End date: March 18, 2017
- Legs: 5
- No. of shows: 45
- Attendance: 95,461
- Box office: $6 million ($7.7 million in 2024 dollars)

Shawn Mendes concert chronology
- #ShawnsFirstHeadlines (2014–2015); Shawn Mendes World Tour (2016–17); Illuminate World Tour (2017)

The Shawn Mendes World Tour was the second concert tour by Canadian singer Shawn Mendes, promoting his debut studio album Handwritten (2015). The tour began in New York City at Radio City Music Hall on March 5, 2016, and it concluded in Manila at the Mall of Asia Arena on March 18, 2017.

== Background and development ==
Mendes announced he was headlining his first world tour after opening for Taylor Swift on The 1989 World Tour from May to October 2015. The tour was first announced with a show at Radio City Music Hall in New York City before hitting the road in Europe.

== Set list ==
This set list is representative of the show on March 5, 2016, in New York City. It is not representative of all concerts for the duration of the tour.

1. "Something Big"
2. "Life of the Party"
3. "The Weight"
4. "Aftertaste"
5. "A Little Too Much"
6. "Bring It Back"
7. "I Don't Even Know Your Name"
8. "Kid in Love"
9. "I Know What You Did Last Summer" (with Camila Cabello; On March 5)
10. "Ruin"
11. "Like This"
12. "Act Like You Love Me"
13. "Three Empty Words"
14. "Never Be Alone"
15. "Stitches"

== Tour dates ==
List of concerts, showing date, city, country, venue, opening acts, tickets sold, number of available tickets and amount of gross revenue
Date	City	Country	Venue	Opening acts	Attendance	Revenue
North America
March 5, 2016	New York City	United States	Radio City Music Hall	James TW	—	—
March 6, 2016 (Note: The March 6, 2016 concert in Houston, Texas at NRG Stadium was part of the 2016 Rodeo Houston.)	Houston	United States	NRG Stadium	James TW	—	—
March 19, 2016	Orlando	United States	Mardi Gras at Universal	James TW	—	—
Europe
April 16, 2016	Cologne	Germany	E-Werk	—	—	—
April 17, 2016	Amsterdam	Netherlands	Paradiso	—	—	—
April 19, 2016	Frederiksberg	Denmark	Falkonersalen	—	—	—
April 21, 2016	Stockholm	Sweden	Arena Fryshuset	James TW	—	—
April 22, 2016	Oslo	Norway	Oslo Spektrum	James TW	—	—
April 24, 2016	Berlin	Germany	Huxleys Neue Welt	—	—	—
April 27, 2016	Milan	Italy	Fabrique	—	—	—
April 29, 2016	Madrid	Spain	Barclaycard Center	—	—	—
May 2, 2016	Paris	France	Olympia	—	—	—
May 5, 2016	London	England	Eventim Apollo	—	—	—
May 6, 2016	London	England	Eventim Apollo	—	—	—
May 8, 2016	Lisbon	Portugal	MEO Arena	—	—	—
North America
July 15, 2016	Boca Raton	United States	Mizner Amphitheater	James TW	3,512 / 3,512	$140,480
July 16, 2016	St. Augustine	United States	St. Augustine Amphitheatre	James TW	3,796 / 3,796	$151,660
July 17, 2016	Atlanta	United States	Fox Theatre	James TW	4,377 / 4,377	$175,080
July 19, 2016	San Antonio	United States	Freeman Coliseum	James TW	6,703 / 6,703	$268,120
July 20, 2016	Grand Prairie	United States	Verizon Theatre	James TW	6,288 / 6,288	$245,840
July 22, 2016	Phoenix	United States	Comerica Theatre	James TW	4,628 / 4,628	$178,800
July 23, 2016	San Diego	United States	Cal Coast Credit Union Open Air Theatre	James TW	4,787 / 4,787	$181,400
July 24, 2016	San Jose	United States	Event Center Arena	James TW	4,542 / 4,542	$171,880
July 26, 2016	Seattle	United States	WaMu Theater	James TW	4,779 / 4,779	$182,800
July 27, 2016	Vancouver	Canada	Orpheum Theatre	James TW	2,629 / 2,629	$101,840
July 30, 2016	Magna	United States	The Great Saltair	—	4,221 / 4,221	$160,040
July 31, 2016	Broomfield	United States	1stBank Center	—	5,723 / 5,723	$220,720
August 2, 2016	Saint Paul	United States	Roy Wilkins Auditorium	—	4,150 / 4,150	$159,960
August 4, 2016 (Note: The August 4, 2016 concert in West Allis, Wisconsin at Wisconsin State Fair Park was part of the 2016 Wisconsin State Fair.)	West Allis	United States	Wisconsin State Fair Park	James TW	9,650 / 9,650	$313,179
August 5, 2016	Rosemont	United States	Rosemont Theatre	James TW	4,378 / 4,378	$166,800
August 6, 2016	St. Louis	United States	Fox Theatre	James TW	4,150 / 4,150	$160,320
August 7, 2016	Nashville	United States	The Woods at Fontanel	James TW	4,283 / 4,283	$168,320
August 10, 2016	Detroit	United States	Fox Theatre	James TW	4,750 / 4,750	$183,440
August 12, 2016	Baltimore	United States	Pier Six Pavilion	James TW	4,326 / 4,326	$164,680
August 13, 2016 (Note: The August 13, 2016 concert in Hamburg, New York at The Fairgrounds was part of the 2016 Erie County Fair.)	Hamburg	United States	The Fairgrounds	James TW	5,670 / 5,670	$244,920
August 14, 2016	Philadelphia	United States	Mann Center	James TW	11,432 / 11,432	$366,700
August 16, 2016	West Long Branch	United States	MAC	James TW	3,194 / 3,194	$120,280
August 17, 2016	Lowell	United States	Tsongas Center	James TW	5,124 / 5,124	$197,160
August 19, 2016	Uncasville	United States	Mohegan Sun Arena	James TW	7,061 / 7,061	$247,135
August 20, 2016 (Note: The August 20, 2016 concert in Hershey, Pennsylvania at Hersheypark Stadium was part of the 2016 Show Of The Summer.)	Hershey	United States	Hersheypark Stadium	—	—	—
August 21, 2016	Toronto	Canada	Air Canada Centre	James TW	13,743 / 13,743	$571,236
September 10, 2016	New York City	United States	Madison Square Garden	—	12,828 / 12,828	$674,353
Oceania
November 1, 2016	Sydney	Australia	Enmore Theatre	LYNK	4,744 / 4,744	$220,939
November 2, 2016	Sydney	Australia	Enmore Theatre	LYNK	4,744 / 4,744	$220,939
Asia
March 18, 2017 (Note: The concert of March 18, 2017 in Manila at the Mall of Asia Arena was originally planned to take place on October 26, 2016, but was rescheduled.)	Manila	Philippines	Mall of Asia Arena	—	—	—
Total					95,461 / 95,461	$3,821,592
