= 2015 Much Music Video Awards =

Annual edition of the awards show

- Date: June 21, 2015
- Location: 299 Queen Street West, Toronto, Canada
- Country: Canada
- Hosted by: Ed Sheeran; Liz Trinnear; Tyrone Edwards

Highlights
- Most nominations: The Weeknd (6)
- Website: http://mmva.muchmusic.com

Television/radio coverage
- Network: Much, CTV Two, M3, MTV

The 2015 Much Music Video Awards (MMVAs) were held on June 21, 2015 outside the Much headquarters in downtown Toronto. Ed Sheeran served as co-host for the show.

== Nominations ==
Winners are shown in bold type.

=== Video of the Year ===
- Arcade Fire – "We Exist"
- Grimes f. Blood Diamonds – "Go"
- Majid Jordan – "Her"
- Kiesza – "Giant in My Heart"
- **The Weeknd – "Often"**

=== Best Post–Production ===
- Grimes f. Blood Diamonds – "Go"
- SonReal – "For the Town"
- Walk off the Earth – "Rule the World"
- Young Wolf Hatchlings – "You Lovely You"
- **Zeds Dead f. Twin Shadow & D'Angelo Lacy – "Lost You"**

=== Best EDM/Dance ===
- **Grandtheft & Keys N Krates – "Keep It 100"**
- Kiesza – "Giant in My Heart"
- Mia Martina f. Waka Flocka Flame – "Beast"
- Torro Torro – "Ca$hville"
- Zeds Dead f. Twin Shadow & D'Angelo Lacy – "Lost You"

=== Best Director ===
- Arcade Fire – "We Exist" Director: David Wilson
- Grandtheft & Keys N Krates – "Keep It 100" Director: Ohji
- Grimes f. Blood Diamonds – "Go" Directors: Claire Boucher & Mac Boucher
- Majid Jordan – "Her" Director: Common Good
- **The Weeknd – "Often" Director: Sam Pilling**

=== Best Pop Video ===
- Hedley – "Heaven in Our Headlights"
- Scott Helman – "Bungalow"
- Lights – "Running with the Boys"
- Shawn Mendes – "Something Big"
- **The Weeknd – "Earned It"**

=== Best Rock/Alternative Video ===
- **Arcade Fire – "We Exist"**
- Arkells – "Leather Jacket"
- Death from Above 1979 – "Virgins"
- July Talk – "Summer Dress"
- Nickelback – "Edge of a Revolution"

=== Best Hip Hop Video ===
- Tory Lanez – "Henny in Hand"
- Naturally Born Strangers – "No One Knows My Struggle"
- **P Reign f. Drake & Future – "DnF"**
- John River – "Hope City II"
- SonReal – "Preach"

=== Best MuchFact Video ===
- Death from Above 1979 – "Virgins"
- Grandtheft & Keys N Krates – "Keep It 100"
- **Majid Jordan – "Forever"**
- Lights – "Running with the Boys"
- Torro Torro – "Ca$hville"

=== Best International Video – Artist ===
- Nick Jonas – "Jealous"
- Rihanna, Kanye West and Paul McCartney – "FourFiveSeconds"
- Sia – "Chandelier"
- Hozier – "Take Me to Church"
- Kendrick Lamar – "i"
- Calvin Harris – "Blame"
- **Ed Sheeran – "Thinking Out Loud"**
- Sam Smith – "I'm Not the Only One"
- Taylor Swift – "Blank Space"
- Ariana Grande – "Break Free"

=== Most Buzzworthy International Artist or Group ===
- Iggy Azalea – "Black Widow"
- Jason Derulo – "Want to Want Me"
- Fall Out Boy – "Centuries"
- **Ed Sheeran – "Thinking Out Loud"**
- Sia – "Chandelier"

=== Most Buzzworthy Canadian ===
- Justin Bieber – "Confident"
- Drake – "Worst Behavior"
- Kiesza – "Sound of a Woman"
- Shawn Mendes – "Life of the Party"
- **The Weeknd – "Earned It"**

=== Fan Fave Video ===
- Hedley – "Heaven in Our Headlights"
- Marianas Trench – "Here's to the Zeros"
- **Shawn Mendes – "Something Big"**
- Nickelback – "Edge of a Revolution"
- The Weeknd – "Earned It"

=== Fan Fave Artist or Group ===
- **Justin Bieber**
- Drake
- Carly Rae Jepsen
- Shawn Mendes
- The Weeknd

=== Fan Fave International Artist or Group ===
- Selena Gomez
- **One Direction**
- Ed Sheeran
- Sam Smith
- Taylor Swift

== Performers ==
=== Pre show ===
- OMI - Cheerleader

=== Main show ===
- Fall Out Boy – "Uma Thurman"
- Carly Rae Jepsen – "I Really Like You"
- Ed Sheeran – "Photograph"
- Tori Kelly – "Nobody Love"
- Scott Helman – "Bungalow"
- Walk Off The Earth – "Rule the World"
- The Weeknd – "The Hills"/"Earned It"
- Mia Martina feat. Waka Flocka Flame – "Beast"
- Shawn Mendes – "Stitches"
- Nick Jonas – "Chains"
- Ed Sheeran – "Thinking Out Loud"
- Jason Derulo – "Want to Want Me"

== Presenters ==
- Sarah Hyland
- Tyler Posey
- Gigi Hadid
- Hailee Steinfeld
- Bella Thorne
- Debby Ryan
- Cody Simpson
- Echosmith
- Nate Ruess
- Francesco Yates
- Adam Lambert
- Shawn Hook
- Lights
- Arkells
- Marianas Trench
- Tyler Shaw
- Dan Talevski
