= Illuminate World Tour =

2017 concert tour by Shawn Mendes

- Tour by Shawn Mendes
- Promotional poster
- Location: Europe • North America • Oceania • Asia • South America
- Associated album: Illuminate
- Start date: April 27, 2017
- End date: December 18, 2017
- Legs: 5
- No. of shows: 60
- Attendance: 648,742
- Box office: $37.8 million ($49.65 million in 2025 dollars)

Shawn Mendes concert chronology
- Shawn Mendes World Tour (2016–2017); Illuminate World Tour (2017); Shawn Mendes: The Tour (2019)

The Illuminate World Tour was the third concert tour by Canadian singer Shawn Mendes, in support of his second studio album Illuminate (2016). The tour began in SSE Hydro, Glasgow, April 27, 2017, and concluded in Tokyo at the Tokyo International Forum on December 18, 2017.

== Background and development ==
After huge success from the Shawn Mendes World Tour, Mendes headlined his first all-arena tour. Mendes kicked off his tour in Europe for 21 shows, and North-America was set for 29 shows.

On February 22, 2017, Charlie Puth was announced as the opening act for the North American leg of the tour, and Rock in Rio announced Mendes as a performer of the festival in Rio de Janeiro.

== Critical reception ==
In a concert review from London Evening Standard, Matilda Egere-Cooper praised his vocals and his ability to make the concert enjoyable and meaningful at the same time, while writing, "he's got a lovely, soulful voice, reminiscent of Justin Timberlake, with a few dashes of Ed Sheeran. Then there is his musicianship, not only strumming along with a four-piece band, but twice on the piano. The second came at the end of the show on Treat You Better, which eventually descended into the hand-clapping slab of pop brilliance it's known for." The review rewarded the concert 4 out of 5 stars. Ryan Potter from Toronto Star wrote, "Mendes really did perform like this was an all-or-nothing show for him, not just month four on a nine-month world tour," while also noting how Mendes is still the same eager crowd-pleaser he was the last time he played the Air Canada Centre, while giving the show 3 out of 4 stars. Sadie Bell from Billboard praised his "seamless transitions from acoustic and electric guitars to piano, along with his impressively consistent vocals and high energy." Bell ends off by saying it was clear that Mendes was "destined to be far more than an internet phenomenon."

== Set list ==
This set list is representative of the show on August 17, 2017, in Newark. It is not representative of all concerts for the duration of the tour.

1. "There's Nothing Holdin' Me Back"
2. "Lights On"
3. "I Don't Even Know Your Name" / "Aftertaste" / "Kid in Love"
4. "I Want You Back"
5. "The Weight"
6. "A Little Too Much"
7. "Stitches"
8. "Bad Reputation"
9. "Ruin"
10. "Castle on the Hill" / "Life of the Party"
11. "Three Empty Words"
12. "Patience"
13. "Roses"
14. "No Promises"
15. "Understand"
16. "Don't Be a Fool"
17. "Mercy"
18. "Never Be Alone"

Encore

19. "Treat You Better"

== Tour dates ==
List of concerts, showing date, city, country, venue, opening acts, tickets sold, number of available tickets and amount of gross revenue
Date	City	Country	Venue	Opening act	Attendance	Revenue
Europe
April 27, 2017	Glasgow	Scotland	SSE Hydro	James TW	11,143 / 11,143	$573,111
April 28, 2017	Manchester	England	Manchester Arena	James TW	14,899 / 14,899	$749,022
April 30, 2017	Oberhausen	Germany	König Pilsener Arena	James TW	10,271 / 10,271	$534,232
May 1, 2017	Amsterdam	Netherlands	Ziggo Dome	James TW	12,376 / 12,376	$568,762
May 3, 2017	Berlin	Germany	Mercedes-Benz Arena	James TW	11,817 / 11,817	$590,190
May 4, 2017	Vienna	Austria	Wiener Stadthalle	James TW	10,725 / 10,725	$557,400
May 6, 2017	Milan	Italy	Mediolanum Forum	James TW	9,531 / 9,531	$512,040
May 9, 2017	Madrid	Spain	WiZink Center	James TW	7,982 / 7,982	$474,788
May 10, 2017	Lisbon	Portugal	MEO Arena	James TW	12,474 / 12,474	$606,913
May 12, 2017	Barcelona	Spain	Palau Sant Jordi	James TW	11,202 / 11,202	$644,300
May 14, 2017	Zürich	Switzerland	Hallenstadion	James TW	12,063 / 13,000	$799,372
May 15, 2017	Munich	Germany	Olympiahalle	James TW	10,990 / 10,990	$568,347
May 17, 2017	Stockholm	Sweden	Ericsson Globe	James TW	11,342 / 11,342	$624,676
May 19, 2017	Oslo	Norway	Telenor Arena	James TW	8,007 / 8,007	$700,236
May 21, 2017	Copenhagen	Denmark	Forum Copenhagen	James TW	7,038 / 7,038	$444,581
May 22, 2017	Hamburg	Germany	Barclaycard Arena	James TW	11,985 / 12,988	$633,485
May 24, 2017	Paris	France	AccorHotels Arena	James TW	11,037 / 11,037	$722,458
May 27, 2017	Brussels	Belgium	Palais 12	James TW	9,242 / 9,242	$452,694
May 30, 2017	Dublin	(Republic of Ireland) Ireland	3Arena	James TW	8,674 / 8,674	$641,209
June 1, 2017	London	England	The O_{2} Arena	James TW	31,942 / 32,228	$1,535,870
June 2, 2017	London	England	The O_{2} Arena	James TW	31,942 / 32,228	$1,535,870
North America
July 6, 2017	Portland	United States	Moda Center	Charlie Puth	12,718 / 12,718	$563,506
July 8, 2017	Vancouver	Canada	Rogers Arena	Charlie Puth	11,944 / 12,578	$658,946
July 9, 2017	Seattle	United States	KeyArena	Charlie Puth	11,655 / 11,827	$571,611
July 11, 2017	Oakland	United States	Oracle Arena	Charlie Puth	13,798 / 13,798	$797,363
July 12, 2017	Los Angeles	United States	Staples Center	Charlie Puth	13,445 / 13,610	$812,975
July 14, 2017	San Diego	United States	Valley View Casino Center	Charlie Puth	10,354 / 10,486	$507,726
July 15, 2017	Glendale	United States	Gila River Arena	Charlie Puth	13,310 / 13,310	$584,916
July 17, 2017	Denver	United States	Pepsi Center	Charlie Puth	11,958 / 12,286	$532,151
July 19, 2017	Dallas	United States	American Airlines Center	Charlie Puth	12,996 / 13,434	$680,395
July 21, 2017	San Antonio	United States	AT&T Center	Charlie Puth	13,310 / 13,310	$573,043
July 22, 2017	Houston	United States	Toyota Center	Charlie Puth	11,748 / 11,748	$580,149
July 25, 2017	Tampa	United States	Amalie Arena	Charlie Puth	12,479 / 12,479	$552,602
July 26, 2017	Miami	United States	American Airlines Arena	Charlie Puth	13,177 / 13,177	$629,472
July 28, 2017	Orlando	United States	Amway Center	Charlie Puth	12,233 / 12,233	$619,430
July 29, 2017	Duluth	United States	Infinite Energy Arena	Charlie Puth	10,319 / 10,319	$582,086
July 31, 2017	Nashville	United States	Bridgestone Arena	Charlie Puth	13,558 / 13,558	$718,875
August 2, 2017	Cleveland	United States	Quicken Loans Arena	Charlie Puth	12,811 / 12,811	$636,823
August 3, 2017	Rosemont	United States	Allstate Arena	Charlie Puth	13,000 / 13,000	$761,528
August 5, 2017	Omaha	United States	CenturyLink Center Omaha	Charlie Puth	12,456 / 12,456	$571,515
August 6, 2017	Saint Paul	United States	Xcel Energy Center	Charlie Puth	14,105 / 14,105	$766,872
August 11, 2017	Toronto	Canada	Air Canada Centre	Charlie Puth	27,972 / 27,972	$1,579,750
August 12, 2017	Toronto	Canada	Air Canada Centre	Charlie Puth	27,972 / 27,972	$1,579,750
August 14, 2017	Montreal	Canada	Bell Centre	Charlie Puth	15,427 / 15,427	$963,863
August 16, 2017	Brooklyn	United States	Barclays Center	Charlie Puth	13,687 / 13,687	$741,191
August 17, 2017	Newark	United States	Prudential Center	Charlie Puth	12,541 / 12,541	$663,481
August 19, 2017	Washington, D.C.	United States	Capital One Arena	Charlie Puth	13,531 / 13,531	$741,522
August 20, 2017	Pittsburgh	United States	PPG Paints Arena	Charlie Puth	12,989 / 12,989	$627,641
August 22, 2017	Philadelphia	United States	Wells Fargo Center	Charlie Puth	14,028 / 14,028	$731,611
August 23, 2017	Boston	United States	TD Garden	Charlie Puth	13,065 / 13,065	$771,325
South America
September 16, 2017 (Note: The show on September 16, 2017, in Rio de Janeiro, Brazil is a part of the Rock in Rio festival.)	Rio de Janeiro	Brazil	Barra Olympic Park	—N/a	—N/a	—N/a
Oceania
November 25, 2017	Auckland	New Zealand	Spark Arena	Julia Michaels	—N/a	—N/a
November 29, 2017	Brisbane	Australia	Brisbane Entertainment Centre	Julia Michaels	8,526 / 8,526	$558,964
December 1, 2017	Sydney	Australia	Qudos Bank Arena	Julia Michaels	12,747 / 12,931	$805,283
December 3, 2017	Melbourne	Australia	Rod Laver Arena	Julia Michaels	11,277 / 11,277	$764,253
December 6, 2017	Perth	Australia	Perth Arena	Julia Michaels	7,219 / 7,380	$456,597
Asia
December 9, 2017	Singapore		The Star Performing Arts Centre	—N/a	—N/a	—N/a
December 11, 2017	Bangkok	Thailand	IMPACT Arena	—N/a	—N/a	—N/a
December 13, 2017	Hong Kong		AsiaWorld–Arena	—N/a	—N/a	—N/a
December 18, 2017	Tokyo	Japan	Tokyo International Forum	—N/a	—N/a	—N/a
Total					750,463 / 754,903 (99.39%)	$35,041,151

== Cancelled shows ==
List of cancelled concerts, showing date, city, country, venue and reason for cancellation
Date	City	Country	Venue	Reason
September 20, 2017	Mexico City	Mexico	Auditorio Nacional	2017 Central Mexico earthquake
