= Chapter One: Blue =

EP by Bea Miller
- Released: February 24, 2017
- Recorded: February 2016
- Length: 10:25
- Label: Hollywood
- Producer: Ido Zmishlany; Michel Heyaca; Oak Felder; Treviorious; Zaire Koalo; Gladius

Bea Miller chronology
Not an Apology (2015)	Chapter One: Blue (2017)	Chapter Two: Red (2017)

Singles from Chapter One: Blue
- 1. "Song Like You" Released: March 14, 2017

Chapter One: Blue (stylized in all lowercase) is the second extended play (EP) by American singer Bea Miller. It was released on February 24, 2017 by Hollywood Records. Two more "chapters" (EPs) were released during 2017 as part of her second album, Chapter Two: Red, released on June 2, 2017 and Chapter Three: Yellow on October 6, 2017. On February 23, 2018, the full album Aurora was released including all the songs of the three previous EPs, plus five new tracks.

== Singles ==
The first track "Song Like You" was released as the lead single from Chapter One: Blue and was sent to mainstream radio on March 14, 2017.

== Track listing ==
No.	Title	Writer(s)	Producer(s)	Length
1.	"Song Like You"	Bea Miller; Ido Zmishlany	Zmishlany; Michel Heyaca	3:16
2.	"Burning Bridges"	Trevor Brown; Warren "Oak" Felder; Steph Jones; Miller; William Simmons	Oak Felder; Trevorious^{[a]}; Zaire Koalo^{[a]}	3:37
3.	"I Can't Breathe"	Julia Michaels; Miller; James Wong	Gladius	3:32
Total length:				10:25

Notes

- ^{^[a]} signifies a co-producer

== Personnel ==
Credits adapted from Qobuz.

- Jorge Gutiérrez – assistant recording engineer
- James "Gladius" Wong – background vocals, composer, piano, producer, programming
- Trevor "Trevorious" Brown – composer, co-producer, songwriter
- Warren "Oak" Feder – composer, engineer, producer, songwriter
- Steph Jones – composer, songwriter
- Julia Michaels – composer, songwriter
- Bea Miller – composer, songwriter, vocals
- William Simons – composer, songwriter
- Ido Zmishlany – composer, engineer, producer, songwriter
- Zaire Koalo – co-producer
- Phil English – engineer
- Chris Gehringer – mastering
- Erik Madrid – mixing
- Michel Heyaca – producer

== Release history ==
Country	Date	Format	Label	Ref.
Various	February 24, 2017	Digital download	Hollywood	
