= Chapter Three: Yellow =

EP by Bea Miller
- Released: October 6, 2017
- Recorded: June 2016
- Length: 10:22
- Label: Hollywood
- Producers: Jesse Shatkin; Oak Felder; Trevor Brown; Zaire Koalo; Ido Zmishlany

Bea Miller chronology
Chapter Two: Red (2017)	Chapter Three: Yellow (2017)	Aurora (2018)

Singles from Aurora
- 1. "S.L.UT." Released: October 6, 2017

Chapter Three: Yellow (stylized in all lowercase) is the fourth extended play (EP) by the American singer Bea Miller. It was released on October 6, 2017, by Hollywood Records. The EP is the third and final part of a trilogy of EPs, following the release of the first two chapters, Chapter One: Blue and Chapter Two: Red. It is the last of Miller's releases before the release of her second studio album, Aurora, on February 23, 2018, which consist of all the songs from the three chapters and also five new songs. Miller has described the EP as "It's like you’ve made it out of this situation, and you've gotten past one hurdle in your life, and it's kind of like, 'Okay, I've gotten through one thing, and now I'm ready to face the next'".

== Track listing ==
Chapter Three: Yellow
No.	Title	Writer(s)	Producer(s)	Length
1.	"Repercussions"	Julia Michaels; Bea Miller; Jesse Shatkin; Justin Tranter	Shatkin	3:28
2.	"S.L.U.T."	Steph Jones; Miller; Ido Zmishlany	Zmishlany	2:59
3.	"To the Grave" (featuring Mike Stud)	Trevor Brown; Warren "Oak" Felder; Jones; Miller; William Zaire Simmons	Oak; Brown^{[a]}; Zaire Koalo^{[a]}	3:58

Notes

- "Repercussions" and "To the Grave" are stylized in all lowercase letters.
- ^{^[a]} signifies a co-producer

== Personnel ==
Credits adapted from Qobuz.

- Bea Miller – lead vocals, composer, songwriter
- Mike Stud – featured artist, songwriter
- Jesse Shatkin – recording engineer, programmer, composer, producer, songwriter
- Alex Spencer – assistant recording engineer
- Keith Sorrels – assistant recording engineer
- Todd Norman – assistant recording engineer
- Trevor "Trevorious" Brown – composer, co-producer, songwriter
- Warren "Oak" Felder – composer, engineer, producer, songwriter
- Julia Michaels – composer, songwriter
- Justin Tranter – composer, songwriter
- Steph Jones – songwriter, background vocals
- Ido Zmishlany – composer, engineer, producer, songwriter
- Zaire Koalo – co-production
- Erik Madrid – mixing
- James Royo – mixing
