= Chapter Two: Red =

EP by Bea Miller
- Released: June 2, 2017
- Recorded: April 2016
- Genre: Electropop
- Length: 9:42
- Label: Hollywood
- Producer: Dreamlab; Oak Felder; Jarrad Rogers; Treviorious; Zaire Koalo; Ido Zmishlany

Bea Miller chronology
| Chapter One: Blue (2017) | Chapter Two: Red (2017) | Chapter Three: Yellow (2017) |

Chapter Two: Red (stylized in all lowercase) is the third extended play (EP) by American singer Bea Miller. It was released on June 2, 2017 by Hollywood Records. The EP is the second part of a trilogy of EPs, which follows the release of Chapter One: Blue on February 24, 2017, and precedes Chapter Three: Yellow, released on October 6, 2017. On February 23, 2018 the full album Aurora was released including all the songs of the three previous EPs, plus five new tracks.

== Track listing ==
| No. | Title | Writer(s) | Producer(s) | Length |
|---|---|---|---|---|
| 1. | "Like That" | Leah Haywood; Daniel James; Bea Miller; Jarrad Rogers | Dreamlab; Rogers | 3:16 |
| 2. | "Buy Me Diamonds" | Steph Jones; Miller; Ido Zmishlany | Ido Zmishlany | 3:12 |
| 3. | "Warmer" | Trevor Brown; Warren "Oak" Felder; Steph Jones; Miller; William Simmons | Oak Felder; Trevorious^{[a]}; Zaire Koalo^{[a]} | 3:14 |
| Total length: | | | | 9:42 |

Notes

- ^{^[a]} signifies a co-producer

== Personnel ==
Credits adapted from Qobuz.

- Raphael Bautista – assistant recording engineer
- Jorge Gutiérrez – assistant recording engineer
- Trevor "Trevorious" Brown – composer, co-producer, songwriter
- Warren "Oak" Felder – composer, engineer, producer, songwriter
- Leah Haywood – composer, songwriter
- Daniel James – composer, songwriter
- Steph Jones – composer, songwriter
- Bea Miller – composer, songwriter, vocals
- Jarrad Rogers – composer, engineer, producer, songwriter, mixing
- William Simons – composer, songwriter
- Ido Zmishlany – composer, engineer, producer, songwriter
- Zaire Koalo – co-production
- Dreamlab – engineering, production, programming
- Chris Gehringer – mastering
- Erik Madrid – mixing
- James Royo – mixing

== Release history ==
| Country | Date | Format | Label | Ref. |
|---|---|---|---|---|
| Various | June 2, 2017 | Digital download | Hollywood | |
