= Soundiiz =

Online tool for converting and managing music playlists across streaming services

- Company type: Private
- Founded: January 9, 2013; 13 years ago
- Headquarters: France
- Country of origin: France
- Founders: Thomas Magnano, Benoit Herbreteau
- Website: soundiiz.com
- Current status: Active

Soundiiz is a playlist converter/manager for several music streaming sites. It provides automated transfer of playlists, as well as a single interface as which to manage and synchronize between such, such as Deezer, Apple Music, SoundCloud, Amazon Music, YouTube, Qobuz, Spotify, Napster, Tidal, Discogs, as well as others.

In April 2015, Tidal partnered with Soundiiz.

Starting May 2020, Soundiiz is providing a SmartLink feature to share playlists and releases to customers whatever music services they are using.
