= Relief (Mike Stud album) =

Studio album by Mike Stud
- Released: May 13, 2013
- Genre: Hip hop
- Length: 41:28
- Label: Electric Pop RED Distribution
- Producer: The Arsenals, Johnny Rain, Luke Walker, Julkeyz, Judge, Swedes

Mike Stud chronology
#SundayStudDay (2012)	Relief (2013)	Closer (2014)

Relief is the debut studio album by American rapper Mike Stud, released on May 13, 2013. Relief chronicles Stud’s journey from his years as an All American pitcher at Duke, to his side-lining and ultimate career-ending injury, and his rise as a rapper.

== Release and promotion ==
=== Singles ===
Prior to the album's release, Stud posted videos for three of the album's tracks on his YouTube page. The first -- "Perfect For Me"—was released on February 11, 2013. This video was followed by an official video for "F**k That" on March 27 and "Past Gone" on April 8, of the same year.

== Commercial performance ==
The album debuted at number 109 on the Billboard 200 chart, with first-week sales of 4,200 copies in the United States. In its second week the album sold 7,600 more copies bringing its total sales to 12,000.

== Track listing ==
No.	Title	Producer(s)	Length
1.	"Thank You"		3:45
2.	"Young King"	Johnny Rain	3:43
3.	"Just Let Go"		3:32
4.	"Batter Up"		3:14
5.	"I'm Not Sorry"		3:24
6.	"Bad Habits" (featuring Kinetics)	One Love	4:34
7.	"Kids"		2:57
8.	"Feels Good Right Here"	Marty Rod	3:09
9.	"Oh No"		3:27
10.	"F**k That"	The Arsenals, Luke Walker	3:21
11.	"Perfect For Me"	Julkeyz	2:20
12.	"Past Gone"	Judge, Swedes	4:02

== Charts ==
Chart (2013)	Peak position
US Billboard 200	55
US Heatseekers Albums (Billboard)	1
US Top R&B/Hip-Hop Albums (Billboard)	8
