= When You Love Someone (James TW song) =

Single by James TW

from the EP First Impressions and the album Chapters
- Released: 19 August 2016
- Genre: Pop
- Length: 3:36
- Label: Island Records

James TW singles chronology
"Black & Blue" (2015)	"When You Love Someone" (2016)	"Crazy" (2016)

Music video
- "When You Love Someone" on YouTube

"When You Love Someone" is a song performed by British singer and songwriter James TW. The song was released as a digital download on 19 August 2016 by Island Records as the lead single from his second extended play First Impressions (2016).

== Live performances ==
On 23 January 2017, James TW performed "When You Love Someone" on The Ellen DeGeneres Show.

== Context ==
James TW explained in a 1:12 minute YouTube video that he came up with the song during the time he was teaching some children to play musical instruments. He found out that the parents of one of the children he was teaching were getting divorced. The child was 11 years old at the time, and James thought that he would write a song showing how the parents would explain to their son in a way he would understand, and put in a positive way the separation of a child's parents. James wanted a song that his music student and other children passing through a similar situation could listen to, to give them hope and make them realise that "what happened in life was perhaps for the best".

== Music video ==
A music video to accompany the release of "When You Love Someone" was first released onto YouTube on 19 February 2016 at a total length of three minutes and forty-six seconds.

== Track listing ==
Album version
No.	Title	Length
1.	"When You Love Someone"	3:36

Digital download
No.	Title	Length
1.	"When You Love Someone" (Acoustic)	3:30

== Charts ==
=== Weekly charts ===
Chart (2016)	Peak position
Netherlands (Dutch Top 40)	24
Netherlands (Single Top 100)	51
Scotland (OCC)	38
Sweden (Sverigetopplistan)	24
UK Singles (OCC)	54
US Adult Pop Airplay (Billboard)	28

=== Year-end charts ===
Chart (2017)	Position
Denmark (Tracklisten)	93
Sweden (Sverigetopplistan)	98

== Certifications ==
Certifications for "When You Love Someone"
Region	Certification	Certified units/sales
Brazil (Pro-Música Brasil)	Gold	30,000^{‡}
Denmark (IFPI Danmark)	3× Platinum	270,000^{‡}
France (SNEP)	Gold	100,000^{‡}
Italy (FIMI)	Gold	25,000^{‡}
New Zealand (RMNZ)	3× Platinum	90,000^{‡}
Norway (IFPI Norway)	2× Platinum	120,000^{‡}
Spain (PROMUSICAE)	Gold	30,000^{‡}
Sweden (GLF)	Platinum	40,000^{‡}
United Kingdom (BPI)	2× Platinum	1,200,000^{‡}
United States (RIAA)	Platinum	1,000,000^{‡}
^{‡} Sales+streaming figures based on certification alone.

== Release history ==
Region	Date	Format	Label
United Kingdom	19 August 2016	Digital download	Island Records
