= Closer (Mike Stud album) =

Studio album by Mike Stud
- Released: July 7, 2014
- Recorded: 2013–2014
- Genre: Hip hop
- Length: 45:58
- Label: Electric Feel Music, 300 Entertainment, Atlantic Records
- Producer: Louis Bell

Mike Stud chronology
| Relief (2013) | Closer (2014) |

Singles from Closer
- 1. "Out Here" Released: May 4, 2014; 2. "Closer" Released: June 25, 2014

Closer is the second studio album by American rapper Mike Stud released on July 7, 2014.

== Release and promotion ==
=== Singles ===
A music video for the lead album single, "Out Here," was posted to YouTube on May 4, 2014. Prior to the album's release, Stud posted a music video for the album's title track on his YouTube page. Both tracks were produced by Louis Bell.

== Track listing ==
All tracks produced by Louis Bell.

All tracks are written by Louis Bell.

| No. | Title | Length |
|---|---|---|
| 1. | "Closer" | 3:39 |
| 2. | "All Good" | 3:34 |
| 3. | "On & On" (featuring Conrad Sewell) | 3:28 |
| 4. | "Out Here" | 3:07 |
| 5. | "Submarine" (featuring Micky Blue (Written by Micky Blue, Ben Samama, David Veslocki)) | 2:56 |
| 6. | "Thinking Of You" | 3:16 |
| 7. | "Boys Of The Summer" | 2:56 |
| 8. | "This One's For You" | 3:15 |
| 9. | "Movie" | 3:19 |
| 10. | "Super Faded" (featuring Conrad Sewell) | 3:23 |
| 11. | "You Already Know" | 3:03 |
| 12. | "Dose Of You" | 3:15 |
| 13. | "I'm Not Sorry" | 3:25 |
| 14. | "Smile For Me" | 3:21 |

== Charts ==
| Chart (2014) | Peak position |
|---|---|
| US Billboard 200 | 13 |
| US Top R&B/Hip-Hop Albums (Billboard) | 2 |
