= Island Life (disambiguation) =

Island Life may refer to:

- Island Life, a book by Alfred Russel Wallace published in 1881
- Island Life, a compilation album by Grace Jones released in December 1985
- "Island Life", the first single by the English electronic music band Fluke released in 1988
- "Island Life", a song by Janet Jackson from her 2004 album Damita Jo
- Island Life, 2005 album by Yerba Buena
