= James TW =

- Born: James Taylor-Watts; 27 October 1997 (age 28); Barford, Warwickshire, England
- Genres: Pop
- Occupation: Singer-songwriter
- Instruments: Vocals, guitar, drums
- Years active: 2014–present
- Labels: Island
- Website: jamestw.com

James Taylor-Watts (born 27 October 1997), better known as James TW, is an English singer-songwriter. His single "When You Love Someone" peaked at number 28 on the Billboard Adult Pop Songs chart.

== Early life ==
Taylor-Watts was born in England, the son of Sarah and Richard Taylor-Watts. He was named after James Taylor, one of his parents' favourite musicians.

Taylor-Watts' father, who played guitar in a wedding band as a hobby, once found a young James playing on the drum kit at home. Shortly thereafter, the band's drummer wasn't able to make it to a gig. So the band had a decision to make: either let 10 year-old Taylor-Watts play or cancel the gig. Taylor-Watts played that evening and has been performing on a regular basis ever since. He picked up guitar at 12 years old and started playing piano the following year. In 2010, Taylor-Watts started his YouTube channel at 12 years old.

== Career ==
=== 2014–2016: Just a Number and First Impressions ===
In 2014, Taylor-Watts self-released the EP Just a Number, which rose to number 6 on the iTunes Singer/Songwriter chart. In early 2015, Shawn Mendes, an artist discovered on social media, found Taylor-Watts on YouTube and praised him on Twitter. Mendes' label, Island Records, then noticed Taylor-Watts and he signed with them shortly thereafter. On 30 October 2015, Taylor-Watts released his debut single "Black & Blue". On 19 February 2016, he released a music video for his single, "When You Love Someone", through Universal Music. The song reached over 60 million Spotify streams and peaked at number 28 on Billboard's Adult Pop Songs chart.

On 15 April 2016, Taylor-Watts released his debut EP titled First Impressions, featuring five original songs as well as a cover of "Torn" by Natalie Imbruglia, which earned 17 million Spotify streams and peaked at 15 on the Spotify Viral 50 chart. Taylor-Watts was the sole opening act on the sold out Shawn Mendes World Tour. On 9 September 2016, he released a cover of Gnarls Barkley's "Crazy".

=== 2017–present: Chapters and Heartbeat Changes ===
On 23 January 2017, Taylor-Watts performed "When You Love Someone" on The Ellen DeGeneres Show. He released the single "Ex" on 17 February 2017 while premiering the video via Billboard on the same day. In February, he was named the opening act on the European leg of Shawn Mendes' Illuminate World Tour with dates from April to June 2017.

Taylor-Watts released a new single called "You & Me" on 18 January 2019. The song, alongside "When You Love Someone", "Say Love" and "Soldier", was included on his debut album Chapters, which was released the following April.

Taylor-Watts announced in March 2021 that he would be releasing the single "Butterflies" on 19 March 2021. In September, he released the EP Heartbeat Changes (Part 1), followed by his second full-length album Heartbeat Changes on 10 June 2022. The album comprises the songs from the EP plus seven new tracks.

== Discography ==
=== Albums ===
Title	Details	Peak chart positions			
Title	Details	BEL (FL)	NLD	NOR	SWE
Chapters	Released: 26 April 2019; Label: Island; Formats: CD, digital download, streaming	113	77	18	33
Heartbeat Changes	Released: 10 June 2022; Label: Island; Formats: Digital download, streaming	—	—	—	—
Soundtrack	Released: 22 November 2024; Label: James TW	—	—	—	—

=== Extended plays ===
Title	Details
Just a Number	Released: 2014; Label: Self-released; Format: Digital download
First Impressions	Released: 15 April 2016; Label: Island; Format: Digital download

=== Singles ===
Year	Title	Peak chart positions						Certifications	Album
Year	Title	UK	NLD	NOR	NZ Hot	SWE	US Adult	Certifications	Album
2015	"Black & Blue"	—	—	—	—	—	—		Non-album single
2016	"When You Love Someone"	54	51	—	—	24	28	BPI: 2× Platinum; GLF: Platinum; IFPI NOR: 2× Platinum; RIAA: Platinum; RMNZ: 3× Platinum	First Impressions and Chapters
2016	"Crazy"	—	—	—	—	—	—		Non-album singles
2017	"Ex"	—	—	—	—	—	—		Non-album singles
2017	"Please Keep Loving Me"	—	—	—	—	—	—	BPI: Silver; IFPI NOR: Gold; RMNZ: Gold	Non-album singles
2018	"Say Love"	—	—	26	—	30	—	GLF: Platinum; IFPI NOR: 2× Platinum; RMNZ: Gold	Chapters
2018	"Last Christmas"	—	—	—	22	38	—		Non-album single
2018	"Soldier"	—	—	—	—	—	—		Chapters
2019	"You & Me"	—	—	—	—	61	—	BPI: Silver; IFPI NOR: Gold; RIAA: Gold; RMNZ: Gold	Chapters
2021	"Butterflies"	—	—	—	—	—	—		Heartbeat Changes
2021	"Hopeless Romantics"	—	—	—	—	— (Note: "Hopeless Romantics" did not enter the Swedish Singellista Chart, but peaked at number 11 on the Swedish Heatseeker Chart.)	—		Heartbeat Changes
2023	"Another Heart"	—	—	—	—	—	—		Non-album single
