= Handwritten (Shawn Mendes album) =

Studio album by Shawn Mendes
- Released: April 14, 2015
- Recorded: May 2014 – March 2015
- Studios: Noble Street Studios (Toronto, Ontario)
- Genre: Pop rock
- Length: 39:29
- Label: Island
- Producers: Ido Zmishlany; Martin Terefe; Teddy Geiger; Sam Watters; Louis Biancaniello; Daniel Parker; Daylight; Scott Harris; Craven J; Geoff Warburton; Shawn Mendes

Shawn Mendes chronology
The Shawn Mendes EP (2014)	Handwritten (2015)	Illuminate (2016)

Singles from Handwritten
- 1. "Something Big" Released: November 7, 2014; 2. "Stitches" Released: May 5, 2015; 3. "I Know What You Did Last Summer" Released: November 18, 2015

Handwritten is the debut studio album by Canadian singer Shawn Mendes, released on April 14, 2015, by Island Records. It debuted at number one on the US Billboard 200 with first-week sales of 119,000 album-equivalent units, of which 106,000 copies were pure album sales, becoming the tenth artist to chart under the age of 18. The album includes "Stitches", which reached top 5 on the US Billboard Hot 100 and number one on the UK Singles Chart. The album's reissue, Handwritten (Revisited) features the US top 20 single "I Know What You Did Last Summer". To promote the album, Mendes performed in several television shows and awards. Two concert tours were also supported by the album: ShawnsFirstHeadlines and Shawn Mendes World Tour.

== Background ==
After signing a record deal with Island Records in June 2014 at 15 years old, Mendes released his debut single "Life of the Party" which peaked at number 24 on the US Billboard Hot 100. Following the single release, an EP titled The Shawn Mendes EP was released on July 28, 2014, and sold 48,000 copies in its first week. Mendes announced his debut album title and artwork on January 27, 2015, and it was made available to pre-order on February 2, 2015.

Handwritten was reissued in a revisited edition on November 20, 2015. It includes five live recordings tracks from the Greek Theatre and four brand new songs.

== Singles ==
"Something Big", was released as the album's first single on November 7, 2014. The official music video for the song premiered on November 11, 2014, on Vevo, and it is Mendes' first official music video.

"Stitches", was released as the album's second single on May 5, 2015. The song debuted on the Billboard Hot 100 chart of June 13, 2015, at number 89 and became his first top 10, peaking at number 4. It also peaked at No. 1 in the UK Singles Chart in January 2016 and became Mendes' first UK chart-topper.

"I Know What You Did Last Summer", was released as a single from a revisited edition of the album on November 18, 2015. The song is a collaboration with Cuban-American singer Camila Cabello. It has peaked at number 20 on the Billboard Hot 100 chart. In the UK the song peaked at number 42.

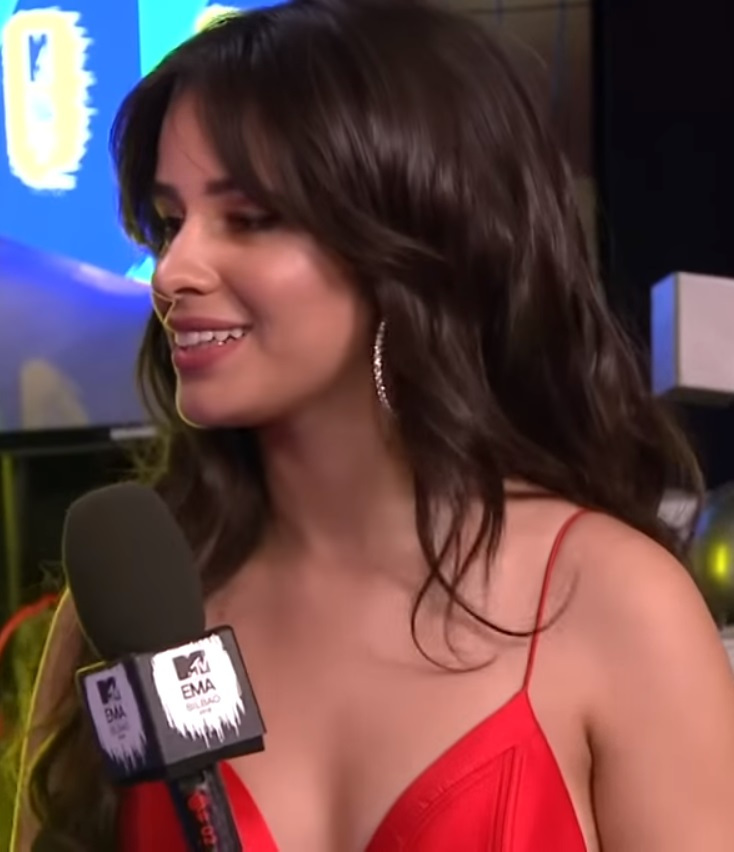
Camila Cabello collaborated with Mendes on "I Know What You Did Last Summer".

=== Other songs ===
"Life of the Party", was released as the lead single from Mendes debut EP The Shawn Mendes EP on 25 June 2014, it was later included on Handwritten.

Before the album release, Mendes released five songs through pre-order on iTunes. The first song "A Little Too Much", was released on February 2, the same day the album pre-order started. A music video for the song premiered on the singer's Vevo on February 4. Mendes announced through Instagram that the second promotional song would be "Never Be Alone" and it was made available on February 16. An official music video for the song was released on February 25. On March 16 the singer released "Stitches", the third pre-order single, which official music video premiered on March 18. An acoustic version of "Life of the Party", featured in the deluxe version of the album, was released as the fourth pre-order single on March 30 at midnight, the same day as it was made possible to hear every song preview on iTunes. "Kid in Love", was made available as the fifth and final pre-order track on April 6 at midnight, just a week before the album release, while a music video for the acoustic version of "Life of the Party", was posted on Shawn Mendes' Vevo on April 10. "Aftertaste" also gained a music video, which was posted on April 17.

== Commercial performance ==
The album debuted at number one on the US Billboard 200, selling 119,000 album-equivalent units in its first week, of which 106,000 copies were pure album sales. He became the youngest artist since Justin Bieber to have a No. 1 album on the Billboard 200 album chart in nearly five years. Bieber was 16 years and 2 months old when his album My World 2.0 spent its fourth and final week at the top. Mendes was 16 years and 8 months old. In its second week, the album descended to number seventeen with 20,000 equivalent album units, of which 12,000 copies were pure album sales, an 89% pure album sales decrease (from 106,000 copies), surpassing Madonna's MDNA (2012) for the biggest second-week percentage drop for a number-one debuting album in the Nielsen SoundScan era. As of August 2016, Handwritten has sold 391,000 copies in the United States.

In his native Canada, the album debuted at number one with first-week sales of 14,000 copies, according to Nielsen SoundScan. In its second week, the album descended to number six.

== Critical reception ==
Professional ratings
Aggregate scores
Source	Rating
Metacritic	58/100
Review scores
Source	Rating
AllMusic	2.5/5 stars
Billboard	3/5 stars
Digital Spy	3/5 stars
The Guardian	3/5 stars
Idolator	2.5/5 stars
Newsday	B+
NY Daily News	3/5 stars
Rolling Stone	3/5 stars
USA Today	2.5/4 stars

Handwritten received mixed reviews from music critics. At Metacritic, which assigns a "weighted average" rating out of 100 from selected independent ratings and reviews from mainstream critics, the album received a Metascore of 58, based on five reviews.

Billboard's editor Carl Wilson called Handwritten "a promising teen's first album" but ended his review by opining that "so far, though, Mendes' music is not nearly as inventive as his strategies to publicize it." Lewis Corner of Digital Spy felt that the record was at its best "when Mendes veers slightly away from the soppy sentiments" and that "his vocal tone is clear and distinct, and the songs are packed with hooks and heart" but that "he faces a challenge ahead of him to convince a broader audience, and there are moments here that fall short of that," ending his review by opining that the album is "a sturdy enough foundation to ensure he doesn't disappear just as quickly." Writing for The Guardian, Caroline Sullivan rated the album three-out-of-five stars and claims: "At 16, Mendes isn’t the artist he’ll be at 25, but he’s made a persuasive start – the adult-pop big league could yet be his."

Glenn Gamboa of Newsday felt that the album "goes well beyond what you'd expect from your average teen sensation" and that "he tackles a wide range of styles and topics and handles them all well." Jim Farber of NY Daily News complimented Mendes' overall look and sound and wrote that "a bright future for Mendes seems guaranteed." Nick Murray from Rolling Stone described Mendes as a "nice-guy guitar strummer more influenced by the light acoustic pop of Ed Sheeran." Writing for USA Today, Brian Mansfield opined that the album "has the simplicity and vulnerability of a carefully folded love note passed surreptitiously in class" while noting that he "aches to be more than ordinary."

In a more negative review, Christina Lee of Idolator wrote that Handwritten "has its tiny moments of spark, but it also gets dull because of how self-serious he is" and that it "seems like he’s afraid to overstep any boundaries" while also writing that "if he hadn’t already invited fans into his world, he’d have to try harder with his music to captivate them," although she did specifically compliment "Life of the Party," "Stitches," and "I Don't Even Know Your Name." Writing for AllMusic, Stephen Erlewin criticized the songwriting and production while writing that Mendes had enough time "to learn how to engage a listener for at least 60 seconds, but Handwritten is pretty thin gruel" and that "he can't hold the audience's attention for any longer than on Vine, relying on his puppy-dog eyes and croon to get him through a song."

=== Accolades ===
Year	Organization	Award	Result	Ref.
2016	Juno Awards	Album of the Year	Nominated	
2016	Juno Awards	Pop Album of the Year	Nominated	

== Track listing ==
Handwritten – Standard edition
No.	Title	Writer(s)	Producer(s)	Length
1.	"Life of the Party"	Ido Zmishlany; Scott Harris	Zmishlany	3:35
2.	"Stitches"	Daniel Parker; Teddy Geiger; Daniel "Daylight" Kyriakides	Daylight; Geiger; Parker	3:27
3.	"Never Be Alone"	Shawn Mendes; Scott Harris; Martin Terefe; Glen Scott	Terefe	3:36
4.	"Kid In Love"	Mendes; Zmishlany; Harris	Zmishlany; Terefe	3:46
5.	"I Don't Even Know Your Name"	Mendes; Harris; Terefe; Geoffrey Warburton	Terefe	3:00
6.	"Something Big"	Mendes; Zmishlany; Harris	Zmishlany	2:41
7.	"Strings"	Mendes; Harris; Emily Warren	Louis Biancaniello; Sam Watters	3:11
8.	"Aftertaste"	Mendes; Harris; Warren	Biancaniello; Watters	2:50
9.	"Air" (featuring Astrid S)	Harris; Warren	Craven J; Harris	3:14
10.	"Crazy"	Mendes; Warburton; Terefe	Mendes; Warburton	3:12
11.	"A Little Too Much"	Mendes	Zmishlany	3:07
12.	"This Is What It Takes"	Mendes; Warburton; Terefe; Zmishlany; Harris	Terefe	3:50
Total length:				39:29

Handwritten – Standard 2016 edition
No.	Title	Writer(s)	Producer(s)	Length
13.	"I Know What You Did Last Summer" (with Camila Cabello)	Cabello; Mendes; Zmishlany; Noel Zancanella; Bill Withers	Zancanella; Zmishlany (add.)	3:43
Total length:				43:12

Handwritten – Deluxe edition (bonus tracks)
No.	Title	Writer(s)	Producer(s)	Length
13.	"Bring It Back"	Mendes; Warburton; Terefe	Terefe	2:40
14.	"Imagination"	Mendes; Terefe; Scott	Terefe	3:38
15.	"The Weight"	Mendes; Harris; Joshua Grant	Craven J; Harris (add.)	3:05
Total length:				48:52

Handwritten – Deluxe 2016 edition
No.	Title	Writer(s)	Producer(s)	Length
16.	"I Know What You Did Last Summer" (with Camila Cabello)	Cabello; Mendes; Zmishlany; Noel Zancanella; Bill Withers	Zancanella; Zmishlany (add.)	3:43
Total length:				52:35

Handwritten – iTunes deluxe edition (bonus track)
No.	Title	Writer(s)	Producer(s)	Length
16.	"Life of the Party" (Acoustic)	Zmishlany; Harris	Zmishlany	3:14
Total length:				52:06

Handwritten – iTunes deluxe 2016 edition
No.	Title	Writer(s)	Producer(s)	Length
17.	"I Know What You Did Last Summer" (with Camila Cabello)	Cabello; Mendes; Zmishlany; Noel Zancanella; Bill Withers	Zancanella; Zmishlany (add.)	3:43
Total length:				55:49

Handwritten – Target exclusive deluxe edition and HMV Canada exclusive edition (bonus tracks)
No.	Title	Writer(s)	Producer(s)	Length
16.	"Don't Want Your Love"	Mendes; Zmishlany; Warburton	Zmishlany	2:51
17.	"Lost"	Mendes; Warren; Harris; Grant	Craven J; Harris	3:16
18.	"Handwritten Demos"			9:01
Total length:				64:00

Handwritten – Revisited edition
No.	Title	Writer(s)	Producer(s)	Length
4.	"Kid in Love" (Live At Greek Theater / 2015)	Mendes; Zmishlany; Harris	Zmishlany; Terefe	4:17
5.	"I Don't Even Know Your Name" (Live At Greek Theater / 2015)	Mendes; Harris; Terefe; Warburton	Terefe	3:37
7.	"Strings" (Live At Greek Theater / 2015)	Scott Friedman; Shawn Mendes; Emily Schwartz	Biancaniello; Watters	3:45
8.	"Aftertaste" (Live At Greek Theater / 2015)	Scott Friedman; Shawn Mendes; Emily Schwartz	Biancaniello; Watters	2:38
11.	"A Little Too Much" (Live At Greek Theater / 2015)	Mendes	Zmishlany	3:09
13.	"I Know What You Did Last Summer" (with Camila Cabello)	Cabello; Mendes; Zmishlany; Noel Zancanella; Bill Withers	Zancanella; Zmishlany (add.)	3:43
14.	"Act Like You Love Me"	Mendes; Warburton	Jacquire King	3:25
15.	"Running Low"	Mendes	Jordan Orvosh	4:34
16.	"Memories"	Mendes; Warburton; Max River	Jacquire King	3:51

Handwritten – Revisited edition (Walmart exclusive bonus track)
No.	Title	Length
17.	"Stitches" (live)

== Personnel ==
Credits for Handwritten adapted from AllMusic.

- Blossom Berkofsky – photography
- Ziggy Chareton – A&R
- Chris Gehringer – mastering
- Teddy Geiger – composer
- Scott Harris – composer
- Jessica Kelly – design
- Daniel Kyriakides – composer
- David Massey – A&R
- Shawn Mendes – composer, vocals
- Daniel Parker – composer
- Andy Proctor – package production
- Gabrielle Rosen – A&R
- Todd Russell – art direction, design
- Glen Scott – composer
- Martin Terefe – composer
- Meredith Truax – photography
- Keith R. Tucker – A&R
- Josiah Vandien – photography
- Geoffrey Warburton – composer
- Emily Warren – composer
- Craven J – composer
- Ido Zmishlany – composer

== Charts ==
=== Weekly charts ===
Chart (2015–16)	Peak position
Australian Albums (ARIA)	18
Austrian Albums (Ö3 Austria)	37
Belgian Albums (Ultratop Flanders)	23
Belgian Albums (Ultratop Wallonia)	46
Canadian Albums (Billboard)	1
Danish Albums (Hitlisten)	2
Dutch Albums (Album Top 100)	5
Finnish Albums (Suomen virallinen lista)	29
French Albums (SNEP)	74
German Albums (Official Top 100)	43
Greek Albums (IFPI)	30
Irish Albums (IRMA)	11
Italian Albums (FIMI)	10
New Zealand Albums (RMNZ)	18
Norwegian Albums (VG-lista)	1
Portuguese Albums (AFP)	5
Taiwanese Albums (Five Music)	8
Scottish Albums (Official Charts)	13
Spanish Albums (Promusicae)	2
Swedish Albums (Sverigetopplistan)	4
Swiss Albums (Schweizer Hitparade)	26
UK Albums (Official Charts)	12
US Billboard 200	1

=== Year-end charts ===
Chart (2015)	Position
Canadian Albums (Billboard)	40
Spanish Albums (PROMUSICAE)	74
Swedish Albums (Sverigetopplistan)	6
US Billboard 200	34
Chart (2016)	Position
Belgian Albums (Ultratop Flanders)	163
Canadian Albums (Billboard)	24
Danish Albums (Hitlisten)	10
Dutch Albums (MegaCharts)	22
Spanish Albums (PROMUSICAE)	100
Swedish Albums (Sverigetopplistan)	23
UK Albums (OCC)	76
US Billboard 200	33
Chart (2017)	Position
Danish Albums (Hitlisten)	33
Swedish Albums (Sverigetopplistan)	44
US Billboard 200	176
Chart (2018)	Position
Danish Albums (Hitlisten)	56
Swedish Albums (Sverigetopplistan)	69
Chart (2019)	Position
Belgian Albums (Ultratop Flanders)	182
Danish Albums (Hitlisten)	85
Swedish Albums (Sverigetopplistan)	99

== Certifications ==
Region	Certification	Certified units/sales
Australia (ARIA)	Gold	35,000^{‡}
Austria (IFPI Austria)	Platinum	15,000^{*}
Canada (Music Canada)	5× Platinum	400,000^{‡}
Colombia (ASINCOL)	Gold	
Denmark (IFPI Danmark)	5× Platinum	100,000^{‡}
Germany (BVMI)	Gold	100,000^{‡}
Italy (FIMI)	Gold	25,000^{‡}
Mexico (AMPROFON)	Gold	30,000^{^}
New Zealand (RMNZ)	2× Platinum	30,000^{‡}
Norway (IFPI Norway)	Platinum	30,000^{‡}
Poland (ZPAV)	Platinum	20,000^{‡}
Singapore (RIAS)	Platinum	10,000^{*}
Spain (Promusicae)	Gold	20,000^{‡}
Sweden (GLF)	2× Platinum	60,000^{‡}
United Kingdom (BPI)	Platinum	300,000^{‡}
United States (RIAA)	2× Platinum	2,000,000^{‡}
^{*} Sales figures based on certification alone.^{^} Shipments figures based on certification alone.^{‡} Sales+streaming figures based on certification alone.

== Release history ==
Region	Date	Format	Label	Edition
United States	April 14, 2015	CD; digital download	Island	Standard; deluxe
United States	November 20, 2015	CD; CD+DVD; LP; digital download	Island	Revisited

== See also ==
- List of 2015 albums
- List of Billboard 200 number-one albums of 2015
- List of number-one albums of 2015 (Canada)
- List of number-one albums of 2015 (Norway)
