= Mike Stud =

American rapper (born 1988)

- Born: Michael Francis Seander; October 30, 1988 (age 37); Cranston, Rhode Island, U.S.
- Genres: Hip hop; Frat rap; country; pop
- Occupations: Rapper; singer; entrepreneur; former baseball player
- Years active: 2010–present
- Labels: 4TheHomies; Electric Feel; 300; Atlantic

Michael Francis Seander (born October 30, 1988), known professionally as Mike (stylized as mike.; formerly Mike Stud), is an American rapper, singer and former baseball player. His first musical recognition came with the release of his viral single "College Humor", which he recorded on GarageBand ironically while he was a relief pitcher at Duke University.

== Early life ==
In 2006, Seander graduated from St. Raphael Academy in Pawtucket, Rhode Island. At 6 ft 2 in (1.88 m), he lettered in both baseball and basketball and was named Rhode Island's 2006 Gatorade Player of the Year, earning him an athletic scholarship to Duke University. Seander earned 2nd team all-state honors in basketball after averaging 21 points and 7 rebounds as a senior. He earned an 8-2 record with a 0.72 ERA and 88 strikeouts for the Saints as a junior. In his senior season, he posted a 9-2 record, an ERA of 0.91, and struck out 107 en route to being named both the Gatorade Player of the Year and Louisville Slugger Player of the Year in Rhode Island.

== Baseball career ==
=== Duke ===
Seander attended Duke University in Durham, North Carolina, to play baseball for the Blue Devils. While at Duke, he was teammates with pitcher Marcus Stroman, who would later appear on the remix of the title track of Seander's 2016 album These Days. In 2007, Seander saved nine games in 28 appearances and earned a 1.61 ERA (lowest in Duke University baseball history). Those nine saves were the fifth highest total in school history and was good for fourth best in the ACC that season. At season's end, Seander was named to the Louisville Slugger and Rivals.com Freshman All-American teams. The Rhode Island native also spent a summer in 2007 as the closer for the Newport Gulls in the NECBL. In 2008, Seander pitched in just three games due to elbow tendinitis and went 2–0 with a 4.05 ERA in 6 2/3 innings pitched. The injury would later require Tommy John surgery. In the summer, he pitched for the Wareham Gatemen of the Cape Cod League. After missing the entire 2009 season recovering from the surgery, Seander appeared on the ACC Academic Honor Roll for the second year. In 2010, he appeared in nine games for the Blue Devils, striking out nine in 8 2/3 innings pitched.

=== Georgetown ===
In 2010, Seander transferred to Georgetown University in Washington, D.C. to play for the Hoyas. In 21 appearances, he held a 4.29 ERA with 16 strikeouts and one save in 21 innings of work. He earned a graduate degree in sports management.

== Music career ==
While recovering from surgery, Stud turned to music to pass the time.

In December 2010, Stud released a music video for "College Humor". Stud stated that he originally made the track as a joke for his baseball teammates. Since its release, the video has been viewed over 2.5 million times (as of April 2021). In March, Stud followed up his hit with "In This Life", which featured West Coast rapper Alex Lagemann.

All three hits were featured on Stud's first mixtape—A Toast to Tommy—which he released in October 2011. In August, Stud released another mixtape, Click, as a collaboration with fellow hip-hop artist Huey Mack.

On May 13, 2013, Stud released his debut studio album Relief.

On July 7, 2014, he released his second album Closer.

On October 30, 2015, he released an 8-track mini-album, This Isn't the Album, a mix of previously released singles and new tracks.

On January 12, 2016, Stud released his third studio album, These Days, which includes a feature from former Toronto Blue Jays pitcher and former Duke teammate, Marcus Stroman.

Mike most recently starred in a TV show on the Esquire Network called This Is Mike Stud. The show follows him and his crew around on his most recent Back2YouTour. The show premiered Tuesday, June 21, 2016.

In 2017, Stud was featured on "To the Grave" by American singer-songwriter Bea Miller, which is included on her EP, Chapter Three: Yellow and her second studio album, Aurora.

On November 12, 2018, Stud released his fourth album, 4TheHomies, which included 23 songs and features from Vory and Goody Grace. The album is very special to Stud, as the pinned tweet reads, "Hey guys. I released a new project last night. 23 songs that are basically the last 2 years of my life in music form. I made every song in my house. this shit couldn't be more me. I hope u guys have as much fun listening as we did making it."

In 2018, Stud began his Final Mike Stud Tour, leading many fans to believe it was his last tour ever. However, he clarified this by saying he was merely changing his stage name to "Mike" after the tour concluded.

In 2021, the highs., was mike.'s first album released under his new stage name.

In 2022, mike. released “Why Not Us?” in collaboration with Skeez.

In 2023, mike. released EP "Love," on Valentines Day.

In 2024, mike. released “the lows.” the second album in a series that will be concluded with “the inbetweens.”

== Discography ==
=== Albums ===
- Relief (2013)
- Closer (2014)
- These Days (2016)
- 4TheHomies (2018)
- Uhyuready? (2019)
- the highs. (2021) – No. 56 US Billboard 200
- Why Not Us? (2022)
- Love, (2023)
- the lows. (2024)

=== Mixtapes ===
- A Toast to Tommy (2011)
- Click with Huey Mack (2012)
- #SundayStudTape (2013)
- #SundayStudTapeVol.2 (2013)
- It's Spring Break, Homie (2015)
- This Isn't the Album (2015)
