= I Know What You Did Last Summer (song) =

Single by Shawn Mendes and Camila Cabello

from the album Handwritten (Revisited)
- Released: November 18, 2015
- Recorded: 2015
- Genre: Pop
- Length: 3:43
- Label: Island
- Songwriters: Shawn Mendes; Camila Cabello; Ido Zmishlany; Noel Zancanella; Bill Withers
- Producers: Ido Zmishlany; Noel Zancanella

Shawn Mendes singles chronology
"Stitches" (2015)	"I Know What You Did Last Summer" (2015)	"Treat You Better" (2016)

Camila Cabello singles chronology
"I Know What You Did Last Summer" (2015)	"Bad Things" (2016)

Music video
- "I Know What You Did Last Summer" on YouTube

"I Know What You Did Last Summer" is a song by Canadian singer Shawn Mendes and American singer and then-Fifth Harmony member Camila Cabello. The song serves as Cabello's debut single as a solo artist and was released as the lead single from the reissue of Mendes' debut studio album, Handwritten (Revisited) (2015), via Island Records on November 18, 2015. It reached the top 20 on the US Billboard Hot 100 and on the Canadian Hot 100. Mendes and Cabello promoted the song with several televised performances, including on The Tonight Show Starring Jimmy Fallon and at the 2016 People's Choice Awards. Mendes and Cabello later collaborated on "Señorita" in June 2019.

== Background and composition ==
"I Know What You Did Last Summer" was written backstage spontaneously on one of Taylor Swift's The 1989 World Tour stops, in which Mendes was an opening act and Cabello was the surprise guest as part of the group Fifth Harmony. "We were just backstage. There were like 100 people in my dressing room at the time, and it was madness back there, but I had this guitar and I was just jamming out, and we basically wrote a pre-chorus and a chorus in like 30 minutes," Mendes said in a video released about the making of this song. "And we planned to go into the studio, and it was like an 11-hour studio session where we finished writing the song." After a live performance on Live with Kelly and Michael, Cabello said, "We were just kind of jamming out. We weren’t really just writing a song. We kind of started spitting out melodies and put lyrics to it; I don't think we knew we had a song."

The artists co-wrote "I Know What You Did Last Summer" with its producers Ido Zmishlany and Noel Zancanella, with Bill Withers receiving songwriting credits for the sampling of his 1971 single "Ain't No Sunshine" and Ryan Tedder also receiving songwriting credits. Cabello described "I Know What You Did Last Summer" as a "conversation between two people in a relationship where it's dying, but nobody wants to admit that it's dying." The song is sung in A minor and set in common time with a tempo of 114 beats per minute.

== Commercial performance ==
"I Know What You Did Last Summer" debuted at number ninety-seven on Billboard Hot 100 for the chart dated December 5, 2015, and jumped to number fifty-five on the following week. On the week ending January 9, 2016, the song jumped from number forty-six to number thirty-three. The song has since peaked at number twenty for the chart dated January 30, 2016, becoming Mendes' second top 20 single, after "Stitches", which peaked at number four on November 7, 2015.

== Music video ==
A music video for the song was released on November 20, 2015, and was directed by Ryan Pallotta. In the video, Mendes and Cabello, ages 17 and 18 respectively at the time of the making of the song and filming of the video, are seen walking through a dark and desolated landscape. They keep trying to walk towards each other but are not moving. They are seen weathering a sandstorm, followed by a snowstorm and a rainstorm which culminates in a standoff of sorts. The music video has over 412 million views and 4.1 million likes as of January 2024.

== Live performances ==
Mendes and Cabello's first televised performance of "I Know What You Did Last Summer" was on Live with Kelly and Michael on November 20, 2015. They also performed the song on The Late Late Show with James Corden on November 23, 2015, and at Pitbull's New Year's Revolution on December 31, 2015, in Miami, Florida. Mendes and Cabello performed the track again on The Tonight Show Starring Jimmy Fallon on January 4, 2016.

Preceded by a performance of "Stitches", Mendes and Cabello sang "I Know What You Did Last Summer" at the 2016 People's Choice Awards. They also performed together on The Ellen DeGeneres Show on February 15, 2016. Mendes and Cabello performed the track again at the Radio City Music Hall on March 5, 2016, in New York.

Mendes and Cabello also performed the track while on the 2015 iHeartRadio Jingle Ball tour in December, on the following dates: 1, 4, 11, 16, 18 and 19.

Mendes added the single to his setlist on his tour, Shawn Mendes: The Tour, as a medley with "Señorita"—which Cabello also features in—and "Mutual". The single was also added to his setlist on his first solo concert tour, Shawn Mendes World Tour.

== Track listings ==
- Digital download
1. "I Know What You Did Last Summer" – 3:43
- Digital download – Radio Edit
1. "I Know What You Did Last Summer" (Radio Edit) – 3:11

== Accolades ==
Year	Organization	Award	Result	Ref.
2016	iHeartRadio Much Music Video Awards	Fan Fave Video	Won	
2016	iHeartRadio Much Music Video Awards	Best Pop Video	Won	
2016	iHeartRadio Much Music Video Awards	Video of the Year	Nominated	
2016	Premios Juventud	Favorite Hit	Nominated	
2016	Teen Choice Awards	Choice Music: Breakup Song	Nominated	

== Charts ==
=== Weekly charts ===
Chart (2015–2016)	Peak position
Australia (ARIA)	33
Belgium (Ultratop 50 Flanders)	21
Belgium (Ultratip Bubbling Under Wallonia)	22
Canada Hot 100 (Billboard)	19
Canada CHR/Top 40 (Billboard)	21
Canada Hot AC (Billboard)	24
Czech Republic Airplay (ČNS IFPI)	27
Czech Republic Singles Digital (ČNS IFPI)	14
Denmark (Tracklisten)	21
France (SNEP)	192
Germany (GfK)	90
Greece Digital Songs (Billboard)	9
Hungary (Rádiós Top 40)	7
Hungary (Single Top 40)	26
Hungary (Stream Top 40)	26
Ireland (IRMA)	42
Italy (FIMI)	53
Netherlands (Dutch Top 40)	12
Netherlands (Single Top 100)	17
New Zealand Heatseekers (Recorded Music NZ)	1
Norway (VG-lista)	18
Poland Airplay (ZPAV)	27
Portugal (AFP)	12
Slovakia Airplay (ČNS IFPI)	67
Slovakia Singles Digital (ČNS IFPI)	19
Sweden (Sverigetopplistan)	24
Switzerland (Schweizer Hitparade)	51
UK Singles (Official Charts)	42
US Billboard Hot 100	20
US Adult Pop Airplay (Billboard)	28
US Pop Airplay (Billboard)	10
US Digital Song Sales (Billboard)	5

=== Year-end charts ===
Chart (2016)	Position
Canada (Canadian Hot 100)	86
Hungary (Rádiós Top 40)	49
Netherlands (Dutch Top 40)	64
Netherlands (Single Top 100)	69
US Billboard Hot 100	86

== Certifications ==
Region	Certification	Certified units/sales
Australia (ARIA)	2× Platinum	140,000^{‡}
Brazil (Pro-Música Brasil)	Diamond	250,000^{‡}
Canada (Music Canada)	5× Platinum	400,000^{‡}
Denmark (IFPI Danmark)	Platinum	90,000^{‡}
Italy (FIMI)	Gold	25,000^{‡}
Mexico (AMPROFON)	Gold	30,000^{‡}
New Zealand (RMNZ)	2× Platinum	60,000^{‡}
Norway (IFPI Norway)	Platinum	40,000^{‡}
Poland (ZPAV)	Platinum	50,000^{‡}
Portugal (AFP)	Platinum	20,000^{‡}
Sweden (GLF)	Platinum	40,000^{‡}
United Kingdom (BPI)	Platinum	600,000^{‡}
United States (RIAA)	3× Platinum	3,000,000^{‡}
^{‡} Sales+streaming figures based on certification alone.
