= The Shawn Mendes EP =

EP by Shawn Mendes
- Released: July 28, 2014
- Recorded: 2014
- Length: 13:09
- Label: Island

Shawn Mendes chronology
| The Shawn Mendes EP (2014) | Handwritten (2015) |

Singles from The Shawn Mendes EP
- 1. "Life of the Party" Released: June 26, 2014

The Shawn Mendes EP is the debut extended play by Canadian singer Shawn Mendes, released on July 28, 2014 by Island Records. It debuted at number 5 on the U.S. Billboard 200 chart with sales of 48,000 copies in its first week. The EP includes the single "Life of the Party", which was a moderate success. The extended play was later removed from the iTunes Store and "Show You", "One of Those Nights" and "The Weight" were released as separate promotional singles. "The Weight" was included in the deluxe edition of Mendes' debut studio album Handwritten. As of April 2016, the EP has sold 103,000 copies in the United States.

== Background ==
After signing with Island Records in May 2014, Mendes began working on his self-title debut EP. The first single, "Life of the Party", was released on June 25, 2014. The song was a success, debuting at number 24 on the Billboard Hot 100 on July 12, 2014. This made him the youngest artist to debut in the top 25 of the Hot 100 since Justin Bieber's "One Less Lonely Girl" in 2009, and the youngest artist ever to debut in the top 25 with their debut single.

Speaking about the songwriting process, Mendes shared that "Show You" is the song he connects the most with on the EP, saying "I really love that song. The meaning behind it is basically to tell people that there is always going to be someone who tells you, you cannot do this. A lot of people told me I wouldn’t be able to handle the stress because I am so young for whatever. Or you can’t be the captain of your soccer team because you are too heavy, or not fast enough, whatever the reason is that people say you cannot do something, show them you can do it. It is a very empowering song and it makes me feel super uplifted and proud when I sing it. It’s cool."

== Promotion ==
Mendes appeared on The Ellen DeGeneres Show to perform "Life of the Party", and announce that he would be doing a mini headlining tour in support of the EP.

== Commercial performance ==
Following its release, "The Shawn Mendes EP" reached the number one spot on iTunes just 37 minutes after it was released at midnight on July 28, 2014. By the end of the week, Mendes had sold 48,000 copies of the EP in the United States, giving him his first top 5 album on the Billboard 200.

== Track listing ==
| No. | Title | Writer(s) | Length |
|---|---|---|---|
| 1. | "Life of the Party" | Ido Zmishlany; Scott Harris | 3:34 |
| 2. | "Show You" | Harris; Shawn Mendes; Martin Terefe; Zmishlany | 3:00 |
| 3. | "One of Those Nights" | Harris; Mendes; Zmishlany | 3:30 |
| 4. | "The Weight" | Joshua Grant; Harris; Mendes | 3:03 |
| Total length: | | | 13:07 |

== Charts ==
| Chart (2014) | Peak position |
|---|---|
| Canadian Albums (Billboard) | 5 |
| New Zealand Albums (RMNZ) | 36 |
| US Billboard 200 | 5 |
| US Indie Store Album Sales (Billboard) | 9 |
