= Stitches (Shawn Mendes song) =

2015 single by Shawn Mendes

- Seeb Remix artwork

Single by Shawn Mendes

from the album Handwritten
- Released: May 5, 2015
- Recorded: 2014
- Genre: Pop
- Length: 3:27
- Label: Island; Republic
- Songwriters: Danny Parker; Teddy Geiger
- Producers: Daylight; Teddy Geiger; Danny Parker

Shawn Mendes singles chronology
"Something Big" (2014)	"Stitches" (2015)	"I Know What You Did Last Summer" (2015)

Music video
- "Stitches" on YouTube

"Stitches" is a song by Canadian singer Shawn Mendes from his debut studio album, Handwritten (2015). It was initially released to iTunes via Island Records on March 16, 2015, as the third pre-order exclusive track and was subsequently serviced to radio via Republic Records on May 5, 2015, as the album's second single. "Stitches" is the first song by Mendes to appear on a Billboard airplay chart, debuting at number 36 on the Mainstream Top 40 chart in June 2015, and eventually reaching number one. It became his first top 10 single on the Billboard Hot 100, charting at number four. "Stitches" also reached the top 10 on the Canadian Hot 100, peaking at number 10. It also topped the Slovenian SloTop50 Chart, Scottish Official Charts Company and UK Singles Chart and reached the top 5 in Germany, Ireland, Australia and New Zealand.

It was nominated for Choice Music Single: Male Artist at the 2015 Teen Choice Awards.

== Background ==
"Stitches", a pop ballad, is the last major single recorded by Shawn Mendes after being signed to Island Records. The song is in the key of D♭ major with a tempo of 150 beats per minute and a time signature of 4/4. Mendes's vocals span one and a half octave, from D♭_{3} to an A♭_{4} belt after the bridge which continues into the chorus. It was written and produced by Danny Parker, Teddy Geiger, and Daniel Kyriakides, and recorded by Mendes in 2014. After that, it was initially released to iTunes via Island Records on March 16, 2015, as the third pre-order exclusive track and was subsequently serviced to radio via Republic Records on May 5, 2015, as the album's third official single.

The official music video of "Stitches" takes place in a car park, where Mendes seems to be thrown around by an invisible force which represents his emotions.

== Critical reception ==
The New York Times' Jon Caramanica named "Stitches" the 14th best song of the year, writing the "Vine star makes good with low-key slice of handclap pop."

== Chart performance ==
"Stitches" debuted at number 55 on the Billboard Canadian Hot 100 on the chart dated April 4, 2015. It was the most-added song at Canadian contemporary hit radio for the week of June 13, 2015, and debuted at number 50 on the Canada CHR/Top 40 airplay chart for that week. Later, it re-entered the chart at number 40 and eventually peaked at number 10.

In the United States, the song debuted at number 14 on the Billboard Bubbling Under Hot 100 Singles on the chart dated April 25, 2015. It rose to number two on the Bubbling Under chart for the week of June 6, 2015, before debuting on the Billboard Hot 100 proper at number 89 for the chart dated June 13, 2015. On the week ending August 27, 2015, the song entered the top 40 at number 35, climbed seven positions from number 42. The song jumped 12 spots to enter the top 20 at number 20 for the week ending September 10, 2015. The song entered the top 10 at number nine for the chart dated October 17, 2015, and climbed to number eight on the following week. On the week ending October 31, 2015, it entered the top 5 at number four, becoming Mendes' highest-peaking song on the chart at the time until it was surpassed by "Señorita" which reached number-one in August 2019, as well as his first top 5 hit. "Stitches" debuted at number 36 on the Billboard Mainstream Top 40 chart for the week ending June 20, 2015, becoming his first US airplay hit. It has since peaked at number one on the chart, becoming his first number one hit. It was certified 11× Platinum by the Recording Industry Association of America (RIAA) in September 2026 and has sold 2.7 million downloads as of September 2017. The song spent a total of 52 weeks on the Billboard Hot 100 before dropping out on June 11, 2016.

In Sweden, "Stitches" entered the Swedish Singles Chart on the chart dated April 3, 2015, at number 92. It gradually rose up the charts and reached number 58, before dropping out a few weeks later. As it was getting more successful worldwide, "Stitches" re-entered the chart at number 79 on the week ending July 3, 2015. The song peaked at number two on the week ending October 9, 2015, making it the song's best chart performance in any region so far. It has been certified 10× Platinum by the International Federation of the Phonographic Industry of Sweden as of September 9, 2026. In the United Kingdom, "Stitches" debuted at number 98 on the UK Singles Chart in August 2015. Eventually, it entered the top 40 in December of the same year, and on January 22, 2016 – for the week ending date January 28, 2016 – it dethroned Justin Bieber's "Love Yourself" from the top of the chart, finishing just over 1,500 combined chart sales ahead. In Australia, the song debuted at number 48 on the ARIA Singles Chart on the chart dated October 26, 2015. It later peaked at number 4 on the chart dated December 7, 2015. The song was certified 11× Platinum by Australian Recording Industry Association (ARIA).

== Music video ==
A first music video for "Stitches" was directed by Jon Jon Augustavo and premiered on Vevo March 18, 2015, following the song's release to digital retailers. It features the same actress, Ivy Matheson, that appears in his videos for "Never Be Alone" and "Life of the Party" and is the third installment in the Handwritten music video series, but has been later made private.

Mendes eventually announced a new music video for the song on his Instagram account, which was premiered on June 24, 2015. The clip begins with Mendes driving his car into an abandoned parking lot where he gets out and begins singing the song's verses. As he does an invisible force or a ghost is knocking him over in various ways. As the song goes on the force or ghost gets more vicious and slams his head into his car window the force seemed to kick Mendes in the groin and is throwing Mendes through a wall. At the end of the video, Mendes rises his face over a sink to wash of the bruises in front of a mirror. As a child, Mendes would pretend to be attacked by a ghost. As of March 2025, the "Stitches" YouTube video has been viewed over 1.6 billion times.

In July 2015, an acoustic version video duet with Hailee Steinfeld was also released.

== Live performances ==
Mendes appeared on Good Morning America on April 17, 2015, to promote the then-newly released album and performed "Stitches". On April 29, 2015, he performed the song live on both The Ellen DeGeneres Show and on Conan as the episodes' musical guest. On June 21, 2015, he performed the song at the 2015 Much Music Video Awards. Mendes sang "Stitches" again at the 2016 People's Choice Awards, followed by a performance of "I Know What You Did Last Summer" with Camila Cabello. It was also performed on The Jonathan Ross Show. Mendes performed the track on The Voice UK final on April 9, 2016. He has also performed a stripped-down version at the 2016 Billboard Music Awards. His performance was praised by several publications such as Rolling Stone and TIME, with particular praise towards his vocal performance and instrumental skills. In the finals of the Voice Kids in the Philippines, Justin Alva made this the duet song and ended up in third place.

== Remix ==
The song was remixed by Norwegian production duo Seeb. The track was released as "Stitches (Seeb Remix)" on October 16, 2015, on Island Records, a division of UMG Recordings, Inc.

== Charts ==
=== Weekly charts ===
Chart (2015–2016)	Peak position
Australia (ARIA)	4
Austria (Ö3 Austria Top 40)	5
Belgium (Ultratop 50 Flanders)	11
Belgium (Ultratop 50 Wallonia)	10
Brazil (Brasil Hot 100 Airplay)	96
Canada Hot 100 (Billboard)	10
Canada AC (Billboard)	8
Canada CHR/Top 40 (Billboard)	6
Canada Hot AC (Billboard)	6
CIS Airplay (TopHit)	5
Czech Republic Airplay (ČNS IFPI)	8
Czech Republic Singles Digital (ČNS IFPI)	3
Denmark (Tracklisten)	2
Finland (Suomen virallinen lista)	12
France (SNEP)	86
Germany (GfK)	2
Hungary (Rádiós Top 40)	2
Hungary (Single Top 40)	9
Hungary (Stream Top 40)	4
Ireland (IRMA)	2
Italy (FIMI)	2
Luxembourg Digital Sales (Billboard)	4
Mexico (Billboard Mexican Airplay)	18
Mexico Anglo (Monitor Latino)	9
Netherlands (Dutch Top 40)	4
Netherlands (Single Top 100)	5
New Zealand (Recorded Music NZ)	5
Norway (VG-lista)	2
Poland Airplay (ZPAV)	4
Portugal Digital Songs (Billboard)	4
Romania Airplay (Media Forest)	10
Scottish Singles Sales (Official Charts)	1
Slovakia Airplay (ČNS IFPI)	6
Slovakia Singles Digital (ČNS IFPI)	4
Slovenia (SloTop50)	1
Spain (Promusicae)	9
Sweden (Sverigetopplistan)	2
Switzerland (Schweizer Hitparade)	6
UK Singles (Official Charts)	1
US Billboard Hot 100	4
US Adult Contemporary (Billboard)	1
US Adult Pop Airplay (Billboard)	1
US Pop Airplay (Billboard)	1

=== Year-end charts ===
Chart (2015)	Position
Australia (ARIA)	56
Canada (Canadian Hot 100)	27
Hungary (Rádiós Top 40)	73
Hungary (Single Top 40)	89
Italy (FIMI)	80
Netherlands (Dutch Top 40)	54
Netherlands (Single Top 100)	58
Spain (PROMUSICAE)	92
Sweden (Sverigetopplistan)	14
US Billboard Hot 100	36
US Adult Top 40 (Billboard)	47
US Mainstream Top 40 (Billboard)	23

Chart (2016)	Position
Argentina (Monitor Latino)	57
Australia (ARIA)	43
Austria (Ö3 Austria Top 40)	42
Belgium (Ultratop Flanders)	66
Belgium (Ultratop Wallonia)	83
Canada (Canadian Hot 100)	43
CIS (Tophit)	32
Denmark (Tracklisten)	35
France (SNEP)	126
Germany (Official German Charts)	35
Hungary (Rádiós Top 40)	75
Hungary (Single Top 40)	76
Italy (FIMI)	22
Netherlands (Dutch Top 40)	40
Netherlands (Single Top 100)	31
New Zealand (Recorded Music NZ)	47
Russia Airplay (Tophit)	30
Slovenia (SloTop50)	24
Spain (PROMUSICAE)	42
Sweden (Sverigetopplistan)	60
Switzerland (Schweizer Hitparade)	27
UK Singles (OCC)	11
Ukraine Airplay (Tophit)	107
US Billboard Hot 100	23
US Adult Contemporary (Billboard)	1
US Adult Top 40 (Billboard)	8
US Mainstream Top 40 (Billboard)	45

=== Decade-end charts ===
Chart (2010–2019)	Position
UK Singles (OCC)	48

== Certifications ==
Region	Certification	Certified units/sales
Australia (ARIA)	11× Platinum	770,000^{‡}
Austria (IFPI Austria)	2× Platinum	60,000^{‡}
Belgium (BRMA)	Platinum	20,000^{‡}
Brazil (Pro-Música Brasil)	3× Diamond	750,000^{‡}
Canada (Music Canada)	Diamond	800,000^{‡}
Denmark (IFPI Danmark)	5× Platinum	450,000^{‡}
Germany (BVMI)	3× Gold	600,000^{‡}
Italy (FIMI)	5× Platinum	250,000^{‡}
Mexico (AMPROFON)	4× Platinum+Gold	270,000^{‡}
New Zealand (RMNZ)	6× Platinum	180,000^{‡}
Norway (IFPI Norway)	4× Platinum	160,000^{‡}
Poland (ZPAV)	4× Platinum	200,000^{‡}
Portugal (AFP)	2× Platinum	20,000^{‡}
Spain (Promusicae)	3× Platinum	180,000^{‡}
United Kingdom (BPI)	5× Platinum	3,000,000^{‡}
United States (RIAA)	11× Platinum	11,000,000^{‡}
Streaming
Sweden (GLF)	10× Platinum	80,000,000^{†}
^{‡} Sales+streaming figures based on certification alone.^{†} Streaming-only figures based on certification alone.

== See also ==
- List of best-selling singles in Australia
- List of number-one adult contemporary singles of 2016 (U.S.)
