= Something Big (song) =

Single by Shawn Mendes

from the album Handwritten
- Released: November 7, 2014
- Genre: Pop
- Length: 2:41
- Label: Island
- Songwriters: Shawn Mendes; Ido Zmishlany; Scott Harris
- Producer: Ido Zmishlany

Shawn Mendes singles chronology
"Oh Cecilia (Breaking My Heart)" (2014)	"Something Big" (2014)	"Stitches" (2015)

"Something Big" is a pop song by Canadian singer Shawn Mendes from his debut studio album Handwritten (2015). It was released on November 7, 2014, as the lead single from the album. The song peaked at number 80 on the US Billboard Hot 100.

== Music video ==
The music video for "Something Big" was released on November 11, 2014. It was filmed in Bison Run Rd, in Brampton, Ontario.

== Chart performance ==
The song debuted on the Billboard Hot 100 chart of November 22, 2014, at number 92. The song re-entered on chart on January 10, 2015, at number 92, and eventually the song came to number 80 on January 17, 2015.

== Charts ==
=== Weekly charts ===
Chart (2014–2015)	Peak position
Canada (Canadian Hot 100)	11
Canada AC (Billboard)	11
Canada CHR/Top 40 (Billboard)	6
Canada Hot AC (Billboard)	5
Czech Republic (Singles Digitál Top 100)	69
Scotland (OCC)	52
Slovakia (Singles Digitál Top 100)	66
Sweden Heatseeker (Sverigetopplistan)	9
UK Singles (OCC)	109
US Billboard Hot 100	80

=== Year-end charts ===
Chart (2015)	Position
Canada (Canadian Hot 100)	40

== Certifications ==
Region	Certification	Certified units/sales
Australia (ARIA)	Gold	35,000^{‡}
Brazil (Pro-Música Brasil)	Platinum	60,000^{‡}
Canada (Music Canada)	3× Platinum	240,000^{‡}
New Zealand (RMNZ)	Gold	15,000^{‡}
Sweden (GLF)	Gold	20,000^{‡}
United Kingdom (BPI)	Silver	200,000^{‡}
United States (RIAA)	Platinum	1,000,000^{‡}
^{‡} Sales+streaming figures based on certification alone.

== Release history ==
Region	Date	Format	Label
[Worldwide]	November 7, 2014 (Australia)	Digital download	
