= Qobuz =

Online music service

- Developer: Xandrie SA
- Type: Audio streaming
- Launched: 18 September 2007; 18 years ago
- Availability: 26 countries
- Website: qobuz.com

Qobuz (English: /ˈkoʊˌbʌz/, commonly mispronounced /ˈkjuːˌbʌz/; often stylized as qobuz) is a digital music store and music streaming service, launched in France in 2007. The service is owned and operated by Xandrie SA. By June 2023, Qobuz offered over 100 million tracks.

== History ==
Qobuz was founded in 2007 by Alexandre Leforestier and Yves Riesel. The name comes from the musical instrument kobyz/qobyz.

From 2014 to 2020 the company had a partnership with the British classical music magazine Gramophone, under which the magazine used Qobuz to publish recommended playlists.

Qobuz was unable to secure financing, ran into financial difficulties, and in 2015 was acquired by Xandrie SA.

In April 2020, during the early months of the COVID-19 pandemic, Qobuz gave 100% of the revenue from each new subscriber's first paid month back to the rights holders.

In 2020, Qobuz ended its MP3-quality subscription plan, focusing instead on lossless streaming. However, MP3 is available as an option. A family plan was also added. Also that year, in partnership with Quebecor, a Canadian media and telecommunications company, Qobuz launched the music streaming service QUB Music.

In October 2024, Qobuz became available in Japan.

In May 2025, Qobuz launched Qobuz Connect. Announced at the Munich High End show, this feature enables users to stream and control music in all formats (up to 24 bit/192 kHz) on all compatible hi-fi products, using the Qobuz app (mobile or desktop) without the need for a third-party app. Streams are direct from Qobuz servers to the product, and do not pass through the mobile or desktop app. The mobile app can also use a home computer running the desktop Qobuz app as a streaming target.

== Audio formats ==
Streamed music is available in MP3 at 320 kbit/s, CD-DA quality lossless (16-bit/44.1 kHz) and hi-resolution quality lossless (up to 24-bit/192 kHz) for some tracks. The formats available for individually purchased songs are WAV, AIFF, ALAC and FLAC for hi-res quality, lossless WMA for CD quality music, and MP3, standard WMA and AAC for lossy quality (at 128 kbit/s or 320 kbit/s).

In October 2024, Qobuz expanded its audio quality offer by introducing support for the formats DSD (Direct Stream Digital) in 1bit/2.8 MHz, 1bit/5.6 MHz, 1bit/11.2 MHz, 1bit/22.5 MHz, and DXD (Digital eXtreme Definition) up to 24 Bits/352.8 kHz.

== Availability ==
=== Platforms ===
Qobuz has apps for Microsoft Windows, macOS, iOS and Android compatible devices. 30-second clips are available without a subscription.

Qobuz can also be used on Google Chromecast devices and TizenOS (as used on Samsung televisions) devices. It is also available on the music server management service Roon. A web player version (accessed via a web browser) is also available.

=== Hardware ===
The Qobuz app is built into some devices (such as streaming amplifiers) from brands such as Arcam, Cambridge Audio and Naim Audio. In March 2021, Qobuz became the first music platform to offer 24-bit audio streaming on Sonos speakers.

=== Regions ===
At first, Qobuz was only available in France. Qobuz launched in eight European countries in December 2013: the United Kingdom, Ireland, Germany, Austria, Belgium, Switzerland, Luxembourg, and the Netherlands; followed in 2017 by Spain and Italy. In 2019, Qobuz became available in the United States after opening a US headquarters in 2018.

In 2021, Qobuz was made available in six more countries: Sweden, Denmark, Norway, Finland, Australia and New Zealand. Qobuz offered its service in six further countries in 2022: Brazil, Mexico, Argentina, Colombia, Chile, and Portugal, additionally launched in Canada in 2023, and launched in Japan in 2024.

== Business model ==
=== Plans ===
As of 2025, Qobuz has two subscription levels: Studio and Sublime, the latter offering discounts on digital purchases. Both plans are available for one, two or up to six users, and the Studio plan has a lower-priced option for students.

=== Artist royalties ===
Artists are compensated based on their stream share. Qobuz, like other streaming platforms, does not directly pay artists. In line with market practice, about 70% of the revenues generated are paid to rights holders (labels, publishers, distributors, CMO), who in turn pay artists, publishers, composers and authors according to their respective agreements.

=== Funding ===
In August 2019, Qobuz raised €11.7 million from Nabuboto and the Quebecor Group. In September 2020, the two shareholders raised a further 10 million euros.

== See also ==
- Comparison of music streaming services
- Comparison of digital music stores
- List of Internet radio stations
