= Life of the Party (Shawn Mendes song) =

Single by Shawn Mendes

from the EP The Shawn Mendes EP
- Released: June 26, 2014
- Length: 3:35
- Label: Island
- Songwriters: Ido Zmishlany; Scott Harris
- Producer: Ido Zmishlany

Shawn Mendes singles chronology
| "Life of the Party" (2014) | "Oh Cecilia (Breaking My Heart)" (2014) |

Music video
- "Shawn Mendes - Life Of The Party (Official Lyric Video)" on YouTube

"Life of the Party" is the debut single recorded by Canadian singer Shawn Mendes from his extended play The Shawn Mendes EP. Written by Ido Zmishlany and Scott Harris, it was recorded in Toronto, Ontario and released on June 26, 2014. The song was later included on Mendes' debut studio album Handwritten (2015).

== Music video ==
A lyric video, released on July 1, 2014, is a long, one-shot zoom-in on Mendes in The George Street Diner in Toronto, who occasionally converses with the waitress of the diner as he is singing. Lyrics from the song appear in spots such as tables and hanging lights. It ends with the waitress reading a note left from Shawn, smiling as the scene fades. The official video was released on March 11, 2015.

== Background ==
The title of the song, "Life of the Party", may give the impression that it's an upbeat dance song, but in an interview, Mendes described the song as not "super happy, but it's also not depressing". The lyrics represent being happy with yourself and figuring out who you are and who you want to be. It was written by two writers from New York, Ido Zmishlany and Scott Harris, though Mendes felt a strong connection to it.

== Chart performance ==
The song debuted on the Billboard Hot 100 chart of July 12, 2014, at number 24, making it his first entry in the chart and first top 40 hit. Mendes became the youngest artist to debut in the top 25 with a debut song on the Billboard Hot 100 at 15 years, 11 months and 4 days of age. The song debuted at number five on the Hot Digital Songs chart with 148,000 downloads.

== Charts ==
=== Weekly charts ===
| Chart (2014–2015) | Peak position |
|---|---|
| Australia Hitseekers (ARIA) | 9 |
| Belgium (Ultratip Bubbling Under Flanders) | 48 |
| Canada Hot 100 (Billboard) | 9 |
| Canada AC (Billboard) | 9 |
| Canada CHR/Top 40 (Billboard) | 7 |
| Canada Hot AC (Billboard) | 5 |
| Czech Republic Singles Digital (ČNS IFPI) | 44 |
| Ireland (IRMA) | 34 |
| New Zealand (Recorded Music NZ) | 6 |
| Scottish Singles Sales (Official Charts) | 89 |
| Slovakia Singles Digital (ČNS IFPI) | 46 |
| Sweden (Sverigetopplistan) | 37 |
| UK Singles (Official Charts) | 99 |
| US Billboard Hot 100 | 24 |

=== Year-end charts ===
| Chart (2014) | Position |
|---|---|
| Canada (Canadian Hot 100) | 53 |

== Certifications ==
| Region | Certification | Certified units/sales |
|---|---|---|
| Australia (ARIA) | Platinum | 70,000^{‡} |
| Brazil (Pro-Música Brasil) | Platinum | 60,000^{‡} |
| Canada (Music Canada) | 4× Platinum | 320,000^{‡} |
| Denmark (IFPI Danmark) | Gold | 45,000^{‡} |
| New Zealand (RMNZ) | Platinum | 15,000^{*} |
| Norway (IFPI Norway) | Platinum | 10,000^{‡} |
| Sweden (GLF) | Platinum | 40,000^{‡} |
| United Kingdom (BPI) | Silver | 200,000^{‡} |
| United States (RIAA) | 2× Platinum | 2,000,000^{‡} |
^{*} Sales figures based on certification alone.^{‡} Sales+streaming figures based on certification alone.

== Release history ==
Release dates and formats for "Life of the Party"
| Region | Date | Format | Label(s) | Ref. |
|---|---|---|---|---|
| United States | July 29, 2014 | Mainstream airplay | Island; Republic | |
