= List of songs recorded by Shawn Mendes =

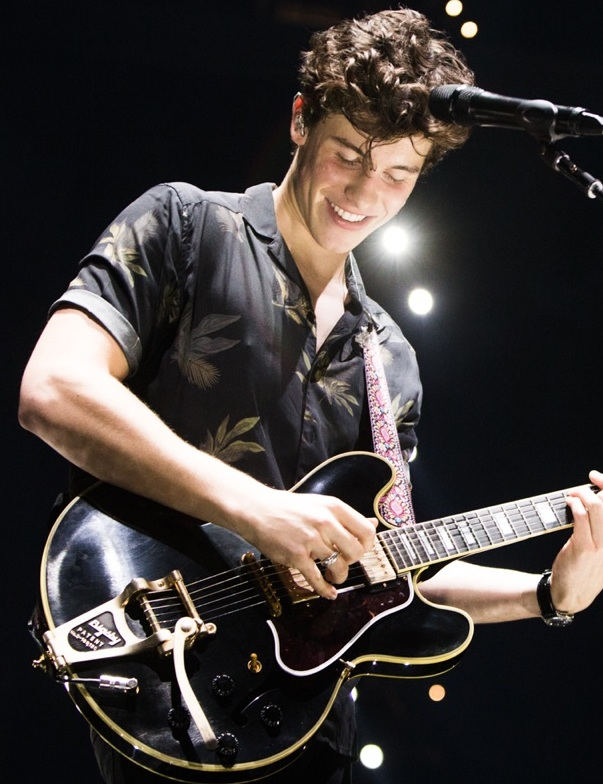
Mendes performing on the Illuminate World Tour at the Oracle Arena, Oakland, California, in July 2017

The Canadian singer-songwriter Shawn Mendes has recorded songs for three studio albums, two extended plays (EP), two live albums and guest features. Mendes signed with Island Records in May 2014. His debut EP, The Shawn Mendes EP, released in July 2014, was preceded by the single "Life of the Party". Mendes' debut studio album Handwritten, released in April 2015, and reissued as Handwritten (Revisited) with live recordings and four new songs in November that year, included the singles "Life of the Party", "Something Big", "Stitches" and "I Know What You Did Last Summer". He collaborated with other artists, including Astrid S and Camila Cabello, to create the pop rock album. Mendes appeared as a featured artist on the Vamps' song "Oh Cecilia (Breaking My Heart)" (2014), and contributed a song called "Believe" to the Descendants soundtrack (2015). He has released two live albums titled, Live at Madison Square Garden (2016), and MTV Unplugged (2017). Both contain live performances of previously released material, along with cover versions of "Hey There Delilah" by Plain White T's and the Jackson 5's "I Want You Back" on the former, and Kings of Leon's "Use Somebody" on the latter.

Mendes' second studio album Illuminate, released in September 2016, included the singles "Treat You Better", "Mercy" and "There's Nothing Holdin' Me Back". Musically, it blends rock, pop and blues, showcasing a more "matured" and "meticulous" side of the singer according to Associated Press' Mesfin Fekadu. His self-titled third studio album was released in May 2018, and included the singles "In My Blood", "Lost in Japan", "Youth", "Where Were You in the Morning?" and "Nervous". During the creation of this album, Mendes was influenced by several genres including rock and R&B. It featured collaborations with Julia Michaels and Khalid. The singles "If I Can't Have You", and the duet with Camila Cabello, "Señorita", were released in May and June 2019 respectively. Both featured on the deluxe edition of his eponymous album. Mendes' fourth studio album, the pop Wonder, which features "big choruses, lush arrangements and momentous fanfares," according to Variety's Jem Aswad, was released in December 2020. It was supported by the singles "Wonder" and "Monster". He released the standalone singles "Summer of Love" and "It'll Be Okay" in 2021, and "When You're Gone" the following year.

== Songs ==
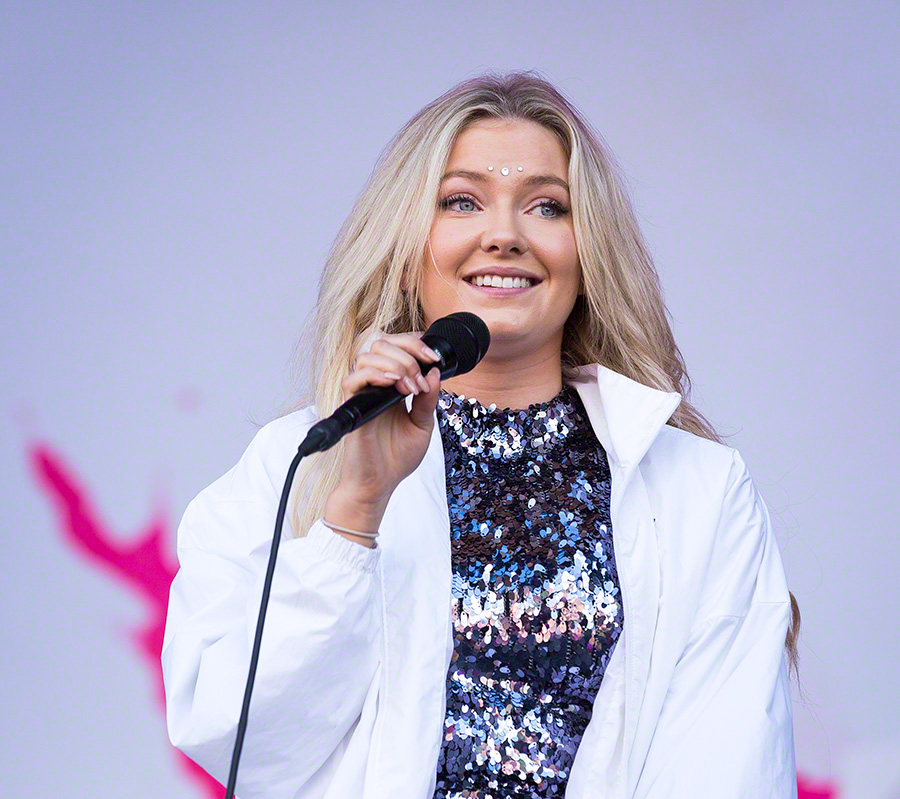
Astrid S is featured on "Air".

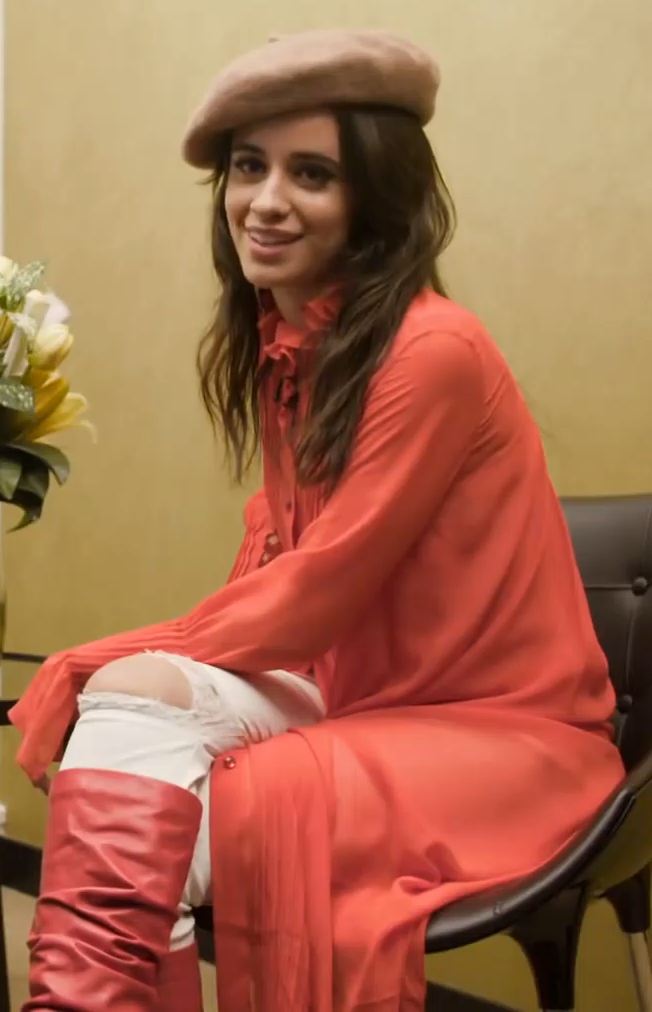
Camila Cabello collaborated with Mendes on "I Know What You Did Last Summer" and "Señorita".

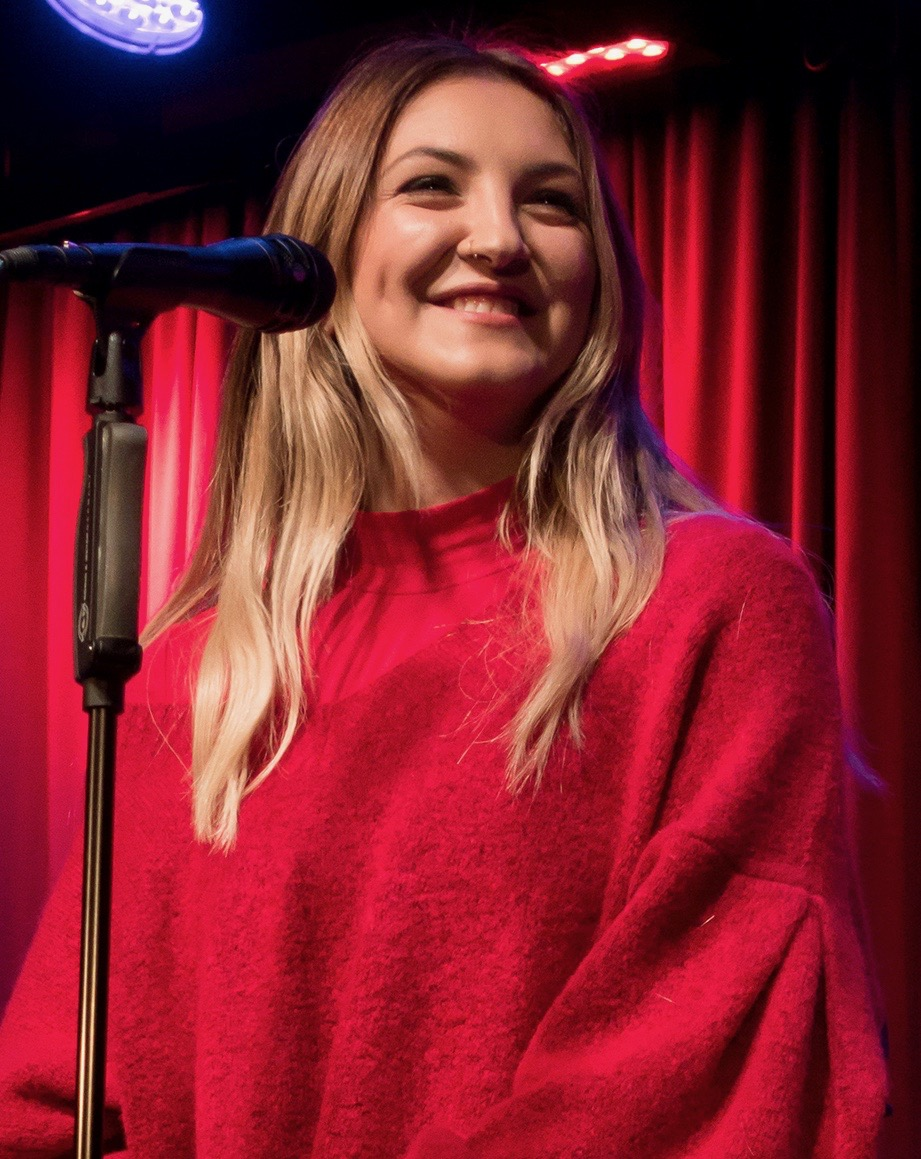
Julia Michaels is featured on "Like to Be You" and co-wrote two songs on Mendes' self-titled third studio album.

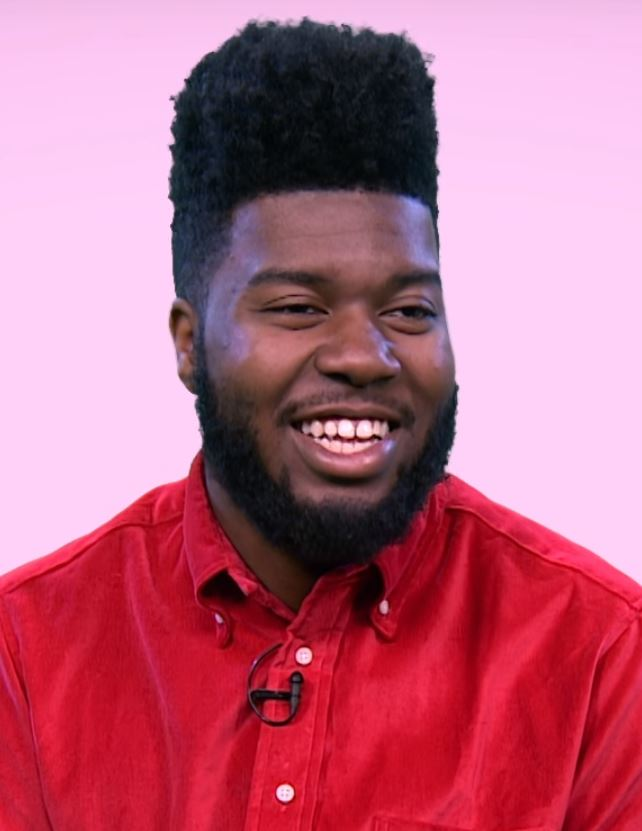
Khalid is featured on "Youth".

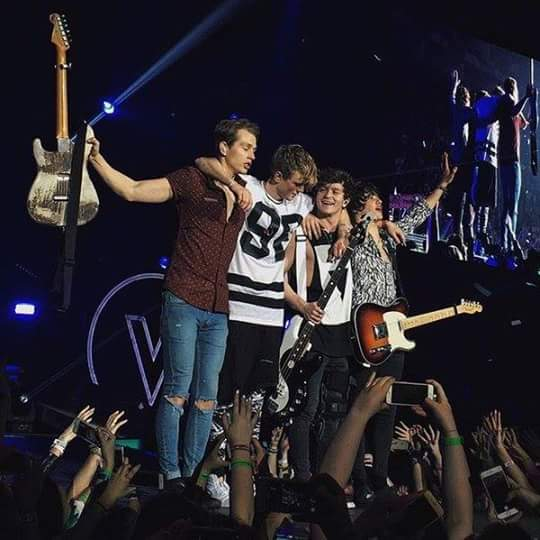
Mendes is featured on The Vamps' song "Oh Cecilia (Breaking My Heart)".

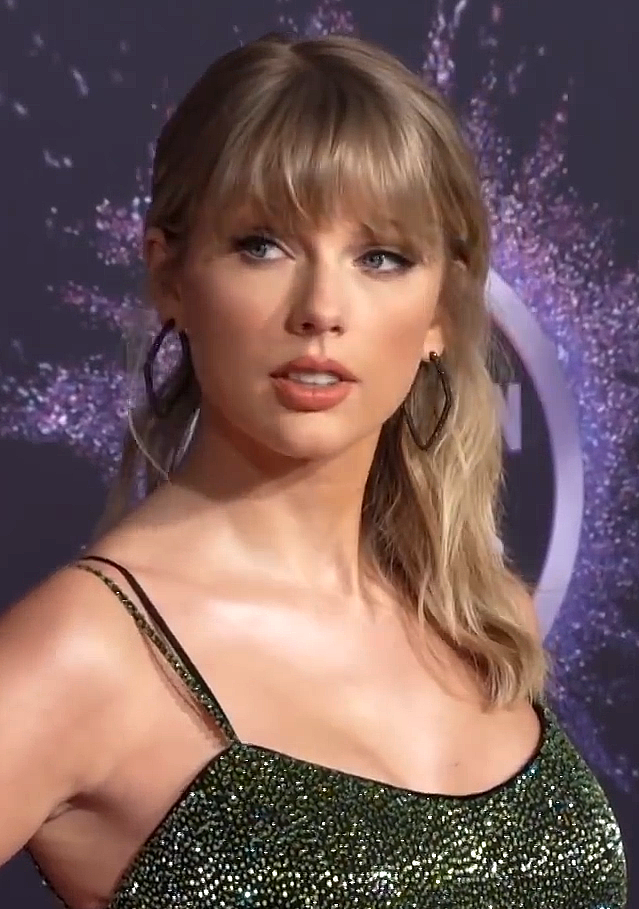
Mendes co-wrote and appears as a featured artist on Taylor Swift's "Lover (Remix)".

Key
‡	Indicates a cover

Name of song, featured performers, writer(s), original release, and year of release
Song	Artist(s)	Writer(s)	Original release	Year	Ref.
"24 Hours"	Shawn Mendes	Shawn Mendes; Scott Harris; Thomas Hull; Nate Mercereau	Wonder	2020	
"305"	Shawn Mendes	Shawn Mendes; Scott Harris; Thomas Hull; Nate Mercereau	Wonder	2020	
"Act Like You Love Me"	Shawn Mendes	Shawn Mendes; Geoffrey Warburton	Handwritten (Revisited)	2015	
"Aftertaste"	Shawn Mendes	Shawn Mendes; Scott Harris; Emily Warren	Handwritten	2015	
"Air"	Shawn Mendes featuring Astrid S	Scott Harris; Emily Warren	Handwritten	2015	
"Always Been You"	Shawn Mendes	Shawn Mendes; Tobias Jesso Jr. Scott Harris; Zubin Thakkar	Wonder	2020	
"Bad Reputation"	Shawn Mendes	Shawn Mendes; Scott Harris; Geoffrey Warburton	Illuminate	2016	
"Because I Had You"	Shawn Mendes	Shawn Mendes; Teddy Geiger; Ryan Tedder; Scott Harris; Zach Skelton	Shawn Mendes	2018	
"Believe"	Shawn Mendes	Shawn Mendes; Geoffrey Warburton; Glen Scott; Martin Terefe	Descendants (Original TV Movie Soundtrack)	2015	
"Bring It Back"	Shawn Mendes	Shawn Mendes; Geoffrey Warburton; Martin Terefe	Handwritten	2015	
"Call My Friends"	Shawn Mendes	Shawn Mendes; Scott Harris; John Ryan II; Thomas Hull; Nate Mercereau	Wonder	2020	
"Can't Imagine"	Shawn Mendes	Shawn Mendes	Wonder	2020	
"Can't Take My Eyes Off You" (BBC Live Version)‡ (Frankie Valli cover)	Shawn Mendes	Bob Crewe; Bob Gaudio	Wonder (Holiday Version)	2020	
"Carried Away"	Shawn Mendes	Benj Pasek; Justin Paul; Arianna Afsar; Mark Sonnenblick	Lyle, Lyle, Crocodile	2022	
"The Christmas Song"	Shawn Mendes and Camila Cabello	Robert Wells; Mel Tormé	Wonder (Holiday Version)	2020	
"Crazy"	Shawn Mendes	Shawn Mendes; Geoffrey Warburton; Martin Terefe	Handwritten	2015	
"Don't Be a Fool"	Shawn Mendes	Shawn Mendes; Scott Harris; Geoffrey Warburton	Illuminate	2016	
"Don't Want Your Love"	Shawn Mendes	Shawn Mendes; Ido Zmishlany; Geoffrey Warburton	Handwritten	2015	
"Dream"	Shawn Mendes	Shawn Mendes; Scott Harris; Thomas Hull; Nate Mercereau	Wonder	2020	
"Fallin' All in You"	Shawn Mendes	Shawn Mendes; Ed Sheeran; Johnny McDaid; Fred Gibson; Scott Harris; Teddy Geiger	Shawn Mendes	2018	
"Handwritten Demos"	Shawn Mendes	— (Note: "Handwritten Demos" is a nine-minute compilation of demos of various different songs and does not have any credited songwriters.)	Handwritten	2015	
"Heartbeat"	Shawn Mendes	Amy Allen; Clyde Lawrence; Jason Cornet; Jon Bellion; Jordan Cohen; Scott Harris	Lyle, Lyle, Crocodile	2022	
"Hey There Delilah" ‡ (Plain White T's cover)	Shawn Mendes	Tom Higgenson	Live at Madison Square Garden	2016	
"Higher"	Shawn Mendes	Shawn Mendes; Scott Harris	Wonder	2020	
"Hold On"	Shawn Mendes	Shawn Mendes; Scott Harris; Geoffrey Warburton	Illuminate	2016	
"Honest"	Shawn Mendes	Shawn Mendes; Scott Harris; Geoffrey Warburton	Illuminate	2016	
"I Don't Even Know Your Name"	Shawn Mendes	Shawn Mendes; Scott Harris; Martin Terefe; Geoffrey Warburton	Handwritten	2015	
"I Know What You Did Last Summer"	Shawn Mendes and Camila Cabello	Camila Cabello; Shawn Mendes; Ido Zmishlany; Noel Zancanella; Bill Withers	Handwritten; Handwritten (Revisited)	2015	
"I Want You Back" ‡ (The Jackson 5 cover)	Shawn Mendes	Berry Gordy; Freddie Perren; Alphonso Mizell; Deke Richards	Live at Madison Square Garden	2016	
"If I Can't Have You"	Shawn Mendes	Shawn Mendes; Teddy Geiger; Scott Harris; Nate Mercereau	Shawn Mendes (Deluxe)	2019	
"Imagination"	Shawn Mendes	Shawn Mendes; Martin Terefe; Scott Harris	Handwritten	2015	
"In My Blood"	Shawn Mendes	Shawn Mendes; Teddy Geiger; Scott Harris; Geoffrey Warburton	Shawn Mendes	2018	
"Intro"	Shawn Mendes	Shawn Mendes; Adam Feeney; Scott Harris; Tobias Jesso, Jr.	Wonder	2020	
"It'll Be Okay"	Shawn Mendes	Shawn Mendes; Scott Harris; Mike Sabath; Eddie Benjamin	Non-Album Single	2021	
"Kesi (Remix)"	Camilo and Shawn Mendes	Camilo Echeverry; Juan Morelli; Scott Harris	Non-Album Single	2021	
"Kid in Love"	Shawn Mendes	Shawn Mendes; Ido Zmishlany; Scott Harris	Handwritten	2015	
"Life of the Party"	Shawn Mendes	Ido Zmishlany; Scott Harris	Handwritten	2014	
"Lights On"	Shawn Mendes	Shawn Mendes; Scott Harris; Geoffrey Warburton	Illuminate	2016	
"Like This"	Shawn Mendes	Shawn Mendes; Laleh Pourkarim; Gustaf Thörn	Illuminate	2016	
"Like to Be You"	Shawn Mendes featuring Julia Michaels	Shawn Mendes; Julia Michaels; Scott Harris	Shawn Mendes	2018	
"A Little Too Much"	Shawn Mendes	Shawn Mendes	Handwritten	2015	
"Look Up at the Stars"	Shawn Mendes	Shawn Mendes; Scott Harris; Thomas Hull	Wonder	2020	
"Lost"	Shawn Mendes	Shawn Mendes; Emily Warren; Scott Harris; Joshua Grant	Handwritten	2015	
"Lost in Japan"	Shawn Mendes	Shawn Mendes; Teddy Geiger; Scott Harris; Nathaniel Mercereau	Shawn Mendes	2018	
"Lover (remix)"	Taylor Swift featuring Shawn Mendes	Taylor Swift; Shawn Mendes; Scott Harris	None	2019	
"Memories"	Shawn Mendes	Shawn Mendes; Geoffrey Warburton; Max River	Handwritten (Revisited)	2015	
"Mercy"	Shawn Mendes	Shawn Mendes; Teddy Geiger; Danny Parker; Ilsey Juber	Illuminate	2016	
"Monster"	Shawn Mendes and Justin Bieber	Shawn Mendes; Justin Bieber; Adam Fenney; Ashton Simmonds; Mustafa Ahmed	Wonder	2020	
"Mutual"	Shawn Mendes	Shawn Mendes; Teddy Geiger; Geoffrey Warburton; Scott Harris; Ian Kirkpatrick	Shawn Mendes	2018	
"Nervous"	Shawn Mendes	Shawn Mendes; Scott Harris; Julia Michaels	Shawn Mendes	2018	
"Never Be Alone"	Shawn Mendes	Shawn Mendes; Scott Harris; Martin Terefe; Glen Scott	Handwritten	2015	
"No Promises"	Shawn Mendes	Shawn Mendes; Scott Harris; Teddy Geiger	Illuminate	2016	
"Oh Cecilia (Breaking My Heart)" (Note: "Oh Cecilia (Breaking My Heart)" is an adaptation of Simon & Garfunkel's song "Cecilia".)	The Vamps featuring Shawn Mendes	Paul Simon; Connor Ball; Tristan Evans; James McVey; Brad Simpson	Meet the Vamps	2014	
"One of Those Nights"	Shawn Mendes	Scott Harris; Shawn Mendes; Ido Zmishlany	The Shawn Mendes EP	2014	
"Particular Taste"	Shawn Mendes	Shawn Mendes; Ryan Tedder; Zach Skelton	Shawn Mendes	2018	
"Patience"	Shawn Mendes	Shawn Mendes; Scott Harris; Teddy Geiger	Illuminate	2016	
"Perfectly Wrong"	Shawn Mendes	Shawn Mendes; Teddy Geiger; Scott Harris; Geoffrey Warburton	Shawn Mendes	2018	
"Pieces of You"	Shawn Mendes	Shawn Mendes; Scott Harris; John Ryan II; Eric Frederic	Wonder	2020	
"Queen"	Shawn Mendes	Shawn Mendes; Teddy Geiger; Scott Harris; Geoffrey Warburton	Shawn Mendes	2018	
"Rip Up the Recipe"	Shawn Mendes and Constance Wu	Benj Pasek; Justin Paul; Emily Gardner Xu Hall; Mark Sonnenblick	Lyle, Lyle, Crocodile	2022	
"Roses"	Shawn Mendes	Shawn Mendes; Tobias Jesso Jr. Tom Hull	Illuminate	2016	
"Ruin"	Shawn Mendes	Shawn Mendes; Ido Zmishlany; Scott Harris; Geoffrey Warburton; Zubin Thakkar	Illuminate	2016	
"Running Low"	Shawn Mendes	Shawn Mendes	Handwritten (Revisited)	2015	
"Señorita"	Shawn Mendes and Camila Cabello	Shawn Mendes; Camila Cabello; Andrew Wotman; Benjamin Levin; Ali Tamposi; Charlotte Emma Aitchison; Jack Patterson; Magnus August Høiberg	Shawn Mendes (Deluxe)	2019	
"Show You"	Shawn Mendes	Scott Harris; Shawn Mendes; Martin Terefe; Ido Zmishlany	The Shawn Mendes EP	2014	
"Something Big"	Shawn Mendes	Shawn Mendes; Ido Zmishlany; Scott Harris	Handwritten	2015	
"Song for No One"	Shawn Mendes	Shawn Mendes; Scott Harris; Nate Mercereau; Adam Fenney	Wonder	2020	
"Stitches"	Shawn Mendes	Daniel Parker; Teddy Geiger; Daniel "Daylight" Kyriakides	Handwritten	2015	
"Strings"	Shawn Mendes	Shawn Mendes; Scott Harris; Emily Warren	Handwritten	2015	
"Summer of Love"	Shawn Mendes & Tainy	Shawn Mendes; Marco Masís; Alejandro Borrero; Ivanni Rodríguez; Ido Zmishlany; Scott Harris; Sarah Solovay; Gregory Hein; Randy Class; Andrew Jackson	Non-album singles	2021	
"Take a Look at Us Now (Lyle reprise)"	Shawn Mendes	Benj Pasek; Justin Paul	Lyle, Lyle, Crocodile	2022	
"Take a Look at Us Now (Reprise)"	Javier Bardem and Shawn Mendes	Pasek; Paul	Lyle, Lyle, Crocodile	2022	
"Take a Look at Us Now (Finale)"	Shawn Mendes and Winslow Fegley, and Lyle, Lyle, Crocodile ensemble	Benj Pasek; Justin Paul	Lyle, Lyle, Crocodile	2022	
"Teach Me How to Love"	Shawn Mendes	Shawn Mendes; Scott Harris; Thomas Hull; Nate Mercereau	Wonder	2020	
"There's Nothing Holdin' Me Back"	Shawn Mendes	Shawn Mendes; Teddy Geiger; Scott Harris; Geoffrey Warburton	Illuminate	2016	
"This Is What It Takes"	Shawn Mendes	Shawn Mendes; Geoffrey Warburton; Martin Terefe; Ido Zmishlany; Scott Harris	Handwritten	2015	
"Three Empty Words"	Shawn Mendes	Shawn Mendes; Scott Harris; Ido Zmishlany; Geoffrey Warburton	Illuminate	2016	
"Top of the World"	Shawn Mendes	Benj Pasek; Justin Paul; Joriah Kwamé	Lyle, Lyle, Crocodile	2022	
"Treat You Better"	Shawn Mendes	Shawn Mendes; Teddy Geiger; Scott Harris	Illuminate	2016	
"Under Pressure" ‡ (Queen and David Bowie cover)	Shawn Mendes featuring teddy<3	Roger Taylor; Freddie Mercury; David Bowie; John Deacon; Brian May	Non-album single	2018	
"Understand"	Shawn Mendes	Shawn Mendes; Scott Harris; Teddy Geiger; Geoffrey Warburton	Illuminate	2016	
"Use Somebody" ‡ (Kings of Leon cover)	Shawn Mendes	Caleb Followill; Nathan Followill; Jared Followill; Matthew Followill	MTV Unplugged	2017	
"The Weight"	Shawn Mendes	Shawn Mendes; Scott Harris; Joshua Grant	Handwritten	2015	
"When You're Ready"	Shawn Mendes	Shawn Mendes; Scott Harris; Amy Allen; Geoffrey Warburton; Teddy Geiger	Shawn Mendes	2018	
"Where Were You in the Morning?"	Shawn Mendes	Shawn Mendes; Teddy Geiger; Scott Harris; Geoffrey Warburton	Shawn Mendes	2018	
"Why"	Shawn Mendes	Shawn Mendes; Teddy Geiger; Scott Harris	Shawn Mendes	2018	
"Wonder"	Shawn Mendes	Shawn Mendes; Scott Harris; Thomas Hull; Nate Mercereau	Wonder	2020	
"Youth"	Shawn Mendes featuring Khalid	Shawn Mendes; Khalid Robinson; Scott Harris; Geoffrey Warburton; Teddy Geiger	Shawn Mendes	2018	
"When You're Gone"	Shawn Mendes	Shawn Mendes; Scott Harris; Jonah Shy	Non-album single	2022	
