= MTV Unplugged (Shawn Mendes album) =

Live album by Shawn Mendes
- Released: November 3, 2017
- Recorded: September 2017; Ace Hotel, Los Angeles
- Genre: Pop rock
- Length: 50:41
- Label: Island; Universal

Shawn Mendes chronology
Live at Madison Square Garden (2016)	MTV Unplugged (2017)	Shawn Mendes (2018)

MTV Unplugged is the second live album by Canadian singer-songwriter Shawn Mendes. The album was recorded at The Theatre at Ace Hotel, Los Angeles in September 2017. The album was released worldwide on November 3, 2017.

== Commercial performance ==
MTV Unplugged debuted at number 71 in the United States with 9,000 units; 3,000 of which were traditional album sales.

== Track listing ==
No.	Title	Writer(s)	Length
1.	"There's Nothing Holdin' Me Back"	Shawn Mendes; Teddy Geiger; Geoff Warburton; Scott Harris	3:30
2.	"Ruin"	Harris; Mendes; Zubin Thakkar; Warburton; Zmishlany	6:21
3.	"Stitches"	Geiger; Daniel Kyriakides; Parker	4:23
4.	"Three Empty Words"	Harris; Mendes; Warburton; Zmishlany	4:19
5.	"Patience"	Mendes; Harris; Geiger	3:15
6.	"Bad Reputation"	Harris; Mendes; Warburton	5:11
7.	"Don't Be a Fool"	Harris; Mendes; Warburton	5:37
8.	"Roses"	Mendes; Tobias Jesso Jr.; Tom Hull	4:14
9.	"Mercy"	Geiger; Ilsey Juber; Mendes; Daniel Parker	3:48
10.	"Never Be Alone"	Mendes; Harris; Martin Terefe; Glen Scott	4:49
11.	"Use Somebody / Treat You Better"	Caleb Followill; Nathan Followill; Jared Followill; Matthew Followill; Mendes; Harris; Geiger	5:16

== Personnel ==
Credits adapted from the album's liner notes.

Musicians

- Wynton Grant – violin (tracks 6, 9, 10)
- Dave Haskett – bass (tracks 1, 2, 6–9, 11)
- Patrick Laird – cello (tracks 6, 9–11)
- Shawn Mendes – vocals (all tracks), acoustic guitar (tracks 1, 2, 4–6), electric guitar (tracks 7, 10, 11), piano (track 3)
- Cicely Parnas – cello (tracks 6, 9, 10)
- Eddy Ruyter – piano (tracks 1, 5–9, 11), keyboards (track 2)
- Mike Sleath – drums (tracks 1, 2, 5, 6, 9, 11)
- Zubin Thakkar – guitar (all tracks)
- Geoff Warburton – electric guitar (track 1), acoustic guitar (track 2)

Production

- J. Mark King – engineer (tracks 1–3, 5–11)
- Cody Robertson – assistant mixing
- George Seara – mixing
- Zubin Thakkar – producer, engineer (track 4)

== Charts ==
Chart (2017)	Peak position
Austrian Albums (Ö3 Austria)	40
Belgian Albums (Ultratop Flanders)	51
Belgian Albums (Ultratop Wallonia)	197
Canadian Albums (Billboard)	35
Dutch Albums (Album Top 100)	65
German Albums (Offizielle Top 100)	59
Norwegian Albums (VG-lista)	16
Portuguese Albums (AFP)	38
Spanish Albums (PROMUSICAE)	35
Swiss Albums (Schweizer Hitparade)	38
US Billboard 200	71

== Release history ==
Region	Date	Format(s)	Label	Catalogue	Ref
Various	November 3, 2017	Digital download, CD, vinyl	Island Records; Universal Music Group	060256708929	
