= Live at Madison Square Garden (Shawn Mendes album) =

Live album by Shawn Mendes
- Released: December 23, 2016
- Recorded: Madison Square Garden; September 10, 2016
- Genre: Pop rock
- Length: 62:33
- Label: Island; Universal

Shawn Mendes chronology
Illuminate (2016)	Live at Madison Square Garden (2016)	MTV Unplugged (2017)

Live at Madison Square Garden is the first live album by Canadian singer-songwriter Shawn Mendes. The album features the hit singles "Mercy", "Treat You Better", Stitches" and "Life of the Party" alongside special medleys of other songs. The album was released worldwide, digitally on December 19, 2016.

== Background and release ==
On 10 September 2016, Mendes recorded his one-night-only Madison Square Garden show which was a part of his Shawn Mendes World Tour which took place across North America and Europe throughout 2016. The album serves to document the singer-songwriter's first-time ever headlining the historic New York City venue. The album was announced on 19 December 2016 and released 4 days later.

Following the performance Mendes' second album, Illuminate, debuted at No. 1 on the Billboard 200 chart in September. He headlined Radio City Music Hall and performed on Saturday Night Live in December 2016.

== Critical reception ==
Professional ratings
Review scores
Source	Rating
AllMusic	3/5 stars

Stephen Thomas Erlewine from AllMusic said; "Live at Madison Square Garden is a digital-only document of Shawn Mendes' September 10, 2016 concert in New York City... The crowd was primed for Mendes, who delivered earnest renditions of his hits, a couple of medleys, and teasers from the new record (Illuminate). If the record isn't especially kinetic, it's nevertheless sincere and Mendes relies on the same increasing sense of craft that made his second record stronger than his debut, which helps make this a nice little souvenir for fans."

== Track listing ==
Live at Madison Square Garden
No.	Title	Writer(s)	Length
1.	"The Weight"	Shawn Mendes; Scott Harris; Josh Grant	3:56
2.	"Treat You Better"	Mendes; Harris; Teddy Geiger	4:17
3.	"Lights On"	Mendes; Harris; Geoffrey Warburton	4:32
4.	"I Don't Even Know Your Name / Aftertaste / Kid in Love / I Want You Back"	Mendes; Harris; Warburton; Emily Warren; Berry Gordy, Jr.; Freddie Perren; Alphonso Mizell; Deke Richards	7:16
5.	"Bad Reputation"	Mendes; Harris; Warburton	5:12
6.	"Ruin"	Mendes; Zimishlany; Harris; Warburton; Zubin Thakkar	7:53
7.	"Life of the Party"	Mendes; Harris	3:19
8.	"Three Empty Words"	Mendes; Harris; Warburton; Zmishlany	4:05
9.	"Don't Be a Fool"	Mendes; Harris; Warburton	4:51
10.	"Mercy"	Mendes; Geiger; Daniel Parker; Ilsey Juber	4:23
11.	"Never Be Alone / Hey There Delilah"	Mendes; Harris; Tom Higgenson; Glen Scott; Terefe	6:12
12.	"Stitches"	Mendes; Geiger	6:37

== Charts ==
Chart (2017)	Peak position
Belgian Albums (Ultratop Flanders)	99
Dutch Albums (Album Top 100)	67
US Billboard 200	200

== Release history ==
Region	Date	Format(s)	Label	Ref
Worldwide	December 23, 2016	Digital download	Island Records; Universal Music Group	
