= List of Canadian Hot 100 number-one singles of 2016 =

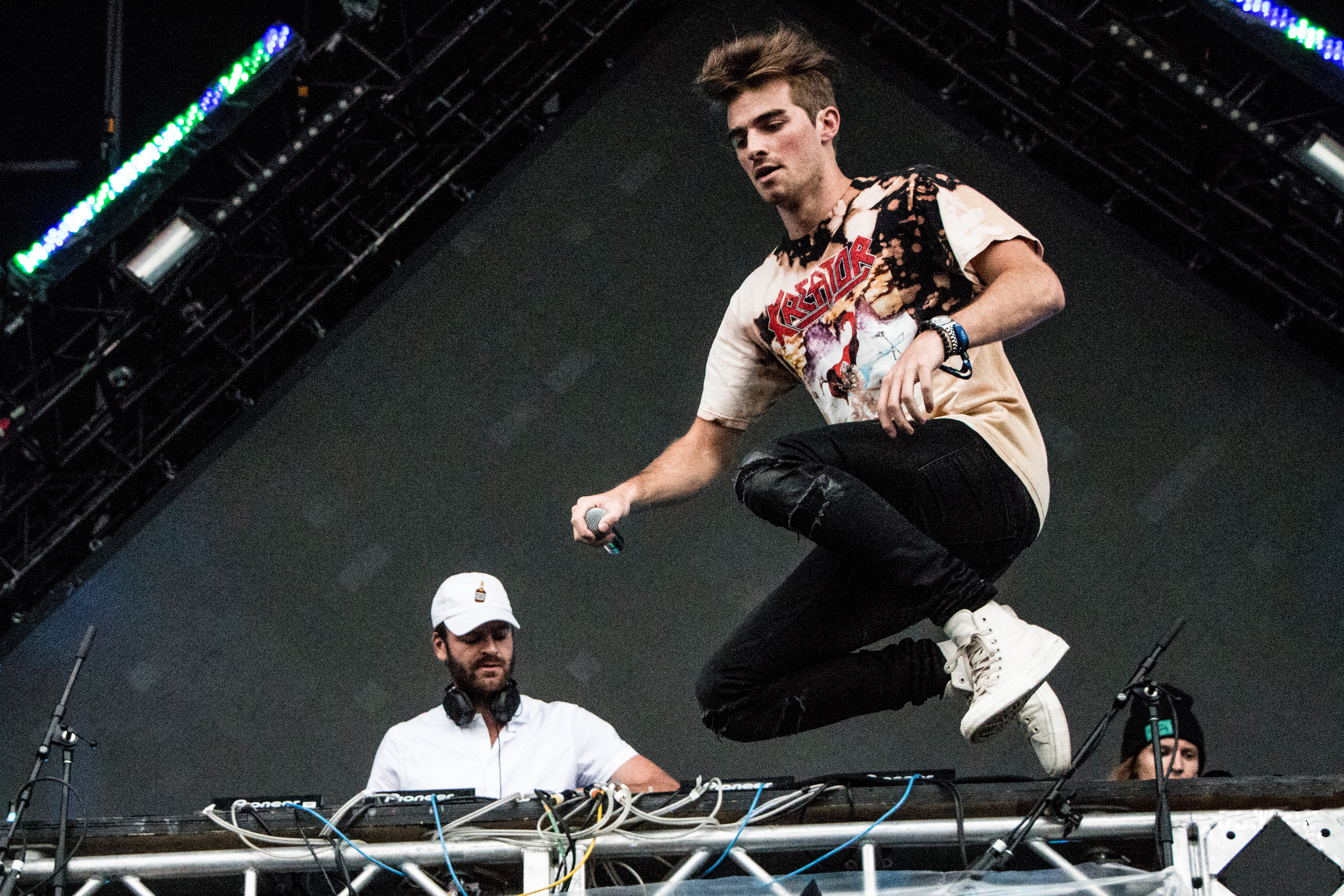
"Closer" by The Chainsmokers (pictured) featuring Halsey spent thirteen weeks at number one, becoming the longest-running number-one single of the year.

This is a list of the Canadian Hot 100 number-one singles of 2016. The Canadian Hot 100 is a chart that ranks the best-performing singles of Canada. Its data, published by Billboard magazine and compiled by Nielsen SoundScan, is based collectively on each single's weekly physical and digital sales, as well as airplay and streaming.

Note that Billboard publishes charts with an issue date approximately 10–11 days in advance.

== Chart history ==
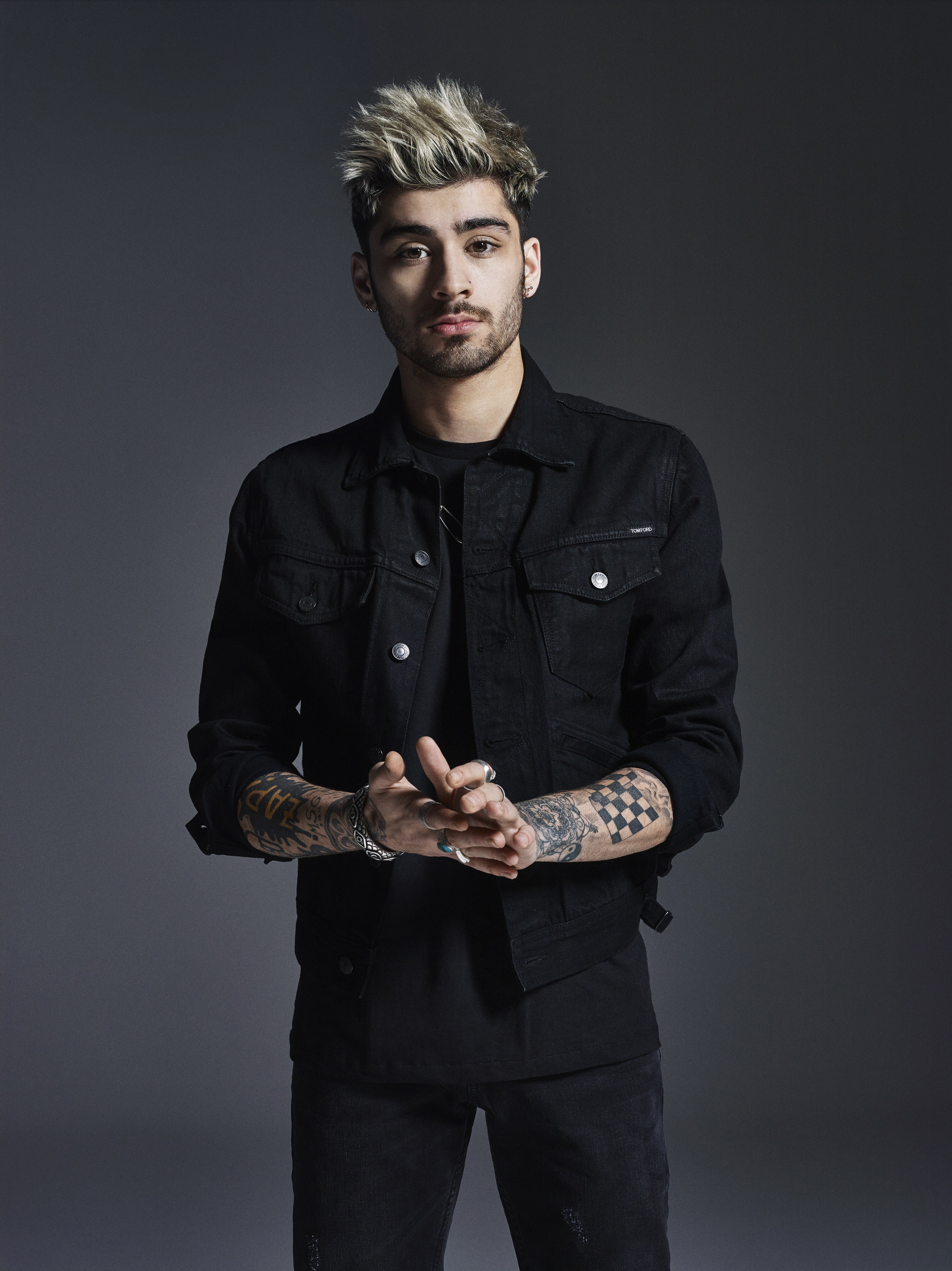
Zayn (pictured)'s "Pillowtalk" debuted at number one, becoming the sixteenth song to do so.

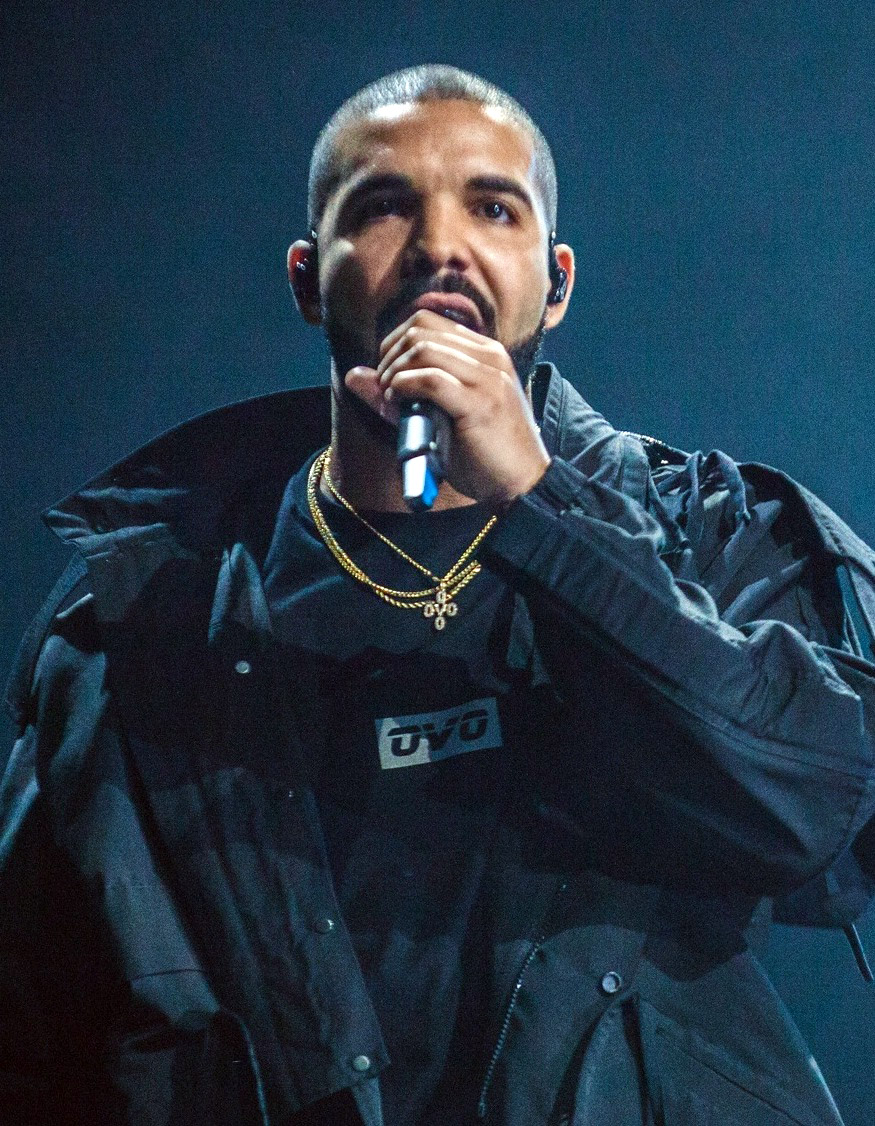
Canadian singer Drake (pictured) earned his first and second number-one singles with "Work" and "One Dance".

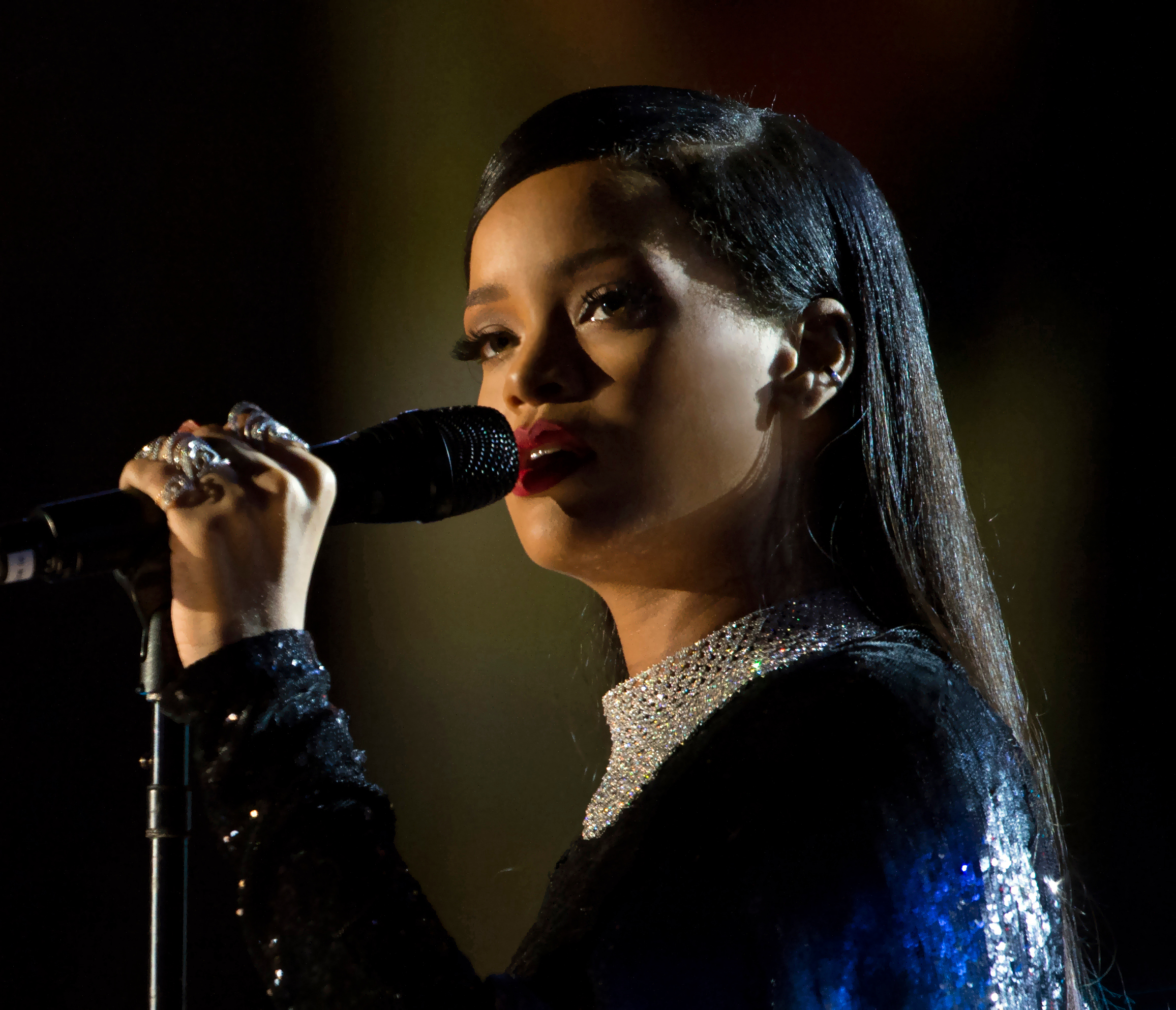
With "Work" and "This Is What You Came For", Rihanna (pictured) earned her tenth and eleventh number-one singles on the chart, making her the act with the most Canadian Hot 100 number-one singles.

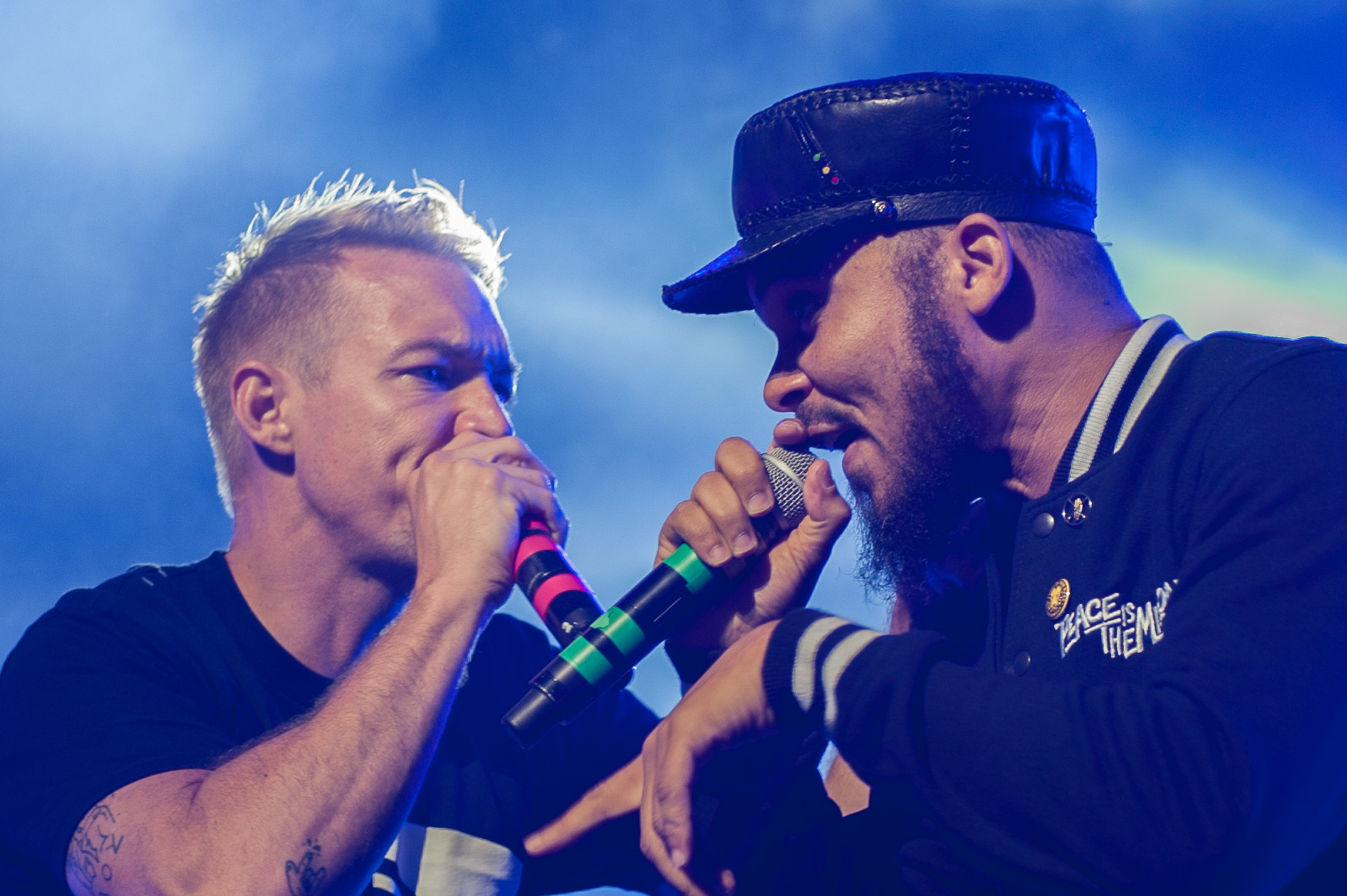
"Cold Water" by Major Lazer featuring Justin Bieber and MØ debuted at number one, becoming the seventeenth song to do so. (photo: Diplo and Walshy Fire, two members of Major Lazer).

Key
†	Indicates best-performing single of 2016

No.	Issue date	Song	Artist(s)	Ref.
104	January 2	"Sorry" †	Justin Bieber	
104	January 9	"Sorry" †	Justin Bieber	
104	January 16	"Sorry" †	Justin Bieber	
104	January 23	"Sorry" †	Justin Bieber	
104	January 30	"Sorry" †	Justin Bieber	
104	February 6	"Sorry" †	Justin Bieber	
104	February 13	"Sorry" †	Justin Bieber	
105	February 20	"Pillowtalk"	Zayn	
106	February 27	"Love Yourself"	Justin Bieber	
106	March 5	"Love Yourself"	Justin Bieber	
107	March 12	"Work"	Rihanna featuring Drake	
107	March 19	"Work"	Rihanna featuring Drake	
107	March 26	"Work"	Rihanna featuring Drake	
107	April 2	"Work"	Rihanna featuring Drake	
108	April 9	"7 Years"	Lukas Graham	
108	April 16	"7 Years"	Lukas Graham	
108	April 23	"7 Years"	Lukas Graham	
108	April 30	"7 Years"	Lukas Graham	
109	May 7	"One Dance"	Drake featuring Wizkid and Kyla	
109	May 14	"One Dance"	Drake featuring Wizkid and Kyla	
109	May 21	"One Dance"	Drake featuring Wizkid and Kyla	
109	May 28	"One Dance"	Drake featuring Wizkid and Kyla	
109	June 4	"One Dance"	Drake featuring Wizkid and Kyla	
109	June 11	"One Dance"	Drake featuring Wizkid and Kyla	
109	June 18	"One Dance"	Drake featuring Wizkid and Kyla	
110	June 25	"Can't Stop the Feeling!"	Justin Timberlake	
111	July 2	"Cheap Thrills"	Sia featuring Sean Paul	
111	July 9	"Cheap Thrills"	Sia featuring Sean Paul	
111	July 16	"Cheap Thrills"	Sia featuring Sean Paul	
112	July 23	"This Is What You Came For"	Calvin Harris featuring Rihanna	
112	July 30	"This Is What You Came For"	Calvin Harris featuring Rihanna	
112	August 6	"This Is What You Came For"	Calvin Harris featuring Rihanna	
113	August 13	"Cold Water"	Major Lazer featuring Justin Bieber and MØ	
re	August 20	"Cheap Thrills"	Sia featuring Sean Paul	
re	August 27	"Cold Water"	Major Lazer featuring Justin Bieber and MØ	
re	September 3	"Cold Water"	Major Lazer featuring Justin Bieber and MØ	
114	September 10	"Closer"	The Chainsmokers featuring Halsey	
114	September 17	"Closer"	The Chainsmokers featuring Halsey	
114	September 24	"Closer"	The Chainsmokers featuring Halsey	
114	October 1	"Closer"	The Chainsmokers featuring Halsey	
114	October 8	"Closer"	The Chainsmokers featuring Halsey	
114	October 15	"Closer"	The Chainsmokers featuring Halsey	
114	October 22	"Closer"	The Chainsmokers featuring Halsey	
114	October 29	"Closer"	The Chainsmokers featuring Halsey	
114	November 5	"Closer"	The Chainsmokers featuring Halsey	
114	November 12	"Closer"	The Chainsmokers featuring Halsey	
114	November 19	"Closer"	The Chainsmokers featuring Halsey	
114	November 26	"Closer"	The Chainsmokers featuring Halsey	
114	December 3	"Closer"	The Chainsmokers featuring Halsey	
115	December 10	"Starboy"	The Weeknd featuring Daft Punk	
115	December 17	"Starboy"	The Weeknd featuring Daft Punk	
115	December 24	"Starboy"	The Weeknd featuring Daft Punk	
115	December 31	"Starboy"	The Weeknd featuring Daft Punk	

== See also ==
- List of number-one albums of 2016 (Canada)
