= List of number-one hits of 2016 (Austria) =

This is a list of the Austrian number-one singles and albums of 2016 as compiled by Ö3 Austria Top 40, the official chart provider of Austria.

Issue date	Song	Artist	Album	Artist
1 January	No Top 40 released			
8 January	"Ham kummst"	Seiler und Speer	Weihnachten	Helene Fischer & The Royal Philharmonic Orchestra
15 January	"7 Years"	Lukas Graham	Ham kummst	Seiler und Speer
22 January	"7 Years"	Lukas Graham	Neujahrskonzert 2016 - New Year's Concert	Mariss Jansons / Vienna Philharmonic
29 January	"7 Years"	Lukas Graham	Blackstar	David Bowie
5 February	"Faded"	Alan Walker	Ham kummst	Seiler und Speer
12 February	"Faded"	Alan Walker	Ham kummst	Seiler und Speer
19 February	"Faded"	Alan Walker	Ham kummst	Seiler und Speer
26 February	"Faded"	Alan Walker	Ham kummst	Seiler und Speer
4 March	"Faded"	Alan Walker	Freudensprünge	Fantasy
11 March	"Faded"	Alan Walker	Freudensprünge	Fantasy
18 March	"Faded"	Alan Walker	Ham kummst	Seiler und Speer
25 March	"Faded"	Alan Walker	Violetta - En gira	Soundtrack
1 April	"Faded"	Alan Walker	Alles Nix Konkretes	AnnenMayKantereit
8 April	"Faded"	Alan Walker	Jomsviking	Amon Amarth
15 April	"Faded"	Alan Walker	Nicht von dieser Welt 2	Xavier Naidoo
22 April	"Faded"	Alan Walker	Seelenbeben	Andrea Berg
29 April	"Cheap Thrills"	Sia	Wonach sieht's denn aus?	Nockalm Quintett
6 May	"Cheap Thrills"	Sia	Seite an Seite	Christina Stürmer
13 May	"Cheap Thrills"	Sia	20 Jahre - nur das Beste!	Seer
20 May	"Cheap Thrills"	Sia	Seelenbeben	Andrea Berg
27 May	"The Sound of Silence"	Disturbed	Irreversibel	Nazar
3 June	"The Sound of Silence"	Disturbed	Fallen Angels	Bob Dylan
10 June	"The Sound of Silence"	Disturbed	Blut	Farid Bang
17 June	"The Sound of Silence"	Disturbed	Seal the Deal & Let's Boogie	Volbeat
24 June	"The Sound of Silence"	Disturbed	Seal the Deal & Let's Boogie	Volbeat
1 July	"The Sound of Silence"	Disturbed	The Getaway	Red Hot Chili Peppers
8 July	"The Sound of Silence"	Disturbed	Seal the Deal & Let's Boogie	Volbeat
15 July	"Don't Be So Shy" (Filatov & Karas Remix)"	Imany	Schiff ahoi	Calimeros
22 July	"Don't Be So Shy" (Filatov & Karas Remix)"	Imany	Da oben #16	Nik P.
29 July	"Don't Be So Shy" (Filatov & Karas Remix)"	Imany	Da oben #16	Nik P.
5 August	"Don't Be So Shy" (Filatov & Karas Remix)"	Imany	Wie ein Feuerwerk	Die Amigos
12 August	"Don't Be So Shy" (Filatov & Karas Remix)"	Imany	Afraid of Heights	Billy Talent
19 August	"Don't Be So Shy" (Filatov & Karas Remix)"	Imany	Wie ein Feuerwerk	Die Amigos
26 August	"Don't Be So Shy" (Filatov & Karas Remix)"	Imany	Der Holland Job	Coup
2 September	"Cold Water"	Major Lazer featuring Justin Bieber and MØ	#Zwilling	Die Lochis
9 September	"Don't Be So Shy" (Filatov & Karas Remix)	Imany	Advanced Chemistry	Beginner
16 September	"Das Geschenk"	Sportfreunde Stiller	Vibe	Fler
23 September	"Jedermann"	Pizzera & Jaus	Strassenmusikant	Dame
30 September	"Jedermann"	Pizzera & Jaus	Die Sonne scheint für alle	Kastelruther Spatzen
7 October	"Human"	Rag'n'Bone Man	Illuminate	Shawn Mendes
14 October	"Human"	Rag'n'Bone Man	Ansa Woar	Voodoo Jürgens
21 October	"Human"	Rag'n'Bone Man	Schwarzoderweiss	Rainhard Fendrich
28 October	"Human"	Rag'n'Bone Man	Walls	Kings of Leon
4 November	"Human"	Rag'n'Bone Man	You Want It Darker	Leonard Cohen
11 November	"Human"	Rag'n'Bone Man	Memento	Böhse Onkelz
18 November	"Human"	Rag'n'Bone Man	This House Is Not for Sale	Bon Jovi
25 November	"Human"	Rag'n'Bone Man	Dreams	Shindy
2 December	"Human"	Rag'n'Bone Man	Hardwired... to Self-Destruct	Metallica
9 December	"Rockabye"	Clean Bandit featuring Sean Paul and Anne-Marie	MTV Unplugged	Andreas Gabalier
16 December	"Rockabye"	Clean Bandit featuring Sean Paul and Anne-Marie	Blue & Lonesome	The Rolling Stones
23 December	"Rockabye"	Clean Bandit featuring Sean Paul and Anne-Marie	Imperator	Kollegah
30 December	No Top 40 released			
