= List of number-one albums of 2016 (Canada) =

These are the Canadian number-one albums of 2016. The chart is compiled by Nielsen Soundscan and published by Jam! Canoe, issued every Sunday. The chart also appears in Billboard magazine as Top Canadian Albums.

Note that Billboard publishes charts with an issue date approximately 10–11 days in advance.

== Number-one albums ==
Key
†	Indicates best-performing album of 2016

Issue date	Album	Artist(s)	Ref.
January 2	25 †	Adele	
January 9	25 †	Adele	
January 16	25 †	Adele	
January 23	25 †	Adele	
January 30	Blackstar	David Bowie	
February 6	25 †	Adele	
February 13	25 †	Adele	
February 20	Anti	Rihanna	
February 27	25 †	Adele	
March 5	25 †	Adele	
March 12	25 †	Adele	
March 19	I Like It When You Sleep, for You Are So Beautiful yet So Unaware of It	The 1975	
March 26	Untitled Unmastered	Kendrick Lamar	
April 2	Purpose	Justin Bieber	
April 9	La Voix: IV	Soundtrack	
April 16	Mind of Mine	Zayn	
April 23	Lukas Graham	Lukas Graham	
April 30	Cleopatra	The Lumineers	
May 7	The Very Best of Prince	Prince	
May 14	Lemonade	Beyoncé	
May 21	Views	Drake	
May 28	Views	Drake	
June 4	Views	Drake	
June 11	Views	Drake	
June 18	Views	Drake	
June 25	Views	Drake	
July 2	Views	Drake	
July 9	Man Machine Poem	The Tragically Hip	
July 16	Views	Drake	
July 23	California	Blink-182	
July 30	Views	Drake	
August 6	Views	Drake	
August 13	Views	Drake	
August 20	Afraid of Heights	Billy Talent	
August 27	Suicide Squad: The Album	Soundtrack	
September 3	Suicide Squad: The Album	Soundtrack	
September 10	Yer Favourites	The Tragically Hip	
September 17	Encore un soir	Celine Dion	
September 24	Encore un soir	Celine Dion	
October 1	Encore un soir	Celine Dion	
October 8	Views	Drake	
October 15	Illuminate	Shawn Mendes	
October 22	22, A Million	Bon Iver	
October 29	Revolution Radio	Green Day	
November 5	Walls	Kings of Leon	
November 12	You Want It Darker	Leonard Cohen	
November 19	The Stage	Avenged Sevenfold	
November 26	You Want It Darker	Leonard Cohen	
December 3	You Want It Darker	Leonard Cohen	
December 10	Hardwired... to Self-Destruct	Metallica	
December 17	Starboy	The Weeknd	
December 24	Starboy	The Weeknd	
December 31	4 Your Eyez Only	J. Cole	

== See also ==
- List of Canadian Hot 100 number-one singles of 2016
