= Glen Scott =

British record producer

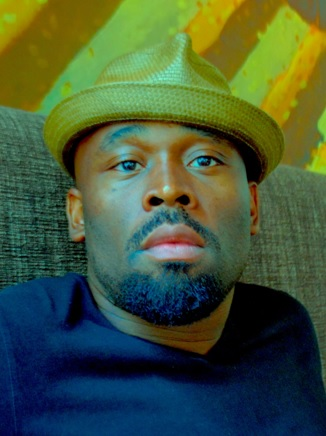

Background information
- Born: Glenvin Anthony Scott; 29 August 1973 (age 52)
- Genres: Pop, pop rock, R&B, soul, hip hop, dance, blues, gospel, jazz
- Occupations: Producer, arranger, mixing engineer, singer-songwriter, session musician, multi-instrumentalist
- Years active: 1990–present
- Labels: BMG (publishing) (1994); 550 Music/Sony Music (1997–2002)
- Website: glenscottmusic.com

Glen Scott (born Glenvin Anthony Scott on 29 August 1973) is a British producer, arranger, mixing engineer, singer-songwriter, and session musician.

Glen Scott is currently living and working in London. He has worked with artists such as James Morrison, Mary J. Blige, Eric Bibb, James Blunt, Craig David, and Backstreet Boys.

== Music career ==
=== Early career ===
Glen Scott was born to Jamaican immigrants, his father a reverend and mother a teacher.

Glen Scott's early years were spent in North London where he was exposed to music at a very young age through his father's church. By the age of 11, he was playing both the Hammond organ and drums. At the age of 16, he began touring the world and recording with Dr. Robert from New wave Pop Rock band The Blow Monkeys.

=== 1994–1999: first publishing and record deal ===
After being extremely active as a young session musician in London, Glen Scott's songwriting and artist career began some 5 years later when he signed his first publishing deal with BMG at the age of 21. In 1996, he met up with Swedish producer and songwriter Martin Terefe and formed a songwriting partnership.

In 1997, Glen Scott signed a record deal with Sony Music/550 Music in New York City and in 1999 released his debut album Without Vertigo.

=== 2012–present ===
In October 2012, Glen Scott joined a community of talented and diverse writers, composers, session musicians and producers at Kensaltown Studios, West London where he currently resides.

In September 2013, Glen Scott produced Eric Bibb's acclaimed album Jericho Road. In October 2013, he joined Eric Bibb as music director on a three weeks tour of the UK.

In January 2014, Jericho Road was awarded the prestigious prize for Best Album in 2013 at the Academy of Jazz of Paris in France.

== Discography and certifications ==
=== As solo artist ===
==== Studio albums ====
- Without Vertigo (1999) (Sony Music/550 Records)
- The Deafening Silence (2000) (Sodarock Entertainment)
- Do Something (EP) (2002) (Sony Music Japan)
- Soulrider (2002) (Sony Music Japan)
- Trust the Dawn Extended (2009) (Japan)
- Trust the Dawn (2012) (Hidden Beach Recordings)

==== Singles ====
- "Heaven" (1999) (Sony Music/550 Records)
- "Easy" (1999) (Sony Music Japan)
- "Deep in It" (2010) (Hidden Beach Recordings)

=== As musician/writer/producer ===
Year	Song	Artist	Album/Single	Credits	Label	Certifications
1993	"Shoop (remix)"	Salt-n-Pepa	Very Necessary	Keyboards	London Records	—
1993	"Just Kickin' It"	Xscape	Hummin' Comin' at 'Cha	Keyboards	So So Def/Columbia/Sony Music	United States (RIAA): Platinum
1994	–	Dr. Robert	Realms of Gold	Keyboards, vocals	–	—
1994	"I Ain't Movin' (Femi Fem Basic Mix)"	Des'ree	I Ain't Movin'	Keyboards	Sony Soho^{2}/Sony Music	—
1995	–	Dr. Robert	Bethesda	Keyboards, vocals	–	—
1995	"Itchycoo Park"	M People	Bizarre Fruit II	Backing vocals	Deconstruction Records/Polydor Records	United Kingdom (BPI): 5× Platinum
1996	"Turn It Up"	Peter Andre	Natural	Keyboards	Mushroom Records	United Kingdom (BPI): Platinum
1999	"Father"	Tony Di Bart	Falling for You	Keyboards	Cleveland City Blues	—
1999	–	Marc Almond	Open All Night	Keyboards	Blue Star Music/Instinct Records	—
2000	–	Shea Seger	The May Street Project	All instruments	BMG/RCA Records	—
2000	"Without Vertigo"	Various	Once in a Lifetime (Soundtrack)	Featured artist	Antra Records	—
2000	"Halfway to Heaven"	Dr. Robert	Other Folk	Organ (Hammond, Farfisa), backing vocals	Fencat	—
2001	"Eternal Flame" "Tomorrow & Tonight"	Atomic Kitten	Right Now (re-issue)	Keyboards, additional musician	Innocent Records/Virgin Records	France (SNEP): Gold; New Zealand (RIANZ): Gold; Sweden (IFPI): Gold; United Kingdom (BPI): Gold
2001	–	Isak	Quiet Confessions	Producer, co-writer, musician	Monumental Recordings/Sony Music Sweden	—
2001	–	Heather Nova	South	Keyboards	V2 Records	—
2001	–	André De Lange	Educate Your Soul	Co-producer, co-writer, musician	Expansion Records	—
2001	–	Blue	All Rise	Keyboards	Innocent Records/Virgin Records	Australia (ARIA): Gold; Denmark (IFPI): Gold; Europe (IFPI): Platinum; New Zealand (RIANZ): 2× Platinum; United Kingdom (BPI): 4× Platinum
2001	–	Leona Naess	I Tried to Rock You But You Only Roll	All instruments	Innocent Records/Virgin Records	—
2002	–	Dr. Robert	Keep on Digging for the Gold	Keyboards, vocals	MCA Records	—
2002	–	Ron Sexsmith	Cobblestone Runway	Keyboards, bass	Nettwerk Records/V2 Records	—
2003	"Heavy Soul" "Everyone Will Have Their Day" "Spinning" "Moonflowers"	Clarkesville	The Half Chapter	B vocals, Rhodes	Wildstar Records	—
2003	"Guilty"	Blue	Guilty	Keyboards	Innocent Records/Virgin Records	—
2004	–	Dr. Robert	Live in Tokyo	Keyboards, vocals	–	—
2004	–	Juliet Turner	Season of the Hurricane	Keyboards, backing vocals	Valley Entertainment	—
2004	–	Alex Cuba	Humo de Tabaco	Guest artist, drums, piano	Shell Records	—
2005	–	André De Lange	Homecoming	Co-producer, co-writer, musician	Catfarm Recordings	—
2005	–	Susie Päivärinta	In the Sun	Backing vocals	Publishment Records	—
2005	–	Eric Bibb	A Ship Called Love	Producer, co-writer, musician, engineer	Telarc International	—
2005	–	Sarah Dawn Finer	Sarah Dawn Finer	Producer, co-writer, musician	Hagenburg	—
2006	"Stay" (featuring Glen Scott)	Dakota Star	–	Guest vocalist	Avex Entertainment	—
2006	–	Eric Bibb	Diamond Days	Producer, co-writer, musician, engineer	Telarc International	—
2006	–	James Morrison	Undiscovered	Keyboards, vocals	Polydor Records	Australia (ARIA): Gold; Denmark (IFPI): Gold; Europe (IFPI): Platinum; France (SNEP): Gold; Germany (BVMI): Gold; Ireland (IRMA): Platinum; Netherlands (NVPI): Gold; New Zealand (RIANZ): Platinum; Switzerland (IFPI): Gold; United Kingdom (BPI): 5× Platinum
2007	–	Samuel Ljungblahd	The Reason Why	Co-writer, musician	Eckworks Records	—
2007	–	Gareth Gates	Pictures of the Other Side	Talkbox, backing vocals	19 Recordings/UMTV	—
2007	–	Craig David	Trust Me	Co-writer, keyboards, Vocals	Sire Records/Warner Bros. Records	United Kingdom (BPI): Gold
2007	–	Cyndee Peters	Music for Little Hearts	Keyboards	–	—
2007	–	Sarah Dawn Finer	A Finer Dawn	Producer, co-writer, musician	Roxy Recordings	—
2007	–	Matts Alsberg	Two Legs Better	Backing vocals	Elmar	—
2008	–	Craig David	Greatest Hits	Co-writer, keyboards, vocals	Sire Records/Warner Bros. Records	United Kingdom (BPI): Silver
2008	–	Eric Bibb	Get on Board	Producer, co-writer, musician, engineer	Telarc International	—
2008	–	Eric Bibb	Spirit I Am	Producer, co-writer, musician, engineer	Telarc International	—
2008	–	Sarah Dawn Finer	Moving On	Producer, co-writer, musician	Roxy Recordings	—
2009	–	Terefe/Whitecross	From Here to Helsinki	Backing vocals	Kensal	—
2009	–	Waylon	Wicked Ways	Musician	Motown	Netherlands (NVPI): Platinum
2009	–	Emilia	My World	Musician	Warner Music Sweden	—
2009	"The Dawn"	Glen Scott	Cafe Groove	Primary artist	Harvest	—
2010	–	Eric Bibb	Troubadour Live	Producer, musician, engineer	Dixefrog	—
2010	–	Ulrika Ponten	When You Smile	Mix engineer, musician	Ulrika Ponten Music	—
2010	"Love Drunk"	Charlotte Church	Back to Scratch	Backing vocals	Dooby	—
2010	–	Joshua Radin	The Rock and the Tide	Keyboards, backing vocals	Mom + Pop Music	—
2011	"Need Someone"	Mary J. Blige	My Life II... The Journey Continues	Piano	Geffen Records	United States (RIAA): Gold
2011	–	Beverley Knight	Soul UK	Featured artist, keyboards, backing vocals	Hurricane Records Ltd	—
2011	"Cuddly Toy" "Apparently Nothing"	Beverley Knight	Cuddly Toy (Single)	Featured artist, keyboards, backing vocals	Hurricane Records Ltd	—
2012	"The People I Know"	Eric Hutchinson	Moving Up Living Down	Keyboards, programming, B vocals	Let's Break Records/Warner Bros. Records	—
2012	–	Jenny Bohman	One More Time	Producer, co-writer, musician	Rootsy/Warner Music	—
2013	"Everything to Me" "All You Need to Know" "Knee Deep in My Heart" "One of These Days" "Always Tomorrow" "When I Met You" "Everything's Gonna Be Alright" "Baby Lets Dance" "In the End" "You and Me"	Shane Filan	You and Me	Keyboards, programming, B vocals, percussion	Capitol Records	United Kingdom (BPI): Silver
2013	"Millionaire" "Make That Girl Mine"	Scouting for Girls	Greatest Hits	Programming, keyboards	Epic Records	—
2013	Deluxe World Tour Edition "Hot, Hot, Hot" "Take Care" "Breathe" "Madeleine" "Trust Me"	Backstreet Boys	In a World Like This	Producer, co-writer, programming, engineer, piano, organ, Wurlitzer	K-BAHN/BMG Rights Management	—
2013	–	Eric Bibb	Jericho Road	Producer, musician, engineer	Dixefrog	—
2013	"Heart to Heart" "Postcards" "Blue on Blue"	James Blunt	Moon Landing	Keyboards, programming, B vocals	Custard Records/Atlantic Records	Australia (ARIA): Platinum; Canada (CRIA): Gold; Germany (BVMI): Gold; Hungary (MAHASZ): Platinum; New Zealand (RIANZ): Gold; Switzerland (IFPI): Platinum; United Kingdom (BPI): Gold
2013	"Cette journée" "La Lune" "Déterre"	Zaz	Recto Verso	Keyboards, programming, B vocals	Play On/Sony Music	Austria (IFPI): Gold; Belgium (IFPI): Gold; France (SNEP): 3× Platinum; Germany (BVMI): Gold; Poland (ZPAV): Gold; Switzerland (IFPI): Platinum
2013	–	Martin Halla	Winter Days	Co-writer, keyboards	Universal Music Norway	—
2013	–	Manuel Carrasco	Confieso que he sentido	Keyboards	Universal Music Spain	Spain (PROMUSICAE): Platinum
2014	–	Tini	Undo My Heart	Co-writer, piano	Vox Watch Music	—
2014	"Not a Minute Too Late" "Need You"	Yana Bibb	Not a Minute Too Late	Producer, co-writer	Dixiefrog	—
2014	–	Engelbert Humperdinck	Engelbert Calling	Piano, organ, drums, bass, Wurlitzer, backing vocals, arranger	Conehead	—
2014	"Heart to Heart"	James Blunt	Heart to Heart (Single)	Keyboards	Custard Records/Atlantic Records	—
2014	"Besos" "Nube De Luz" "Apnea"	Ricardo Arjona	Viaje	Piano, whistle, backing vocals	Metamorfosis/Warner Music Latina	Mexico (AMPROFON): Gold
2014	"I Found My Flow" "She's Not Anyone"	Denise Pearson	Imprint	Producer, co-writer, musician	Baronet Entertainment	—
2014	–	Luis Fonsi	8	Piano, organ, Wurlitzer, bass, percussion	Universal Music Latin Entertainment	—
2014	"Show You"	Shawn Mendes	The Shawn Mendes EP	Co-producer, Wurlitzer, percussion	Island	—
2014	"Two Sides"	Kenny "Blues Boss" Wayne	Rolling with the Blues Boss	Engineer	Stony Plain Records	—
2014	"Relax"	Sie7e	Relax	Co-writer	Warner Music Latina	—
2014	–	Amaia Montero	Si Dios quiere, yo también	Co-writer, co-producer, piano, Wurlitzer, organ, programmer, backing vocals	Sony Music	—
2014	"88"	Lowell	We Loved Her Dearly	Additional production	Arts & Crafts Productions	—
2014	–	Eric Bibb	Blues People	Co-writer, producer, arranger, featured artist, mix engineer, engineer, drums, bass, piano, Wurlitzer, Hammond, programmer, synths, backing vocals	Stony Plain Records	—
2015	"Never Be Alone" "Bring It Back" "Crazy" "Show You" "This is What It Takes" "Imagination" "Kid in Love" "I Don't Even Know Your Name"	Shawn Mendes	Handwritten	Co-writer, co-producer, piano, Wurlitzer, organ, programmer, backing vocals	Island	—
2015	"Staring at the Sun" "Porcelin" "Ordinary Man"	Mika	No Place in Heaven	Piano, Wurlitzer	Universal	—
2015	"Buried in Detroit"	Mike Posner	The Truth	Keyboards	Island	—
2015	"Believe"	Shawn Mendes	Descendants	Co-writer, co-producer, piano, Wurlitzer, programmer, backing vocals	Walt Disney Records	—
2015	"Shy" "My Big Mistake"	Stacey Solomon	Shy	Co-producer, co-writer, piano, drums, backing vocals, bass, programming	Conehead Management Ltd	—
2015	–	Buika	Vivir Sin Miedo	Co-writer, drums, Fender Rhodes, organ, percussion, piano, programming, synthesizer, synthesizer bass, vocals (background), Wurlitzer	Warner Music	—
2015	"Heaven to a Fool"	James Morrison	Higher Than Here	Backing vocals	Island	—
2015	"Swimming in a River of Songs"	Eric Bibb	Lead Bellys Gold	Engineer, drums, bass, Wurlitzer	Stony Plain Records	—
2016	–	Femme Schmidt	Raw	Producer, engineer, co-writer, drums, Fender Rhodes, organ, percussion, piano, programming, synthesizer, synthesizer bass, vocals (background), Wurlitzer	Warner Music Germany	—
2016	"Live at Madison Square Garden"	Shawn Mendes	Never Be Alone	Co-writer	Island Records	—
2016	"At Night Alone"	Mike Posner	At Night Alone	Fender Rhodes, Keyboards, Organ, Piano	Island	—
2017	"Paradise"	James Blunt	The Afterlove	Organ, Piano	East West/Atlantic Records	—
2017	"MTV Unplugged"	Shawn Mendes	Never Be Alone	Co-writer	Island Records/Virgin/EMI	—
2017	"Circo Soledad"Circo Soledad"	Ricardo Arjona	Circo Soledad	Keyboards, Organ, Piano, backing vocals	Sony Music (label)/Sony Music	
2017	Migration Blues Deluxe	Eric Bibb	Migration Blues Deluxe	producer, arranger, engineer, drums, bass, Keyboards, programmer, synths, backing vocals	Dixiefrog Records	—
