= Apague la Luz y Escuche =

Apague La Luz y Escuche

Compilation album by Ricardo Arjona
- Released: July 29, 2016
- Genre: Latin pop
- Label: Sony Music
- Producer: Ricardo Arjona, Lee Levin, Dan Warner

Ricardo Arjona chronology
Viaje (2014)	Apague La Luz y Escuche (2016)	Circo Soledad (2017)

Apague La Luz y Escuche is a compilation album released by Guatemalan singer-songwriter Ricardo Arjona on through Sony Music on July 29, 2016. It contains ballads from previous studio albums released by Arjona from 1993 to 2014. The album charted at number 16 on the US Billboard Top Latin Albums chart and at number one on the Billboard Latin Pop Albums component chart.

== Content and release ==
Apague La Luz y Escuche is the first compilation album released by Arjona since Lo Esencial De Ricardo Arjona in 2010.

== Track listing ==
1. "Adiós Melancolía" – 5:16
2. "Te Acuerdas de Mí (Carta No. 2)" – 4:10
3. "Quesos, Cosas, Casas" – 4:42
4. "Para Bien o Para Mal (featuring Buena Fe)" – 4:34
5. "Lo Poco Que Queda de Mí" – 4:21
6. "Nada Es Como Tú" – 3:30
7. "Asignatura Pendiente" – 4:07
8. "Malena" – 2:53
9. "Que Nadie Vea" – 2:53
10. "A La Medida" – 5:17
11. "Su Menester" – 4:20
12. "Cisnes" – 4:48
13. "Duerme" – 4:40
14. "Caudillo" – 5:12
15. "De Vez En Mes" – 5:12
16. "Mi Novia Se Me Está Poniendo Vieja (featuring Carlos Varela)" – 5:01
17. "Te Juro (Bonus Track)" – 4:07
18. "Puente (Bonus Track)" – 4:48

== Chart performance ==
Chart (2016)	Peak position
Spanish Albums (Promusicae)	93
US Top Latin Albums (Billboard)	3
US Latin Pop Albums (Billboard)	1

== Certifications ==
Region	Certification
Argentina (CAPIF)	Gold
