= Lo Poco Que Tengo =

Single by Ricardo Arjona

from the album Viaje
- Released: April 22, 2014
- Genre: Latin pop
- Length: 3:51
- Label: Metamorfosis, Warner Music
- Songwriter: Ricardo Arjona

Ricardo Arjona singles chronology
"Apnea" (2014)	"Lo Poco Que Tengo" (2014)	"Cavernícolas" (2015)

"Lo Poco Que Tengo" ("What Little That I Have") is a song written by Guatemalan singer-songwriter Ricardo Arjona for his fourteenth studio album, Viaje. The song was released the song as the second single from the record, on April 22, 2014.

== Charts ==
Chart (2014)	Peak position
Dominican Republic Pop Chart (Monitor Latino)	3
Mexico (Monitor Latino)	10
Mexico (Billboard Mexican Airplay)	19
US Hot Latin Songs (Billboard)	17
US Latin Airplay (Billboard)	13
US Latin Pop Airplay (Billboard)	3
Venezuela (Record Report)	34

=== Year-end charts ===
Chart (2014)	Position
US Latin Songs	59
US Latin Pop Songs	25
