= Viaje (Ricardo Arjona album) =

Studio album by Ricardo Arjona
- Released: 29 April 2014
- Genre: Latin pop
- Label: Metamorfosis, Warner Music
- Producer: Ricardo Arjona

Ricardo Arjona chronology
Metamorfosis: En Vivo (2013)	Viaje (2014)	Apague la Luz y Escuche (2016)

Singles from Viaje
- 1. "Apnea" Released: 4 March 2014; 2. "Lo Poco Que Tengo" Released: 22 April 2014; 3. "Cisnes" Released: 21 April 2014

Viaje is the fourteenth Spanish-language studio album by Guatemalan singer-songwriter Ricardo Arjona. The album —the second independent release by Arjona after he was signed by Sony Music in 1993 and Warner Music in 2008— was released on 29 April 2014 by Arjona's own label, Metamorfosis. The album received a Latin Grammy Award nomination for Best Singer-Songwriter Album. The first single from Viaje is "Apnea", released on 4 March 2014.

Professional ratings
Review scores
Source	Rating
AllMusic	4/5 stars

== Track listing ==
All tracks are written by Ricardo Arjona.

No.	Title	Length
1.	"Lo Poco Que Tengo"	3:53
2.	"Cavernicolas"	4:49
3.	"Nube de luz"	3:03
4.	"Apnea"	4:06
5.	"Viaje"	3:57
6.	"Soldado raso"	3:39
7.	"Vives para morir"	3:28
8.	"Tu fantasma"	3:56
9.	"A la luna en bicicleta"	3:31
10.	"Piel pecado"	4:00
11.	"Invertebrado"	5:04
12.	"Tu boca"	3:16
13.	"Pedigri"	3:53
14.	"Cisnes"	4:45

== Charts ==
=== Weekly charts ===
Chart (2014)	Peak position
Argentine Albums (CAPIF)	1
Ecuadorian Albums (Musicalisimo)	3
Mexican Albums (AMPROFON)	3
Spanish Albums (PROMUSICAE)	47
Uruguayan Albums (CUD)	1
US Billboard 200	35
US Top Latin Albums (Billboard)	1
US Latin Pop Albums (Billboard)	1
Venezuelan Albums (Recordland)	1

=== Year-end charts ===
Chart (2014)	Position
Mexican Albums (AMPROFON)	15
US Latin Albums	11
US Latin Pop Albums	4
Chart (2015)	Position
US Latin Albums	66
US Latin Pop Albums	15

=== Certifications ===
Region	Certification	Certified units/sales
Mexico (AMPROFON)	2× Platinum	120,000^{‡}
United States (RIAA)	Gold (Latin)	30,000^{^}
Venezuela (APFV)	2× Platinum	20,000
^{^} Shipments figures based on certification alone.^{‡} Sales+streaming figures based on certification alone.

== See also ==
- List of number-one Billboard Latin Albums from the 2010s
- Ricardo Arjona discography
