= Illuminate (Shawn Mendes album) =

Studio album by Shawn Mendes
- Released: September 23, 2016
- Recorded: February – August 2016
- Studios: Noble Street Studios (Toronto, Ontario)
- Genres: Pop; rock; blues
- Length: 41:15
- Label: Island
- Producers: Jake Gosling; Teddy Geiger; Andrew Maury; Dan Romer; Daylight; Laleh Pourkarim; Scott Harris

Shawn Mendes chronology
Handwritten (2015)	Illuminate (2016)	Live at Madison Square Garden (2016)

Singles from Illuminate
- 1. "Treat You Better" Released: June 3, 2016; 2. "Mercy" Released: October 18, 2016

Singles from Illuminate (Deluxe)
- 1. "There's Nothing Holdin' Me Back" Released: April 20, 2017

Illuminate is the second studio album by Canadian singer-songwriter Shawn Mendes. It was released on September 23, 2016, through Island Records. It is a follow-up to his debut album Handwritten (2015). Musically, the album contains music genres pop, rock and blues. The album debuted atop the US Billboard 200 and the Canadian Albums Chart. It was preceded by the lead single "Treat You Better", which reached the top 10 on the Billboard Hot 100. This album was supported by the Illuminate World Tour, which began in March 2017.

== Singles ==
"Treat You Better" was released as the lead single from the album on June 3, 2016. The music video was released on July 12, 2016. It features a storyline where Mendes tries to help a girl in an abusive relationship, and says he can treat her better than her current partner. The song currently has almost two billion views on YouTube. Since its release, "Treat You Better" has peaked at number 6 on the US Billboard Hot 100.

"Mercy" was serviced to US top 40 radio stations as the second single from the album on October 18, 2016.

"There's Nothing Holdin' Me Back" was released as the album's third single on April 20, 2017. The song debuted at number 7 in the United Kingdom, becoming his highest debut in the country. It also debuted in the top ten in Australia and Denmark. The iTunes version of both the standard and deluxe versions of Illuminate were reissued with "There's Nothing Holdin' Me Back" as track one upon the single's release.

=== Promotional singles ===
Along with the pre-order of Illuminate, "Ruin" was released as the album's first promotional single on July 8, 2016. Its music video was released on July 18, 2016.

On July 28, 2016, "Three Empty Words" was released as the second promotional single from the album.

"Mercy" was released as the album's third and final promotional single on August 18, 2016. Its music video was released on September 21, 2016, receiving over 200 million views. It features Mendes in a car which is filling up with water and it also features Mendes trashing a room with guitars, a drum-set and a piano.

== Critical reception ==
Professional ratings
Review scores
Source	Rating
AllMusic	3.5/5 stars
Idolator	3.5/5 stars
Renowned for Sound	4/5 stars
Rolling Stone	3.5/5 stars

The album received generally positive reviews from music critics.

Writing for Rolling Stone, Joe Levy noted "Illuminate mixes professions of romantic agony like "Mercy" (where a quietly hummed hook explodes into crashing drums), with nice-boy valentines like "Treat You Better" and bedroom come-ons like "Lights On"" while naming the album "disarmingly intimate." Jon Reyes of Idolator, wrote that "[Shawn's] most noticeable change, aside from the tight music hall sonics, is the subtle infusion of sex into the lyrics" as well as feeling that the record as a whole "displays his lyrical development" and "polishes a proven formula."

Stephen Thomas Erlewine of AllMusic wrote that the album has "a bit of grace and warmth" and that Mendes "came into his own on Illuminate while also complimenting his "small and sweet" voice and how he "has gelled into his pop persona." Sonia de Freitas, writing for Renowned for Sound, noticed that it "is apparent that Mendes has shifted to a more mature and soulful sound, and far more introspective lyrical content" while praising his vocals, writing that "he sings earnestly, with an emotive delivery in every song."

Billboard listed the track "Don't Be a Fool" at number 90 for the best deep cuts from 21st century pop stars. Associated Press listed it at number 5 on their best albums of 2016.

=== Accolades ===
Award ceremony	Category	Result
Juno Awards of 2017	Album of the Year	Nominated
Juno Awards of 2017	Pop Album of the Year	Nominated
ARIA Music Awards of 2017	Best International Artist	Nominated

== Commercial performance ==
Illuminate debuted at number one on the US Billboard 200 with 145,000 equivalent album units, of which 121,000 copies were pure album sales. It became Mendes' second number-one album in the US and his best sales week. Mendes achieved his second number one at 18 years, two months and seven days old, becoming the fifth youngest artist to score their first two number one, following Justin Bieber, Miley Cyrus, Hilary Duff and LeAnn Rimes. In addition, Mendes is the first artist to have their first two full-length studio albums hit number one since 5 Seconds of Summer bowed at number one with Sounds Good Feels Good (2015) and their self-titled debut album (2014), and the first male artist to claim the distinction since 2015, when ASAP Rocky bowed atop the list with At. Long. Last. ASAP, following 2013’s Long. Live. ASAP.

In his native Canada, the album debuted at number one with 21,000 total consumption units, of which 17,000 were album units sold, surpassing the highest one week sales total reached with his last album, Handwritten. Illuminate also picked up 3.8 million audio on-demand streams, the second highest total of the week, trailing only Drake's Views.

== Track listing ==
Illuminate – Standard version
No.	Title	Writer(s)	Producer(s)	Length
1.	"Ruin"	Shawn Mendes; Ido Zmishlany; Scott Harris; Geoffrey Warburton; Zubin Thakkar	Jake Gosling	4:01
2.	"Mercy"	Mendes; Teddy Geiger; Danny Parker; Ilsey Juber	Gosling; Geiger	3:28
3.	"Treat You Better"	Mendes; Geiger; Harris	Geiger; Dan Romer; DJ "Daylight" Kyriakides	3:07
4.	"Three Empty Words"	Mendes; Harris; Zmishlany; Warburton	Gosling	3:19
5.	"Don't Be a Fool"	Mendes; Harris; Warburton	Gosling	3:35
6.	"Like This"	Mendes; Laleh Pourkarim; Gustaf Thörn	Pourkarim	3:06
7.	"No Promises"	Mendes; Harris; Geiger	Geiger	2:46
8.	"Lights On"	Mendes; Harris; Warburton	Gosling	3:21
9.	"Honest"	Mendes; Harris; Warburton	Gosling; Harris	3:19
10.	"Patience"	Mendes; Harris; Geiger	Gosling	2:55
11.	"Bad Reputation"	Mendes; Harris; Warburton	Gosling	3:18
12.	"Understand"	Mendes; Harris; Geiger; Warburton	Gosling	5:00
Total length:				41:15

Illuminate – Deluxe version bonus tracks
No.	Title	Writer(s)	Producer(s)	Length
13.	"Hold On"	Mendes; Harris; Warburton	Gosling	3:19
14.	"Roses"	Mendes; Tobias Jesso Jr.; Tom Hull	Gosling	3:52
15.	"Mercy" (acoustic)	Mendes; Geiger; Parker; Juber	Gosling; Geiger	3:39
Total length:				52:05

Illuminate – Japanese version bonus tracks
No.	Title	Length
16.	"Stitches"	3:27
17.	"Treat You Better" (live at Madison Square Garden)	4:17
18.	"Ruin" (live at Madison Square Garden)	7:53
Total length:		60:11

Illuminate – Illuminate World Tour reissue
No.	Title	Writer(s)	Producer(s)	Length
1.	"There's Nothing Holdin' Me Back"	Mendes; Geiger; Harris; Warburton	Geiger; Andrew Maury	3:19
Total length:				55:24

Illuminate – Japanese special edition bonus tracks
No.	Title	Length
17.	"Stitches"	3:27
18.	"There's Nothing Holdin' Me Back" (acoustic)	3:21
19.	"There's Nothing Holdin' Me Back" (NOTD remix)	3:14
20.	"Treat You Better" (Ashworth remix)	3:53
Total length:		69:19

Illuminate – 10th anniversary deluxe edition bonus tracks
No.	Title	Writer(s)	Producer(s)	Length
1.	"There's Nothing Holdin' Me Back"	Mendes; Geiger; Harris; Warburton	Geiger; Maury	3:19
16.	"Cold in California" (2016 demo)	Mendes; Ammar Malik; Dan Wilson	Wilson	4:04
17.	"What If I Told You a Story" (2016 demo)	Mendes; Harris; Warburton	Mendes	2:40
18.	"She'll Be the One" (2016 demo)	Mendes; Thakkar	Mendes; Thakkar	3:43
19.	"Treat You Better" (live from New York)	Mendes; Geiger; Harris	Mendes	3:51
20.	"Ruin" (live from Boston)	Mendes; Zmishlany; Harris; Warburton; Thakkar	Mendes; Thakkar	5:22
21.	"Mercy" (live from Montreal)	Mendes; Geiger; Parker; Juber	Mendes; Thakkar	4:28

- Three different versions of the 10th anniversary edition were released, each featuring one of the 2016 demos: "Cold in California" on the version released via digital service providers, "What If I Told You a Story" on the version released via Mendes's webstore, and "She'll Be the One" on the vinyl released via Blood Records.

== Charts ==
=== Weekly charts ===
Chart (2016–2017)	Peak position
Australian Albums (ARIA)	3
Austrian Albums (Ö3 Austria)	1
Belgian Albums (Ultratop Flanders)	3
Belgian Albums (Ultratop Wallonia)	11
Canadian Albums (Billboard)	1
Croatian International Albums (HDU)ERROR in "Croatia": Missing parameters: id.	25
Czech Albums (ČNS IFPI)	7
Danish Albums (Hitlisten)	1
Dutch Albums (Album Top 100)	1
Finnish Albums (Suomen virallinen lista)	6
French Albums (SNEP)	16
German Albums (Offizielle Top 100)	2
Greek Albums (IFPI)	12
Hungarian Albums (MAHASZ)	21
Irish Albums (IRMA)	1
Italian Albums (FIMI)	3
Japanese Albums (Oricon)	61
Latvian Albums (LaIPA)	96
Mexican Albums (AMPROFON)	1
New Zealand Albums (RMNZ)	2
Norwegian Albums (VG-lista)	1
Polish Albums (ZPAV)	29
Portuguese Albums (AFP)	1
Scottish Albums (Official Charts)	3
Slovak Albums (ČNS IFPI)	25
South Korean Albums Overseas (Gaon)	32
Spanish Albums (Promusicae)	5
Swedish Albums (Sverigetopplistan)	1
Swiss Albums (Schweizer Hitparade)	2
UK Albums (Official Charts)	3
US Billboard 200	1

=== Year-end charts ===
Chart (2016)	Position
Australian Albums (ARIA)	67
Belgian Albums (Ultratop Flanders)	81
Danish Albums (Hitlisten)	27
Dutch Albums (MegaCharts)	28
French Albums (SNEP)	161
German Albums (Offizielle Top 100)	87
Icelandic Albums (Plötutíóindi)	62
Italian Albums (FIMI)	83
Mexican Albums (AMPROFON)	78
Spanish Albums (PROMUSICAE)	60
Swedish Albums (Sverigetopplistan)	35
UK Albums (OCC)	66
US Billboard 200	128
Chart (2017)	Position
Australian Albums (ARIA)	42
Canadian Albums (Billboard)	7
Danish Albums (Hitlisten)	4
Italian Albums (FIMI)	41
Mexican Albums (AMPROFON)	29
New Zealand Albums (RMNZ)	39
Spanish Albums (PROMUSICAE)	65
Swedish Albums (Sverigetopplistan)	9
UK Albums (OCC)	73
US Billboard 200	22
Chart (2018)	Position
Australian Albums (ARIA)	61
Danish Albums (Hitlisten)	24
Swedish Albums (Sverigetopplistan)	54
US Billboard 200	98
Chart (2019)	Position
Belgian Albums (Ultratop Flanders)	83
Danish Albums (Hitlisten)	47
Chart (2021)	Position
Belgian Albums (Ultratop Flanders)	139
Chart (2022)	Position
Belgian Albums (Ultratop Flanders)	162
Chart (2023)	Position
Belgian Albums (Ultratop Flanders)	134
Belgian Albums (Ultratop Wallonia)	170
Chart (2024)	Position
Belgian Albums (Ultratop Flanders)	95
Belgian Albums (Ultratop Wallonia)	180
Chart (2025)	Position
Belgian Albums (Ultratop Flanders)	105
Belgian Albums (Ultratop Wallonia)	200

=== Decade-end charts ===
Chart (2010–2019)	Position
US Billboard 200	182

== Certifications ==
Region	Certification	Certified units/sales
Australia (ARIA)	Platinum	70,000^{‡}
Austria (IFPI Austria)	Platinum	15,000^{*}
Belgium (BRMA)	3× Platinum	90,000^{‡}
Brazil (Pro-Música Brasil)	Platinum	40,000^{*}
Canada (Music Canada)	6× Platinum	480,000^{‡}
Denmark (IFPI Danmark)	6× Platinum	120,000^{‡}
France (SNEP)	Platinum	100,000^{‡}
Germany (BVMI)	Platinum	200,000^{‡}
Italy (FIMI)	2× Platinum	100,000^{‡}
Mexico (AMPROFON)	2× Platinum+Gold	150,000^{^}
Netherlands (NVPI)	Platinum	40,000^{‡}
New Zealand (RMNZ)	4× Platinum	60,000^{‡}
Norway (IFPI Norway)	Gold	15,000^{‡}
Poland (ZPAV)	3× Platinum	60,000^{‡}
Portugal (AFP)	Platinum	7,000^{‡}
Singapore (RIAS)	2× Platinum	20,000^{*}
Spain (Promusicae)	Gold	20,000^{‡}
Sweden (GLF)	2× Platinum	60,000^{‡}
United Kingdom (BPI)	Platinum	300,000^{‡}
United States (RIAA)	3× Platinum	3,000,000^{‡}
^{*} Sales figures based on certification alone.^{^} Shipments figures based on certification alone.^{‡} Sales+streaming figures based on certification alone.

== See also ==
- List of 2016 albums
- List of Billboard 200 number-one albums of 2016
- List of number-one albums of 2016 (Austria)
- List of number-one albums of 2016 (Canada)
- List of number-one albums of 2016 (Denmark)
- List of number-one albums of 2016 (Ireland)
- List of number-one albums of 2016 (Norway)
- List of number-one albums of 2016 (Portugal)
- List of number-one albums of 2016 (Sweden)
- List of UK top-ten albums in 2016
