= Apnea (Ricardo Arjona song) =

Single by Ricardo Arjona

from the album Viaje
- Released: 4 March 2014
- Recorded: 2013
- Genre: Latin pop
- Length: 4:06
- Label: Metamorfosis, Warner Music
- Songwriter: Ricardo Arjona

Ricardo Arjona singles chronology
| "Si Tu No Existieras" (2012) | "Apnea" (2014) | "Lo Poco Que Tengo" (2014) |

"Apnea" ("Apnoea") is a song recorded and written by Guatemalan recording artist Ricardo Arjona, released on 4 March 2014. The song is the lead single from his fourteenth studio album, Viaje. At the beginning of 2014, Arjona explained to People en Espanol that he couldn't find another perfect word to describe his past and reminiscing about his memories "Apnea" was the best word to fulfill his journey (Viaje). The music video was nominated for Video of the Year at the Lo Nuestro Awards of 2015.

== Charts ==
| Chart (2014) | Peak position |
|---|---|
| Dominican Republic Pop Chart (Monitor Latino) | 4 |
| Mexico (Billboard Mexican Airplay) | 8 |
| US Hot Latin Songs (Billboard) | 10 |
| US Latin Airplay (Billboard) | 1 |
| US Latin Pop Airplay (Billboard) | 2 |
| Venezuela (Record Report) | 1 |

=== Year-end charts ===
| Chart (2014) | Position |
|---|---|
| US Latin Songs | 53 |
| US Latin Pop Songs | 18 |

== See also ==
- List of Billboard number-one Latin songs of 2014
