= There's Nothing Holdin' Me Back =

Single by Shawn Mendes

from the album Illuminate
- Released: April 20, 2017
- Genre: Pop rock; folktronica
- Length: 3:25
- Label: Island; Universal
- Songwriters: Shawn Mendes; Teddy Geiger; Geoff Warburton; Scott Harris
- Producers: Teddy Geiger; Andrew Maury

Shawn Mendes singles chronology
"Mercy" (2016)	"There's Nothing Holdin' Me Back" (2017)	"In My Blood" (2018)

Music video
- "There's Nothing Holdin' Me Back" on YouTube

"There's Nothing Holdin' Me Back" is a song recorded by Canadian singer Shawn Mendes. Written by Mendes, Teddy Geiger, Geoff Warburton and Scott Harris, and produced by Geiger and Andrew Maury, it was released as a single on April 20, 2017. The song was included in the reissue of his second studio album Illuminate (2016). An accompanying music video was released on June 20, 2017. The single reached number one in The Czech Republic, Guatemala, and Serbia, as well as the top 10 in several additional countries, including the US and the UK. It is certified Diamond in Australia, Brazil, Canada, France, and Poland. It won an MTV Europe Music Award for Best Song in 2017 and a Juno Award for Single of the Year in 2018.

== Composition ==
"There's Nothing Holdin' Me Back"
A 26-second sample of the chorus, which features some electric guitar and "strained" vocals.

"There's Nothing Holdin' Me Back" is a "dance-y" pop rock track. A Billboard editor noted it features some electric guitar and "strained" vocals on the chorus. As the upbeat track progresses, it incorporates handclaps, funky guitar riffs, and foot-tapping bass. The pre-chorus was inspired by early works of Timbaland and Justin Timberlake.

== Critical reception ==
Writing for Billboard, Taylor Weatherby noted "the song's sound falls right in line with the guitar-laced goodness he brought on his sophomore effort, but this time bringing in a little more edge." Allison Bowsher for Much opined the sound "is a return to the earworms that launched Mendes' career back in 2015. Reminiscent of the high energy pop sensibilities of Mendes' "Something Big," today's new track plays with lifts and falls throughout, allowing Mendes to show off the strength of his voice." In MTV News, Madeline Roth thought the track is "more danceable than anything in his catalog. His voice is gritty and hoarse, especially on the passionate, aggressive hook."

TIME chose the song as a contender for one of the songs of the summer, commending the "smart use of both electric guitar and tropical house beat." Billboard considered it the 44th best song of the year, CBC Music named it the 5th.

== Live performances ==
"There's Nothing Holdin' Me Back" is featured on the Illuminate World Tour setlist. The singer performed the single on The Graham Norton Show on June 9, 2017, at Capital FM's Summertime Ball 2017 on June 10, The Tonight Show Starring Jimmy Fallon on June 19, at the 2017 MTV Video Music Awards on August 27, and at the 2017 MTV Europe Music Awards on 12 November 2017, in which Billboard named his performance the second best of the night. On May 18, 2018, Mendes was a special guest on Taylor Swift's Reputation Stadium Tour, and performed the song alongside Swift at the Rose Bowl in Pasadena, California.

== Chart performance ==
In the United States, "There's Nothing Holdin' Me Back" debuted at number 44 on the Billboard Hot 100 on the chart dating May 13, 2017. It then dropped down five positions the next week before steadily climbing up the charts throughout the summer, entering the top ten at number eight on the chart dating July 29, 2017, giving Mendes his third top ten single in the United States, following "Stitches" (2015), and "Treat You Better" (2016). The single would eventually reach its peak of number six four weeks later on the chart dating August 26, 2017, and spent a total of 34 weeks on the Billboard Hot 100, placing it at number 23 on the Billboard Year-End Hot 100 list for 2017.

In Canada, the song has also reached a peak of 6, becoming his highest-charting single in his home country at the time. He has since surpassed this peak with his single "If I Can't Have You" which reached number 2 in May 2019. It has reached the top 5 in several other countries such as Australia, Denmark, Germany, Ireland, Scotland, and the United Kingdom.

== Music video ==
The music video for the song was released on June 20, 2017, directed by Jay Martin, and produced by Cal Gordon. Filmed throughout various places in Europe, the video shows Mendes and his dating partner (played by actress Ellie Bamber) exploring Paris, Amsterdam and the United Kingdom and racing through transportation hubs, ride trains, and trek along the coastline while additional footage is also shown with Mendes out on tour from his concerts. It also serves as the sequel to the "Treat You Better" music video. In July 2021, the music video reached the 1 billion view milestone, Mendes' fourth video to do so.

== Usage in media ==
The song is heard in the television series The Good Doctor at the closing of Season 1, Episode 4 in a scene set in a bar. It was also the song used by Dancing with the Stars season 25 winners Jordan Fisher and Lindsay Arnold in their first dance, a tango, and by season 24 finalist Normani in her final fusion dance with Val Chmerkovskiy. It can also be heard in national TV ads for Ford Motor Company of Australia. The Portuguese supermarket chain Continente used a Portuguese language cover of the song in its 2018 TV Christmas campaign. It also appears in the movie Little Italy with Emma Roberts and Hayden Christensen. It is also featured in the 2021 film Sing 2, as well as its trailer, and it was covered by Taron Egerton and Tori Kelly on the film's soundtrack.

== Track listing ==
- Digital download (NOTD Remix)
1. "There's Nothing Holdin' Me Back" (NOTD remix) – 3:14
- Digital download (Acoustic)
1. "There's Nothing Holdin' Me Back" (Acoustic) – 3:21

== Accolades ==
Year	Award	Category	Result
2017	MTV Europe Music Awards	Best Song	Won
2017	MTV Video Music Awards	Song of the Summer	Nominated
2018	APRA Music Awards	International Work of the Year	Nominated
2018	BMI Awards	Award Winning Songs	Won
2018	iHeartRadio Music Awards	Best Music Video	Nominated
2018	iHeartRadio Music Awards	Best Lyrics	Nominated
2018	Juno Awards	Single of the Year	Won
2018	Radio Disney Music Awards	Song Of The Year	Nominated

== Charts ==
=== Weekly charts ===
Chart (2017–2022)	Peak position
Argentina Anglo (Monitor Latino)	17
Australia (ARIA)	4
Austria (Ö3 Austria Top 40)	3
Belgium (Ultratop 50 Flanders)	3
Belgium (Ultratop 50 Wallonia)	12
Brazil (Brasil Hot 100 Airplay)	6
Canada Hot 100 (Billboard)	6
Canada AC (Billboard)	1
Canada CHR/Top 40 (Billboard)	1
Canada Hot AC (Billboard)	1
Colombia (National-Report)	38
Costa Rica (Monitor Latino)	9
Czech Republic Airplay (ČNS IFPI)	1
Czech Republic Singles Digital (ČNS IFPI)	8
Denmark (Tracklisten)	4
Ecuador (National-Report)	8
Finland (Suomen virallinen lista)	18
France (SNEP)	36
Germany (GfK)	5
Global 200 (Billboard)	129
Guatemala (Monitor Latino)	1
Hungary (Rádiós Top 40)	4
Hungary (Single Top 40)	13
Ireland (IRMA)	3
Israel International Airplay (Media Forest)	6
Italy (FIMI)	14
Lebanon (Lebanese Top 20)	16
Malaysia (RIM)	10
Mexico Airplay (Billboard)	31
Netherlands (Dutch Top 40)	4
Netherlands (Single Top 100)	8
New Zealand (Recorded Music NZ)	8
Norway (VG-lista)	15
Philippines (Philippine Hot 100)	15
Poland Airplay (ZPAV)	9
Portugal (AFP)	7
Scottish Singles Sales (Official Charts)	2
Serbia Airplay (Radiomonitor)	1
Slovakia Airplay (ČNS IFPI)	4
Slovakia Singles Digital (ČNS IFPI)	7
Slovenia (SloTop50)	4
South Korea (Gaon)	17
Spain (Promusicae)	11
Sweden (Sverigetopplistan)	11
Switzerland (Schweizer Hitparade)	8
UK Singles (Official Charts)	4
Uruguay (Monitor Latino)	16
US Billboard Hot 100	6
US Adult Contemporary (Billboard)	1
US Adult Pop Airplay (Billboard)	1
US Dance Airplay (Billboard)	4
US Pop Airplay (Billboard)	1
Venezuela Anglo (Record Report)	7

2025–2026 weekly chart performance for "There's Nothing Holdin' Me Back"
Chart (2025–2026)	Peak position
Estonia Airplay (TopHit)	68
Global 200 (Billboard)	111

=== Year-end charts ===
Chart (2017)	Position
Australia (ARIA)	10
Austria (Ö3 Austria Top 40)	15
Belgium (Ultratop Flanders)	5
Belgium (Ultratop Wallonia)	39
Brazil (Pro-Música Brasil)	65
Canada (Canadian Hot 100)	16
Costa Rica (Monitor Latino)	14
Denmark (Tracklisten)	7
El Salvador (Monitor Latino)	57
France (SNEP)	104
Germany (Official German Charts)	19
Guatemala (Monitor Latino)	49
Honduras (Monitor Latino)	24
Hungary (Rádiós Top 40)	50
Hungary (Single Top 40)	50
Hungary (Stream Top 40)	17
Israel International Airplay (Media Forest)	49
Italy (FIMI)	25
Latvia Airplay (LaIPA)	24
Mexico Airplay (Monitor Latino)	51
Netherlands (Dutch Top 40)	7
Netherlands (Single Top 100)	28
New Zealand (Recorded Music NZ)	32
Paraguay (Monitor Latino)	49
Peru (Monitor Latino)	83
Poland (ZPAV)	65
Portugal (AFP)	20
Slovenia (SloTop50)	32
South Korea International (Gaon)	20
Spain (PROMUSICAE)	52
Sweden (Sverigetopplistan)	38
Switzerland (Schweizer Hitparade)	30
UK Singles (OCC)	16
US Billboard Hot 100	23
US Adult Contemporary (Billboard)	14
US Adult Top 40 (Billboard)	6
US Dance/Mix Show Airplay (Billboard)	15
US Mainstream Top 40 (Billboard)	4
Chart (2018)	Position
Hungary (Rádiós Top 40)	18
Portugal (AFP)	116
South Korea (Gaon)	68
US Adult Contemporary (Billboard)	7
Chart (2022)	Position
Global 200 (Billboard)	161
Chart (2024)	Position
Hungary (Rádiós Top 40)	36
Chart (2025)	Position
Hungary (Rádiós Top 40)	50

== Certifications ==
Region	Certification	Certified units/sales
Australia (ARIA)	11× Platinum	770,000^{‡}
Austria (IFPI Austria)	2× Platinum	60,000^{‡}
Belgium (BRMA)	2× Platinum	40,000^{‡}
Brazil (Pro-Música Brasil)	3× Diamond	750,000^{‡}
Canada (Music Canada)	Diamond	800,000^{‡}
Denmark (IFPI Danmark)	4× Platinum	360,000^{‡}
France (SNEP)	Diamond	333,333^{‡}
Germany (BVMI)	3× Gold	900,000^{‡}
Italy (FIMI)	4× Platinum	200,000^{‡}
Mexico (AMPROFON)	2× Platinum	120,000^{‡}
New Zealand (RMNZ)	7× Platinum	210,000^{‡}
Poland (ZPAV)	Diamond	250,000^{‡}
Portugal (AFP)	4× Platinum	40,000^{‡}
South Korea	—	2,500,000
Spain (Promusicae)	3× Platinum	180,000^{‡}
Sweden (GLF)	2× Platinum	80,000^{‡}
United Kingdom (BPI)	4× Platinum	2,400,000^{‡}
United States (RIAA)	9× Platinum	9,000,000^{‡}
Streaming
Japan (RIAJ)	Platinum	100,000,000^{†}
^{‡} Sales+streaming figures based on certification alone.^{†} Streaming-only figures based on certification alone.

== Release history ==
Region	Date	Format	Version	Label	Ref.
Worldwide	April 20, 2017	CD	Original	Island; Republic	
Worldwide	May 12, 2017	Digital download	NOTD Remix	Island	
Australia	July 6, 2017	Digital download	Acoustic	Island	

== See also ==
- List of Billboard Adult Contemporary number ones of 2017 and 2018 (U.S.)
- List of highest-certified singles in Australia
