= Mercy (Shawn Mendes song) =

Single by Shawn Mendes

from the album Illuminate
- Released: October 18, 2016
- Recorded: 2016
- Length: 3:28
- Label: Island; Universal
- Songwriters: Shawn Mendes; Teddy Geiger; Danny Parker; Ilsey Juber
- Producers: Jake Gosling; Teddy Geiger

Shawn Mendes singles chronology
"Treat You Better" (2016)	"Mercy" (2016)	"There's Nothing Holdin' Me Back" (2017)

Music video
- "Mercy" on YouTube

"Mercy" is a song by Canadian singer-songwriter Shawn Mendes. It was co-written by Mendes with Ilsey Juber, Danny Parker and Teddy Geiger, with the latter handling the song's production with Jake Gosling. It was released on August 18, 2016, through Island Records as the third promotional single, and later as the second single on October 18, 2016, from his second studio album, Illuminate (2016).

== Composition ==
"Mercy" is written in the key of B minor with a common time tempo of 144 to 152 beats per minute. Mendes's vocals span from B_{2} to A_{4} in the song.

== Music video ==
On September 21, 2016, a music video directed by Jay Martin was released. It features Mendes singing, switching between him drowning in a locked car in the ocean and him performing the song with instruments in a warehouse shot at TriBro Studios.

== Cover versions ==
In October 2016, Muslim Nasheed artist Siedd released a cover version of 'Mercy' on YouTube. The song which has over 1 million views on YouTube features a modern-style a capella arrangement with rewritten lyrics to reflect his Islamic faith.

== Chart performance ==
In the United States, the song peaked at number 15 on the Billboard Hot 100 and was the second single from Illuminate to reach the top 20. It also peaked at number 13 in Australia, number 15 in the UK and number 23 in Canada.

== Live performances ==
Mendes performed the song for the first time on The Tonight Show Starring Jimmy Fallon on September 22, 2016, backed by mallet drums, electric guitar, bass and piano. The singer later performed the song on Today on September 23, The Late Late Show with James Corden on September 28, The X Factor UK on October 23, and The X Factor Australia on October 31 as well as Saturday Night Live on December 3. Mendes performed the song live at the Juno Awards of 2017; this version was subsequently released as a digital download. On May 27, 2018, Mendes and singer James Bay performed the song together at BBC Music's Biggest Weekend.

== Track listing ==
Digital download
No.	Title	Length
1.	"Mercy"	3:28

Loote remix
No.	Title	Length
1.	"Mercy" (Loote remix)	3:23

Acoustic guitar version
No.	Title	Length
1.	"Mercy" (acoustic guitar)	3:41

Live from the JUNOs 2017
No.	Title	Length
1.	"Mercy" (Live from the JUNOs 2017)	3:37

== Charts ==
=== Weekly charts ===
Chart (2016–2017)	Peak position
Australia (ARIA)	13
Austria (Ö3 Austria Top 40)	8
Belgium (Ultratop 50 Flanders)	24
Belgium (Ultratop 50 Wallonia)	19
Canada Hot 100 (Billboard)	23
Canada AC (Billboard)	12
Canada CHR/Top 40 (Billboard)	8
Canada Hot AC (Billboard)	12
Czech Republic Airplay (ČNS IFPI)	3
Czech Republic Singles Digital (ČNS IFPI)	15
Denmark (Tracklisten)	7
Finland (Radiosoittolista)	37
France (SNEP)	168
Germany (GfK)	16
Hungary (Rádiós Top 40)	25
Hungary (Single Top 40)	22
Ireland (IRMA)	17
Italy (FIMI)	17
Netherlands (Dutch Top 40)	5
Netherlands (Single Top 100)	6
New Zealand (Recorded Music NZ)	18
Norway (VG-lista)	16
Poland Airplay (ZPAV)	71
Portugal (AFP)	3
Scottish Singles Sales (Official Charts)	8
Slovakia Airplay (ČNS IFPI)	28
Slovakia Singles Digital (ČNS IFPI)	18
Slovenia (SloTop50)	18
Spain (Promusicae)	66
Sweden (Sverigetopplistan)	20
Switzerland (Schweizer Hitparade)	4
UK Singles (Official Charts)	15
US Billboard Hot 100	15
US Adult Contemporary (Billboard)	11
US Adult Pop Airplay (Billboard)	2
US Dance Airplay (Billboard)	36
US Pop Airplay (Billboard)	6

=== Year-end charts ===
Chart (2016)	Position
Australia (ARIA)	70
Denmark (Tracklisten)	69
Germany (Official German Charts)	93
Netherlands (Dutch Top 40)	38
Netherlands (Single Top 100)	71
Chart (2017)	Position
Brazil (Pro-Música Brasil)	100
Canada (Canadian Hot 100)	84
Denmark (Tracklisten)	75
Iceland (Tónlistinn)	41
Italy (FIMI)	98
Netherlands (Dutch Top 40)	93
Netherlands (Single Top 100)	88
Portugal (AFP)	66
Switzerland (Schweizer Hitparade)	73
US Billboard Hot 100	54
US Adult Contemporary (Billboard)	22
US Adult Top 40 (Billboard)	15
US Mainstream Top 40 (Billboard)	25

== Certifications ==
Region	Certification	Certified units/sales
Australia (ARIA)	7× Platinum	490,000^{‡}
Austria (IFPI Austria)	2× Platinum	60,000^{‡}
Belgium (BRMA)	Platinum	20,000^{‡}
Brazil (Pro-Música Brasil)	2× Diamond	500,000^{‡}
Canada (Music Canada)	7× Platinum	560,000^{‡}
Denmark (IFPI Danmark)	4× Platinum	360,000^{‡}
France (SNEP)	Diamond	333,333^{‡}
Germany (BVMI)	Platinum	400,000^{‡}
Italy (FIMI)	3× Platinum	150,000^{‡}
Mexico (AMPROFON)	Platinum	60,000^{‡}
New Zealand (RMNZ)	4× Platinum	120,000^{‡}
Norway (IFPI Norway)	2× Platinum	80,000^{‡}
Poland (ZPAV)	2× Platinum	40,000^{‡}
Portugal (AFP)	2× Platinum	20,000^{‡}
Spain (Promusicae)	Platinum	60,000^{‡}
Sweden (GLF)	3× Platinum	120,000^{‡}
United Kingdom (BPI)	2× Platinum	1,200,000^{‡}
United States (RIAA)	6× Platinum	6,000,000^{‡}
^{‡} Sales+streaming figures based on certification alone.

== Release history ==
Region	Date	Format	Label	Ref.
Worldwide	August 18, 2016	Digital download	Island; Universal	
Worldwide	October 18, 2016	Top 40 radio	Island; Republic	
Worldwide	November 4, 2016	Digital download – Loote remix	Island; Universal	
Worldwide	January 27, 2017	Digital download – acoustic guitar version	Island; Universal	
Worldwide	April 2, 2017	Digital download – live from the Juno Awards of 2017	Island; Universal	
