= Treat You Better (Shawn Mendes song) =

Single by Shawn Mendes

from the album Illuminate
- B-side: "Ruin"
- Released: June 3, 2016
- Recorded: 2016
- Genre: Pop
- Length: 3:07
- Label: Island; Republic; Universal
- Songwriters: Mendes; Teddy Geiger; Scott Harris
- Producers: Geiger; Dan Romer; DJ "Daylight" Kyriakides

Shawn Mendes singles chronology
"I Know What You Did Last Summer" (2015)	"Treat You Better" (2016)	"Mercy" (2016)

Music video
- "Treat You Better" on YouTube

"Treat You Better" is a song by Canadian singer-songwriter Shawn Mendes, released through Island Records on June 3, 2016, as the lead single from his second studio album, Illuminate (2016). It was co-written by Mendes with Teddy Geiger, and Scott Harris, while Geiger produced the song alongside Dan Romer, and Daylight. The music video was released on July 12, 2016, and features a storyline about an abusive relationship.

"Treat You Better" peaked at number six on the US Billboard Hot 100, becoming his second top ten on the chart. Elsewhere, the song has topped charts in Poland, Slovakia and Slovenia, and peaked within the top ten of the record charts in Canada, the United Kingdom and 18 other countries.

== Composition ==
The song is written in the key of B♭ minor. and has a tempo of 83 beats per minute.

== Awards and nominations ==
Year	Award	Category	Result
2017	BMI Awards	Award Winning Songs	Won
2017	Canadian Radio Music Awards	SOCAN Song Of The Year	Nominated
2017	Juno Awards	Single Of The Year	Nominated
2017	MTV Video Music Awards	Best Pop Video	Nominated
2017	Radio Disney Music Awards	Song Of The Year	Won

== Critical reception ==
Billboard ranked "Treat You Better" at number 42 on their "100 Best Pop Songs of 2016" list. The New York Times's Jon Caramanica named it the eighth best song of the year.

== Music video ==
The music video was released on July 12, 2016. It features a plot revolving around a situation of violence between couples. The video shows a girl being abused by her boyfriend in various situations, while Mendes hopes to be with her and struggles to understand why she prefers to be in that relationship. The video ends displaying the number for the National Domestic Violence Hotline. The music video also stars Devon Aoki's half sister Ellie Stuart Hunter played with a guitar, drums and tambourines.

The video has received over 2.5 billion YouTube views as of July 2025, and is one of the site's 100 most-watched videos.

== Chart performance ==
On the issue dating June 25, 2016, the song debuted at number thirty four on the US Billboard Hot 100 and would later peak at number six on October 8, 2016, making it Mendes' second top 10 single. It also reached the top 10 on the Mainstream Top 40 and Adult Top 40 national airplay charts. In Canada, the song has peaked at number seven on the Canadian Hot 100, passing "Life of the Party" as his highest-peaking single in his home country. The song has additionally achieved a top 5 position on the national CHR and Hot AC airplay charts, and has been certified gold by Music Canada. "Treat You Better" has also reached the top 10 in multiple markets including Australia, Germany, and Sweden.

== Track listing ==
Digital download
No.	Title	Writer(s)	Length
1.	"Treat You Better"	Shawn Mendes; Teddy Geiger; Scott Harris	3:07

Digital download – Ashworth remix
No.	Title	Writer(s)	Length
1.	"Treat You Better" (Ashworth remix)	Mendes; Geiger; Harris	3:52

CD single
No.	Title	Writer(s)	Length
1.	"Treat You Better"	Mendes; Geiger; Harris	3:08
2.	"Ruin"	Mendes; Harris; Geoffrey Warburton; Ido Zmishlany	4:00
Total length:			7:08

== Live performances ==
Mendes' first televised performance of "Treat You Better" happened at the 2016 Much Music Video Awards on June 19. On July 12, 2016, he performed the song on The Tonight Show, and again on October 8, 2018, with Jimmy Fallon and his house band The Roots as backing using "classroom instruments".

== Charts ==
=== Weekly charts ===
2016–2018 weekly chart performance
Chart (2016–2018)	Peak position
Argentina Airplay (Monitor Latino)	12
Australia (ARIA)	4
Austria (Ö3 Austria Top 40)	4
Belgium (Ultratop 50 Flanders)	17
Belgium (Ultratop 50 Wallonia)	15
Canada Hot 100 (Billboard)	7
Canada AC (Billboard)	5
Canada CHR/Top 40 (Billboard)	4
Canada Hot AC (Billboard)	1
CIS Airplay (TopHit)	70
Czech Republic Airplay (ČNS IFPI)	33
Czech Republic Singles Digital (ČNS IFPI)	10
Denmark (Tracklisten)	4
Ecuador Airplay (National-Report)	39
Finland (Suomen virallinen lista)	19
France (SNEP)	39
Germany (GfK)	4
Germany Airplay (BVMI)	1
Hungary (Rádiós Top 40)	4
Hungary (Single Top 40)	13
Ireland (IRMA)	8
Italy (FIMI)	7
Japan Hot 100 (Billboard)	22
Lebanon (Lebanese Top 20)	2
Netherlands (Dutch Top 40)	5
Netherlands (Single Top 100)	8
Mexico Airplay (Billboard)	2
Mexico Anglo Airplay (Monitor Latino)	6
New Zealand (Recorded Music NZ)	11
Norway (VG-lista)	7
Poland Airplay (ZPAV)	1
Portugal (AFP)	7
Romania Airplay (Media Forest)	6
Russia Airplay (TopHit)	66
Scottish Singles Sales (Official Charts)	4
Serbia Airplay (Radiomonitor)	4
Slovakia Airplay (ČNS IFPI)	1
Slovakia Singles Digital (ČNS IFPI)	8
Slovenia Airplay (SloTop50)	1
Spain (Promusicae)	21
Sweden (Sverigetopplistan)	4
Switzerland (Schweizer Hitparade)	12
UK Singles (Official Charts)	6
US Billboard Hot 100	6
US Adult Contemporary (Billboard)	1
US Adult Pop Airplay (Billboard)	1
US Dance Airplay (Billboard)	17
US Pop Airplay (Billboard)	3

2026 weekly chart performance
Chart (2026)	Peak position
Global 200 (Billboard)	60
Malaysia (IFPI)	20
Malaysia International (RIM)	9
Philippines (Philippines Hot 100)	69
Romania Airplay (TopHit)	91

=== Year-end charts ===
Chart (2016)	Position
Argentina (Monitor Latino)	41
Australia (ARIA)	29
Austria (Ö3 Austria Top 40)	22
Belgium (Ultratop Flanders)	56
Belgium (Ultratop Wallonia)	46
Brazil (Brasil Hot 100)	42
Canada (Canadian Hot 100)	23
Denmark (Tracklisten)	20
France (SNEP)	141
Germany (Official German Charts)	24
Hungary (Rádiós Top 40)	78
Hungary (Single Top 40)	92
Italy (FIMI)	30
Netherlands (Dutch Top 40)	19
Netherlands (Single Top 100)	29
New Zealand (Recorded Music NZ)	50
Poland (ZPAV)	33
Slovenia (SloTop50)	42
Spain (PROMUSICAE)	64
Sweden (Sverigetopplistan)	20
Switzerland (Schweizer Hitparade)	40
UK Singles (OCC)	27
US Billboard Hot 100	28
US Adult Contemporary (Billboard)	24
US Adult Top 40 (Billboard)	14
US Mainstream Top 40 (Billboard)	14

Chart (2017)	Position
Brazil (Pro-Música Brasil)	99
Canada (Canadian Hot 100)	71
Hungary (Rádiós Top 40)	21
Paraguay (Monitor Latino)	69
Spain Airplay (PROMUSICAE)	34
US Billboard Hot 100	92
US Adult Contemporary (Billboard)	5
US Adult Top 40 (Billboard)	30

Chart (2022)	Position
Hungary (Rádiós Top 40)	37

Chart (2023)	Position
Hungary (Rádiós Top 40)	62

== Certifications ==
Region	Certification	Certified units/sales
Australia (ARIA)	10× Platinum	700,000^{‡}
Austria (IFPI Austria)	2× Platinum	60,000^{‡}
Belgium (BRMA)	Platinum	20,000^{‡}
Brazil (Pro-Música Brasil)	4× Diamond	1,000,000^{‡}
Canada (Music Canada)	Diamond	800,000^{‡}
Denmark (IFPI Danmark)	4× Platinum	360,000^{‡}
France (SNEP)	Diamond	333,333^{‡}
Germany (BVMI)	3× Gold	900,000^{‡}
Italy (FIMI)	4× Platinum	200,000^{‡}
Mexico (AMPROFON)	2× Platinum	120,000^{‡}
New Zealand (RMNZ)	5× Platinum	150,000^{‡}
Norway (IFPI Norway)	3× Platinum	120,000^{‡}
Poland (ZPAV)	Diamond	250,000^{‡}
Portugal (AFP)	3× Platinum	30,000^{‡}
Spain (Promusicae)	3× Platinum	180,000^{‡}
Sweden (GLF)	5× Platinum	200,000^{‡}
United Kingdom (BPI)	4× Platinum	2,400,000^{‡}
United States (RIAA)	9× Platinum	9,000,000^{‡}
^{‡} Sales+streaming figures based on certification alone.

== Release history ==
Region	Date	Format	Label	Ref.
Worldwide	June 3, 2016	Digital download	Island; Universal	
Worldwide	June 7, 2016	Contemporary hit radio	Island; Republic	
Worldwide	August 16, 2016	Digital download – Ashworth remix	Island; Universal	
Germany	August 19, 2016	CD single	Island; Universal	

== See also ==
- List of highest-certified singles in Australia
