= Jessie Reyez discography =

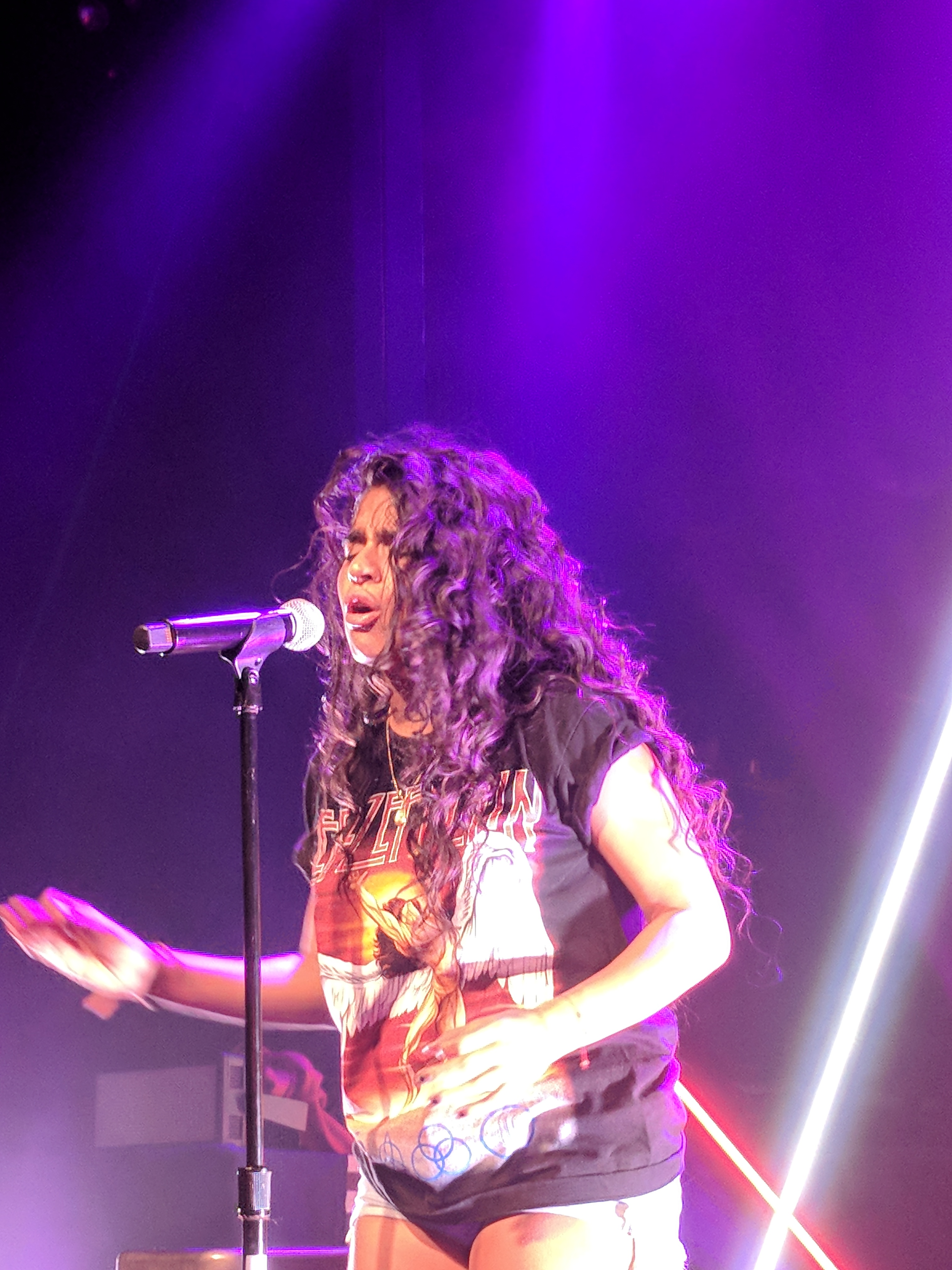
- Reyez performing in 2018
- Studio albums: 4
- EPs: 2
- Singles: 51
- Promotional singles: 2

Canadian singer and songwriter Jessie Reyez has released four studio albums, two extended plays, fifty-one singles (including ten as a featured artist) and two promotional singles. Her debut extended play, Kiddo, was released on April 21, 2017, by FMLY and Republic Records. It charted at number 83 in Canada. It includes her debut single, "Figures", which was certified double-platinum in Canada. It peaked in the country at number 58. Her second EP, Being Human in Public, was released on October 19, 2018. Her collaborative work with rapper Eminem has spawned two songs on his Kamikaze album.

Jessie's debut studio album, Before Love Came to Kill Us, was released on March 27, 2020, including the singles "Imported" with 6lack and "Love in the Dark", as well as a track with her common collaborator Eminem and her debut single "Figures".

== Studio albums ==
| Title | Studio album details | Peak chart positions | | | | | Certifications |
| Title | Studio album details | CAN | UK R&B | US | US R&B /HH | US R&B | Certifications |
|---|---|---|---|---|---|---|---|
| Before Love Came to Kill Us | Released: March 27, 2020; Label: FMLY, Island; Format: CD, LP, digital download, cassette, streaming | 17 | 10 | 13 | 9 | 4 | MC: Gold; RIAA: Gold |
| Yessie | Released: September 16, 2022; Label: FMLY, Island; Formats: CD, digital download, streaming | — | 7 | — | — | — | |
| Paid in Memories | Released: March 28, 2025; Label: FMLY, Island; Formats: CD, digital download, streaming | — | — | — | — | — | |
| A Little Vengeance | Released: June 12, 2026; Label: FMLY, Island; Formats: CD, digital download, streaming | — | — | 141 | 42 | 21 | |
"—" denotes items which were not released in that country or failed to chart.

== Extended plays ==
| Title | Extended play details | Peak chart positions | Certifications |
| Title | Extended play details | CAN | Certifications |
|---|---|---|---|
| Kiddo | Released: April 21, 2017; Label: FMLY, Republic; Format: Digital download, streaming | 83 | MC: Gold |
| Being Human in Public | Release: October 19, 2018; Label: FMLY, Island; Format: Digital download, streaming | — | |
| $till Paid | Release: March 17, 2026; Label: FMLY, Island; Format: Digital download, streaming | — | |
"—" denotes a recording that did not chart

== Singles ==
=== As lead artist ===
| Title | Year | Peak chart positions | | | | | | | Certifications | Album |
| Title | Year | CAN | CAN CHR | CAN Hot AC | NZ Hot | US Bub. | US R&B | US Rhy. | Certifications | Album |
|---|---|---|---|---|---|---|---|---|---|---|
| "Figures" | 2016 | 58 | 12 | 30 | — | — | — | 32 | MC: 3× Platinum; RIAA: Platinum | Kiddo and Before Love Came to Kill Us |
| "Shutter Island" | 2017 | — | — | — | — | — | — | — | MC: Gold | Kiddo |
| "Gatekeeper" | 2017 | — | — | — | — | — | — | — | | Kiddo |
| "Great One" | 2017 | — | 26 | 45 | — | — | — | — | MC: Gold | Kiddo |
| "Phone Calls" | 2017 | — | — | — | — | — | — | — | | Non-album singles |
| "Cotton Candy" | 2017 | — | — | — | — | — | — | — | | Non-album singles |
| "Figures, a Reprise" (featuring Daniel Caesar) | 2018 | — | — | — | — | — | — | — | | Non-album singles |
| "Body Count" (solo or remix featuring Normani and Kehlani) | 2018 | — | — | — | — | — | — | — | | Being Human in Public |
| "Apple Juice" | 2018 | — | — | — | — | — | — | — | | Being Human in Public |
| "Sola" | 2018 | — | — | — | — | — | — | — | | Being Human in Public |
| "F*** Being Friends" | 2018 | — | — | — | — | — | — | — | | Being Human in Public |
| "Dear Yessie" | 2018 | — | — | — | — | — | — | — | | Being Human in Public |
| "Imported" (featuring JRM or with 6lack) (Note: The version featuring JRM appears on the EP Being Human in Public, while the version with 6lack appears on the album Before Love Came to Kill Us.) | 2018 | — | — | — | 24 | 24 | 14 | 19 | MC: Platinum; ARIA: Gold; RIAA: 2× Platinum | Being Human in Public and Before Love Came to Kill Us |
| "Feels like Home" (with Bea Miller) | 2019 | — | — | — | — | — | — | — | | Lust |
| "Feel It Too" (with Tainy and Tory Lanez) | 2019 | 89 | 12 | 40 | — | — | — | — | | Non-album singles |
| "Ocean (Remix)" (with Karol G) | 2019 | — | — | — | — | — | — | — | | Non-album singles |
| "Far Away" (Note: This song only appears on the Target edition of Before Love Came to Kill Us.) | 2019 | — | — | — | — | — | — | — | | Before Love Came to Kill Us |
| "Honesty (Remix)" (with Pink Sweats) | 2019 | — | — | — | — | — | — | — | | Non-album singles |
| "Crazy" | 2019 | — | — | — | — | — | — | — | | Non-album singles |
| "Love in the Dark" | 2020 | — | 42 | — | — | — | — | — | | Before Love Came to Kill Us |
| "Intruders" | 2020 | — | — | — | — | — | — | — | | Before Love Came to Kill Us |
| "Before Love Came to Kill Us" | 2020 | — | — | — | — | — | — | — | | Before Love Came to Kill Us |
| "Rain" (with Grandson) | 2021 | — | — | — | — | — | — | — | | Non-album singles |
| "Fraud" | 2022 | — | — | — | — | — | — | — | | Non-album singles |
| "Mutual Friend" | 2022 | — | — | — | — | — | — | — | | Yessie |
| "Only One" | 2022 | — | 26 | 45 | — | — | — | — | | Yessie |
| "Forever" (with 6lack) | 2022 | — | — | — | — | — | — | — | | Yessie |
| "Gimme" (with Sam Smith and Koffee) | 2023 | 75 | — | — | 11 | — | — | — | | Gloria |
| "Jeans" (featuring Miguel) | 2023 | — | — | — | 36 | — | — | — | | Paid in Memories |
| "Shut Up" (with Big Sean) | 2024 | — | — | — | — | — | — | — | | Paid in Memories |
| "Ridin" (featuring Lil Wayne) | 2024 | — | — | — | 40 | — | — | — | | Paid in Memories |
| "Just Like That" (featuring Ari Lennox) | 2024 | — | — | — | — | — | — | — | | Paid in Memories |
| "Merry Nothin'" | 2024 | — | — | — | — | — | — | — | | Non-album single |
| "Goliath" | 2025 | — | — | — | — | — | — | — | | Paid in Memories |
| "Psilocybin & Daisies" | 2025 | — | — | — | — | — | — | — | | Paid in Memories |
| "NYB" | 2025 | — | 15 | 35 | — | — | — | — | | Paid in Memories |
| "Cudn't B Me" | 2025 | — | — | — | — | — | — | — | | Paid in Memories |
| "Ocean" (with Calvin Harris) | 2025 | — | 23 | — | — | — | — | — | | Non-album single |
| "N.Y.F.F" | 2026 | — | — | — | — | — | — | — | | A Little Vengeance |
| "Ain't U Tired" (with Muni Long) | 2026 | — | — | — | — | — | — | — | | A Little Vengeance |
| "Illuminate" (with Elyanna) | 2026 | — | — | — | — | — | — | — | | FIFA World Cup 2026 Official Album |
| "Ur Heartbeat (Who Do U Think About at 2AM?)" | 2026 | — | — | — | 33 | — | — | — | | A Little Vengeance |
| "99%" | 2026 | — | 31 | — | — | — | — | — | | A Little Vengeance |
| "Higher" | 2026 | — | — | — | — | — | — | — | | Non-album singles |
| "For Sixxx in the Morning" (with Samara Cyn) | 2026 | — | — | — | — | — | — | — | | Non-album singles |
| "Made for This" | 2026 | — | — | — | — | — | — | — | | Non-album singles |
| "Sovereign Land" | 2026 | — | — | — | — | — | — | — | | Non-album singles |
"—" denotes items which were not released in that country or failed to chart.

=== As featured artist ===
List of singles as lead artist, with selected chart positions
| Title | Year | Peak chart positions | | | | | | Album |
| Title | Year | CAN | AUS | NZ Hot | UK | US | US R&B | Album |
|---|---|---|---|---|---|---|---|---|
| "Hold Your Fire" (London Future featuring Jessie Reyez) | 2015 | — | — | — | — | — | — | Non-album singles |
| "K Goodnight" (Tim Suby featuring Jessie Reyez) | 2016 | — | — | — | — | — | — | Non-album singles |
| "Rush" (Lewis Capaldi featuring Jessie Reyez) | 2018 | — | — | — | — | — | — | Non-album singles |
| "Love Me Still" (Blvk Jvck featuring Jessie Reyez) | 2018 | — | — | — | — | — | — | Non-album singles |
| "Basement" (Russ featuring Jessie Reyez) | 2018 | — | — | — | — | — | 23 | Non-album singles |
| "Broken" (They. featuring Jessie Reyez) | 2018 | — | — | — | — | — | — | Fireside |
| "Sad Face Emojis" (Junia-T featuring Jessie Reyez) | 2019 | — | — | — | — | — | — | Non-album single |
| "I'm Not Here to Make Friends" (Sam Smith with Calvin Harris and Jessie Reyez) | 2023 | 32 | 40 | 2 | 23 | 71 | — | Gloria |
| "Perfect" (Sam Smith featuring Cat Burns and Jessie Reyez) | 2023 | — | — | — | — | — | — | Non-album single |
| "Candy Gum" (Emotional Oranges featuring Jessie Reyez and Becky G) | 2025 | — | — | — | — | — | — | Orenjii |
"—" denotes items which were not released in that country or failed to chart.

=== Promotional singles ===
| Title | Year | Album |
|---|---|---|
| "No Sweat" | 2020 | Non-album single |
| "Ankles" | 2020 | Before Love Came to Kill Us |

== Other charted songs ==
List of other charted songs, with selected chart positions and certifications
| Title | Year | Peak chart positions | | | | | | | | Certifications | Album |
| Title | Year | CAN | AUS | NZ Hot | SCO | SWE | US | US Dance | US R&B/HH | Certifications | Album |
|---|---|---|---|---|---|---|---|---|---|---|---|
| "Hard to Love" (Calvin Harris featuring Jessie Reyez) | 2017 | — | — | — | — | — | — | 30 | — | | Funk Wav Bounces Vol. 1 |
| "Good Guy" (Eminem featuring Jessie Reyez) | 2018 | 41 | 46 | — | — | 59 | 67 | — | 32 | RIAA: Gold; ARIA: Gold | Kamikaze |
| "Nice Guy" (with Eminem) | 2018 | 53 | 48 | — | — | 82 | 65 | — | 31 | ARIA: Gold | Kamikaze |
| "Coffin" (featuring Eminem) | 2020 | 98 | — | 25 | 78 | — | — | — | — | MC: Gold | Before Love Came to Kill Us |
"—" denotes items which were not released in that country or failed to chart.

== Guest appearances ==
List of non-single guest appearances, with other performing artists, showing year released and album name
| Title | Year | Other artist(s) | Album |
|---|---|---|---|
| "Lonely" | 2016 | Arin Ray | Phases (EP) |
| "Un Vuelo a La" | 2017 | Romeo Santos | Golden |
| "Sacrifice" | 2018 | Black Atlass | Fifty Shades Freed |
| "Pretending" | 2018 | A Boogie wit da Hoodie | The International Artist |
| "Wherever You Go" | 2018 | Jonas Blue | Blue |
| "Courtside" | 2020 | Dvsn | A Muse in Her Feelings |
| "Count The People" | 2020 | Jacob Collier, T-Pain | Djesse Vol. 3 |
| "Love You Fuck You" | 2020 | Lil Wayne | Funeral (Deluxe Edition) |
| "More than I Should" | 2022 | Kehlani | Blue Water Road |
| "Perfect" | 2023 | Sam Smith | Gloria |
| "Gimme" | 2023 | Sam Smith, Koffee | Gloria |
| "No Boo" | 2025 | JID | God Does Like Ugly |

== Songwriting credits ==
| Title | Year | Artist(s) | Album | Written with |
|---|---|---|---|---|
| "Faking It" | 2017 | Calvin Harris featuring Kehlani and Lil Yachty | Funk Wav Bounces Vol. 1 | Adam Wiles; Miles McCollum |
| "One Kiss" | 2018 | Calvin Harris and Dua Lipa | 96 Months | Adam Wiles; Dua Lipa |
| "Promises" | 2018 | Calvin Harris and Sam Smith | Love Goes and 96 Months | Adam Wiles; Samuel Smith |
| "Slow Down" | 2018 | Normani and Calvin Harris | Normani x Calvin Harris | Normani Hamilton; Adam Wiles |
| "Daddy Knows" | 2019 | Dave East featuring Ash Leone | Survival | Dave Brewster Jr.; Christopher Ruelas; Shaun Thomas; Jahmal Gwin |
| "Call Me Human" | 2019 | Godfather of Harlem featuring French Montana and Skip Marley | Non-album single | Skip Marley; Darius Ginn Jr.; Mario K. Jefferson; Georgia Ku; JT Roach; Akil King; Jaramye Daniels; Kyle Owens; Betty Wright |
| "Passcode" | 2020 | Jannine Weigel | Non-album single | Jannine Weigel; John Oommen; Tommy Brown; Steven Franks |
| "Where Do We Come From?" | 2020 | Paul Epworth featuring Ishmael and Elle Yaya | Voyager | Paul Epworth; Joshua Ishmael Logan; Nikolaj Torp Larsen |
| "Love Me, Leave Me" | 2021 | Casey Bishop | Non-album single | Chris Braide |
| "Potion" | 2022 | Calvin Harris with Dua Lipa and Young Thug | Funk Wav Bounces Vol. 2 | Adam Wiles; Dua Lipa; Jeffery Williams; Maneesh Bidaye |
| "New to You" | 2022 | Calvin Harris with Normani, Tinashe, and Offset | Funk Wav Bounces Vol. 2 | Adam Wiles; Normani Hamilton; Tinashe Kachingwe; Kiari Cephus |
| "Body Moving" | 2023 | Eliza Rose and Calvin Harris | 96 Months | Eliza Rose; Adam Wiles |
| "I'm Not Here to Make Friends" | 2023 | Sam Smith | Gloria | Samuel Smith; James Napier; Mikkel S. Eriksen; Tor Erik Hermansen |
| "Love Me" | 2023 | Steve Aoki and Phem | Non-album single | Steve Aoki; Olivia Marsico |
| "Moonlit Floor (Kiss Me)" | 2024 | Lisa | Alter Ego | Ryan Williamson; Matt Slocum |
| "Complicated" | 2026 | Kelly Rowland featuring Method Man and Plies | Non-album single | Kelly Rowland; Clifford Smith Jr.; Algernod Washington; Jack Dine |
