= Bea Miller discography =

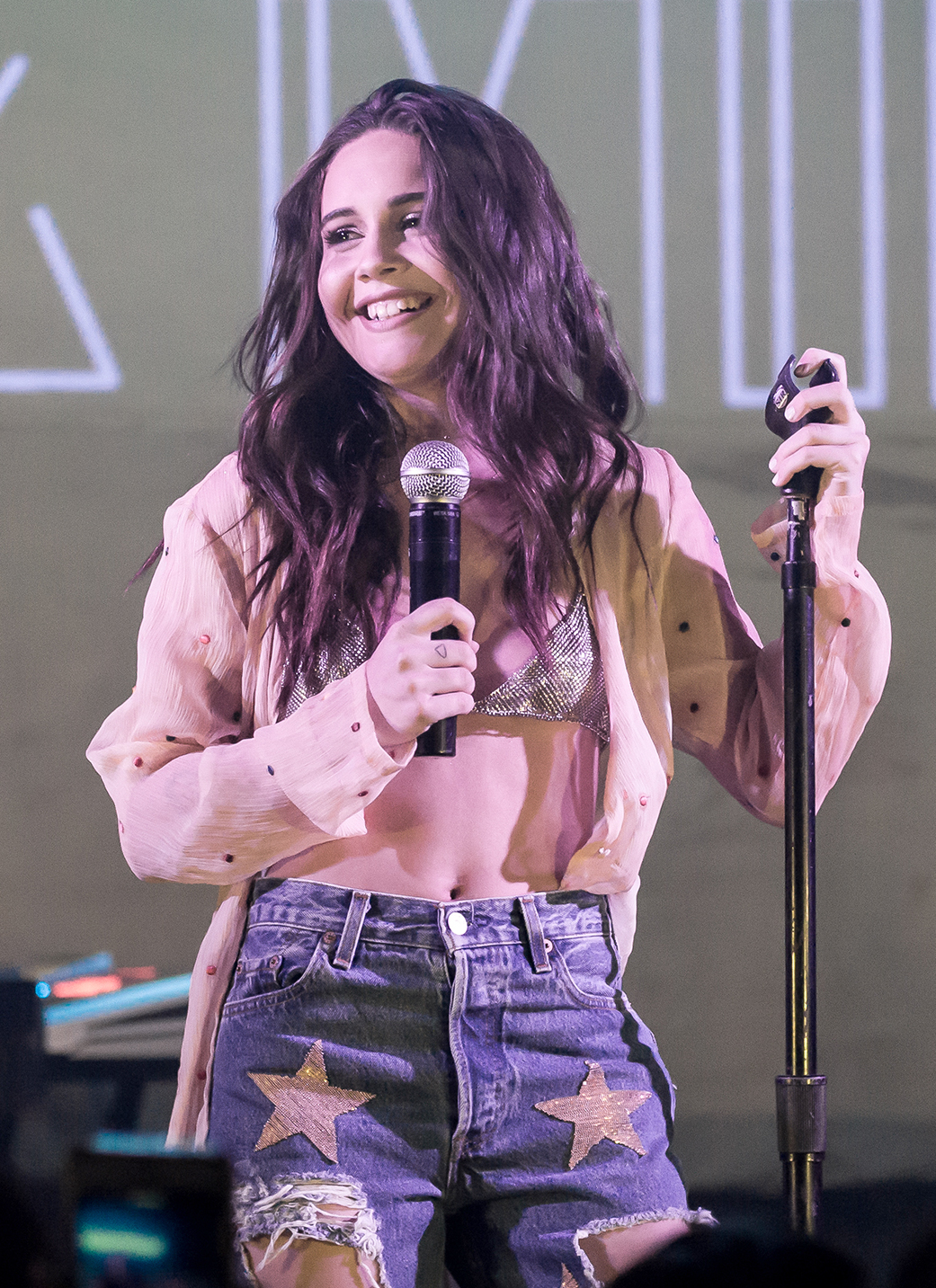
- Studio albums: 3
- EPs: 5
- Live albums: 3
- Compilation albums: 3
- Singles: 17

This is the discography for American pop rock singer Bea Miller.

== Albums ==
List of studio albums, with selected details, chart positions
Title	Album details	Peak chart positions
Title	Album details	US
Not an Apology	Release: July 24, 2015; Label: Syco, Hollywood; Formats: CD, digital download	7
Aurora	Release: February 23, 2018; Label: Hollywood; Formats: CD, LP, digital download	— (Note: "Aurora" did not chart on the Billboard 200, but did peak at number 82 on the Top Current Albums chart.)
Mr. Peaked in High School	Released: September 18, 2026; Label: Annika Productions, Republic; Formats: CD, LP, digital download	—
"—" denotes a recording that did not chart.

== Extended plays ==
List of EPs, with selected details, chart positions
Title	EP details	Peak chart positions
Title	EP details	US
Young Blood	Released: April 22, 2014; Label: Syco, Hollywood; Format: Digital download, streaming	64
Chapter One: Blue	Released: February 24, 2017; Label: Hollywood; Format: Digital download, streaming	—
Chapter Two: Red	Released: June 2, 2017; Label: Hollywood; Format: Digital download, streaming	—
Chapter Three: Yellow	Released: October 6, 2017; Label: Hollywood; Format: Digital download, streaming	—
Elated!	Released: October 23, 2020; Label: Hollywood; Formats: LP, digital download, streaming	—
"—" denotes a recording that did not chart or was not released in that territory.

== Compilations ==
List of compilations, with selected details
Title	Compilation details
Quarantine	Released: September 4, 2020; Label: Universal; Formats: Streaming
Sad Boy Hours	Released: September 18, 2020; Label: Universal; Formats: Streaming
Lust	Released: September 25, 2020; Label: Universal; Formats: Streaming

== Singles ==
=== As lead artist ===
List of singles as lead artist, with selected chart positions and certifications, showing year released and album name
Title	Year	Peak chart positions			Certifications	Album
Title	Year	US	US Pop	NZ Hot	Certifications	Album
"Young Blood" (Note: "Young Blood" and "Fire n Gold" are also included on the Young Blood EP.)	2014	— (Note: "Young Blood" did not chart on the Billboard Hot 100, though did peak at number five on the Bubbling Under Hot 100 Singles chart.)	40	—	RIAA: Gold	Young Blood
"Fire n Gold"	2015	78	— (Note: "Fire N Gold" did not chart on the Billboard Mainstream Top 40 chart, but did peak at number 13 on the Pop Digital Song Sales chart.)	—	RIAA: Platinum	Not an Apology
"Force of Nature"	2015	—	—	—		Not an Apology
"Yes Girl"	2016	—	— (Note: "Yes Girl" did not chart on the Billboard Mainstream Top 40 chart, but did peak at number 44 on the Pop Digital Song Sales chart.)	—		Non-album single
"Like That"	2017	—	—	—	RIAA: Gold	Aurora
"S.L.U.T." (Note: "S.L.U.T." is also included on the Chapter Three: Yellow EP.)	2017	—	—	—		Aurora
"It's Not U It's Me" (with 6lack)	2019	—	—	38		Non-album single
"Feel Something" (Note: "Feel Something" is also included on the compilation EP Sad Boy Hours.)	2019	—	—	—	MC: Gold; RIAA: Gold	Quarantine
"Feels like Home" (with Jessie Reyez)	2019	—	—	—		Lust
"Never Gonna Like You" (with Snakehips)	2019	—	—	34		Lust
"That Bitch"	2019	—	—	—		Non-album single
"Wisdom Teeth"	2020	—	—	—		Elated!
"Playground"	2021	—	—	—		Arcane League of Legends
"Lonely Bitch"	2023	—	—	—		Non-album singles
"Cynical"	2023	—	—	—		Non-album singles
"Jealous of My Friends"	2023	—	—	—		Non-album singles
"This Call Is Coming from Inside the House"	2023	—	—	—		Non-album singles
"Gauche"	2023	—	—	—		Non-album singles
"Depressed on the Internet"	2026	—	—	—		Mr. Peaked in High School
"Born to Lose"	2026	—	—	—		Mr. Peaked in High School
"Drunk Enough"	2026	—	—	—		Mr. Peaked in High School
"—" denotes a recording that did not chart or was not released in that territory.

=== As featured artist ===
List of singles as featured artist, with selected chart positions and certifications, showing year released and album name
Title	Year	Peak chart positions								Certifications	Album
Title	Year	US Bub.	AUS	BEL (WA) Tip	CAN	DEN	NOR	SWE	UK	Certifications	Album
"I Wanna Know" (NOTD featuring Bea Miller)	2018	23	18	14	69	40	18	28	46	RIAA: Platinum; ARIA: 4× Platinum; BPI: Gold; GLF: Platinum; IFPI DEN: Gold; MC: 2× Platinum	Non-album single
"War (En Vivo)" (Paty Cantú featuring Bea Miller)	2018	—	—	—	—	—	—	—	—		#333
"Waste of Time" (Lostboycrow featuring Bea Miller)	2018	—	—	—	—	—	—	—	—		Santa Fe
"Comethru" (Jeremy Zucker featuring Bea Miller)	2019	—	—	—	—	—	—	—	—	RIAA: Platinum	Summer
"The Baddest" (K/DA featuring Bea Miller, (G)I-dle and Wolftyla)	2020	—	—	—	—	—	—	—	—		All Out
"Hate U Cuz I Don't" (Louis the Child featuring Bea Miller)	2021	—	—	—	—	—	—	—	—		Euphoria
"Yours" (Sueco featuring Bea Miller)	2023	—	—	—	—	—	—	—	—		Non-album single
"Out of Time" (Zedd featuring Bea Miller)	2024	—	—	—	—	—	—	—	—		Telos
"—" denotes a recording that did not chart or was not released in that territory.

== Promotional singles ==
List of promotional singles, showing year released and album name
Title	Year	Album
"Open Your Eyes"	2014	Non-album song
"Brand New Eyes"	2017	Wonder

== Guest appearances ==
List of non-single guest appearances, showing other performing artists, year released and album name
Title	Year	Other artist(s)	Album
"Roar"	2015	Boyce Avenue	Cover Sessions, Vol. 3
"We Can't Stop"	2015	Boyce Avenue	Cover Sessions, Vol. 3
"See You Again"	2017	Boyce Avenue	Cover Sessions, Vol. 4
"Photograph"	2017	Boyce Avenue	Cover Sessions, Vol. 4
"Be My Baby"	2017	None	Dirty Dancing

== Music videos ==
List of music videos as lead and featured artist, showing directors
Title	Year	Other artist(s)	Director	Ref.
As lead artist
"Open Your Eyes"	2014	None	Unknown	
"Young Blood"	2014	None	Mark Pellington	
"Fire n Gold"	2015	None	Black Coffee	
"Yes Girl"	2016	None	Aya Tanimura	
"Song Like You"	2017	None	Kyle Cogan	
"Burning Bridges"	2017	None	Kyle Cogan	
"Be My Baby"	2017	None	Brazil & Kalyne Lionheart	
"I Can't Breathe"	2017	None	Miles & AJ	
"Like That"	2017	None	Miles & AJ	
"Buy Me Diamonds"	2017	None	Miles & AJ	
"Warmer"	2017	None	Miles & AJ	
"Brand New Eyes"	2017	None	Unknown	
"Repercussions"	2017	None	Miles & AJ	
"To the Grave"	2017	Mike Stud	Miles & AJ	
"S.L.U.T."	2018	None	Miles & AJ	
"It's Not U It's Me"	2019	6lack	Pilar Zeta & Jimmy Edgar	
"Feel Something"	2019	None	Pilar Zeta	
"Feels Like Home"	2019	Jessie Reyez	Phillip Soulliere	
"Never Gonna Like You"	2019	Snakehips	Emmet Kilmer & Bea Miller	
"Wisdom Teeth"	2020	None	Gina "Gizella" Manning	
"Making Bad Decisions"	2020	None	Gina "Gizella" Manning	
"Hallelujah"	2020	None	Gina "Gizella" Manning	
"Forever Is a Lie"	2020	None	Gina "Gizella" Manning	
"Feel Something Different"	2020	Aminé	Gina "Gizella" Manning	
"I Never Wanna Die"	2020	None	Gina "Gizella" Manning	
"Self Crucify"	2020	None	Gina "Gizella" Manning	
"Welcome to the Playground"	2021	None	Unknown	
As featured artist
"War (En Vivo)"	2017	Paty Cantú	Unknown	
"I Wanna Know"	2017	NOTD	Michael Baldwin	
