= Hennedub =

Danish music producer

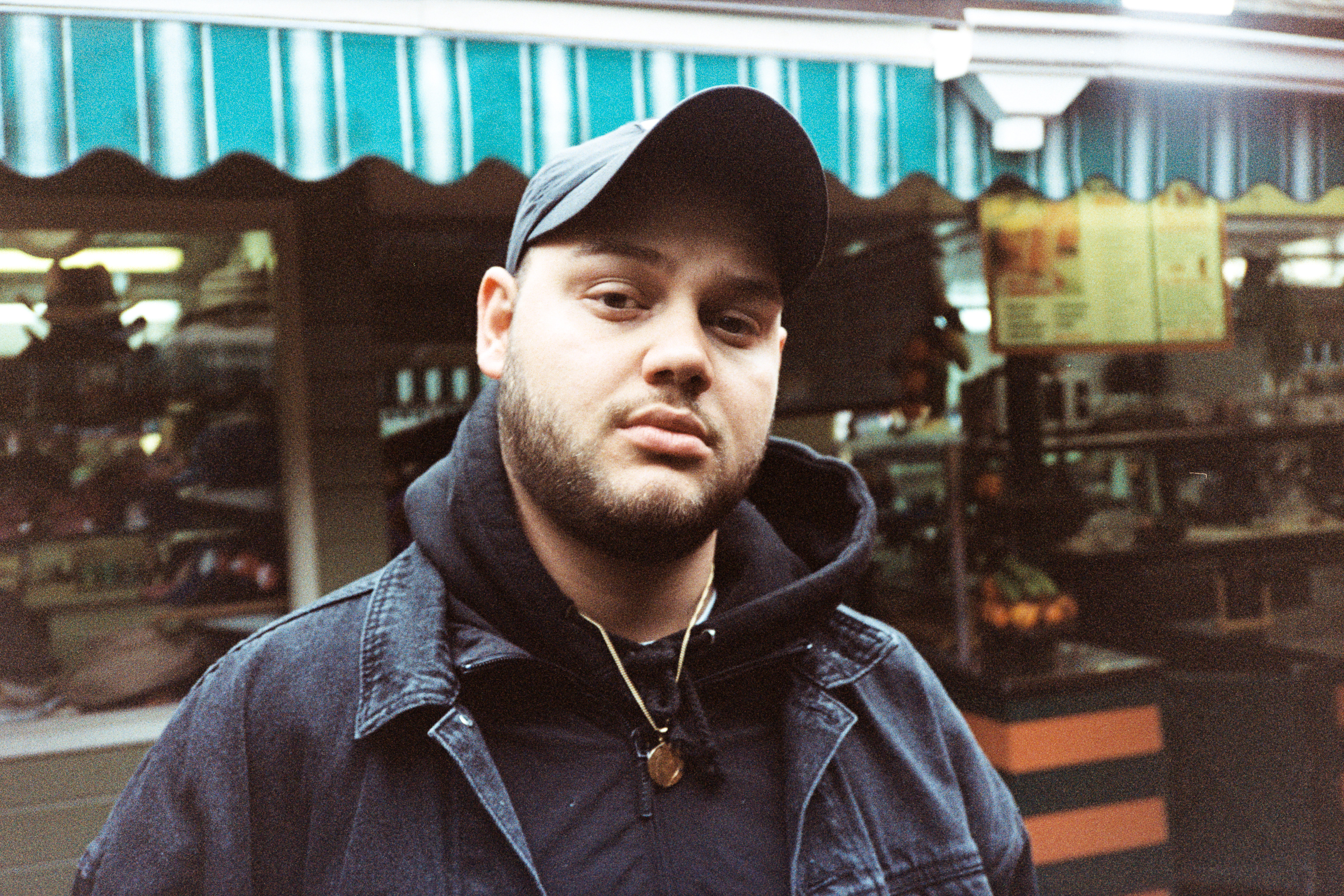
- Hennedub in L.A.
- Born: Henrik Bryld Wolsing; 1 June 1994 (age 31); Ballerup, Denmark

Henrik Bryld Wolsing, better known as Hennedub, is a Danish music producer. Hennedub is best known for his work with Gilli, Kesi, and Lukas Graham, and also releases music in his own name.

== Career ==
Hennedub won the 2017 Danish Music Awards prize for Best Producer. That year he produced “Kesi 'Mamacita’”, which was named one of the top ten Hip Hop songs produced by Danish musicians of the 2010s by SoundVenue, an article that also noted his track from the same decade “Consigliere”. In 2017 he moved from Denmark to the United States, and became based in Los Angeles. He has partnered with musicians on his original music including Kesi. and Jessie Reyez. His work with Jessie Reyez on the album Being Human in Public, saw him nominated for a Grammy Award.

== Discography ==
Year	Artist	Album	Song	Role	Certifications
2015	Gilli	Orale	Orale	Producer	Platinum (DK)
2016	Gilli	Helwa	Helwa	Producer	Platinum (DK)
2016	Gilli	Tidligt Op	Tidligt Op	Producer	2× Platinum (DK)
2016	Christopher	Closer	I Won't Let You Down	Producer	Platinum (DK)
2016	Brandon Beal	Truth	Golden	Producer	2× Platinum (DK); Platinum (NO)
2017	Kesi	Følelsen	Følelsen	Producer	Platinum (DK)
2017	Kesi	God Dag	God dag	Producer	Platinum (DK)
2017	KESI	Mamacita	Mamacita feat. Benny Jamz	Producer	2× Platinum (DK)
2017	Nico & Vinz	Elephant In The Room	Listen	Producer	
2017	Nico & Vinz	Elephant In The Room	So Bad	Producer	
2017	Gilli	Habibi Aiwa	Habibi Aiwa	Producer	2× Platinum (DK)
2017	Gilli	La Varrio	La Varrio (El Barrio)	Producer	Platinum (DK)
2017	Gilli	Rica	Rica feat. KESI & SIVAS	Producer	3× Platinum (DK)
2017	Hedegaard	That's Me	That's Me	Producer	
2017	Basim	Comme çi comme ça	Comme ci comme ça	Producer	Platinum (DK)
2018	Kesi	Ligesom Mig	Ligesom Mig	Producer	Platinum(DK)
2018	Kesi	Kom Over	Kom Over	Producer	2× Platinum(DK)
2018	Gilli	Frero	Frero	Producer	Gold (DK)
2018	Gilli	Mon P'tit Loup	Mon P'tit Loup	Producer	Gold (DK)
2018	Hennedub	Holder Fast	Holder Fast ft. Gilli & Lukas Graham	Producer & Songwriter	Platinum (DK)
2018	Hennedub	Umage	Umage ft. Kesi & Skinz	Producer & Songwriter	Gold(DK)
2018	Kesi	Ekstra	Ekstra	Producer	Gold(DK)
2018	Kesi, Gilli	Su Casa	Su Casa	Producer	Gold (DK)
2018	Jessie Reyez	Being Human in Public	Imported feat. JRM	Producer	
2018	Lukas Graham	3 (The Purple Album)	Not A Damn Thing Changed	Producer	Platinum (DK)
2019	Jessie Reyez	Before Love Came to Kill Us	Imported (with 6LACK)	Producer	Platinum (US)
2020	Lukas Graham	Love Songs	Love Songs	Producer	
2020	Citybois	Bois Forever	Sol Over København feat. Kesi	Producer	Gold (DK)
2020	Kesi feat. Hennedub	BO4L	Tilbage	Producer & Singer	Gold (DK)
2020	Kesi	BO4L	Blå Himmel feat. Hans Philip	Producer	

=== Albums ===
Year	Artist	Title	Peak chart positions
Year	Artist	Title	DEN
2020	Kesi	BO4L	1

=== EPs ===
Year	Artist	Title	Peak chart positions
Year	Artist	Title	DEN
2019	Kesi	888	2

== Awards and nominations ==
Year	Award	Category	Nominee	Result
2016	GAFFA-Prisen	Pop Release of the Year	Ingen Andre – TopGunn	Nominated
2016	Danish Deejay Awards	Danish Deejay Favorite	6 Liter – TopGunn	Nominated
2016	Danish Deejay Awards	Danish Deejay Favorite	Orale – Gilli	Nominated
2016	Danish Club Award	Producer of the Year	Hennedub (Himself)	Nominated
2016	Danish Music Awards	Hit of the Year	Golden – Brandon Beal featuring Lukas Graham	Nominated
2016	Danish Music Awards	Producer of the Year	Hennedub (Himself)	Nominated
2017	The Voice 17	Producer of the Year	Hennedub (Himself)	Nominated
2017	Danish Club Awards	Producer of the Year	Hennedub (Himself)	Nominated
2017	Danish Music Awards	Danish Release of the Year	Mamacita – Kesi featuring Benny Jamz	Nominated
2017	Danish Music Awards	Danish Release of the Year	Rica – Gilli featuring Kesi and Sivas	Won
2017	Danish Music Awards	Hit of the Year	Rica – Gilli featuring Kesi and Sivas	Nominated
2017	Danish Music Awards	Hit of the Year	Habibi Aiwa – Gilli	Nominated
2017	Danish Music Awards	Hit of the Year	Helwa – Gilli	Nominated
2017	Danish Music Awards	Producer of the Year	Hennedub (Himself)	Won
2017	Steppeulven	Producer of the Year	Hennedub (Himself)	Won
2017	Steppeulven	Song of the Year	Habibi Aiwa – Gilli	Won
2018	The Voice 18	Producer of the Year	Hennedub (Himself)	Won
2019	The Voice 19	Producer of the Year	Hennedub (Himself)	Won
2020	The Voice 20	Producer of the Year	Hennedub (Himself)	Nominated
