= Björn Djupström =

Swedish songwriter and producer

Björn Djupström (born 25 February 1982 in Lidköping) is a Swedish songwriter and producer, currently a member of the songwriting duo Priest and the Beast. He has written songs for artists such as Pitbull, J-Lo, Enrique Iglesias, Nicki Minaj and Marc Anthony.

Djupström studied at the Writers Academy of Sweden. He subsequently wrote songs for Swedish artist Loreen, including "My Heart is Refusing me" which sold 2× Platinum in Sweden.

Between 2011 and 2014, Djupström collaborated with producer and songwriter RedOne and co-wrote several songs, including "Live it up" with Jennifer Lopez and Pitbull, "C’est La Vie" with Khaled and "Vivir Mi Vida" with Marc Anthony. The latter song won a Latin Grammy Award in 2013 for Record of the Year and holds the record for the second-longest run inside the top-five in the Billboard Latin Songs, with 51 weeks. The song certified 16× Platinum US (Latin), 2× Platinum in Mexico and certified Gold in Italy and Spain. Other songs co-written by Djupström include Whip it by Nicki Minaj and "I Like How It Feels" by Enrique Iglesias and Pitbull.

The songwriting duo Priest and the Beast released Jessie Reyez first single "Figures* and "Like it Like it" by Marcus & Martinus feat. Silentó together.

== Discography ==
- Like it Like it by Marcus & Martinus feat. Silento
- Figures by Jessie Reyez
- C’est la vie by Khaled

No.4 in the ‘French Singles chart’ and no.1 in Czech Republics ‘Radio Top 100’.

- Vivir Mi Vida by Marc Anthony

Latin Grammy Award in 2013 for ‘Record of the Year’ and holds the record for the second-longest run inside the top-five in the Billboard Latin Songs, with 51 weeks.

· Certified 16× Platinum US(Latin) and 2× Platinum in Mexico. Certified Gold in Italy and Spain.

- I Like How It Feels by Enrique Iglesias (ft. Pitbull)

Peaked position 1 in US Billboards ‘Hot Dance Club Songs’ chart and on ‘Spanish Airplay Chart’

· Certified 2× Platinum in Canada. 1× Platinum in Australia. Platinum in Mexico.

- La La Love by Ivi Adamou

Peaked position 1 on ‘Swedish Airplay chart’. The song represented Cyprus in Eurovision Song Contest 2012.

· Certified 2× Platinum in Sweden.

- Live it up by Jennifer Lopez ft. Pitbull

Peaked position 1 on US billboards ‘Hot Dance Club Songs’ chart.

· Certified Platinum in Venezuela. Gold in Canada and Australia.

- Whip it by Nicki Minaj

Positioned no.23 in the US billboard ‘Bubbling Under Hot 100 Singles’ chart.

- Next to you by Austin Mahone
- You don't eat by Jadakiss feat. P Diddy
- Arse like that by Dizzee Rascal feat. Sean Kingston
- My Heart Is Refusing Me by Loreen

· Certified 2× Platinum in Sweden.

- Sidewalk by Loreen
- Everytime by Loreen
- Me 4 U by OMI

US ‘Billboard 200’ it peaked position 51, and position 9 in ‘Swedish Album top list’.

- Spread a little love by Havana Brown
- Love life by John Mamann

The track has charted on French, Belgian and Swedish Singles Chart.

- Champion by Clemens

The song has peaked to number 1 on the Danish Singles Chart.

- Movin’ by Mohombi
- Take me home by Midnight Red

Peaked position 3 on ‘Spanish Charts’.

- Hell yeah by Midnight Red
- Broken parts by Måns Zelmerlöw
- No gravity by Mads Langer
