= Kiddo (EP) =

EP by Jessie Reyez
- Released: April 21, 2017
- Genre: R&B
- Length: 19:35
- Label: FMLY; Republic
- Producer: Tim Suby (also exec.); Jahaan Sweet; Will Idap; Priest and the Beast

Jessie Reyez chronology
Kiddo (2017)	Being Human in Public (2018)

Singles from Kiddo
- 1. "Figures" Released: August 26, 2016; 2. "Shutter Island" Released: January 23, 2017; 3. "Gatekeeper" Released: April 21, 2017; 4. "Great One" Released: September 8, 2017

Professional ratings
Review scores
Source	Rating
Exclaim!	8/10

Kiddo is the debut extended play by Canadian singer-songwriter Jessie Reyez. It was released on April 21, 2017, by FMLY and Republic Records. The EP was supported by two singles, "Figures" and "Shutter Island". The third single, "Gatekeeper", was released alongside a short film. The EP peaked at No. 83 on the Canadian Albums Chart and was nominated for R&B/Soul Recording of the Year at the 2018 Juno Awards.

== Release ==
Her first single, "Figures", was premiered by Zane Lowe on Beats 1 radio, alongside its music video. "Figures" peaked at number 58 on the Canadian Hot 100 in 2017. It was certified double platinum by Music Canada, and Gold by the RIAA. "Shutter Island" was released as the second single of the EP. In April 2017, Reyez released Kiddo. The third single "Gatekeeper" was released alongside a short film. "Gatekeeper" addressed sexism and exploitation in the music industry and was based on her experience with music producer Noel "Detail" Fisher, who was accused of sexual misconduct by multiple women. "Great One" was released as the fourth single from the EP.

== Reception ==
Kiddo peaked at No. 83 on the Canadian Album Chart. Kiddo was placed on the Long List of the 2017 Polaris Music Prize and lead to four nominations at the 2018 Juno Awards (R&B/Soul Recording of the Year, Breakthrough Artist, Video of the Year (for Gatekeeper), and Juno Fan Choice Award), where she won Breakthrough Artist. She also received two 2017 iHeartRadio Much Music Video Awards nominations for Best New Canadian Artist and Fan Fave Video for "Shutter Island". She was also nominated for two 2018 MTV Music Video Awards, including Push Artist of the Year and Video With A Message (for "Gatekeeper"). Due to the EP, Billboard named Reyez one of the "10 Hip-Hop and R&B Artists to Watch in 2018".

== Track listing ==
No.	Title	Writer(s)	Length
1.	"Fuck It"	Jessie Reyez; Tim Suby	3:05
2.	"Shutter Island"	Jessie Reyez; Tim Suby	3:07
3.	"Blue Ribbon" (featuring Tim Suby)	Jessie Reyez; Tim Suby	2:35
4.	"Figures"	Jessie Reyez; Shy Carter; Björn Djupström; Tobias Frelin	4:00
5.	"Gatekeeper"	Jessie Reyez; William Larsen	3:14
6.	"Colombian King & Queen"		0:43
7.	"Great One"	Jessie Reyez; Jahaan Sweet	2:49
Total length:			19:35

== Charts ==
Chart (2017)	Peak position
Canadian Albums (Billboard)	83
US R&B Album Sales (Billboard)	23
