= Feel Something (Bea Miller song) =

2019 single by Bea Miller

Single by Bea Miller

from the EP Quarantine and Sad Boy Hours
- Released: June 21, 2019
- Genre: Futurepop
- Length: 3:00
- Label: Hollywood
- Songwriters: Beatrice Miller; Mike Sabath; Kennedi Lykken; Justin Tranter
- Producer: Mike Sabath

Bea Miller singles chronology
"Comethru" (2019)	"Feel Something" (2019)	"Feels Like Home" (2019)

Music video
- "Feel Something" on YouTube

"Feel Something" (stylized in all lowercase) is a song by American singer Bea Miller. The single was released by Hollywood Records on June 21, 2019, following the release of previous single "It's Not U, It's Me" with 6LACK. In 2020, the song was later included on the compilation EPs Quarantine, on September 4, and Sad Boy Hours, on September 18. It was also included on the vinyl release of Miller's EP Elated.

After nearly a year of being released, the song started gaining traction on the social media platform, TikTok, after being included in a fan-made mashup along with the song "Still Don't Know My Name" by British musician Labrinth. Consequently, the song later received playlist support on streaming services such as Apple Music and Spotify, with the song being added to the biggest playlist on the latter's platform, "Today's Top Hits". "Feel Something" was serviced to American Top 40 and hot adult contemporary radios on September 15, 2020.

== Promotion ==
On June 18, 2019, Miller announced the song's release date. On June 20, 2019, Miller announced that the song would be released at midnight and revealed the song's official cover art. The song officially impacted American top 40 and hot adult contemporary radios on September 15, 2020.

== Composition and lyrics ==
"Feel Something" is a futurepop song written by Miller, Mike Sabath, Kennedi Lykken and Justin Tranter, and produced by Mike Sabath. Miller talked about the song: "When you're experiencing pain of any kind, all you want is for it to go away. But weirdly that pain is kind of what makes you feel like a real person, so when nothing is going wrong but it's also not going right and you’re just in the middle, you feel empty. And that's almost worse. That's what I wrote this song about."

== Credits and personnel ==
Credits adapted from Tidal.

- Bea Miller – composer, lyricist
- Mike Sabath – composer, lyricist, producer, mixer, studio personnel
- Justin Tranter – composer, lyricist
- Kennedi Lykken – composer, lyricist
- Will Quinnell – assistant recording engineer, studio personnel

== Certifications ==
Region	Certification	Certified units/sales
Brazil (Pro-Música Brasil)	2× Platinum	80,000^{‡}
Canada (Music Canada)	Gold	40,000^{‡}
Mexico (AMPROFON)	Gold	30,000^{‡}
New Zealand (RMNZ)	Gold	15,000^{‡}
Poland (ZPAV)	Gold	25,000^{‡}
United States (RIAA)	Gold	500,000^{‡}
^{‡} Sales+streaming figures based on certification alone.

== Release history ==
Region	Date	Format	Label	Ref.
Various	June 21, 2019	Digital download, streaming	Hollywood	
United States	September 14, 2020	Hot/Modern/AC radio	Hollywood	
United States	September 15, 2020	Contemporary hit radio	Hollywood	
