= Coffin (song) =

2020 song by Jessie Reyez

Song by Jessie Reyez featuring Eminem

from the album Before Love Came to Kill Us
- Released: March 27, 2020
- Genre: Pop; hip hop; R&B
- Length: 4:22.
- Label: FMLY; Island
- Songwriters: Jessie Reyez; Marshall Mathers; Andre Robertson; Tobias Frelin
- Producers: Bizness Boi; Tobias Frelin; Eminem (add.)

"Coffin" is a song by Canadian singer-songwriter Jessie Reyez featuring American rapper Eminem released from her debut full-length studio album Before Love Came to Kill Us on March 27, 2020, via FMLY/Island Records. The track was written by Reyez and Eminem, alongside producers Bizness Boi and Tobias Frelin (with additional production credits going to Eminem). The song has managed to chart in Canada despite not being a single.

In the spirit of their previous collaborations "Good Guy" and "Nice Guy" from Eminem's Kamikaze (2018), the song is about another complicated relationship.

== Personnel ==
- Jessie Reyez – main artist, vocals, songwriter
- Marshall Mathers – featured artist, vocals, additional producer, songwriter
- Tobias "Priest" Frelin – bass guitar, producer, songwriter
- Andre Robertson – programming, producer, songwriter
- Luis Resto – additional keyboards
- Joe Strange – recording
- Karl Wingate – recording
- Mike Strange – recording
- Spencer "Moose" Muscio – recording
- Tony Campana – recording
- Riley Bell – mixing
- Mike Bozzi – mastering

== Charts ==
Chart (2020)	Peak position
Canada Hot 100 (Billboard)	98

== Certifications ==
Certifications and sales for "Coffin"
Region	Certification	Certified units/sales
Canada (Music Canada)	Gold	40,000^{‡}
^{‡} Sales+streaming figures based on certification alone.
