= Yes Girl =

Single by Bea Miller
- Released: May 20, 2016
- Recorded: 2016
- Genre: Pop rock
- Length: 3:51
- Label: Hollywood
- Songwriters: Warren Felder; Ilsey Juber; Bea Miller; Andrew Wansel
- Producers: Pop & Oak; Trevorious; Zaire Koalo

Bea Miller singles chronology
"Force of Nature" (2015)	"Yes Girl" (2016)	"Song Like You" (2017)

"Yes Girl" (stylized in all lowercase) is a song by American singer Bea Miller. It was released on May 20, 2016 via Hollywood Records. The track was written by Miller herself, Ilsey Juber, and American production team Pop & Oak, who also produced the song.

== Composition ==
"I called the A&R from my label and said, ‘This song completely captures how I feel lyrically and musically. It has live drums, live bass and live guitar, and also has programmed instruments, and it melds together evenly and fluidly.' I knew instantaneously that this was the song I was looking for."

— Miller talking about "Yes Girl".

The song was written by Miller herself, Ilsey Juber and American production team Pop & Oak, who also produced the song. Co-production is handled by Treviorious and Zaire Koalo. Is described as a "moody pop rock anthem". With the song, Miller wanted to combine a live aspect, live instruments, with programmed instruments, "in a way that nobody really does in pop music, at least not right now," said during a late call on Fuse. "I wanted to come up with something that was really original and true to me. Oak was the first person, out of all the producers I’ve worked with, to capture that immediately. It was this whole new feeling", she continued. About the inspiration for the song, she told People, "I had a lot of people in my life telling me what I needed to be doing and what direction I need to be going in. I was just getting really stressed out, and I found myself saying yes to a lot of things that I really didn't want to. There's that saying of being a Yes Man, and I was kind of being a Yes Girl. I wrote this song to remind myself that I can stand up for myself and be passionate about things and have an opinion – and that it's not wrong, I figured out if I put happiness in myself, that, if it comes from myself, I can be happy. If I tell myself I can accomplish things, I can do them. I'm excited for my fans to see how much I've grown."

== Commercial performance ==
The song debuted at No. 22 on the Billboard Twitter Top Tracks chart, making it her third song to chart there along "Fire n Gold" and "Force of Nature".

== Music video ==
A lyric video was uploaded on August 5, 2016 on her official Vevo channel. The official music video, directed by Aya Tanimura, was premiered on a special event in Los Angeles, California on August 24, 2016 and on Miller's official Vevo channel on August 25.

== Track listing ==
- Digital download
1. "Yes Girl" – 3:51

== Release history ==
Region	Date	Format	Label	Ref.
Various	May 20, 2016	Digital download	Hollywood	
