= Rush (Lewis Capaldi song) =

Single by Lewis Capaldi featuring Jessie Reyez
- Released: 23 February 2018
- Recorded: 2017
- Length: 3:18
- Label: Virgin

Lewis Capaldi singles chronology
| "Fade" (2017) | "Rush" (2018) | "Tough" (2018) |

Jessie Reyez singles chronology
| "Cotton Candy" (2017) | "Rush" (2018) | "Figures, a Reprise" (2018) |

"Rush" is a song by Scottish singer-songwriter Lewis Capaldi featuring vocals from Canadian singer and songwriter Jessie Reyez. It was released as a digital download on 23 February 2018 via Virgin Records. The song peaked at number 74 on the Scottish Singles Chart.

== Music video ==
A music video to accompany the release of "Rush" was first released onto YouTube on 8 March 2018 at a total length of four minutes and two seconds.

== Charts ==
Chart performance for "Rush"
| Chart (2018) | Peak position |
|---|---|
| Scotland Singles (OCC) | 74 |

== Certifications ==
Certifications for "Rush"
| Region | Certification | Certified units/sales |
|---|---|---|
| Australia (ARIA) | Gold | 35,000^{‡} |
| United Kingdom (BPI) | Gold | 400,000^{‡} |
^{‡} Sales+streaming figures based on certification alone.

== Release history ==
Release history and formats for "Rush"
| Region | Date | Format | Label |
|---|---|---|---|
| United Kingdom | 23 February 2018 | Digital download | Virgin |
