= Before Love Came to Kill Us =

Studio album by Jessie Reyez
- Released: March 27, 2020
- Genres: Pop; hip hop; R&B
- Length: 46:52
- Labels: FMLY; Island
- Producers: Jessy Aaron; Fred Ball; Bizness Boi; Rogét Chahayed; Alexander Delicata; Björn Djupström; Eminem; Tobias Frelin; Andre Harris; Hennedub; Blvk Jvck; Kamo; Lazuli; Mura Masa; The Monarch; P2J; Jessie Reyez; R!o; Tim Suby; Vegyn; YogiTheProducer

Jessie Reyez chronology
Being Human in Public (2018)	Before Love Came to Kill Us (2020)	Yessie (2022)

Singles from Before Love Came to Kill Us
- 1. "Figures" Released: August 26, 2016; 2. "Imported" Released: April 19, 2019; 3. "Love in the Dark" Released: January 23, 2020; 4. "Intruders" Released: June 19, 2020; 5. "Before Love Came to Kill Us" Released: August 7, 2020

Before Love Came to Kill Us is the debut studio album by Canadian singer-songwriter Jessie Reyez. It was released on March 27, 2020, by FMLY and Island Records. The production on the album was handled by multiple producers including Rogét Chahayed, Mura Masa, Hennedub, The Monarch and Bizness Boi among others. The album also features guest appearances by Eminem and 6lack on the standard version and with Rico Nasty, JID, A Boogie wit da Hoodie and Melii on the deluxe versions.

Before Love Came to Kill Us was prefaced with the singles "Figures", "Imported", and "Love in the Dark", and the promotional single "Ankles". The album received generally positive reviews from music critics. A deluxe edition with three additional songs was made available digitally on April 9, 2020. A super deluxe edition of the album was released on September 25, 2020.

== Critical reception ==
Professional ratings
Aggregate scores
Source	Rating
Metacritic	82/100
Review scores
Source	Rating
AllMusic	4/5 stars
Clash	8/10
Exclaim!	9/10
The Guardian	4/5 stars
The Line of Best Fit	9/10
NME	4/5 stars
Pitchfork	6.8/10
The Telegraph	3/5 stars
Tom Hull – on the Web	B+

Before Love Came to Kill Us was met with widespread critical acclaim. At Metacritic, which assigns a normalised rating out of 100 to reviews from mainstream critics, the album received an average score of 82, based on nine reviews.

For AllMusic, Andy Kellman wrote that "Although it's all over the place, Before Love Came to Kill Us radiates conviction from front to back, and is without doubt a true representation of its creator." Exclaim!'s Ryan B. Patrick affirms that the album "has been built to last" and is "one of the better albums in an already interesting 2020." Rhian Daly of NME called it "heart-stoppingly good" and a "beautiful, heart-wrenching debut that sees its creator come good on her early promise." Writing for Clash, Narzra Ahmed complimented Reyez's versatility and adjectived the album "an excellent debut". Kathryn St. Asaph of Pitchfork pointed out that the album's genre range works in a "satisfying" way "not because she whizzes across multiple genres, but because of the skill she displays at each". The singer's uniqueness was praised by The Guardian's Kitty Empire, who labeled the tracks as "largely excellent".

The album was shortlisted for the 2020 Polaris Music Prize, and for the Juno Award for Contemporary R&B/Soul Recording of the Year at the Juno Awards of 2021. For the Polaris Music Prize, which followed a unique format of commissioning filmmakers to make short films inspired by the shortlisted albums due to the COVID-19 pandemic in Canada preventing the staging of a traditional gala, the album's film was directed by Alicia K. Harris.

== Commercial performance ==
Before Love Came to Kill Us debuted at number 13 on the US Billboard 200 chart, earning 27,000 album-equivalent units in its first week. This became Reyez' first US top-twenty debut. On November 21, 2023, the album was certified gold by the Recording Industry Association of America (RIAA) for combined sales and album-equivalent units of over 500,000 units in the United States.

== Track listing ==
Standard edition
No.	Title	Writer(s)	Producer(s)	Length
1.	"Do You Love Her"	Fredrik Ball; Jessica Reyez; Rui Afonso; Tim Suby	Ball; Lazuli^{[a]}; Suby^{[a]}	3:16
2.	"Deaf (Who Are You)"	Reyez; Suby	Suby	2:53
3.	"Intruders"	Akil King; Darius Ginn Jr.; Reyez; John Thomas Roach; Mario Jefferson	R!o; Kamo^{[a]}	3:05
4.	"Coffin" (featuring Eminem)	Andre Robertson; Reyez; Marshall Mathers; Tobias Frelin	Bizness Boi; Frelin; Eminem^{[a]}	4:22
5.	"Ankles"	Alexander Delicata; Andre Davidson; Andrew Harr; Jermaine Jackson; Reyez; Sean Davidson	Blvk Jvck; Delicata^{[a]}; The Monarch^{[a]}	2:49
6.	"Imported" (with 6lack)	Reyez; Henrik Bryld Wolsing; Jaramye Daniels; Ricardo Valentine	Hennedub	3:45
7.	"La Memoria"	Björn Djupström; Reyez; Johann Deterville; Savannah Ré; Tobias Frelin	YogiTheProducer; Djupström^{[b]}; Reyez^{[b]}; Ré^{[c]}; Frelin^{[b]}	3:18
8.	"Same Side"	Reyez; Suby	Suby	3:10
9.	"Roof"	Robertson; Reyez; Richard Isong	Bizness Boi; P2J	1:46
10.	"Dope"	Djupström; Reyez	Djupström	2:38
11.	"Before Love Came to Kill Us (Note: The song was initially titled “Kill Us”.)"	Alexander Crossan; Reyez; Suby	Suby; Reyez; Jessy Aaron^{[a]}; Mura Masa^{[a]}	4:06
12.	"Love in the Dark"	Reyez; Djupström; Suby; Frelin	Suby; Djupström^{[b]}; Frelin^{[b]}	3:59
13.	"I Do"	King; Andre Harris; Ginn Jr.; Jaramye Daniels; Reyez; Jefferson	R!o; Harris^{[a]}; Kamo^{[a]}	3:52
14.	"Figures"	Reyez; Djupström; Shy Carter; Frelin	Djupström; Frelin	3:58
Total length:				46:57

Deluxe edition
No.	Title	Writer(s)	Producer(s)	Length
15.	"Far Away II" (featuring A Boogie wit da Hoodie and JID)	Artist Julius Dubose; Destin Choice Route; Reyez; Rogét Chahayed	Chahayed; Vegyn	3:35
16.	"Ankles" (featuring Rico Nasty and Melii)	Delicata; A. Davidson; Harr; Audrey Ducasse; Jackson; Reyez; Maria-Cecilia Simone Kelly; S. Anderson	Blvk Jvck; Delicata^{[a]}; The Monarch^{[a]}	4:42
17.	"Worth Saving"	Reyez; Suby	Suby	3:24
Total length:				58:38

Target edition bonus tracks
No.	Title	Writer(s)	Producer(s)	Length
15.	"Sugar at Night"			2:57
16.	"No One's in the Room"			4:08
17.	"Far Away"	Reyez; Chahyaed; Vegyn	Chahayed; Vegyn	2:41

Before Love Came to Kill Us+
No.	Title	Writer(s)	Producer(s)	Length
1.	"No One's in the Room"			4:08
2.	"Sugar at Night"			2:57
3.	"Before Love Came to Kill Us"	Alexander Crossan; Reyez; Suby	Suby; Reyez; Jessy Aaron^{[a]}; Mura Masa^{[a]}	4:06
4.	"Roof"	Robertson; Reyez; Richard Isong	Bizness Boi; P2J	1:46
5.	"Coffin" (featuring Eminem)	Andre Robertson; Reyez; Marshall Mathers; Tobias Frelin	Bizness Boi; Frelin; Eminem^{[a]}	4:22
6.	"Worth Saving"	Reyez; Suby	Suby	3:24
7.	"I Do"	King; Andre Harris; Ginn Jr.; Jaramye Daniels; Reyez; Jefferson	R!o; Harris^{[a]}; Kamo^{[a]}	3:52
8.	"Intruders"	Akil King; Darius Ginn Jr.; Reyez; John Thomas Roach; Mario Jefferson	R!o; Kamo^{[a]}	3:05
9.	"Ankles"	Alexander Delicata; Andre Davidson; Andrew Harr; Jermaine Jackson; Reyez; Sean Davidson	Blvk Jvck; Delicata^{[a]}; The Monarch^{[a]}	2:49
10.	"La Memoria"	Björn Djupström; Reyez; Johann Deterville; Savannah Ré; Tobias Frelin	YogiTheProducer; Djupström^{[b]}; Reyez^{[b]}; Ré^{[c]}; Frelin^{[b]}	3:18
11.	"Same Side"	Reyez; Suby	Suby	3:10
12.	"Figures"	Reyez; Djupström; Shy Carter; Frelin	Djupström; Frelin	3:58
13.	"Dope"	Djupström; Reyez	Djupström	2:38
14.	"Imported" (with 6lack)	Reyez; Henrik Bryld Wolsing; Jaramye Daniels; Ricardo Valentine	Hennedub	3:45
15.	"Far Away II" (featuring A Boogie wit da Hoodie and JID)	Artist Julius Dubose; Destin Choice Route; Reyez; Rogét Chahayed	Chahayed; Vegyn	3:35
16.	"Do You Love Her"	Fredrik Ball; Jessie Reyez; Rui Afonso; Tim Suby	Ball; Lazuli^{[a]}; Suby^{[a]}	3:16
17.	"Love in the Dark"	Reyez; Djupström; Suby; Frelin	Suby; Djupström^{[b]}; Frelin^{[b]}	3:59

Notes

- ^{^[a]} indicates an additional producer
- ^{^[b]} indicates a co-producer
- ^{^[c]} indicates a vocal producer
- The track's titles are stylized in all caps.

== Charts ==
Charts performance for Before Love Came to Kill Us
Chart (2020)	Peak position
Canadian Albums (Billboard)	17
French Albums (SNEP)	198
UK Album Downloads (Official Charts)	79
UK R&B Albums (Official Charts)	10
US Billboard 200	13
US Top R&B/Hip-Hop Albums (Billboard)	9

== Certifications ==
Certifications and sales for Before Love Came to Kill Us
Region	Certification	Certified units/sales
Canada (Music Canada)	Gold	40,000^{‡}
United States (RIAA)	Gold	500,000^{‡}
^{‡} Sales+streaming figures based on certification alone.

== Release history ==
Release formats for Before Love Came to Kill Us
Region	Date	Format(s)	Edition	Label	Ref.
Various	March 27, 2020	CD; cassette; digital download; streaming; vinyl	Standard	FMLY; Island	
Various	March 27, 2020	CD	Target exclusive	FMLY; Island	
Various	April 9, 2020	Digital download; streaming	Deluxe	FMLY; Island	
Various	September 25, 2020	Digital download; streaming	Super deluxe	FMLY; Island	

== See also ==
- List of 2020 albums
