= Imported (song) =

Song by Jessie Reyez and 6LACK

Song by Jessie Reyez featuring JRM

from the EP Being Human in Public
- Length: 4:06
- Label: FMLY; Island
- Songwriters: Jessie Reyez; Henrik Bryld Wolsing; Jaramye Daniels
- Producer: Hennedub

"Imported" is a song by Canadian singer Jessie Reyez from her second extended play Being Human in Public (2018). The original version of the song featured Jamaican singer JRM. Both artists wrote the song alongside its producer Hennedub.

== Personnel ==
Credits adapted from Tidal.

- Hennedub – producer, bass, drums, keyboard, percussion, recording engineer
- Anders Soe – guitar
- Riley Bell – mixer

== 6lack remix ==
"Imported"

Single by Jessie Reyez and 6lack

from the album Before Love Came to Kill Us
- Released: April 9, 2019
- Genre: R&B
- Length: 3:45
- Label: FMLY; Island
- Songwriters: Jessie Reyez; Ricardo Valentine; Henrik Bryld Wolsing; Jaramye Daniels
- Producer: Hennedub

Jessie Reyez singles chronology
"Dear Yessie" (2018)	"Imported" (2019)	"Feels Like Home" (2019)

6lack singles chronology
"It's Not U It's Me" (2019)	"Imported" (2019)	"U Say" (2019)

Music video
- "Imported" on YouTube

=== Release ===
A remix of the song featuring American singer and rapper 6lack was released as a single by FMLY and Island Records on April 9, 2019, as the second single of Reyez's debut studio album Before Love Came to Kill Us (2020). The 6lack remix of "Imported" premiered on Zane Lowe's Beats 1 radio show on April 9, 2019. It was released on digital platforms.

=== Commercial performance ===
In the US, "Imported" peaked at number 14 on the R&B Songs chart and ranked 33rd on its year-end chart. The song did not enter the Billboard Hot 100 but peaked at number 24 on the Bubbling Under Hot 100. It also reached a peak of number 36 on the R&B/Hip-Hop Airplay chart and number 19 on the Rhythmic chart.

"Imported" received a platinum certification from the Recording Industry Association of America (RIAA) for selling one million track-equivalent units in the US and a platinum certification from Music Canada for selling forty thousand track-equivalent units in Canada.

=== Music video ===
The music video for "Imported" was released on April 10, 2019, on YouTube. It was directed by Zac Facts. Jessie Reyez and 6lack portrayed two people going through a heartbreak.

=== Live performances ===
Jessie Reyez and 6lack performed "Imported" with a live band on The Late Show with Stephen Colbert on June 11, 2019. They provided backing vocals to each other's verses and sang the last chorus together.

== Charts ==
=== Weekly charts ===
Chart (2019)	Peak position
US Bubbling Under Hot 100 (Billboard)	24
US R&B Songs (Billboard)	14
US R&B/Hip-Hop Airplay (Billboard)	36
US Rhythmic Airplay (Billboard)	19

=== Year-end charts ===
Chart (2019)	Position
US R&B Songs (Billboard)	33

== Certifications ==
Certifications and sales for "Imported"
Region	Certification	Certified units/sales
Australia (ARIA)	Gold	35,000^{‡}
Canada (Music Canada)	Platinum	80,000^{‡}
United States (RIAA)	2× Platinum	2,000,000^{‡}
^{‡} Sales+streaming figures based on certification alone.
