= Bea Miller =

American singer

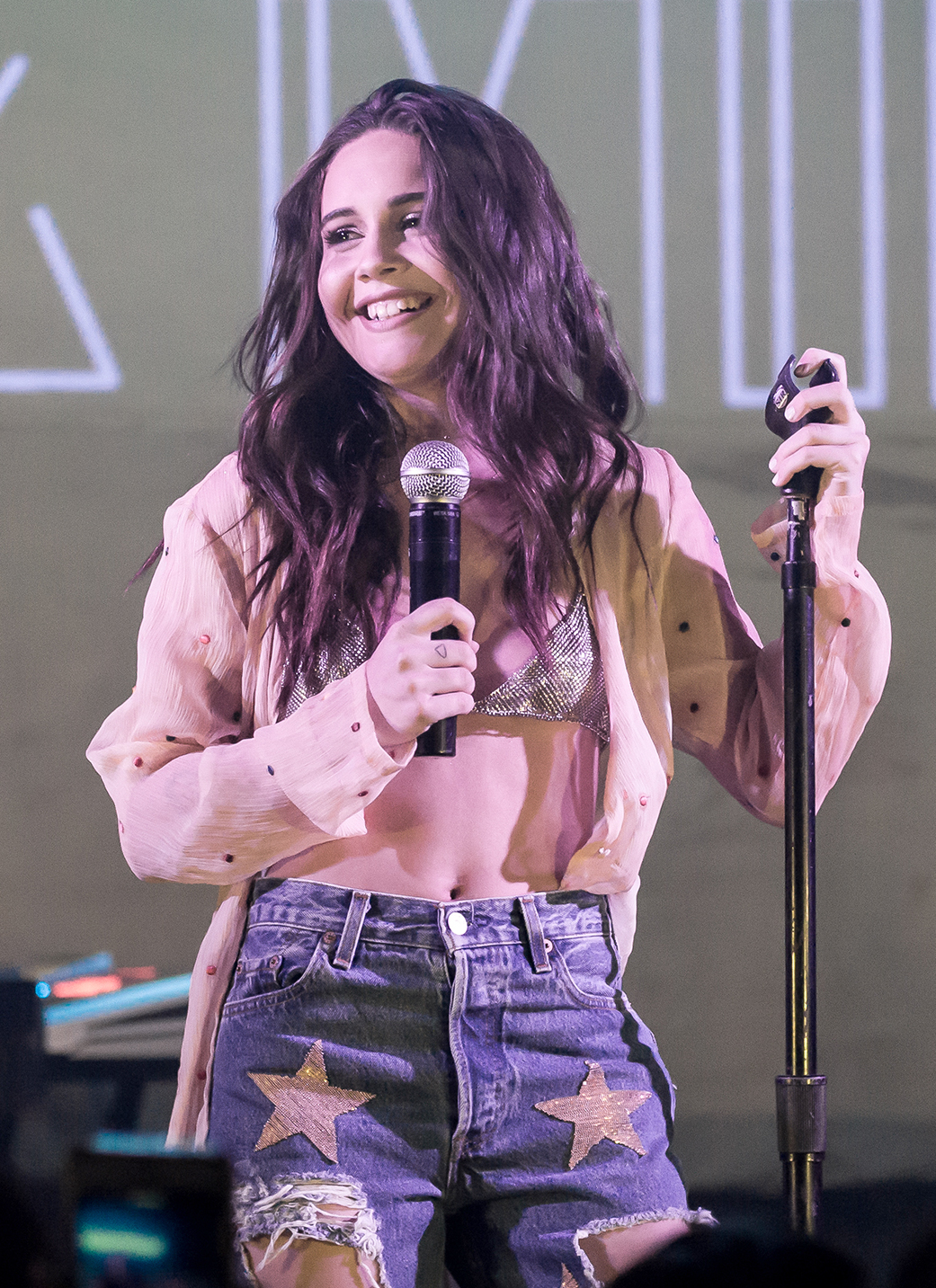
- Miller in 2017

Background information
- Born: Beatrice Annika Miller; February 7, 1999 (age 27); Maplewood, New Jersey
- Genres: Pop; pop rock
- Occupations: Singer; actress
- Instrument: Vocals
- Years active: 2008–present
- Labels: Syco; Hollywood; Create; ADA; Facet; Republic
- Website: beamiller.com

Beatrice Annika Miller is an American singer and actress. She reached 9th place on season two of The X Factor (US) when she was 13 years old, and signed to Syco and Hollywood Records. Her debut EP Young Blood was released in 2014, and her debut album Not an Apology was released the following year, debuting at number 7 on the Billboard 200. In 2016, she released the single "Yes Girl". During 2017, she released the EPs Chapter One: Blue, Chapter Two: Red, and Chapter Three: Yellow. The three EPs, along with five additional songs, were collected as her second studio album, Aurora.

In 2018, she featured as the lead vocalist on NOTD's single "I Wanna Know", which reached the top 20 in Australia, Belgium and Norway. In 2019, she released the singles "It's Not U It's Me" with 6lack, "Feel Something", "Feels Like Home" with Jessie Reyez and "Never Gonna Like You" with Snakehips.

In October 2020, after the unexpected success of "Feel Something", Miller released the single "Wisdom Teeth". The song was released as the lead single to Miller's EP titled, Elated!, which was released on October 23 of that same year.

== Career ==
=== 2012: The X Factor (US) ===
Miller was a contestant on season two of The X Factor, been the fifth contestant eliminated after losing the final showdown to CeCe Frey. However, Miller received more votes than Frey meaning if the result went to deadlock, Miller would have been saved. She performed the following songs on the show:

Episode	Theme	Song	Original artist	Order	Result
Audition	Free choice	"Cowboy Take Me Away"	The Chicks	—N/a	Advanced
Bootcamp 1	Solo performance	Not viewed		—N/a	Advanced
Bootcamp 2	Group performance	Not viewed		—N/a	Advanced
Bootcamp 3	Duet performance	"Pumped Up Kicks" (with Carly Rose Sonenclar)	Foster the People	—N/a	Advanced
Judges' houses	Free choice	"Titanium"	David Guetta and Sia	—N/a	Advanced
Week 1	Made in America	"I Won't Give Up"	Jason Mraz	11	Advanced
Week 2	Songs from movies	"Iris"	Goo Goo Dolls	5	Safe (10th)
Week 3	Divas	"Time After Time"	Cyndi Lauper	4	Safe (8th)
Week 4	Giving Thanks	"Chasing Cars"	Snow Patrol	7	Bottom three (8th)
Week 4 Survival	Singing for Survival	"White Flag"	Dido	2	Eliminated

=== 2013–2015: Record deal and Not an Apology ===
On April 11, 2013, it was officially announced that she was signed to Syco Music and Hollywood Records, marking the first collaborative arrangement between these two labels. Shortly after the ending of the second season of The X Factor, Miller changed her name to simply Bea Miller. She contributed her voice towards the audio book for Jennifer Donnelly's book, Deep Blue: Songspell and a promotional song for it called "Open Your Eyes" in 2014. She uploaded her song "Rich Kids" to YouTube in 2014, and it was included in her 2015 album Not an Apology. She released a clip of a song called "Enemy Fire".

"Enemy Fire" premiered on her own Vevo channel in April 2014. She worked with busbee, Jarrad Rogers, Mike Del Rio, and other noteworthy producers for her album. Her debut EP Young Blood was released on April 22, 2014, with the lead single "Young Blood". Her EP peaked at No. 2 on the iTunes pop albums chart. Her EP had a debut peak on Billboard 200 at No. 64. Miller opened up for Demi Lovato on select cities for her Demi World Tour.

In December 2014, she was picked as Elvis Duran's Artist of the Month and was featured on NBC's Today show hosted by Kathy Lee Gifford and Hoda Kotb, where she performed live her single "Young Blood".

In 2015, Miller was named Radio Disney's newest Next Big Thing artist. She appeared on Disney Channel many times with it and promoted her album with it as well. Her debut single "Young Blood" won the 2015 Radio Disney Music Awards for "Best Song to Rock Out to With Your BFF".

Miller released her debut album, Not an Apology, on July 24, 2015, on Hollywood Records. The album peaked at No. 7 on the Billboard 200. On April 24, 2015, it was announced that Miller would accompany Debby Ryan and Natalie La Rose as opening acts for the summer leg of Fifth Harmony's The Reflection Tour, which began on July 15 in Louisville, Kentucky. Miller finished the tour in late August. In July 2015, she was chosen by public vote to be the next Vevo Lift artist.

=== 2016–2018: Aurora ===
On April 20, 2016, it was announced that Miller would join Selena Gomez on her Revival Tour as an opening act along with DNCE. The tour ran from May throughout the summer. Miller also announced that she would be hosting meet and greets titled "Tea With Bea".

Miller released a non-album single "Yes Girl" on May 20, 2016. She performed the song and a song that was unreleased at the moment, titled "Song Like You" numerous times on the Revival Tour. Her song "This Little Light of Mine" was featured in a 2016 advertising campaign for 3 Musketeers. On February 24, 2017, she released the first part of a three-EP project, Chapter One: Blue. On March 30, 2017, she performed "Song Like You" on The Late Late Show with James Corden. It was her first late-night talk show appearance. On June 2, 2017, she released the second part of her three-EP project, Chapter Two: Red. The final EP, Chapter Three: Yellow was released on October 6, 2017.

In August 2017, Miller's song "Brand New Eyes" was featured in the trailer to the film Wonder, directed by Stephen Chbosky and starring Julia Roberts and Owen Wilson.

Miller's second full-length album and debut international album Aurora was released on February 23, 2018. It includes all the songs from the three previous extended plays (dubbed as "chapters"), along with five new tracks. Miller had a hand in writing all but one of the songs on Aurora, on topics about "everything from existential boredom to slut shaming". She performed "S.L.U.T.", the album's lead single, on MTV's TRL on February 12, 2018. She conceived of the song as a way to reclaim the word's negative connotations as the positive acronym "sweet little unforgettable thing".

She was featured on vocals on the 2018 NOTD single "I Wanna Know", released in March 2018. The song went Gold in the US and is Platinum in several countries, including Australia, Canada, the United Kingdom and Sweden. She performed the song live on Today in June 2018. She also promoted the single at multiple shows and acoustic sets.

=== 2019–2025: Touring and Elated! ===
In February 2019, Miller announced her first headlining tour titled "Nice To Meet U Tour". On March 1, she released the lead single off her upcoming third studio album, titled "It's Not U It's Me", which is a collaboration with American R&B singer 6lack. Following this, she released the single "Feel Something" and announced her "Sunsets in Outerspace Tour". In August 2019, Bea Miller released the single "Feels Like Home" with Canadian singer-songwriter Jessie Reyez. A collaboration with production team Snakehips titled, "Never Gonna Like You", was released in September 2019.

Miller released the single "That Bitch" in November 2019, independently from her record label. She portrayed League of Legends character Evelynn in the virtual musical group K/DA for "The Baddest" a single from K/DA's EP All Out with Miyeon, Soyeon and Wolftyla. In September 2020, Bea Miller would release a series of compilation EPs which consisted of; Quarantine on September 4, Sad Boy Hours on September 18 and Lust on September 24.

On October 7, 2020, Bea Miller announced the release of the single "Wisdom Teeth" which would be released on October 9 and serve as the lead single to Miller's EP Elated!, which was released on October 23, 2020. On November 6, 2021, Miller's single "Playground" was featured in the first act of the League of Legends animated series Arcane; this single was released the same day. The single's music video was part of the opening ceremony for the 2021 League of Legends World Championship.

On January 13, 2023, Miller's single "Lonely Bitch" was released on her own record label, Gauche Records. The record label was created by Miller in partnership with ADA, a music distribution company owned by Warner Music Group.

=== 2026–present: New record deal and Mr. Peaked In High School ===
On May 5, 2026, it was reported that Miller had signed a new record deal with Republic Records. On signing Miller, Republic's Chairwoman and Chief Creative Officer Wendy Goldstein stated, "Bea has a way of telling truths through her music that feels incredibly rare, and we're really excited to be a part of her journey.". Miller's first release with the label, "Depressed on the Internet", was released on May 8, 2026. On August 7, Miller announced on Instagram that her third studio album, Mr. Peaked In High School, would be released on September 18, 2026.

== Personal life ==
Miller is the daughter of two mothers, and has two adopted younger siblings. She was born in Manhattan, New York and was raised in Maplewood, New Jersey. As a preteen, Miller attended the family camp COLAGE in Provincetown, Massachusetts. Miller experiences a form of synesthesia known as chromesthesia, which means she sees different colors when hearing certain sounds.

In 2015, Miller began dating American singer Jacob Whitesides. The couple broke up in May 2016, after one year of dating.

Miller is an ambassador for the anti-bullying charity Ditch the Label.

== Discography ==
- Not an Apology (2015)
- Aurora (2018)
- Mr. Peaked in High School (2026)

== Filmography ==
Year	Title	Role	Notes	Ref
2008	Saturday Night Live	Kid on "The Dakota Fanning Show"	Appearance	
2008	Teddy Grams	Grace	Short film	
2008	Yes, Virginia	Virginia O'Hanlon	Lead role	
2009	Wonder Pets	Cuby / Baby Munchkin	2 episodes	
2009	Confessions of a Shopaholic	Shoestore girl		
2009	Tell-Tale	Angela Bernard		
2009	Ice Age: Dawn of the Dinosaurs	Additional voice		
2009	Yuppie Federation	Waitress		
2010	Hens and Chicks	Hanna	Short film	
2010	Toy Story 3	Molly Davis	Voice role	
2011	Too Big to Fail	Buffett's Great Grandkid		
2012	Lifted	Sara	Short film	
2012	Unforgettable	Katrina Sadler		
2012	The X Factor	Herself		
2013	Officer Down	Lanie Callahan		
2013	Mary and Martha	Funeral singer		
2017	Please Stand By	Tracy		

== Awards and nominations ==
Year	Award	Category	Work	Result	Ref.
2015	Radio Disney Music Awards	Best Song to Rock Out to With your BFFs	"Young Blood"	Won	
2015	Teen Choice Awards	Choice Next Big Thing	Herself	Won	
2016	Teen Choice Awards	Choice Music: Breakout Artist	Herself	Nominated	

== Tours ==
Headlining act

- Nice to Meet U Tour (2019)
- Sunsets in Outerspace Tour (2019)
- Gauche Tour (2023)

Opening act

- Demi Lovato – Demi World Tour (2014)
- Fifth Harmony – The Reflection Tour (2015)
- Selena Gomez – Revival Tour (2016)
- Coldplay – Music of the Spheres World Tour (2022)

Supporting act

- Firefly Festivals
- Lollapalooza
- Voodoo Music Fest
