= Figures (song) =

Song by Canadian singer Jessie Reyez

Single by Jessie Reyez

from the EP Kiddo and the album Before Love Came to Kill Us
- Released: August 26, 2016
- Genre: Soul
- Length: 4:00
- Label: FMLY
- Songwriters: Jessie Reyez; Björn Djupström; Shy Carter; Tobias Frelin
- Producers: Priest and the Beast

Jessie Reyez singles chronology
"k goodnight" (2016)	"Figures" (2016)	"Shutter Island" (2017)

Music video
- "Figures" on YouTube

"Figures" is a song by Canadian singer Jessie Reyez from her debut extended play, Kiddo (2017). It was released as a single by FMLY on August 26, 2016 and was later added to her debut studio album Before Love Came to Kill Us (2020). The song was written by Reyez and Shy Carter alongside Björn Djupström and Tobias Frelin, the members of songwriting duo Priest and the Beast, who also produced it.

== Commercial performance ==
"Figures" was a minor hit in Canada where it peaked at 58 on the Canadian Hot 100. The song received a triple platinum certification from Music Canada for selling 240,000 track-equivalent units.

In the US, the song peaked at number 7 on the R&B Digital Song Sales chart and at 32 on the Rhythmic Songs chart. It received a platinum certification from the Recording Industry Association of America (RIAA) for selling one million track-equivalent units.

== Music video ==
The music video for "Figures" was published on YouTube on August 24, 2016. It is a minimal video in which Reyez sings the song while she is sitting on a chair.

== Live performances ==
On June 18, 2017, Reyez performed "Figures" on the 2017 iHeartRadio Much Music Video Awards Red Carpet pre-show. She again performed the song a week later at the 2017 BET Awards.

Reyez made her late-night TV debut with her performance of "Figures" on The Tonight Show Starring Jimmy Fallon on August 9, 2017. In November 2017, she performed both "Gatekeeper" and "Figures" on Late Night with Seth Meyers, with the latter being released as a web exclusive.

A live performance of "Figures" recorded for Vevo in a motel parking lot was published on Reyez's YouTube channel on March 30, 2020. The singer played the guitar alongside a group of string players.

== Personnel ==
Credits adapted from Tidal.

- Priest and the Beast – producer, recording engineer
- Dustin Richardson – mix engineer
- Cole Nystrom – mixer

== Charts ==
Peak chart performance for "Figures"
Chart (2017–2018)	Peak position
Canada Hot 100 (Billboard)	58
Canada CHR/Top 40 (Billboard)	12
Canada Hot AC (Billboard)	30
US R&B Digital Song Sales (Billboard)	7
US Rhythmic Airplay (Billboard)	32

== Certifications ==
Certifications and sales for "Figures"
Region	Certification	Certified units/sales
Canada (Music Canada)	3× Platinum	240,000^{‡}
France (SNEP)	Gold	100,000^{‡}
New Zealand (RMNZ)	Platinum	30,000^{‡}
United Kingdom (BPI)	Silver	200,000^{‡}
United States (RIAA)	2× Platinum	2,000,000^{‡}
^{‡} Sales+streaming figures based on certification alone.

== Figures, a Reprise ==
"Figures, a Reprise"

Single by Jessie Reyez featuring Daniel Caesar
- Released: March 26, 2018
- Length: 3:12
- Label: FMLY
- Songwriters: Jessie Reyez; Björn Djupström; Shy Carter; Tobias Frelin; Daniel Caesar; Jordan Evans; Matthew Burnett
- Producers: Jordan Evans; Matthew Burnett

Jessie Reyez singles chronology
"Rush" (2018)	"Figures, a Reprise"	"Body Count" (2018)

Daniel Caesar singles chronology
"Best Part" (2017)	"Figures, a Reprise"	"Forever Always" (2018)

=== Background ===
Daniel Caesar asked Jessie Reyez to join him on stage for one of five sold-out shows he played in Toronto. Reyez wanted to sing her song "Figures" and decided to include Caesar's band to her performance. She performed half of the song solo while playing the guitar, and the other half was performed by the band. She later asked Caesar to rework the song with her and "Figures, a Reprise" was done a few weeks later.

=== Release and promotion ===
On March 25, 2018, Reyez shared a screenshot of a chat with Daniel Caesar through her Instagram story. Later that night, they performed "Figures, a Reprise" together during the Juno Awards of 2018. The song was released on digital platforms after their performance.

=== Personnel ===
Credits adapted from Tidal.

- Jordan Evans – producer
- Matthew Burnett – producer, drums
- Ian Culley – guitar
- Saya Gray – bass
- Riley Bell – mixer, recording engineer
