= Yessie =

Studio album by Jessie Reyez
- Released: September 16, 2022
- Length: 35:45
- Labels: FMLY; Island
- Producers: Tim Suby; Ryan "Rykeyz" Williamson; Calvin Harris; Spencer "Moose" Muscio; Anthony Daniel Szczachor; Pomo; Pop Wansel; Daoud; Phinisey

Jessie Reyez chronology
| Before Love Came to Kill Us (2020) | Yessie (2022) | Paid in Memories (2025) |

Singles from Yessie
- 1. "Mutual Friend" Released: August 12, 2022; 2. "Only One" Released: September 14, 2022; 3. "Forever" Released: November 9, 2022

Yessie is the second studio album by Canadian singer-songwriter Jessie Reyez. It was released on September 16, 2022, by FMLY and Island Records. Preceded by the first single, "Mutual Friend", released on August 12, 2022, the album was recorded between 2020 and 2022 during a time of "self-love and self-care".

== Critical reception ==
Professional ratings
Review scores
| Source | Rating |
|---|---|
| Clash | 8/10 |
| The Daily Telegraph | 3/5 stars |

Yessie has received generally positive reviews. Robin Murray of Clash gave the album a positive review, calling the record "scintillating" and "one that gleams with ambition and refuses to linger on the past".

The album was longlisted for the 2023 Polaris Music Prize.

== Track listing ==
Yessie track listing
| No. | Title | Writer(s) | Producer(s) | Length |
|---|---|---|---|---|
| 1. | "Mood" | Jessie Reyez; Anthony Daniel Szczachor; Omar A. Geles Suarez; Ryan Williamson; Spence Muscio | Ryan "Rykeyz" Williamson; Spence "Moose" Muscio; Szczachor; Reyez | 2:59 |
| 2. | "Hittin" | Reyez; Tim Suby | Suby; Reyez | 2:46 |
| 3. | "Forever" (with 6lack) | Reyez; Daniel James McKinnon; Ricardo Valentine | Pomo; Reyez | 3:43 |
| 4. | "Queen St. W" | Reyez; Andrew Wansel; Daoud Anthony; Phinisey | Reyez; "Pop" Wansel; Daoud; Phinisey | 2:51 |
| 5. | "Mutual Friend" | Reyez; Ryan Williamson | Ryan "Rykeyz" Williamson | 3:26 |
| 6. | "Tito's" | Reyez; Adam Wiles; Maneesh Bidaye | Calvin Harris; Reyez | 2:53 |
| 7. | "Only One" | Reyez; Williamson | Rykeyz; Reyez | 3:03 |
| 8. | "Still C U" | Reyez; Jonathan Wienner; Sam Homaee; Suby | Suby; Reyez | 3:13 |
| 9. | "Break Me Down" | Reyez; Suby | Reyez; Suby | 3:11 |
| 10. | "Emotional Detachment Demo" | Reyez; Suby | Suby; Reyez | 4:57 |
| 11. | "Adiós Amor" | Reyez; Andres Frederico Levin; Jean Rodriguez; Suby | Suby; Reyez | 2:39 |
| Total length: | | | | 35:45 |

=== Notes ===
- "Mood" samples "Los Caminos De La Vida", performed by Los Diablitos.

== Charts ==
Chart performance for Yessie
| Chart (2022) | Peak position |
|---|---|
| UK Album Sales (Official Charts) | 100 |
| UK R&B Albums (Official Charts) | 7 |
