= Mr. Peaked in High School =

Studio album by Bea Miller
- Released: September 18, 2026
- Length: 41:44
- Labels: Annika; Republic
- Producers: Dan Crean; Oak Felder; Justin Gill; Oscar Linnander; Shawn Wasabi; Keith Sorrells

Bea Miller chronology
Elated! (2020)	Mr. Peaked in High School (2026)

Singles from Mr. Peaked in High School
- 1. "Depressed on the Internet" Released: May 8, 2026; 2. "Born to Lose" Released: July 3, 2026; 3. "Drunk Enough" Released: August 7, 2026

Mr. Peaked in High School is the third studio album by the American singer and songwriter Bea Miller. It was released on September 18, 2026, under Miller's own label Annika Productions under exclusive licensing to Republic Records.

== Background ==
Mr. Peaked in High School is Miller's first studio album since Aurora (2018) and her first body of work overall since her 2020 extended play Elated!.

== Promotion ==
The album was preceded by the release of three singles. The album's lead single, "Depressed on the Internet", was released on May 8, 2026. Claire Gehlich of Melodic Magazine highlighted the song's chronocilization of depression, writing: "Leaning heavily into the ironic sarcasm Miller has become known for, she realizes she may be struggling mentally. Instead of dealing with it privately, she publicly performs it, ultimately becoming desensitized to how sadness can become part of your identity online." The second single, "Born to Lose", was released on July 3, 2026. The song's lyricism highlights how Miller had grown up in the public eye and the pressures surrounding fame, with Miller commenting in a press release that the song was her "making fun of [herself] before anyone else gets the chance". The third and final single, "Drunk Enough", was released on August 7, 2026. The Line of Best Fit wrote that the song was about "the uncertainty that builds when two people refuse to name the feelings between them."

== Track listing ==
Mr. Peaked in High School track listing
No.	Title	Writer(s)	Producer(s)	Length
1.	"Born to Lose"	Bea Miller; Daniel Crean; Oak Felder; Oscar Linnander; Keith Sorrells; Justin Tranter	Felder; Linnander^{[c]}; Crean^{[c]}; Sorrells^{[c]}	3:14
2.	"Drunk Enough"	Miller; Crean; Felder; Linnander; Tranter	Felder; Crean; Linnander; Sorrells	3:24
3.	"Sex for Attention"	Miller; Crean; Felder; Linnander; Tranter	Felder; Crean; Linnander; Sorrells	3:24
4.	"Bad Person"	Miller; Crean; Felder; Linnander; Tranter	Felder; Crean; Linnander; Sorrells	3:07
5.	"Pretty and Alone"	Miller; Crean; Felder; Linnander; Tranter	Felder; Crean; Linnander; Sorrells	3:06
6.	"Unloveable"	Miller; Crean; Felder; Linnander; Tranter	Felder; Crean; Linnander; Sorrells	3:00
7.	"Depressed on the Internet"	Miller; Crean; Shawn Serrano; Tranter	Felder; Crean; Shawn Wasabi	2:57
8.	"Summer of '16"	Miller; Crean; Serrano; Tranter	Felder; Crean; Shawn Wasabi	3:30
9.	"L.A. Ugly"	Miller; Crean; Felder; Linnander; Tranter	Felder; Crean; Linnander; Sorrells	3:00
10.	"Hottest Girls"	Miller; Crean; Serrano; Tranter	Felder; Crean; Jason Gill; Shawn Wasabi	3:38
11.	"Take You with Me"	Miller; Crean; Felder; Linnander; Tranter	Felder; Crean; Linnander; Sorrells	3:28
12.	"Past My Prime"	Miller; Felder; Linnander; Ella Mayjor; Tranter	Felder; Linnander; Sorrells	2:36
13.	"Party"	Miller; Crean; Adore Delano; Serrano; Tranter	Felder; Crean; Shawn Wasabi	3:20
Total length:				41:44

=== Notes ===
- ^{^[c]} signifies a co-producer
- All tracks are stylized in full lowercase, except "Sex for Attention" (stylized in rhetorical capitalization as "sex for ATTENTION"), "L.A. Ugly" (stylized in uppercase), and "Party" (stylized in uppercase).

== Personnel ==
Credits are adapted from Tidal.

- Bea Miller – vocals (all tracks), background vocals (tracks 1–6, 8–13)
- Oak Felder – vocal production (all tracks); background vocals, drums, keyboards (1–6, 8–13); programming (1–6, 8–11, 13), engineering (1–6, 9, 12)
- Mitch McCarthy – mixing
- Randy Merrill – mastering
- Dan Crean – guitar (1–6, 8–11, 13), bass guitar (6, 10), mandolin (6), keyboards (8, 10, 13)
- Justin Tranter – background vocals (1–6, 8–13), executive production
- Oscar Linnander – background vocals, guitar, engineering (1–6, 9, 12); programming (1–6, 9)
- Keith Sorrells – background vocals, bass guitar, guitar, engineering (1–6, 9, 12)
- Shawn Wasabi – engineering (7, 8, 10, 11, 13); drums, keyboards, programming (8, 10, 11, 13); background vocals (10, 11)
- Amber Jones – engineering assistance (8, 10, 13)
- Adore Delano – vocals (13)

== Release history ==
Release dates and formats for Mr. Peaked in High School
Region	Date	Format(s)	Label	Ref.
Various	September 18, 2026	CD; digital download; streaming; vinyl LP	Annika Productions; Republic	
