= Being Human in Public =

EP by Jessie Reyez
- Released: October 19, 2018
- Genres: Pop; R&B
- Length: 22:10
- Labels: FMLY; Island

Jessie Reyez chronology
Kiddo (2017)	Being Human in Public (2018)	Before Love Came to Kill Us (2020)

Singles from Being Human in Public
- 1. "Apple Juice" Released: July 19, 2018; 2. "Sola" Released: August 10, 2018; 3. "Body Count (Remix)" Released: August 24, 2018; 4. "Fuck Being Friends" Released: September 7, 2018; 5. "Dear Yessie" Released: September 21, 2018; 6. "Imported" Released: October 5, 2018

Professional ratings
Review scores
Source	Rating
Exclaim!	8/10
Rolling Stone	3.5/5 stars

Being Human in Public is the second EP by Canadian singer-songwriter Jessie Reyez. It was released on October 19, 2018, by FMLY and Island Records. It features guest appearances from JRM, Kehlani and Normani. The EP was placed on the longlist for the 2019 Polaris Music Prize. It won R&B/Soul Recording of the Year at the 2019 Juno Awards and was nominated for Best Urban Contemporary Album at the 2020 Grammy Awards.

== Track listing ==
No.	Title	Writer(s)	Length
1.	"Saint Nobody"	Jessie Reyez; Tim Suby	3:12
2.	"Apple Juice"	Jessie Reyez; Tim Suby; Fred Ball	2:57
3.	"Sola"	Jessie Reyez; Claudia Brant	3:29
4.	"Fuck Being Friends"	Jessie Reyez; Tim Suby	2:30
5.	"Dear Yessie"	Jessie Reyez; Tim Suby	3:08
6.	"Imported" (featuring JRM)	Jessie Reyez; Jaramye Daniels; Henrik Wolsing	4:03
7.	"Body Count (Remix)" (featuring Normani and Kehlani)	Jessie Reyez; Normani Hamilton; Kehlani Parrish; Kenneth Edmonds; Rachel Keen; Victoria McCants; Khristopher Riddick-Tynes	2:38
Total length:			22:10

== Charts ==
Chart (2018)	Peak position
US R&B Album Sales (Billboard)	13
US R&B/Hip-Hop Album Sales (Billboard)	47
