= A Little Vengeance =

Studio album by Jessie Reyez
- Released: June 12, 2026
- Length: 46:08
- Labels: FMLY; Island
- Producers: 9th of Feb; Fred Ball; Beach Noise; BongoByTheWay; Heather Crawford; Dot da Genius; Jeff Gitty; Joe Harrison; Akeel Henry; Hoskins; J Gramm; Los Hendrix; The Monsters & Strangerz; Jacob Olofsson; Scribz Riley; The Runners; Rykeyz; Scum; Tim Suby; Eugene Tsai

Jessie Reyez chronology
Paid in Memories (2025)	A Little Vengeance (2026)

Singles from A Llittle Vengeance
- 1. "N.Y.F.F." Released: April 17, 2026; 2. "Ain't U Tired?" Released: May 1, 2026; 3. "Ur Heartbeat (Who Do U Think About at 2AM?)" Released: May 29, 2026; 4. "99%" Released: June 12, 2026

Professional ratings
Review scores
Source	Rating
AllMusic	3.5/5 stars

A Little Vengeance (stylized in all caps) is the fourth studio album by the Canadian singer-songwriter Jessie Reyez. It was released on June 12, 2026, by FMLY and Island Records.

A Little Vengeance was prefaced with the singles "N.Y.F.F.", "Ain't You Tired?" with Muni Long", and "Ur Heartbeat (Who Do U Think About at 2AM?)". Along with the release of her album, Reyez launched the Jessie Reyez Fund in partnership with Plus1, with the goal of expanding access to opportunities in the music industry for women and historically underrepresented communities.

== Critical reception ==
Amanda McArthur of Sweety High called the record "her most vulnerable—and highly listenable—body of work yet." On June 24, 2026, Complex Canada ranked it 3rd on their 10 best Canadian albums of 2026 (so far) list.

== Track listing ==
A Little Vengeance track listing
No.	Title	Writer(s)	Producer(s)	Length
1.	"Crumble"	Jessie Reyez; Ryan Williamson	Rykeyz	2:36
2.	"Ain't U Tired?" (with Muni Long)	ReyezUforo Ebong; Akeel Henry; Priscilla Renea	BongoByTheWay; Henry	2:36
3.	"Madame Joyce's Interlude"	Reyez; Jermi Thomas	9th of Feb	2:29
4.	"N.Y.F.F."	Reyez; Ty Donaldson; Ebong; Joe Harrison; Thomas	9th of Feb; Harrison; Scum; Trey Campbell^{[v]}; Thomas^{[v]}	2:22
5.	"Dusty" (with Ty Dolla Sign)	Reyez; Jeff Gitelman; Tyrone Griffin; Jordan K. Johnson; Stefan Johnson	Jeff Gitty; The Monsters & Strangerz	3:13
6.	"iBreak"	Reyez; J Gramm; Oladipo Omishore; Thomas	9th of Feb; Dot da Genius; J Gramm; Eugene Tsai	2:46
7.	"Fuck You Jessie"	Reyez	Hoskins; Jacob Olofsson; Scribz Riley	2:17
8.	"F.M.L.Y. Interlude"	Reyez; Thomas	9th of Feb; Heather Crawford; Thomas^{[v]}	0:55
9.	"Everybody Cries Sometimes"	Reyez; Gitelman; J. Johnson; S. Johnson	Jeff Gitty; The Monsters & Strangerz	2:16
10.	"Salt"	Reyez; Tim Suby	Suby	3:12
11.	"Love & Money Don't Go" (with Raahiim)	Reyez	The Runners; 9th of Feb^{[a]}; Raahiim^{[a]}	3:46
12.	"99%"	Reyez; Suby; Thomas	9th of Feb; Suby	3:02
13.	"When You Hold Her"	Reyez; Williamson	Rykeyz	3:20
14.	"G's Interlude"	Reyez; Fred Ball	9th of Feb	0:27
15.	"Ur Heartbeat (Who Do U Think About at 2AM?)"	Reyez; Ball; Shahid Khan; Carlos Muñoz; James Murray; Mustapha Omer; Thomas	9th of Feb; Ball; Los Hendrix; Mojam^{[a]}; Naughty Boy^{[a]}	2:50
16.	"Synesthesia" (with Lekan and D Smoke)	Reyez; Ebong; Lekan; Daniel Farris	BongoByTheWay	3:59
17.	"Ego Atrophy" (with Bob Marley)	Reyez; Derek Blythe; Jake Kosich; Johnny Kosich; Matthew Schaeffer	9th of Feb; Beach Noise; Tsai; Phinisey^{[a]}; Thomas^{[v]}; Lekan^{[v]}	4:48
Total length:				46:08

=== Notes ===
- ^{^[a]} indicates an additional producer.
- ^{^[v]} indicates a vocal producer.

== Personnel ==
Credits are adapted from Tidal.

=== Musicians ===
- Jessie Reyez – performance (all tracks), background vocals (tracks 1, 2, 5, 6, 9, 10, 16, 17), keyboards (15)
- Tim Suby – theremin (1, 9, 15); bass, guitar, keyboards, programming (10, 12); additional vocals (10)
- Rykeyz – bass, drums, guitar, keyboards, percussion (1, 13); programming (1), string arrangement (13)
- BongoByTheWay – percussion (2, 4), programming (2, 16); background vocals, bass, drums, guitar, keyboards, vocals (2)
- Akeel Henry – bass, drums, guitar, keyboards, programming, strings (2)
- Muni Long – featured vocals, background vocals (2)
- Kaylyn O'Neal – background vocals (2)
- Trey Campbell – background vocals (3, 4, 6, 17)
- Madame Joyce – additional vocals (3)
- Sherie Farris – violin (3)
- Joe Harrison – bass, guitar, keyboards (4)
- Scum – drums (4)
- Jermi Thomas – programming (4, 12), vocal arrangement (6, 11, 15, 17), background vocals (8), vocals (12)
- Jeff Gitelman – guitar (5, 9); bass, drums, percussion, programming (5)
- Jordan K. Johnson – bass, drums, guitar, percussion, programming (5)
- Stefan Johnson – bass, drums, guitar, percussion, programming (5)
- Ty Dolla Sign – featured vocals, background vocals (5)
- 9th of Feb – programming (6, 11, 12, 15, 19), background vocals (9), vocal arrangement (14, 17)
- Eugene Tsai – programming (6, 17); brass, electric guitar, percussion (6)
- Jordan Brooks – bass (6)
- J Gramm – drums (6)
- Dot da Genius – programming (6)
- Scribz Riley – bass, drums, guitar, percussion, programming, vocals (7)
- Jonathan Hoskins – bass, drums, guitar, programming (7)
- Jacob Olofsson – keyboards, programming (7)
- La'Nisaá Tucker-Faruq – background vocals (8)
- Heather Crawford – guitar (8)
- Lekan – background vocals (11, 14–17), featured vocals (16)
- Raahiim – featured vocals, background vocals, programming (11)
- The Runners – programming (11)
- Amanda Stollings – additional vocals (13)
- Brooke Brewer – additional vocals (13)
- Eric Brooks – additional vocals (13)
- Landon Thomas IV – additional vocals (13)
- Mary Floyd – additional vocals (13)
- Naarai Jacobs – additional vocals (13)
- Steve Epting – additional vocals (13)
- Nashville Recording Orchestra – strings (13)
  - Amy Helman – violin
  - Annaliese Kowert – violin
  - Carrie Bailey – violin
  - David Davidson – violin
  - Janet Darnall – violin
  - Jerry Allison – violin
  - Karen Wilkinson – violin
  - Elizabeth Lamb – viola
  - Patrick Monnius – viola
  - Austin Hoke – cello
  - Kevin Bate – cello
- Naughty Boy – drums (15)
- Los Hendrix – guitar (15)
- Mojam – keyboards (15)
- D Smoke – featured vocals, background vocals, guitar (16)
- Derek Blythe – bass, drums, guitar, keyboards, programming (17)
- Johnny Kosich – keyboards, programming (17)
- Matthew Schaeffer – keyboards, programming (17)
- Bob Marley – spoken word (17)
- Phinisey – programming (17)

=== Technical ===
- Rykeyz – engineering (1, 13)
- BongoByTheWay – engineering (2, 16)
- Karl Wingate – engineering (2, 16)
- Akeel Henry – engineering (2)
- Max Steger – engineering (3)
- Nicci Gomez – engineering (4, 6)
- Jermi Thomas – engineering (4, 8, 12)
- Karl Wingate – engineering (4, 8)
- Chad "KM" Kitchens – engineering (4)
- Stefan Johnson – engineering (5, 9)
- Jeff Gitelman – engineering (5)
- Jordan K. Johnson – engineering (5)
- 9th of Feb – engineering (6, 11, 12, 15, 17)
- Eugene Tsai – engineering (6, 17)
- Dot da Genius – engineering (6)
- Hoskins – engineering (7)
- Jacob Olofsson – engineering (7)
- Scribz Riley – engineering (7)
- Tim Suby – engineering (10, 12)
- Raahiim – engineering (11)
- The Runners – engineering (11)
- Mayne at da Crib – engineering (11)
- Scott Gerow – engineering (13)
- Lekan – vocal engineering (14)
- Beach Noise – engineering (17)
- Derek Blythe – engineering (17)
- Phinisey – engineering (17)
- Jon Castelli – mixing (1, 7, 12–14)
- DJ Riggins – mixing (2–4, 8, 11, 14, 16)
- Josh Gudwin – mixing (5, 9)
- Neal H Pogue – mixing (6)
- John Kercy – mixing (10, 17)
- Steve Fitzmaurice – mixing (15)
- Brad Lauchert – additional mixing (1, 7, 12, 13)
- Zachary Acosta – additional mixing (6)
- Felix Byrne – additional mixing (9)
- Najeeb Jones – additional mixing (10, 17)
- Mike Bozzi – mastering
- Adam Burt – mastering assistance (2)
- Katie Harvey – mastering assistance (2)
- David "Dsilb" Silberstein – production coordination (5)

== Charts ==
Chart performance for A Little Vengeance
Chart (2026)	Peak position
US Billboard 200	141
US Top R&B/Hip-Hop Albums (Billboard)	42
