= Feels like Home (Bea Miller and Jessie Reyez song) =

2021 single by Bea Miller and Jessie Reyez

"Feels Like Home"

Single by Bea Miller and Jessie Reyez

from the EP Lust
- Released: August 23, 2019
- Length: 3:31
- Label: Hollywood
- Songwriter(s): Jessie Reyez, Tim Suby
- Producer(s): Tim Suby

Bea Miller singles chronology
"Feel Something" (2019)	"Feels Like Home" (2019)	"Never Gonna Like You" (2019)

Jessie Reyez singles chronology
"Imported" (2018)	"Feels like Home" (2019)	"Feel It Too" (2019)

Music video
- "Feels Like Home" on YouTube

"Feels Like Home" (stylized in all caps) is a song by American singer Bea Miller and Canadian singer Jessie Reyez. It was released as a single on August 23, 2019. The song was later included on the compilation EP, Lust, on September 25, 2020.

== Background ==
The song was first announced by Miller on her Twitter account on August 20, 2019. A video of Miller singing part of the song was released on the same date. The next day, fans could unlock a preview of the song if they tweeted the hashtag "#feelslikehome".

== Music video ==
On August 22, 2019, Miller announced that the music video would drop on the same date as the song.

== Release history ==
Country	Date	Format	Label	Ref.
Various	August 23, 2019	Digital download; streaming	Hollywood	
