= It's Not U It's Me =

2019 single by Bea Miller and 6lack

Single by Bea Miller and 6lack
- Released: March 1, 2019
- Genre: Synth-pop
- Length: 3:15
- Label: Hollywood
- Songwriters: Beatrice Miller; Justin Tranter; Mary Weitz; Mike Sabath; Ricardo Valentine
- Producer: Mike Sabath

Bea Miller singles chronology
"Waste of Time" (2018)	"It's Not U It's Me" (2019)	"Comethru" (2019)

6lack singles chronology
"Only Want You" (2019)	"It's Not U It's Me" (2019)	"Imported" (2019)

Music video
- "It's Not U It's Me" on YouTube

"It's Not U It's Me" (stylized in all lowercase) is a song by American singers Bea Miller and 6lack. Hollywood Records released it on March 1, 2019, as the intended lead single from Miller's upcoming third studio album.

== Background and promotion ==
On February 14, 2019, Miller teased the track on Twitter. She posted a picture of herself with the song's title as the caption. On February 25, 2019, Miller announced the release date of the song along with a snippet of the song's chorus. On February 28, 2019, Miller announced that the song would release at midnight and would be a collaboration with rapper 6lack.

== Composition ==
"It's Not U It's Me" is a synth-pop song written by Miller, Justin Tranter, Mary Weitz, Mike Sabath, and 6lack, and produced by Sabath. The song is about "working on oneself before trying to help someone else". Miller said in an interview with Bustle that she wanted to "write a self-love song that wasn't corny" with this song.

== Music video ==
The official music video for the song was released on April 11, 2019. The video shows Miller and 6lack "explor[ing] self-love" in a "pastel future" world. The video shows Miller in her home reading an advertisement in a magazine that says "Learn how to find yourself in the Dream World". Miller then dials the phone number featured in the advertisement and is transported into the Dream World. Miller eventually returns to her home where 6lack appears in her window and then in her living room by a cloud of purple smoke.

== Credits and personnel ==
Credits adapted from Tidal.

- Bea Miller – composer, lyricist
- 6lack – composer, lyricist
- Mike Sabath – producer, composer, lyricist, mixer, studio personnel
- Justin Tranter – composer, lyricist
- Mary Weitz – composer, lyricist

== Charts ==
Chart (2019)	Peak position
New Zealand Hot Singles (RMNZ)	38
