= Jessie Reyez =

Canadian singer-songwriter (born 1991)

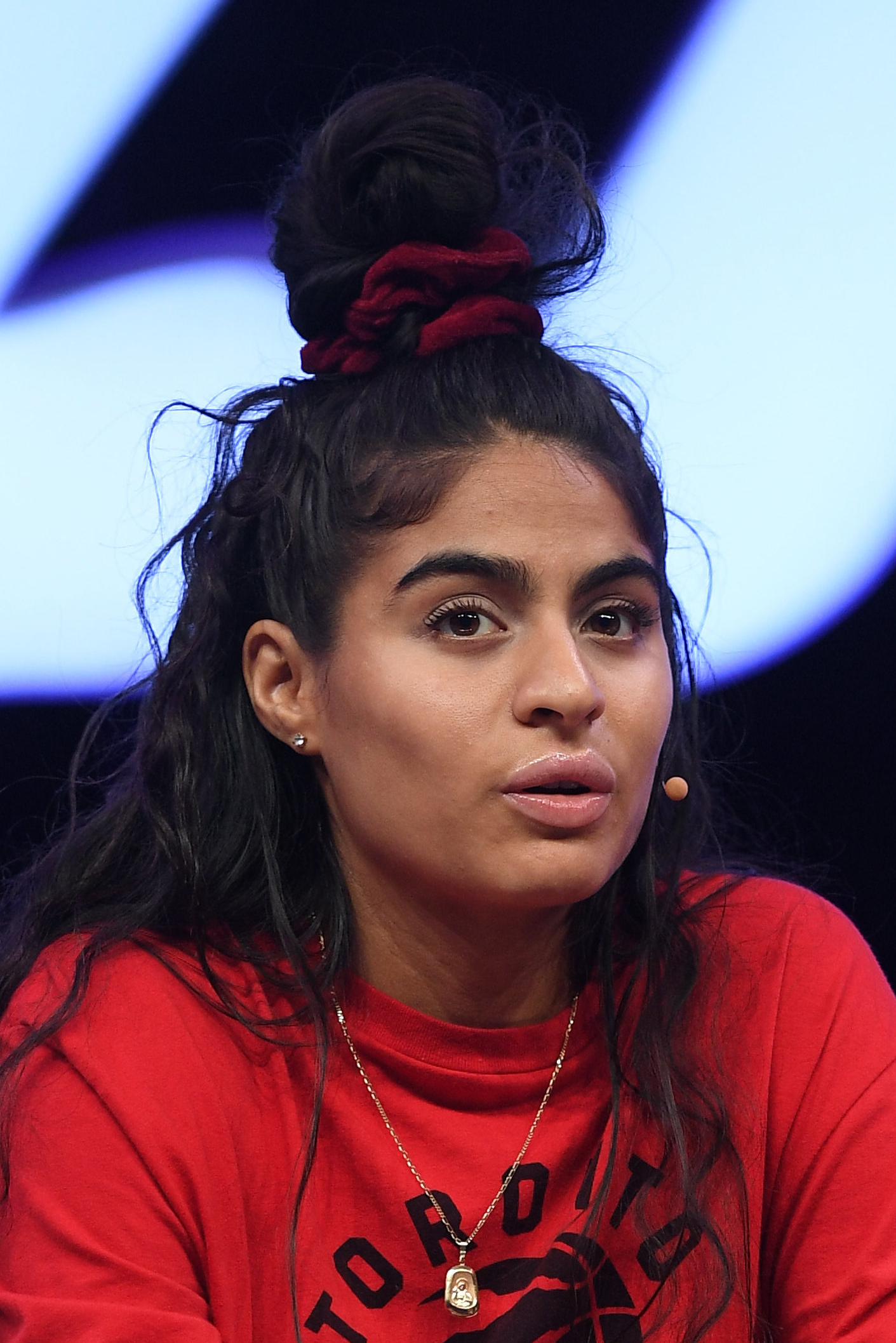
- Reyez in Toronto, Canada (2019)

Background information
- Born: Jessica Reyez; June 12, 1991 (age 35); Toronto, Ontario, Canada
- Genres: R&B; pop; hip hop
- Occupations: Singer; songwriter
- Instruments: Vocals; guitar; ukulele; piano
- Years active: 2014–present
- Labels: FMLY; Island; Republic
- Producer(s): Tim Suby
- Website: jessiereyez.com

Jessica Reyez (born June 12, 1991) is a Canadian singer-songwriter. Her 2016 single, "Figures", peaked at number 58 on the Canadian Hot 100 and received triple platinum certification by Music Canada (MC) and platinum by the Recording Industry Association of America (RIAA). Her debut extended play (EP), Kiddo (2017), led her to win Breakthrough Artist from four nominations at the 2018 Juno Awards. Her second EP, Being Human in Public (2018), was released the following year, won R&B/Soul Recording of the Year at the 2019 Juno Awards, and was nominated for Best Urban Contemporary Album at the 2020 Grammy Awards.

Reyez won the R&B/Soul Recording of the Year once more for her 2019 single "Feel it Too" (with Tory Lanez and Tainy), at the 2020 Juno Awards, where she was also nominated for Artist of the Year. Reyez has written songs for Calvin Harris, Kehlani, Dua Lipa, and Normani, most notably penning the hit "One Kiss", and has collaborated with Eminem on multiple occasions. Her debut studio album, Before Love Came to Kill Us (2020), was met with widespread critical acclaim and commercial success, peaking at number 13 on the US Billboard 200.

== Early life ==
Jessica Reyez was born in Toronto, Ontario to Colombian parents. She was introduced to the guitar by her father, leading to a career in art and music. She played guitar as a child and began writing her own music in high school. Reyez and her family then moved to Brampton, where she attended St. Thomas Aquinas CSS. After graduating, she opted out of post secondary education and instead chose to pursue her music while doing odd jobs on the side. In 2012, Reyez and her family moved to Florida, where she was primarily bartending and busking on the beach, but she returned to Toronto in 2014 after being accepted to The Remix Project's Academy of Recording Arts. At the Remix Project, Reyez was mentored by Daniel Daley from Dvsn, and her music was heard by King Louie.

== Career ==
=== Early career and Kiddo (2014–2017) ===
In 2014, Reyez and King Louie released a joint single titled "Living in the Sky", followed by a second single, "It Hurts (Selena)", in 2015. In early 2017, she released the single "Shutter Island" and toured Europe opening for PartyNextDoor. Her follow-up single, "Figures", was premiered by Zane Lowe on Beats 1 radio, alongside its music video. "Figures" peaked at number 58 on the Canadian Hot 100 in 2017 and was certified triple platinum by Music Canada.

In April 2017, Reyez released her debut EP, Kiddo as well as her short film Gatekeeper, which addressed sexism and exploitation in the music industry. It specifically was based on her experience with music producer Noel "Detail" Fisher, who was accused of sexual misconduct by multiple women, including artist Bebe Rexha. Kiddo peaked at number 83 on the Canadian Album Chart.

Kiddo was placed on the Long List of the 2017 Polaris Music Prize and lead to four nominations at the 2018 Juno Awards (R&B/Soul Recording of the Year, Breakthrough Artist, Video of the Year, and Juno Fan Choice Award), where she won Breakthrough Artist. She also received two 2017 iHeartRadio Much Music Video Awards nominations for Best New Canadian Artist and Fan Fave Video for "Shutter Island". She was also nominated for two 2018 MTV Music Video Awards, including Push Artist of the Year and Video With A Message (for "Gatekeeper"). Reyez performed "Figures" at the 2017 BET Awards on June 25, 2017 and on The Tonight Show Starring Jimmy Fallon on August 8, 2017. Later in 2017, she signed a record and publishing deal with Island Records.

=== Being Human in Public (2018–2019) ===
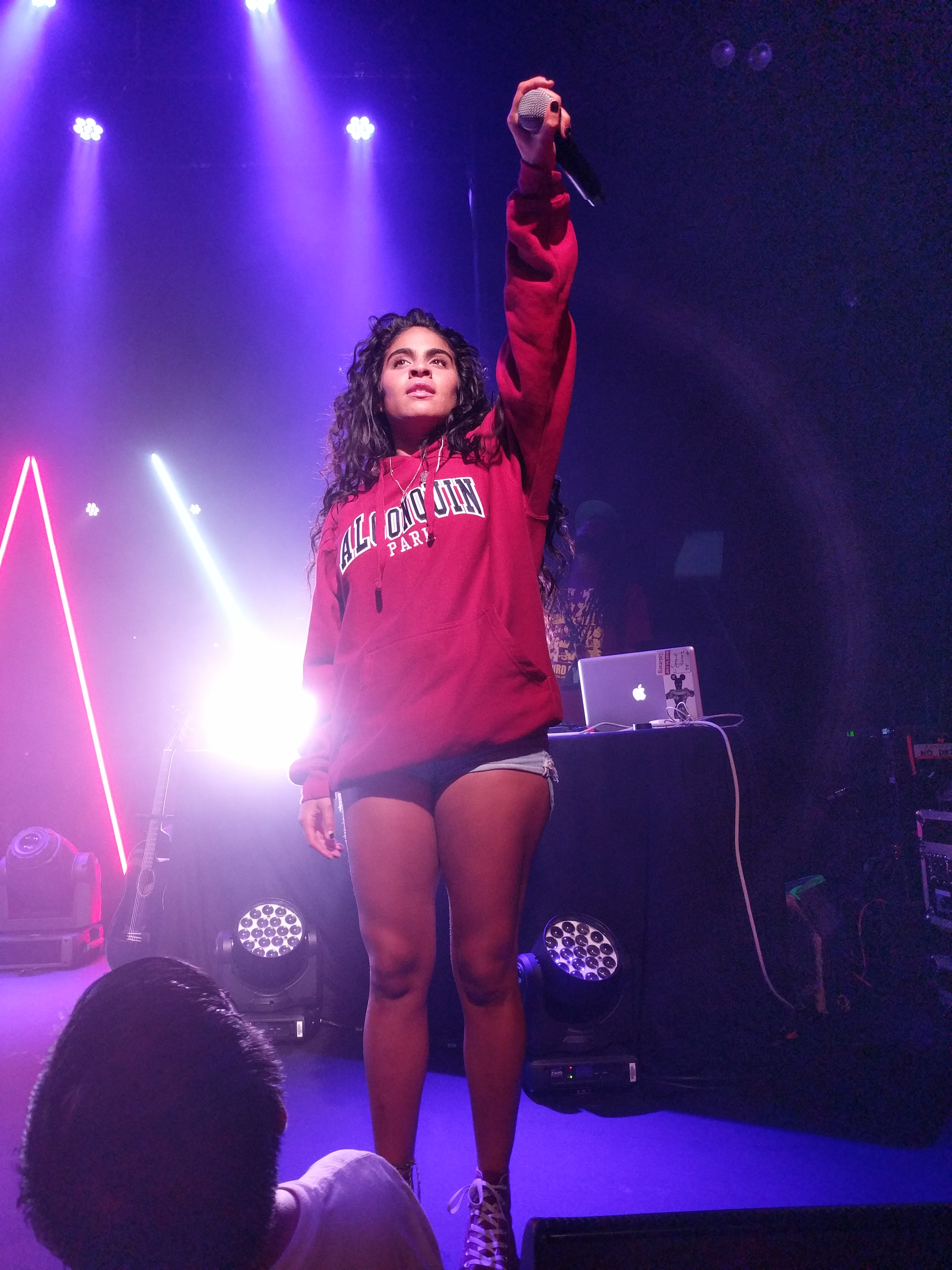
Reyez in 2018

Billboard named Reyez one of the "10 Hip-Hop and R&B Artists to Watch in 2018". She also received a SOCAN Songwriting Prize nomination for the song "Cotton Candy". Recorded in 2017, Reyez collaborated with Lewis Capaldi on his 2018 single “Rush”. Reyez joined Capaldi again in the music video of the single. She then released her second EP, Being Human in Public, and toured across North America. The EP won 2019's R&B/Soul Recording of The Year at the 2019 Juno Awards and was nominated for Best Urban Contemporary Album at the 2020 Grammy Awards. It also appeared on the short list for the 2019 Polaris Music Prize.

In August, Reyez collaborated with Eminem on "Nice Guy" and "Good Guy", from the album Kamikaze, both charting on the Billboard Hot 100 and appeared on the soundtrack to Fifty Shades Freed. On April 9, 2019, Reyez released the single "Imported" featuring 6lack, a re-working of a song off her last EP. The single was later certified Gold by both the RIAA and Music Canada. She also had a cameo in the Netflix film, Someone Great and appeared on The Lion King: The Gift, performing (with 070 Shake) and co-writing the song "Scar".

=== Before Love Came to Kill Us (2020–2021) ===
Reyez received her first Grammy nomination, when Being Human in Public was nominated for Best Urban Contemporary Album at the 2020 Grammy Awards. Reyez opened for Billie Eilish on her Where Do We Go? world tour, with some of the dates postponed due to COVID-19 pandemic. She was also booked to perform for the first time at Coachella festival, which was also postponed due to the pandemic.

Reyez released her debut studio album, Before Love Came to Kill Us, on March 27, 2020. The album includes collaborations with Eminem and 6lack, with the deluxe edition including additional features from Rico Nasty, Melii, JID, and A Boogie wit da Hoodie. The album was preceded by the single "Love in the Dark" and also included previous singles "Figures" and "Imported". Before Love Came to Kill Us debuted at #13 on the Billboard 200 and was short-listed for the 2020 Polaris Music Prize.

Reyez was nominated for two awards at the 2020 Juno Awards: Artist of the Year and R&B/Soul Recording of the Year (for "Feel It Too" with Tory Lanez and Tainy), winning the latter award. The music video for Reyez's song "Far Away" won the 2020 Prism Prize, with director Peter Huang winning the $20,000 award. Reyez was featured in Beyoncé's musical film Black Is King, which premiered on Disney+ in July 2020.

She received nominations for five awards at the 2021 Juno Awards: Artist of the Year, Songwriter of the Year, and Juno Award for R&B/Soul Recording of the Year (for Before Love Came to Kill Us), with two of her music videos nominated Video of the Year. "No One's in the Room" which was directed by Emma Higgins, ended up taking the prize.

=== Yessie, Paid In Memories, and A Little Vengeance (2022–present) ===
Reyez released her second studio album, Yessie, on September 16, 2022. The album consists of 11 tracks, featuring one collaboration with former collaborator 6lack on the song "Forever".

Her third album, Paid In Memories, was released on March 28, 2025, and was accompanied by a tour in Canada and the U.S. that year. On July 28 in an event at the GRAMMY Museum in Los Angeles, she detailed her artistic process while in conversation with Victoria Monét.

Her fourth album, A Little Vengeance, was released on June 12, 2026. The same day, Reyez performed "Illuminate" with Elyanna at the Canadian opening ceremony of the 2026 FIFA World Cup in Toronto, Canada. On June 24, 2026, Complex Canada ranked it 3^{rd} on their 10 best Canadian albums of 2026 (so far) list. Reyez announced A Little Vengeance Tour to take place in November 2026 in Canada and the US.

== Discography ==
Studio albums

- Before Love Came to Kill Us (2020)
- Yessie (2022)
- Paid in Memories (2025)
- A Little Vengeance (2026)

== Tours ==
Headlining

- The Kiddo Tour (2018)
- Being Human in Public Tour (2019)
- Before Love Came to Kill Us Tour (2020)
- Yessie Tour (2022–23)
- Paid in Memories Tour (2025)
- A Little Vengeance Tour (2026)

Supporting

- PartyNextDoor – European Tour (2014)
- Halsey – Hopeless Fountain Kingdom Tour (2018)
- Billie Eilish – Where Do We Go? World Tour (2020)
- Billie Eilish – Happier Than Ever, The World Tour (2022)
- Sam Smith – Gloria World Tour (2023)
- Jhené Aiko – The Magic Hour Tour (2024)

== Awards and nominations ==
List of awards and nominations for Jessie Reyez
Year	Award	Category	Work	Result
2017	iHeartRadio Much Music Video Awards	Best New Canadian Artist	Herself	Nominated
2017	iHeartRadio Much Music Video Awards	Fan Fave Video	"Shutter Island" (directed by Peter Huang)	Nominated
2017	Polaris Music Prize	Long List	Kiddo	Nominated
2017	SOCAN Songwriting Prize	Anglophone Song	"Figures"	Nominated
2018	Juno Awards	Breakthrough Artist	Herself	Won
2018	Juno Awards	R&B/Soul Recording of the Year	Kiddo	Nominated
2018	Juno Awards	Video of The Year	"Gatekeeper" (directed by Peter Huang)	Nominated
2018	Juno Awards	Juno Fan Choice Award	Herself	Nominated
2018	MTV Video Music Awards	Push Artist of the Year	Herself	Nominated
2018	MTV Video Music Awards	Video with a Message	"Gatekeeper"	Nominated
2018	MTV Europe Music Award	Best New Act	Herself	Nominated
2018	Prism Prize	Short List	"Gatekeeper" (directed by Peter Huang)	Nominated
2019	SOCAN Songwriting Prize	Anglophone Song	"Cotton Candy"	Nominated
2019	Juno Awards	R&B/Soul Recording of the Year	Being Human in Public	Won
2019	Polaris Music Prize	Short List	Being Human in Public	Nominated
2019	Prism Prize	Short List	"Body Count" (directed by Peter Huang)	Nominated
2020	Grammy Awards	Best Urban Contemporary Album	Being Human in Public	Nominated
2020	Juno Awards	Artist of the Year	Herself	Nominated
2020	Juno Awards	R&B/Soul Recording of the Year	"Feel It Too" (with Tory Lanez and Tainy)	Won
2020	Polaris Music Prize	Short List	Before Love Came to Kill Us	Shortlisted
2020	Billboard	Impact Award	Herself	Won
2020	Prism Prize	Grand Prize	"Far Away" (directed by Peter Huang)	Won
2021	Juno Awards	Artist of the Year	Herself	Nominated
2021	Juno Awards	Songwriter of the Year	Herself	Nominated
2021	Juno Awards	Contemporary R&B/Soul Recording of the Year	Before Love Came to Kill Us	Nominated
2021	Juno Awards	Video of the Year	"Intruders" (directed by Les Solis, Peter Huang)	Nominated
2021	Juno Awards	Video of the Year	"No One's in the Room" (directed by Emma Higgins)	Won

== Philanthropic work ==
Along with the release of her album A Little Vengeance on June 12, 2026, Reyez launched the Jessie Reyez Fund in partnership with PLUS1, with the goal of expanding access to opportunities in the music industry for women and historically underrepresented communities.
