= Savannah Chrisley (influencer) =

American reality television star

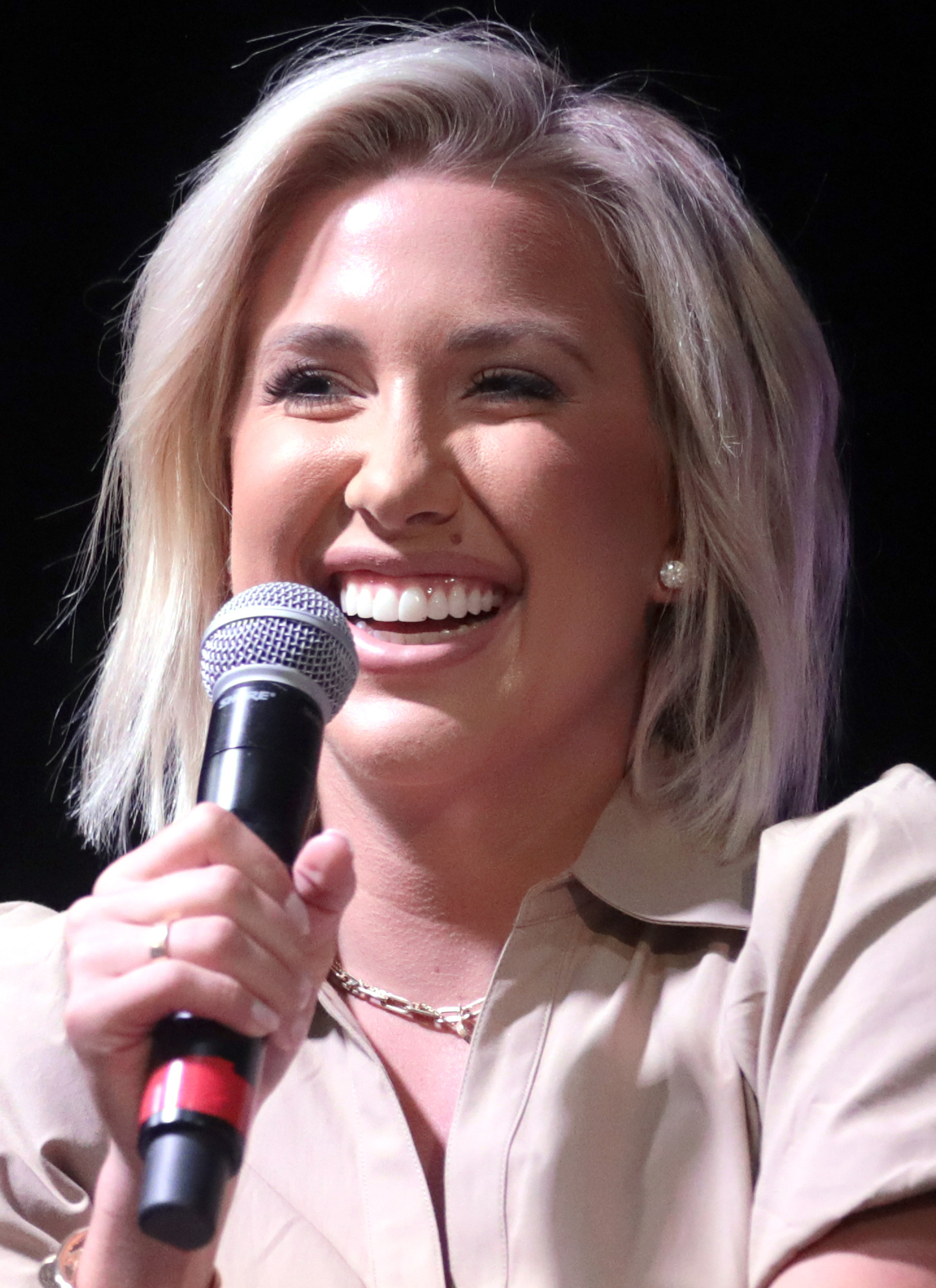
- Chrisley in 2022
- Born: Atlanta, Georgia, U.S.
- Education: Lipscomb University
- Occupations: Reality television star, media personality, podcaster
- Known for: Chrisley Knows Best
- Political party: Republican
- Spouse: Jason Galanis (m. 2026)
- Parent(s): Julie Chrisley; Todd Chrisley

Savannah Chrisley is an American reality television star, media personality and podcaster.

== Life and career ==
Born in Atlanta, Georgia, Chrisley is best known for the reality television series Chrisley Knows Best. She attended Lipscomb University, and was crowned Miss Tennessee Teen USA in 2015. In 2016, Chrisley appeared in the sci-fi television film Sharknado: The 4th Awakens. She started her own podcast, Unlocked with Savannah Chrisley, in October 2022. In March 2024, Chrisley appeared as Afghan Hound on the eleventh American season of The Masked Singer. She was eliminated on episode 2, "Group B: The Wizard Of Oz Night."

In 2025, Chrisley's parents, Julie and Todd, were pardoned by then-President Donald Trump after being convicted of federal charges for tax evasion and bank fraud in June 2022. When her parents were pardoned, Chrisley was quoted in the press saying, "It’s all God and President Trump."

Chrisley started a telehealth company, GoodGirlRX, in 2025.

In February 2026, Chrisley appeared as a guest host on the American daytime talk show The View, which caused controversy and garnered backlash from viewers of the program. In July 2026, Chrisley secretly married her partner Jason Galanis in the Cayman Islands. She is due to give birth to their first child in early 2027.

== Religious and political views ==
Chrisley is a Christian and conservative Republican, who has stated she is a supporter of United States President Donald Trump. Chrisley has publicly defended Trump against accusations of racism.
