= List of Chrisley Knows Best episodes =

Chrisley Knows Best is an American reality television series that premiered on the USA Network on March 11, 2014. It revolves around the lives of Georgia real estate tycoon Todd Chrisley and his wealthy family. The show was filmed in Roswell and Alpharetta, suburbs of Atlanta, before moving primarily to Nashville during the fourth season. In June 2022, Todd Chrisley and his wife Julie Chrisley were found guilty on federal charges of bank fraud and tax evasion and submitting false documents to banks to take out loans and fund their lavish lifestyle. In November 2022, the couple was sentenced to a combined 19 years in prison.

== Series overview ==
Season	Episodes	Originally released	
Season	Episodes	First released	Last released
1	8	March 11, 2014	April 22, 2014
2	13	October 14, 2014	December 17, 2014
3	20	June 2, 2015	December 23, 2015
4	26	March 8, 2016	November 1, 2016
5	25	February 21, 2017	December 19, 2017
6	26	May 8, 2018	December 18, 2018
7	26	May 28, 2019	November 21, 2019
Specials		November 21, 2019	December 24, 2020
8	26	July 9, 2020	March 25, 2021
9	26	August 12, 2021	August 11, 2022
10	8	February 6, 2023	March 27, 2023

== Episodes ==
=== Season 1 (2014) ===
No. overall	No. in season	Title	Original release date	U.S. viewers (millions)
1	1	"Patriarch of Perfection"	March 11, 2014	1.03
Todd Chrisley is the patriarch of the wealthy Chrisley family. He made 95 percent of his wealth in real estate, and his family lives in a 30,000 sq ft (2,800 m^{2}) mansion in a gated neighborhood north of Atlanta. Todd is known to be controlling, and he has strict rules for raising his children. He closely monitors their usage of the Internet and text messaging to keep them out of trouble, and also has tracking devices in their vehicles. After Chase sneaks out to a high school football game against Todd's wishes, Todd disables Chase's vehicle with a wheel clamp and steering-wheel lock. Meanwhile, Todd and Julie are planning a new business venture called Chrisley and Company, a department store. They plan to invest about $2 million in the first store, which is expected to open within the next two months.
2	2	"Not So Sweet Sixteen"	March 11, 2014	0.94
The family is preparing for Savannah's 16th birthday party, but Todd is reluctant to accept that she is growing up, and is against her wearing any skimpy dresses that would attract boys. Todd also believes he must keep an eye on Chase at the party, where there will be girls. During the party, Todd catches Chase leaving with a girl and forces him to return to the festivities. Among the partygoers is Isaac, a football player that Savannah likes, although Todd embarrasses her in front of Isaac. Later, Savannah receives a car as a birthday present.
3	3	"Jugs and Ammo"	March 18, 2014	1.03
Todd and Julie have difficulty bonding with Lindsie's quiet husband Will, and Todd is upset that Will never asked for permission to marry his daughter. Nevertheless, Todd does not hate Will and wants to make an effort to know him better, something that Lindsie wants as well. The two men eventually decide to practice their gunfire at a shooting range, where they form a bond. Meanwhile, Lindsie undergoes breast augmentation.
4	4	"Two Men and a Baby"	March 25, 2014	1.13
Kyle, a recovering drug addict, believes he is ready to be a father to his baby daughter Chloe, who has been in the custody of her mother Angela. Todd has Kyle take a surprise drug test each week to ensure he is drug-free. Kyle has been living in Alpharetta, Georgia with his grandmother Faye Chrisley, and her housemate and friend Catherine, a woman in her 90s. After Faye's husband died, she agreed to take in Catherine and help care for her. Angela agrees to share joint custody of Chloe with Todd and Julie, alternating for two weeks between the two households. Meanwhile, Savannah and Chase go out in her car without getting permission from Todd. In the parking lot of a Zaxby's restaurant, Savannah accidentally runs into a parked car. As a cover story, Savannah and Chase claim they were the ones who took damage from another vehicle. Todd is suspicious and eventually learns the truth from the restaurant manager, who is a friend of his. As punishment, Chase and Savannah must pay for the vehicle damage.
5	5	"Todd-tervention"	April 1, 2014	0.93
The Chrisleys and Catherine travel to Faye's lake house in South Carolina to celebrate Faye's 69th birthday. Todd takes his children's cell phones to encourage more bonding time between the family, although Chase finds and takes his phone back. When Todd finds out, he throws the phone into a lake. Meanwhile, Julie is dismayed when she learns that Faye's surprise party has not been fully set up. Julie recruits her father Harvey and her assistant Tonya to help get the party ready. Faye is happy with her party, which includes 60 guests who came to celebrate, and Chase realizes the importance of socializing with family after seeing the guests.
6	6	"Big Apple Blowup"	April 8, 2014	1.25
Todd travels to New York to buy inventory for the upcoming opening of Chrisley and Company, and he takes Chase and Savannah with him to learn about the fashion industry. However, Chase only wants to admire the women modelling the clothes, and he later sneaks out of the hotel room while Todd is in a meeting. Chase, who is almost 18, wants more freedom. After a talk with Todd, Chase makes an effort to be more involved in the search for inventory, not wanting to disappoint his father. Meanwhile, Julie stays at home and decides to try losing weight. After being diagnosed with breast cancer in 2012 and having the cancer removed, her doctor informed her that keeping her weight down was important for her health, so she decides to take a pole-dancing exercise class.
7	7	"Date Night"	April 15, 2014	1.47
Todd and Julie's children arrange for them to have a spa massage and a dinner, with Chase as their chauffeur. However, the children have forgotten to pay for the spa appointment ahead of time, leaving Todd and Julie to cover the cost. Todd is also unable to relax when the building space for Chrisley and Company is no longer available. Todd reviews several alternatives, but none are satisfactory. The originally chosen space eventually becomes available for Chrisley and Company once again. Meanwhile, Faye signs up for ChristianMingle and goes on a date with a man. Todd and Julie encounter them on their date, and Todd finds it strange to see his mother with a man other than his late father, who died in 2012. Note: This episode is dedicated to Todd's father, Gene Raymond Chrisley.
8	8	"Hey Chloe, It's Your Birthday!"	April 22, 2014	1.47
Todd bets Julie that he can plan Chloe's first birthday as well as she could, and he has to do it without any help. If Todd loses the bet, he has to buy Julie a new jewelry piece. Todd has three days to get the party together, and he secretly gets help from Chase, Savannah and Tonya. Savannah gets pulled over for speeding while driving around for party supplies, and she is forbidden from driving for six months as a result. Todd gets the party together on time, and Julie is impressed with the results. Nevertheless, Todd still buys Julie a new jewelry piece, while also conceding that he had help putting the party together.

=== Season 2 (2014) ===
No. overall	No. in season	Title	Original release date	U.S. viewers (millions)
9	1	"Rules for Dating My Teenage Daughter"	October 14, 2014	1.62
Chloe is now living with the Chrisley family full time, and Julie wants to get back to work as a real estate agent. She meets with her broker friend, Bill, to discuss the current state of the market. Meanwhile, she needs Todd to start helping out more with the children and cooking meals now that she is returning to work. He must also deal with Savannah, who wants permission to go on her first date. Todd is reluctant to agree because she is only 16 and her boyfriend is 19. Todd approves the date on the condition that Faye accompanies the two as a chaperone, and Savannah reluctantly agrees. Savannah's date, former American Idol contestant Spencer Lloyd, arrives to pick her up, and Todd has a stern conversation with Spencer about treating his daughter appropriately. On the date, Faye decides to sit at the restaurant's bar, where she meets a man and has a conversation while drinking. Todd is upset to learn that Faye did not monitor Savannah.
10	2	"Misadventures in Babysitting"	October 14, 2014	1.61
Todd and Julie have to drive to South Carolina to sign paperwork for a contractor to renovate Faye's second home there. They take Chloe with them, but leave Grayson at home in the care of Chase and Savannah, as Grayson has an eye appointment. Chase goes against his parents' wishes by inviting a friend, Tyler, over to the house. Later, Savannah goes out to a salon with a friend, while Chase and Grayson go to play poker at his friend Wyatt's house, even though Chase is only supposed to take Grayson to his eye appointment and then straight back home. Chase bribes Grayson with $100 to stay quiet. On their way to South Carolina, Julie realizes that she left her ID at home, and she needs it to sign off on the paperwork. With their parents now 45 minutes away from home, Savannah, Chase and Grayson rush to beat their parents to the house and ensure that they have done their chores. The children almost get away with their deceit until Todd, who is suspicious, interrogates each of them. Todd offers Grayson immunity from any punishment if he reveals the truth, and he accepts the offer.
11	3	"Father's Day"	October 21, 2014	1.57
For Father's Day, Todd wants to be left alone to have a day of peace. Instead, the family members follow an idea by Grayson to take Todd to a family fun center. Although Todd is initially hesitant to the idea, he winds up having fun. He is also pleased to receive a professional family photo of his children, although Kyle is absent from the photo. Kyle, who is bipolar, has gotten involved in drugs again, a situation that the family has been dealing with since 2009. Todd is upset that Kyle has not contacted him for Father's Day. Later, Faye convinces Todd to have faith that Kyle will eventually turn his life around.
12	4	"Confessions of a Beauty Queen"	October 21, 2014	1.58
With Chase and Savannah moving out soon, the Chrisley family has relocated to a smaller 12,000 sq ft (1,100 m^{2}) house in Atlanta, after 10 years in their old home. The family is stressed about the move, and Julie objects to their use of cussing. Meanwhile, Savannah is preparing to compete in the Miss High School America pageant. She has help from her strict pageant coach Danica, whom Todd dislikes. Todd does not approve of the clothing choices that Savannah and Danica have made, considering them to be too revealing. Savannah is also annoyed by Danica and does not take her coaching seriously, prompting Danica to quit. When Todd finds out, he becomes Savannah's new coach, although he proves to be unbearable. Savannah then meets with Danica to rehire her. The pageant is held a week later, and Savannah represents California because of the family's dual residency there. Although Savannah only manages to place in the top 15, she vows to continue competing in pageants until she wins.
13	5	"Chase Turns 18"	October 28, 2014	1.25
When Chase turns 18, his parents start billing him for his expenses, but they are willing to stop if he will abide by their house rules. Chase refuses and instead moves in with Faye and Catherine. Todd secretly recruits Faye to help in proving to Chase how great life was at home. Faye sends Chase out to buy senior products, and later has him stay at home with Catherine while she goes out to run errands. Chase becomes tired of his new lifestyle and returns home, where he will live for another year before going to college. Meanwhile, Savannah and Tyler are attracted to each other, but Chase is uncomfortable with the idea of them dating. Savannah eventually agrees not to date Tyler for at least a few years.
14	6	"Anger Management"	November 4, 2014	1.42
Savannah damages her car again, this time by accidentally driving into a ditch. The steering is damaged and the repair costs are as high as $15,000, so Todd decides to get rid of the car once the repairs are finished. Meanwhile, Todd discovers he has high blood pressure due to stress, a poor diet, and lack of exercise. To help him relieve his high blood pressure, Julie takes him to a yoga class, while the children have him jog. However, Todd has no interest in either activity. Although the family has been in their new home for a few weeks, they are still waiting for some of their old furniture to arrive. When it does, Todd realizes he can relieve stress by organizing the furniture in the new house.
15	7	"California Chrisleys"	November 11, 2014	1.45
Todd and Julie go on their regular trip to Los Angeles to get their hair done, and they take Faye and the children with them. Todd has rented a Malibu beach house and hopes to bond with the family, but Chase and Savannah have their own plans. Savannah gets her hair cut short, despite Todd's reluctance to the idea, and Chase gets a temporary tattoo. Todd is not ready for his children to grow up, and he does not know what he will do once they have all moved out. Meanwhile, Faye has agreed to sign for a rental Corvette Stingray on Chase's behalf, but she soon takes the vehicle for herself and drives to Palm Springs to have fun.
16	8	"Workin' for a Livin'"	November 18, 2014	1.35
When Chase and Savannah go over their credit limit, Todd makes them get jobs to appreciate their money. Savannah has to work in a clothing store, while Chase works as a caddie at a golf club. Todd and Harvey play a round of golf with Chase as their caddie, but they try to annoy him. Later, Todd accompanies Chase and Savannah to work on a farm.
17	9	"The Great Outdoors"	November 25, 2014	1.14
Todd agrees to take Grayson camping, and Chase comes along too. They rent a large RV and take it to Fort Yargo State Park. Although Todd dislikes the idea of camping, he eventually comes to enjoy it. Meanwhile, Julie and Savannah take a driving test, but they do a poor job of parallel parking and ultimately fail their test. However, they lie to Todd and say that they passed.
18	10	"Marriage Redux"	December 2, 2014	1.78
Todd and Julie try to liven up their marriage by taking a pottery class and a dance class. They have also made plans to spend a romantic night in a hotel room. When they go away, Savannah participates in a sexy photo shoot for the magazine Eide, and keeps it a secret from her parents, knowing that Todd would never approve. Meanwhile, Chase rents a hotel room and invites his friends there for a party. When two exotic dancers arrive at Todd and Julie's hotel room looking for Chase, his parents find out that he is also in the same hotel. Todd ruins Chase's party plans, and Chase realizes he should have found out which hotel his parents were staying at before booking a room for himself. Todd and Julie's romantic evening is spoiled, and they have also received a message from Eide regarding the photo shoot.
19	11	"Houseguest From Hell"	December 9, 2014	1.69
Julie's pregnant friend, Lea, is having work done to her house, and the water has been shut off as a result. Julie offers to let Lea stay at the Chrisley house until the water can be turned back on, even though Todd is easily annoyed by Lea. Upon her arrival, Lea becomes a nuisance to Todd, especially with her excessive eating. In addition, she has to take Todd and Julie's bedroom, as the family does not yet have a bed in their guest room. Meanwhile, Todd and Will still have a dislike for each other, but Todd does not want that to interfere in his relationship with Lindsie and Jackson, so he encourages them to come over for visits more often.
20	12	"Still Chrisley After All These Years"	December 16, 2014	1.47
Todd and Julie are preparing to hold a party to celebrate their 20th wedding anniversary, as well as the second anniversary of Julie being cancer-free. The party will also raise money for the Komen Foundation. Julie wants a small and simple barbecue party, but Todd wants a formal party and insists that it be perfect. Faye is in charge of sending out invitations, but she gets the dates wrong, forcing the family to get the party ready again for the following day. The caterer is unable to provide food to the rescheduled event, so Julie and Tonya attempt to prepare the food themselves, but it proves to be too much work. Eventually, the family is able to get a barbecue restaurant to cater the party, and Savannah has musician Brett Young perform.
21	13	"A Very Chrisley Christmas"	December 17, 2014	1.57
Viewers get a second helping of the Chrisley Family for the holidays, as they gather around the tree to take a look back at some wildly entertaining never-before-seen footage from season two in this hilarious holiday special.

=== Season 3 (2015) ===
No. overall	No. in season	Title	Original release date	U.S. viewers (millions)
22	1	"Savannah's Big Id-ea"	June 2, 2015	2.10
Eide was impressed with Savannah's recent photo shoot and now wants to interview the Chrisley family for an article. Todd hands out script pages for each family member to follow, hoping to impress the magazine with the suggestion of a perfect family. However, the family members dislike the idea of following a script. Meanwhile, Savannah wants Lindsie's ID so she can go out with her friends, and Lindsie reluctantly agrees to let her have it. Later, Lindsie takes the ID back, deciding it was irresponsible to loan it to Savannah. On the day of the interview, the family must deal with a strong odor coming from the garbage disposal. Julie has Harvey come over to fix it, and he has to go out to buy new parts, with little time before the magazine employees arrive to conduct the interview. Todd is upset with the way the interview turns out, as the family goes off script, and Harvey makes loud noises while fixing the garbage disposal.
23	2	"Life's a Pitch"	June 2, 2015	2.25
Julie agrees to host a party for her friend Lea and her fellow singer friends. Julie prepares a large meal ahead of time for the party, but she is dismayed when she discovers that Chase and his friends have eaten the food. The next day, she goes to a Costco with Chase and Savannah to buy more ingredients in order to make the meal again. However, Chase and Savannah get distracted in the store, upsetting Julie further. Julie eventually gets the meal prepared in time for the party. Meanwhile, Todd fills in as the new coach for Grayson's baseball team, but he knows little about sports. The team is disappointed with his coaching, so he hires his friend, baseball player C.J. Stewart, to coach the team.
24	3	"Getting Testy"	June 9, 2015	1.71
The family makes a bet about who can do better on an upcoming ACT test: Chase or Savannah. If Chase wins, he can get a puppy. If Savannah wins, she can go to college a year early. Todd helps Chase study for the test, while Julie helps Savannah. Todd is not ready for his children to leave him, so he is determined to make sure Chase wins the bet. Todd hires a woman to tutor Chase, but Chase is attracted to her and is too distracted to focus. Savannah ultimately scores higher on the ACT test and wins the bet. Meanwhile, Grayson needs to make a miniature volcano as a school project, but Julie does not have time to supervise him, so she has Harvey watch him. Harvey is also too busy to help Grayson, who ends up making the volcano on his own.
25	4	"My Chrisley Valentine"	June 9, 2015	1.74
Todd is upset to learn that Chase has two separate dates for Valentine's Day and has not told them about each other. Todd recruits Savannah in a scheme to teach Chase a lesson, and Savannah's friend Lia allows the two to use her Twitter account. Todd poses as Lia and writes messages to Chase, who cancels one of his earlier dates in order to add Lia as a new one. While Chase is on his first date, he is distracted by a text conversation he is having with Lia on his cell phone. For the date with Lia, Todd has Savannah wear a wig to pose as her, while he poses as a waiter at the restaurant where the date is taking place. Chase arrives and is embarrassed once he sees Savannah and Todd, realizing that he has been pranked. The situation makes Chase realize that he should respect women. Meanwhile, Faye has turned her house into a bed and breakfast in order to raise gambling money. Todd is upset when he finds out, as he does not like the idea of strangers staying with her, but he eventually accepts that she will do whatever she wants.
26	5	"Dollars & Sense"	June 16, 2015	1.29
Faye and Julie have won a trip to a wellness retreat, but they discover it is a place for highly athletic people, and they have difficulty keeping up. Although they dislike the retreat, they enjoy each other's company. Meanwhile, Todd puts Savannah on a budget of $100 a week to show her how to manage her money and prepare her for living on her own. Savannah uses up her weekly allowance for shopping and runs out of gas while driving, forcing Todd to come get her. To pay him back, she gets a job as a dog walker and has also agreed to pick up Jackson from school in exchange for money. Savannah becomes too occupied with the dogs to pick up Jackson, so she sends Chase to retrieve him. However, Chase demands payment from Savannah in return, and Lindsie declines to hire Savannah again after her failure to pick up Jackson. To pay off both Todd and Chase, Savannah decides to hold a garage sale and sell some of her beloved clothing. Todd is proud of Savannah for parting ways with the clothing to earn the money.
27	6	"Chrisleys on Campus"	June 16, 2015	1.45
Todd, Julie and Chase accompany Savannah to visit a potential college, Lipscomb University, in Nashville. They stop to eat in Murfreesboro, Tennessee, but Todd loses the key to his vehicle afterwards. He calls Faye and wants her to drive out and bring them a spare key, but she has been drinking wine and is unable to drive out until the next day. The family reluctantly stays in an inn operated by a woman who owns three cats. Faye drives out the next day, and she decides to accompany the family to Nashville for a tour of the college. Savannah is embarrassed to have Todd on the tour. That night, Savannah goes out line dancing with some people she met at the college. Todd, out of concern, puts on a disguise and follows Savannah to see if she is really line dancing, and she is further embarrassed when she realizes he is watching her. Todd returns to Julie in the hotel and becomes emotional about the children growing up. Later, Savannah is accepted into Lipscomb University, and Chase decides he too will attend a college, after previously considering his options.
28	7	"Nurse Todd"	June 23, 2015	1.40
Savannah develops appendicitis and has to have her appendix removed. Todd is happy to care for Savannah during her recovery, because he feels like he is needed. He also wants to pamper her so she will miss him when she is away at college. However, Savannah starts taking advantage of Todd to have him do things for her, even after she becomes well enough to do them on her own. Meanwhile, Chase wants to get involved in real estate like his father did, so Todd arranges for Chase to assist his broker friend, Bill Rawlings, during an open house. Although Chase is initially confident, he realizes during the open house that he is not fully prepared to answer the questions of potential clients. Chase makes an effort to be informed about the property for the next open house, and he winds up impressing Bill.
29	8	"College Bootcamp"	June 30, 2015	1.29
When Todd and Julie learn that Chase paid a stranger to change his flat tire, they realize that he and Savannah are lacking basic life skills. Todd tries teaching them how to change a tire, but they do not understand. Later, Todd gives them advice about sex. Todd and Julie then take them to a laundromat so they can learn how to get their clothes cleaned. Todd also takes them to a self-defense class, and then has Lindsie advise them on what life will be like at college. Meanwhile, Todd and Julie are tired of Grayson sleeping with them every night rather than in his own bed. Todd redecorates Grayson's room to give it a baseball theme, which Grayson likes. However, he is still apprehensive about sleeping alone. Todd and Julie are surprised when Chase turns out to be the solution to their problem, by talking to Grayson and convincing him that he will be fine sleeping by himself.
30	9	"Rules of Engagement"	July 7, 2015	1.59
Todd is upset to find out that Savannah has been seeing a man, a Nashville musician named Blaire, without his permission. Todd agrees to give Savannah some space for three days so she can peacefully spend time with Blaire and also prepare him for an upcoming dinner with Todd and the family. In the meantime, Todd secretly runs background checks on Blaire in all 50 states and spies on the couple. After Todd meets Blaire at dinner, he agrees not to interfere so much in Savannah's relationship with him. Meanwhile, Chase has an idea to start a golf cart taxi service for drunk college students, and he wants Todd to invest in the idea. Chase and Parker create a presentation to pitch the idea to Todd. Although Todd is somewhat impressed with their effort, he declines to invest the required $75,000 into the idea because the cost is too high.
31	10	"Failure to Launch"	July 14, 2015	1.53
Julie has started a food blog, but she is upset when no one "likes" her recipes. Julie agrees to Todd's idea of hiring a chef who can help improve her cooking. However, they both are annoyed by the chef's criticism. Later, Todd reluctantly accompanies Julie to a French restaurant, where she samples the food in hopes of gaining insight on how to become a better cook. Todd is disgusted by many of the French dishes and declines to eat most of them. Julie subsequently prepares various French dishes at home, but the family is appalled by the food. Some time later, Julie prepares another meal consisting of her classic dishes, while incorporating aspects of French cooking. The family enjoys her latest meal, and they also discover that Julie's blog is still in a preview mode and that she had not yet submitted it to the Internet. Meanwhile, two-year-old Chloe has become a difficult child for Chase and Savannah to babysit, although Todd does not believe she is that bad.
32	11	"Midlife Chrisley"	July 21, 2015	1.77
Todd is turning 47 soon, and Chase and Savannah continually make jokes about his age. Todd is dismayed when his plastic surgeon agrees that he is showing his age. Meanwhile, Faye gets glamour shots taken of herself as a birthday gift to Todd, to show him that older people can still be attractive even at age 70. Chase and Savannah trick Todd into spending his birthday party at a senior living home, as another way of mocking his age. Later, Todd buys a motorcycle as part of an apparent midlife crisis. He subsequently decides to get several plastic surgeries done on his face. Chase and Savannah realize they have taken their jokes too far, but Todd proceeds with the surgeries despite their insistence that he looks fine. Todd returns home in a wheelchair, with his face wrapped in bandages. After making Chase and Savannah feel bad, Todd reveals that he has been pranking them and did not really have any surgery done.
33	12	"Dude Ranch"	July 21, 2015	1.88
Grayson is happy that he and the rest of the family will spend a couple days at a dude ranch for his ninth birthday, although Todd does not like the idea, as he considers himself a city person. Todd is upset that the family has to do chores on the ranch before they can eat, and is further upset by the lack of showers on the property. That night, Todd catches Chase, Savannah and Lindsie trying to sneak off the ranch, and he convinces them that they have to stay to avoid upsetting Grayson. The next day, Todd cannot handle being at the ranch any longer and attempts to leave, before Chase reminds him that they have to stay for Grayson.
34	13	"Chrisleys Take London"	November 10, 2015	1.86
The Chrisleys travel to London for vacation, to celebrate Chase and Savannah's graduation. However, Todd is apprehensive about leaving the United States, something that his father always warned him not to do for the sake of his safety. Todd has rented a bus for the family to tour London, although they become bored and want to walk around. Todd reluctantly agrees, but he winds up losing many of his family members when they abandon him at Trafalgar Square to have fun without him. Chase and Faye go to a pub, while Julie and Savannah go to have high tea. The next day, Todd agrees to let Julie, Chase, Savannah and Chloe go out on their own without him, although they become worried when they realize a man is following them. Julie contacts Todd and discovers that he paid the man to monitor them for their safety. Later, Faye takes Todd to see the Korean War Memorial, where she convinces him that the reason his father fought in the war was so his future family could live without fear. Todd partially overcomes his paranoia about being in a foreign country, and the family later gets on the London Eye observation wheel.
35	14	"Lord Chrisley"	November 17, 2015	1.60
Still on vacation in England, Todd takes the family to stay at a palace called Stanford Hall. The palace includes a butler, but Chase and Savannah are upset by the lack of Wi-Fi, and they misbehave during dinner. Chase is also upset because their stay at the palace coincides with his birthday, and it is not how he wanted to celebrate. Meanwhile, Todd feels comfortable in the palace and wonders if he was a lord in a past life. He decides to live like a lord and tries to instill royal values in his family by hiring an etiquette expert to teach them proper manners. Later, the family dresses up in old-fashioned clothing to take a picture that will be featured on their Christmas cards. However, the clothing is itchy and has an odor, and Todd wonders how many people before him have worn the clothes. Todd has also been starving himself during the family's stay at the palace because he does not like the food that is served there. Todd ultimately decides to give up his idea of living like a lord, and the family eventually returns to their home.
36	15	"Love and Marriage"	November 24, 2015	1.37
Julie wants Todd and herself to star in a video about their relationship that will serve as a memento to their children. Todd and Julie must take a compatibility test first, to give the videographer an idea of who they are, but the test reveals issues with their relationship. Todd is displeased with how unorganized Julie is, and she is upset that he lacks spontaneity and rarely sends her flowers. Upon these discoveries, Julie hires an assistant to help keep her organized, and Todd sends Julie dozens of flowers, although she feels that he went overboard with the amount. Meanwhile, Chase's college classes have yet to start, and he wants to get an apartment in the meantime to get away from his parents. Todd refuses to help pay for the apartment, so Chase decides to move into Todd's garage, with help from Parker. Chase hopes to annoy Todd enough that Todd will pay for the apartment to get rid of him. The videographer arrives to film Todd and Julie, who try to convey a perfect image of themselves and their marriage. During the shoot, they discover that Chase has moved into the garage, and the situation convinces them to be themselves. Todd and Julie are satisfied with the video when it is finished, and Todd forces Chase to move out of the garage, while still refusing to pay for an apartment.
376	16	"Sports Day"	December 1, 2015	1.27
Bill Rawlings is holding his annual barbecue party and athletic games, and the Chrisley family is among others who have been invited to participate again. Savannah has broken her foot after trying to jump a fence, but she is still eager to win the games and has agreed to participate. Todd is also eager to win, after the family lost the previous year. He makes the family practice hard, and he also sends Grayson to the Rawlings house for a play date with Bill's son Carter, hoping to gain intelligence on what kind of games Bill has planned for the event. Julie is upset that Todd is using their son as a spy, although her competitive side comes out on the day of the games. The final game of the event consists of a race, but Savannah loses because of her broken foot. It is up to Chase to win the final race and the trophy, but he also loses.
38	17	"Hometown Hero"	December 8, 2015	1.69
Todd's closet has become infested with flying squirrels. Until the animals are trapped, Todd takes the family to their house in Seneca, South Carolina, where he and Julie grew up. Todd wants to teach his children about their family history, although Savannah is not interested. Later, Todd and Julie take the children to their friend Bill Abbott's house, where the couple met each other. Bill wants Todd to attend a reunion of their high school friends, some of whom Todd has not seen since graduating. However, Todd is reluctant to attend because he does not want his children to learn what kind of antics he got into as a teenager, as he has always tried to be a good role model for them. At the reunion, Chase and Savannah are shocked when they learn that Todd drank alcohol as a teenager and was involved in various sexual relationships. Later, the children are taken to the abandoned textile mill where Todd had once worked for six years, while Faye worked there for 39 years, and Gene for 30 years. Faye becomes emotional being there again and wants to leave, saying she has had enough of the place after working there for so long. The children develop an appreciation for how hard their family has worked.
39	18	"The Graduates"	December 15, 2015	1.33
Todd wants Chase to give a speech at his and Savannah's upcoming graduation party, but Chase has a fear of public speaking. To help him get over his fear, Todd takes Chase to a Toastmasters International meeting to give a speech. Meanwhile, Todd has arranged for Blaire to show up at the graduation party as a surprise for Savannah. However, Todd learns the next day that the couple had a fight the night before, as Savannah does not approve of him going out drinking with his friends. Todd still wants Blaire to show up to the party, but Blaire's presence there becomes uncertain as he does not answer Todd's phone calls. Blaire ultimately arrives just in time to perform a song, with the lyrics acknowledging Savannah's concerns. The couple reconcile, and Chase successfully gives his speech. Todd is happy for his children, but is also sad that they are growing up.
40	19	"A Very Chrisley Christmas 2"	December 22, 2015	1.84
41	20	"Leaving the Nest"	December 23, 2015	1.48

=== Season 4 (2016) ===
No. overall	No. in season	Title	Original release date	U.S. viewers (millions)
42	1	"Crowning Achievements"	March 8, 2016	1.43
Savannah has recently won the Miss Tennessee Teen USA pageant, but Todd is upset that a work commitment prevented him from being at the event to witness her victory. Savannah is attending Lipscomb University and Chase is attending college in Georgia. Todd is depressed by their absence, and when they come to visit him, he decides to throw a party for Savannah. She agrees to a small party, but he goes overboard and intends for the event to serve as a reenactment of her pageant win, giving him a chance to experience what he missed before. At the party, Savannah declines to wear her pageant dress, and she jokingly credits everyone else but Todd for her pageantry success. When she later realizes that she hurt his feelings, she cheers him up by putting on her pageant outfit for him to see, and by arranging for them to pose for a photoshoot. Meanwhile, Chase wants his parents to pay for new clothing for him, but they refuse. He then pays Grayson $100 to help steal some clothes from Todd, but the scheme is uncovered when Savannah becomes suspicious and pays Grayson $200 to reveal what he is hiding.
43	2	"The Wrath of Todd"	March 15, 2016	1.50
Todd and Julie are outraged that Savannah is failing her Bible classes, so Todd arranges for her to teach a Sunday school class. Meanwhile, Chase decides to get a tattoo, despite his father's dislike of them. Chase gets a tattoo of the John 3:16 Bible verse, believing that Todd will not object. However, he misjudges Todd's reaction. Chase likes Todd's Range Rover, so Todd makes a deal with him: if Chase gets the tattoo removed, he will receive the Range Rover in return. Chase goes in for a painful segment of laser tattoo removal, something that he will have to continue doing for the next year to get the tattoo fully removed.
44	3	"Todd Unleashed"	March 22, 2016	1.51
Savannah travels from her Nashville condo to Atlanta to celebrate Jackson's third birthday. However, she is forced to bring her puppy, Dior, along as she could not find a dog sitter. Todd dislikes animals, so Savannah has not even told him about her dog. At Todd's house, she tries to keep Dior hidden away, but the family soon finds out, and Todd shuns Savannah out of anger that she kept the dog a secret from him. Meanwhile, Chase is tired of living with his sloppy college roommates, and he wants a condo of his own like Savannah. He has found a potential condo and wants to split the purchase and eventual revenue with Todd, who initially is not interested. Chase later takes Todd out for a spa day to get away from Savannah and Dior, and Todd agrees to look at the condo to avoid the dog further. Todd is impressed with the condo and decides to buy it himself, while offering Chase the chance to rent it. Chase is upset that he will not get a profit out of the condo. Todd returns home to find that Savannah has gone back to her condo, after feeling unwanted in his house. Julie does not like unresolved family issues, so Todd goes to Savannah's condo and reconciles. Savannah reveals that she bought Dior because she was lonely, and Todd later discusses an idea with Julie about moving to Nashville to be closer to Savannah.
45	4	"Lights, Camera, Chase"	March 29, 2016	1.41
Chase is a broadcast journalism major in college, but he dislikes his boring classes and wants to start making money right away. He gets an internship job at People TV, a public-access television channel in Atlanta, although he is upset that Todd insisted on going with him to the job interview. Chase has to help feed and clean animals before their appearance on one of the channel's programs. Chase finds the experience unsettling, so he suggests an idea for his own show, which is approved by the channel's managing director. Chase's program focuses on helicopter parents, and Todd unexpectedly arrives on-set to give his perspective as a parent. Ultimately, Todd is proud of Chase's show. Meanwhile, Julie and Faye go to an Italian restaurant and find their waiter, Enrico, to be handsome. They learn that Enrico has an 84-year-old grandfather named Guido in Italy, and Faye becomes interested in meeting him. Faye takes online lessons to learn Italian, but it does not go over well, so she has Enrico teach her instead. Todd dislikes the idea of his mother travelling to Italy to meet a stranger, although he allows the two to meet online through a video chat.
46	5	"Runaway Faye"	April 5, 2016	1.42
Faye has accidentally twisted her ankle while out gambling at a casino, and Todd insists that she recover at his house, to which she reluctantly agrees. Todd believes that Faye should end her gambling and become a good Christian woman who is free of sin, although she says there is nothing in the Bible to suggest that gambling is forbidden. Meanwhile, Todd and Julie are tired of Grayson spending so much time with his computer and video games. They give him a choice of doing chores or getting a hobby; although he chooses chore work, he does not take it seriously. Faye soon regrets coming to stay with Todd, and she and Grayson contact Chase to come pick them up and take them away from Todd's house. However, Todd catches them before they can make their escape. Julie helps convince Todd that he has to stop treating his mother like a child and start letting her live her own life. Meanwhile, Julie gets Grayson a drum set as a hobby, although Todd is irritated by the noise.
47	6	"Moving On"	April 12, 2016	1.46
After 15 years in Atlanta, Todd and Julie have decided to move to Nashville to be closer to Savannah. However, Grayson is sad about having to move away from his friends and start a new school, so the family celebrates his final week in Atlanta to cheer him up. Julie takes Grayson to his favorite restaurant, Red Lobster, and the family later takes him to an indoor trampoline park to spend time with his friends. Todd is against having Grayson's friends spend the night at the Chrisley house, but he agrees to the idea when Julie volunteers Savannah to monitor the sleepover. Although Savannah does not want to help, she eventually realizes that she will need to be around for Grayson more often now to help him through this transition. Todd is happy that Faye, Chase and Lindsie will still have each other for company in Atlanta. Meanwhile, Chase and Parker go out shopping and are surprised to see how expensive shoes can be. They decide that they should start donating their sperm to make money, but they opt out when they discover that they would only earn $100 for each donation.
48	7	"Too Close for Comfort"	May 10, 2016	1.69
The Chrisley family is getting settled in their new home in Nashville. Todd and Julie discover that Savannah lied when she said she was busy studying, as she actually went out to eat with her friends. Later, Todd investigates Savannah's recent behavior and learns that she has also reconciled with Blair, something she has withheld from the family. Although Todd is concerned about Savannah, she tells him that she needs to live her own life and make her own mistakes so she can learn from them, and Todd agrees to let her have her space. Meanwhile, Grayson is happy when Julie takes him to a wrestling venue to watch matches. Later, Grayson challenges Chase to a wrestling match, which Grayson wins.
49	8	"Smoothie Operator"	May 17, 2016	1.51
Todd wants to invest in his new community, so he decides to open a juice and smoothie bar called the Juice Bar, part of a franchise chain. Todd wants Chase and Savannah to work at the Juice Bar to understand hard work, and the business will also become theirs after Todd dies. Before the Juice Bar's grand opening, the family receives help from two corporate trainers on how to operate the business. However, Chase does not take the job seriously, which upsets Todd. Meanwhile, Grayson owes Nanny Faye $20 for a bet they made on a sports game. Grayson makes a "double or nothing" bet with Nanny, but she wins again. When Todd discovers that Faye has taken Grayson's iPad as payment, he orders both of them to stop betting.
50	9	"Chase in Charge"	May 24, 2016	1.20
Todd accompanies Julie to Los Angeles, where she is having a liposuction surgery, although they are hesitant about leaving their children behind for the weekend. Chase is left in charge of the Juice Bar, but he hires Nanny Faye to fill in for him so he can relax. In Los Angeles, Todd stands by Julie's side during the surgery, but he becomes nauseous while she is having fat drained from her body. Julie and Todd are impressed with the results, although she is required to stay in Los Angeles for a three-day recovery period, longer than initially expected. Todd and Julie contact Chase to see how life is going in Nashville, and they subsequently suspect that Chase is neglecting his job duties. Todd decides to fly back home a day early, and he is upset when he finds that Chase was lying and has hired Faye to work at the Juice Bar in his place.
51	10	"Family Matters"	May 31, 2016	1.44
Chase and Savannah have continued their usual bickering, even while working in front of customers at the Juice Bar, so Todd arranges for them to go through a team building obstacle course to learn how to work together. However, their arguing gets in the way of completing their goal, and Chase eventually gives up. Meanwhile, Julie goes to Atlanta for the night to retrieve some things from storage, to help complete their move to Nashville. The next day, Julie informs Todd that his mother has found a breast lump and is undergoing tests to determine if it is breast cancer. Todd becomes emotional at the idea of his mother not being around anymore, although her tests reveal that she is fine. Following her health scare, Faye agrees to spend some time in Nashville with the family, and they put together a casino night for her to enjoy, with gambling tables operated by the Chrisley children. The casino night helps bring Chase and Savannah together as a team.
52	11	"Goat Farm Yourself"	June 7, 2016	1.50
Todd sends Chase and Savannah to work on a goat farm in Franklin, Tennessee, hoping they will learn several things: the value of hard work, appreciation for their privileged lifestyle, and how to work as a team. Savannah takes somewhat of a liking to the farm chores, but Chase dislikes animals. Instead, Chase helps make goat milk soap, an experience he finds more pleasant. Later, he uses his charm to sell the soap at a farmers' market.
53	12	"Todd Goes Country"	June 14, 2016	1.27
Todd wants Julie to plan a party that will launch a country music career of his, although in reality he is having her plan her own birthday party without telling her. Todd has chosen Julie to prepare the event because he considers her the best party planner there is, although she is upset about having to plan a party on her own birthday. Todd is planning to sing a song for Julie at her party. Shane Stevens and Nash Overstreet write the song, which is later recorded by Todd along with Sara Evans. However, during the recording session, Todd strains his voice. He later learns that he has a flu, and Julie wants to cancel the party as a result. Todd informs Savannah of the surprise party, and she is tasked with making sure Julie does not cancel it. Meanwhile, Todd gets IV treatments to improve his flu symptoms in time for the party. The event is held at the George Jones Museum, where Todd reveals that the party is for Julie. Todd is also well enough to perform the duet with Sara Evans, and Julie enjoys the song.
54	13	"Hawaii Love You So"	August 23, 2016	1.85
Todd and Julie are celebrating their 20th anniversary in Maui, and they bring Faye and their children with them. Savannah and Lindsie go horse riding on a ranch, while Faye gambles and drinks alcohol with cowboys. Todd has a tendency to use his cell phone to check up frequently on his children, but Julie wants him to put his phone away so they can relax together. Todd books them for a quiet and romantic evening cruise, but it turns out to be a party cruise with electronic dance music. Later, Julie becomes upset with Todd when she learns he has secretly been checking on the children. She leaves him to have dinner by herself, but Todd redeems himself the next day. He takes the family ATV riding, and later surprises Julie with a renewal of their wedding vows.
55	14	"Don't Kale Yourself"	August 23, 2016	1.79
Lindsie does not want to bring Jackson over to her parents' house anymore because of their poor diet habits, so they agree to try a healthier lifestyle. Lindsie removes junk food from their house and puts the family through a fitness workout. Later, Todd and Julie go to a farmers market, where they secretly eat donuts and grilled cheese sandwiches. However, Grayson reveals this to Lindsie, who is disappointed that they went back to unhealthy foods. Julie later agrees to try one of Lindsie's healthy recipes, and Todd is unable to taste a difference from Julie's regular meals. Meanwhile, Chase gets his wisdom teeth removed and is delirious from the pain medication.
56	15	"Todd's Not Dead"	August 30, 2016	1.94
Todd decides to plan his own funeral in order to ensure that it is done right for when he dies, although the family believes it is a crazy idea. Todd holds a rehearsal funeral at a church and has his children give their thoughts on him. Meanwhile, Todd is upset that Savannah has been neglecting her community service requirements that come with being Miss Tennessee Teen USA. He signs her up to help out at an animal shelter, but she is disgusted when she has to clean fecal matter on her first day. She eventually begins to enjoy the other work at the shelter, and decides to hold an animal adoption event with help from Grayson.
57	16	"Colon All Cards"	September 6, 2016	1.82
Julie has an upcoming appointment for a colonoscopy, which can help detect cancer, and she convinces Todd to get the procedure with her. However, he only trusts their doctor in Atlanta to do the procedure, and they will not be able to drive after having it done, meaning that Faye will have to pick them up at the hospital afterwards. Savannah will watch Grayson in Nashville while their parents go to have the colonoscopy. Todd dislikes the preparation that is required ahead of time, as it causes frequent defecation. On the day of the colonoscopy, Todd discovers that Faye is busy playing in a card game. Instead, Todd and Julie have Savannah and Grayson come to Atlanta with them, as Savannah will now have to drive them once the procedure is done. On the way to Atlanta, Todd and Julie have to keep stopping to use bathrooms. Todd also sends Lindsie to pull Faye out of the card game. Lindsie believes that Faye has a gambling addiction, so she takes her to a hypnotist hoping to end the addiction. Faye informs the hypnotist that she and her late husband used to always go gambling together. After the hypnosis session, Faye says that while she has no desire to gamble today, she will probably continue the habit in the future. She also apologizes for not picking up Todd and Julie.
58	17	"You Can't Handle the Truce"	September 13, 2016	1.92
It has been two years since Todd and Will went to the gun range, and although they bonded at the time, they have not spoken since then. Todd is still bitter that Will never asked for permission to marry his daughter, but Lindsie wants the two to make up. Todd and Julie have an awkwardly quiet lunch with Lindsie and Will. Julie subsequently agrees that she and Todd will come to Lindsie and Will's new house in Canton for dinner, despite Todd's resistance to the idea. While there, Todd and Will bond as they put together a play set for Jackson. Will also apologizes for not asking for Todd's marital permission, and Todd forgives him. Meanwhile, Grayson has a crush on a girl named Shelby and he seeks advice from Savannah about girls. Later, Grayson goes on a date with Shelby for ice cream, and they agree to go on a second date in the future.
59	18	"Review and Renew"	September 20, 2016	1.72
Chase and Savannah think the Juice Bar should have more reviews, so Todd decides to shoot a commercial to help promote it. The commercial stars Chase, Savannah, Grayson and Faye, who are dressed in costumes as fruits and vegetables. However, they dislike Todd's handling of the commercial, and Chase thinks a billboard would have been a better way to promote the Juice Bar. Ultimately, they get help from Savannah's director friend, Chad, who fine-tunes the commercial. Todd is impressed with the final result. Meanwhile, Julie spends time with Lea, her friend from Atlanta. Lea is considering a procedure known as vaginal rejuvenation, and Julie accompanies her to a doctor consultation. Julie then considers having the procedure done herself, until Todd says that she does not need it.
60	19	"Go Flip Yourself"	September 27, 2016	1.83
Chase and Parker decide to flip Harvey's former house on their own, although it proves to be too much work, so they get help from Todd's contractor. Todd is impressed with the results, considering it is their first flip. Meanwhile, Bill Abbott visits the Chrisley family, but Julie is annoyed to be the target of his and Todd's juvenile pranks. Later, Julie, Faye and Savannah go out to play drag queen bingo. Feeling bad for Julie, Todd decides that he and Bill will dress up as drag queens and attend the bingo game, making themselves a laughingstock instead of Julie.
61	20	"Message in a Bottle Rocket"	October 4, 2016	1.71
The Chrisley family travels to a resort to celebrate the Fourth of July, and Chase's friend Parker comes along. Todd arranges for everyone to play a search and rescue game, in which they must go on a scavenger hunt for clues that will lead them to an injured victim who needs help. The family is divided into four teams: Todd and Faye, Julie and Grayson, Chase and Parker, and Savannah and Lindsie. Chase and Parker have no desire to play the game, so they secretly drop out to have a relaxing day instead. They subsequently buy fireworks to put on a show for the family later. During the scavenger hunt, Savannah and Lindsie cheat by taking clues that were meant for Todd and Faye. Julie and Grayson also cheat by taking their clues. In addition, Todd is slowed down by Faye. Savannah and Lindsie ultimately win the game. Although Todd is upset that Chase abandoned the game, he appreciates the fireworks show.
62	21	"Crowning Around"	October 11, 2016	1.84
The family travels to Las Vegas for Savannah's participation in the 2016 Miss Teen USA pageant. They stay at the Venetian resort, where the event is being held. Julie is concerned that Savannah is not fully prepared for the pageant, and Todd begins to share her concern when they put Savannah through practice, which reveals that she may not be entirely prepared. Her parents later apologize for trying so hard to make sure she is ready. Meanwhile, Chase is in charge of monitoring Nanny Faye and keeping her out of trouble. She wants to gamble, but Chase is under the age of 21 and is not allowed to accompany her to the casino. Nanny has been feeling sad after the recent death of Catherine, but Nanny believes that Catherine would want her to continue living her life and having fun. Nanny wants to see a Las Vegas show, so Chase takes her to a male strip show, which she enjoys. Later, Nanny and Chase upgrade to a presidential suite through her comps. On the night of the pageant, Savannah manages to come in the top 15, but she does not make it as one of the top five finalists. Although she is upset, her family encourages her that she did well and will be okay.
63	22	"Pretty in Print"	October 11, 2016	1.72
64	23	"Truth or Chair"	October 18, 2016	1.88
Faye has been upset following Catherine's death, so Todd has her move in with the family and away from Atlanta, allowing him to monitor her now that she is older. However, they soon become annoyed with each other, and she gets a job as a fast-food cashier in order to get out of the house and away from him. Eventually, Todd decides to get Faye her own apartment in Nashville, giving her the independence she wants, while still keeping her nearby. Meanwhile, Todd and Chase agree to take a lie detector test to see who is more truthful. Savannah finds out she is not Todd's favorite child, and Chase is shocked to learn that Todd was never a Calvin Klein model. Ultimately, Chase is found to be more honest.
65	24	"Rent Controlled"	October 25, 2016	1.57
Savannah pursues her longtime dream of becoming a fashion designer. She has begun working on a clothing line that will eventually launch on the Home Shopping Network. She also believes she is ready to buy a house of her own, but she needs a 20-percent down payment from Todd, and he wants a house that matches his own preference. He eventually agrees to back off a little and let Savannah buy the house she wants, without having to redesign it to suit his style. Meanwhile, Grayson has overused his cellphone data and now owes Todd $193. He gets a job as a paperboy to pay off the debt, but later decides to start his own business by renting out his video games and DVDs, making a much larger profit.
66	25	"A Very Grisly Chrisley"	November 1, 2016	1.68
The Chrisleys learn that their new neighborhood in Nashville hosts a competition each Halloween to see who can decorate their house the best. Todd and Julie decide to compete, as it will give them a chance to meet their neighbors, although Todd is more interested in beating them in the competition. Julie wants to create homemade decorations, but Todd would rather buy decorations from a store. They ultimately compromise and do both, but with more of an emphasis on store-bought decorations. Meanwhile, Lindsie comes from Atlanta to visit the family. She and Will have separated after growing apart, and she is reluctant to tell her family, afraid of how Todd will react. She ultimately tells Todd and Julie, who comfort her and agree to support her however they can. Later, Todd is pleased to see Lindsie happily participating in the Halloween preparations. The family dresses up in costumes as part of their house presentation, but they lose to a rival.
67	26	"The House That Todd Built"	November 1, 2016	1.60
Todd signs the family up for an organization that modifies houses, making them more accessible for people with disabilities or special needs. The Chrisleys and others help a single mother of four girls by renovating their house, making it more accessible for one of the girls, who suffered brain damage after a pool incident years ago. Chase and Faye make a bet about which of them can work harder on the project, but they later call a truce. On the first day, Todd mostly oversees the work being done by other members of his family. He is upset that the family is not working as hard as he would like, and they are annoyed by his managerial behavior. He later acknowledges that he micromanaged them, and he works alongside them from that point forward. Meanwhile, Grayson must document his family history for a school project. Faye insists that she is part Cherokee Indian through her great-great-grandmother, although Todd questions this claim. He has Faye take a DNA saliva test to trace her ancestry, and he confirms that she is not Cherokee Indian. However, he decides to let her continue believing that she is, because it makes her happy.

=== Season 5 (2017) ===
No. overall	No. in season	Title	Original release date	U.S. viewers (millions)
68	1	"50 Shades of Faye"	February 21, 2017	1.97
Chase has bought a condo in Atlanta and Savannah has bought a house in Nashville. They both need furniture for their new residences, so Todd has them bid on items in his storage unit. Faye and Chase also compete for a couch, but Chase wins it in the bidding. He has Parker and Ronndell help to move the couch into his condo, but it will not fit in the elevator leading up to his unit. He decides to give the couch to Savannah, but she no longer needs one, so he gives it to Faye instead. Meanwhile, Faye has started online dating again. Todd wants to chaperone Faye on her dates, but she does not like that idea, so she sneaks off without him. When Todd finds out, he goes to the restaurant where she is meeting two dates, at separate times. Her first date is a man who is around 50 years old, about the same age as Todd. Faye's first date leaves after becoming uncomfortable with Todd being there. Faye's second date, Roger, is closer to her own age, and Todd is somewhat accepting of him.
69	2	"Client-Hell"	February 28, 2017	1.83
Savannah is in a music business class, and she is tasked with developing and managing an artist and booking them a show. She had an artist already chosen, but they dropped out of the project at the last minute. Instead, she is forced to take on Todd as her new music client, and he decides to behave as an overbearing musician to show her how difficult her job could be. At one point, Todd expresses dissatisfaction with Savannah's choice of venue. As revenge for his behavior, Savannah instead books him to perform at a senior home. Meanwhile, Chase has made a bet with Savannah that he can cook a better meal for the family than her. With help from Parker, Chase rushes to prepare a dinner for the family at his condo in Atlanta. Although Todd enjoyed Savannah's meal, he declares Chase the winner of the bet. As the loser, Savannah must pay for Chase's groceries for a month.
70	3	"Bunions, Bulldogs and Hedgehogs, Oh My!"	March 7, 2017	2.01
Julie has had bunion surgery and will need two weeks to recover before she can fully walk again. In the meantime, Todd must take over her usual duties. Todd also learns that the family must watch after Sunshine, a hedgehog that belongs to Grayson's friend Chris. Julie had already agreed to look after the pet for Chris' family, who are going out of town. Todd becomes overwhelmed by his new chores, so he has Chase come from Atlanta to help him. Chase brings his beloved bulldog Lilo along, despite Todd's disapproval. Todd restricts Lilo to the garage, and Chase declines to help Todd with the chores unless he accepts Lilo as a member of the family. When Sunshine goes missing, Todd is forced to allow Lilo inside the house so that Chase will agree to help him look for the hedgehog. They are unsuccessful in locating Sunshine, so they go to a pet store, but they learn that buying a replacement hedgehog will be a difficult task. Upon returning home to confess to Julie, Todd learns that Grayson had been playing with Sunshine in his room. Later, Todd fully accepts Lilo into his home and finds her to be a cute dog.
71	4	"Market Crash"	March 14, 2017	1.95
Savannah has gotten into her fourth car accident, crashing into a guard rail after trying to adjust her floor mat, which had rolled up over the brake pedal. She is now wearing a neck brace and has been advised to have a supervised recovery at her parents' home. Todd gives her a set of questions to test her driving knowledge, but she fails them. The family later takes Savannah to an auto yard to see her wrecked car, which helps her realize how serious the accident was, and convinces her that she has to be a better driver. Meanwhile, Todd gives Chase a $1,000 budget to market the Juice Bar, and Chase recruits Ronndell to come up with ideas on how to use the money. Ultimately, they decide to hold a comedy night at the Juice Bar, with Ronndell, a comedian, as the performer, Todd is proud of Chase when the comedy night proves to be a financial success.
72	5	"Mannequin Challenge"	March 21, 2017	1.80
Savannah is preparing her upcoming fashion line, and she needs to organize a focus group to get ideas on what kind of clothing the line will sell. Although Savannah is still recovering from her auto accident, she wants to handle the focus group on her own. However, she eventually realizes that she needs help, so she turns to her family. Among her tasks is putting together mannequins, which Todd later transports to the focus group venue. Savannah is pleased with the focus group and the results. Meanwhile, Chase's condo HOA informs him of noise complaints regarding Lilo, who suffers separation anxiety and howls whenever Chase leaves her. Parker arranges for Lilo and Chase to meet a dog trainer at a dog park, but other dogs interfere in the training process. Later, Chase and Lilo try dog yoga, an idea suggested by Lindsie, but it also fails to calm Lilo. Chase eventually gets Lilo an anxiety vest which soothes her, and he later learns that the noise complaints were referring to a different dog.
73	6	"O Grayson, Where Art Thou?"	March 28, 2017	2.01
Julie wants to have a couples retreat weekend with Lea at a resort in Atlanta. Although Todd finds Lea to be annoying, he reluctantly agrees to the idea since Lea's husband will be there to keep her occupied. Todd and Julie leave Grayson in Chase's care. Todd is upset to learn that Lea's husband was called out of town on business last night, leaving more time for her to spend with Todd and Julie at the resort. Meanwhile, Chase meets up with Ronndell, and he brings Grayson along, although Grayson would rather play with Chase. Instead, they go to a mall store so Chase can browse items for his new condo. While Chase and Ronndell look at candles, Grayson feels neglected and decides to leave the store. Chase later realizes that he has lost Grayson, who has contacted Julie to complain about Chase. Their parents subsequently leave the resort to pick up Grayson and head home early. Chase feels bad for neglecting his brother and ruining his parents' weekend, but he makes up for it a few days later by maxing out his credit card and taking the family to an Atlanta Hawks game at Philips Arena, where they have VIP tickets.
74	7	"Matchmakers and Batchbakers"	April 4, 2017	2.07
Savannah believes she is ready to get back into dating, and Todd and Julie have their own ideas about what kind of man is ideal for her. When Todd learns Savannah is going to a singles party to meet men, he decides to go there ahead of her so he has a chance to meet potential boyfriends for her, but she is upset to find him at the event. Later, Julie arranges for Savannah's ex-boyfriend Tyler to come to Nashville so the former couple can have lunch together, but Savannah finds the lunch to be awkward. Savannah convinces her parents that she can find a man on her own and that she has to be able to make her own choices in life. Meanwhile, Grayson enters a cookie baking contest. He gets help from Faye and Julie, but he removes them from the project because he feels they are too involved, as he wants to create the cookies largely on his own. He then has Todd supervise his baking, but the cookies do not turn out well. Grayson then has Julie and Faye help him again, and he later wins the first-place prize of $100.
75	8	"Dancing Tween"	April 11, 2017	1.95
Todd learns that Faye has been driving around on a suspended license, the result of not appearing in traffic court. As a prank, Todd arranges for a police officer to arrest Faye. Later, Savannah shows her new sports car to the family, and Todd decides to put her and Faye through a driving course, which they fail. They later take and pass a series of state driving tests. Meanwhile, Grayson is put through a children's etiquette school, which ends with a dance between the participants. Todd and Julie disagree over what Grayson should wear to the dance, and she is also reluctant to accept that Grayson is growing up. Grayson is nervous about the event, so Faye, Lindsie and Savannah take him to a dance class to prepare. Later, he successfully gets through the event and dances with Shelby.
76	9	"Moms Just Wanna Have Fun"	September 12, 2017	1.87
Todd and Julie agree to babysit Jackson while Lindsie and Savannah go out for a night of fun. Lindsie has an intricate ritual for getting Jackson to fall asleep, but Todd does not believe that such methods should be necessary. Under Todd's care, Jackson does not fall asleep until about 1:00 a.m. Todd wants the family to have a traditional Mother's Day, in which Julie prepares a dinner for Faye and the rest of the family. However, Julie is tired of the tradition and wants to be treated on Mother's Day too, although Todd does not believe that he has to celebrate Julie as she is not his mother. Julie, Faye and Lindsie decide to go to a spa for Mother's Day, leaving Todd to babysit Jackson again. When Jackson is too energetic for his nap, Todd decides to try Lindsie's methods. They try yoga, but it does not make Jackson tired. Todd tries another of Lindsie's methods, a massage using lotion and scented oil, which puts Jackson to sleep. Grayson and Savannah help Todd plan a Mother's Day dinner for the ladies, and he also serves as their waiter.
77	10	"Twisted Sisters"	September 19, 2017	1.53
Julie is ready to get back into real estate, as the Nashville market is booming, and Savannah wants to sell her house immediately, as she has realized she would rather live in a condo. The two decide that Julie will list Savannah's house as a great way to start her new real estate career, and Savannah agrees to dismiss her original real estate agent. However, Julie discovers that she needs to retake a real estate test to become licensed in Tennessee. She withholds this potential problem from Savannah and tries to study hard to pass the test, hoping to get licensed and sell the house before Savannah finds out there was ever an issue. Before she can dismiss him, Savannah's original agent finds a cash offer for her house that can be finalized in 15 days. Savannah decides to go with the offer, but she does not have the heart to tell Julie, who later finds out about the deal. Savannah apologizes, and Julie confesses that she is not yet licensed anyway. Meanwhile, Faye misses her sister Frances, so Todd brings her to Nashville to spend time together. Todd offers to drive the sisters around, but he becomes exhausted and annoyed by them, and soon regrets his decision.
78	11	"Prank Master"	September 26, 2017	1.71
Savannah is overwhelmed by recent events, including her car accident and the process of selling her house. As a result, she decides to take a semester off from college, a decision that upsets Todd and Julie. Savannah believes that she does not need a college degree to start off well in the music management industry. Hoping to prove Savannah wrong, Todd gets her a job working for his friends, Michael and Shane McAnally. Savannah is disappointed by the tasks that she has to do for the couple, as they have little to do with music. Todd makes her job more difficult by spending the day with Shane and demeaning her efforts. Savannah becomes convinced that she would have to start off doing menial tasks without a degree, so she decides she will return to college. Meanwhile, Faye wants revenge on Todd for his recent prank in which he had her arrested, so she plans a prank of her own with Julie and Grayson. She tells Todd that she lost $20,000 on casino betting and now needs his help paying it off. A debt collector finds Faye at the Chrisley house and threatens to take a vehicle unless she writes him a check. Todd and the debt collector argue, and Todd is prepared to fight the man until Faye reveals that the entire situation is a prank.
79	12	"Remission Control"	October 3, 2017	1.35
The Chrisleys decide to hold a family bowling competition, divided into four teams with two members each. Julie also has her annual breast exam coming up as she approaches the five-year anniversary of her breast cancer diagnosis. Todd and Julie are stressed out about the exam, but are happy when it reveals that she is still cancer-free and now in remission. Todd puts Faye and his children in charge of planning a party for Julie to celebrate her remission. Chase books the party to take place at the Cheekwood botanical garden, but later learns that rain is expected on the day of the party. Instead, the family celebrates at Julie's favorite restaurant. Later, Faye and Frances win the bowling competition.
80	13	"Differing Strokes"	October 10, 2017	1.58
Todd agrees to a foursome golf game with his friend Jay DeMarcus. Todd chooses Chase to be his golf partner, but he believes that Chase, who is a better golfer, is not taking their practice sessions seriously. Todd eventually chooses Grayson as his new partner, before begging Chase to come back to the team. On the day of the golf match, Todd and Chase eventually give up on trying to win and instead try to annoy their competitors. Meanwhile, it will be two weeks before Savannah's new condo is ready for move-in, so she goes to live with Nanny Faye temporarily. However, Faye's condo is cluttered with various boxes of her belongings, recently shipped from Atlanta. Faye and Savannah try to store the boxes in Todd's garage, but he objects. Later, the two women try selling Faye's belongings at a thrift market, but she will not part with any of the items for a reasonable price. Many of the items have sentimental value to Faye, as they bring back memories of her time with Gene. She eventually agrees to keep some stuff and sell the rest, making her condo clean again.
81	14	"Runaways and Segways"	October 17, 2017	1.50
Todd and Savannah are in charge of putting on a children's fashion show, as a charity event for the Boys & Girls Club. Todd and Savannah initially disagree on various aspects of the show and become competitive about it, but they eventually agree to come together. Meanwhile, Faye decides she would like to get a job giving Segway tours of Nashville, as a way to meet people. Faye gives an audition tour to her family, but she does so on a motorized cart because she does not feel safe on the Segway. Throughout the tour, Todd makes fun of Faye's efforts. Although she eventually gets the job, she turns it down because she may have to deal with people like Todd. Earlier, Todd had made a bet in which he agreed to shave his head if Faye got the job giving Segway tours. Although she received the job, Todd considers the bet null because she used a motorized cart instead of a Segway.
82	15	"Boys to Men"	October 24, 2017	1.64
Chase's 21st birthday is coming up, and he wants to go to Las Vegas to celebrate, but Todd is insistent on spending time with him instead as he transitions into manhood. Todd takes Chase to a barber to get shaved, and later takes him to be fitted for a suit, although Chase has no interest in such activities. Later, Nanny Faye helps Chase realize that Todd did not get to have such quality time with his own father, and Chase realizes that he will one day cherish these memories with Todd. Chase apologizes to his father, and Todd gets Chase a plane ticket to Las Vegas as a birthday gift. Meanwhile, Grayson wants to try out for football, and Julie and Savannah help him practice, although neither of them know what they are doing. Nevertheless, Grayson manages to get accepted onto the team.
83	16	"Animal House"	October 31, 2017	1.59
Julie, Savannah, and their friend Allison DeMarcus decide to have a staycation in Nashville. Todd agrees to watch Grayson and to let his friend Chris come over to spend the night while the women are away. When Allison's babysitter becomes sick, Todd volunteers to watch her two young children as well so the staycation can go on. However, Todd becomes annoyed with the rambunctious children. The next day, he has Faye come along to help him watch the children as he takes them to the Nashville Zoo. Meanwhile, during the staycation, Savannah is disappointed that Julie would rather go to bed early than have fun like Allison. Julie is upset that Savannah keeps comparing her to Allison, although Julie later agrees to accompany the women to the hotel bar the next night, and she ends up having fun.
84	17	"Tantrums and Tiaras"	November 2, 2017	1.24
Todd and Julie have taken over the Miss Florida USA pageant, and the family travels to Orlando so Todd and Julie can get settled into their new roles as the pageant directors. The Chrisleys stay at Universal Orlando Resort, and Grayson is excited for the family to spend time together at the resort's new Volcano Bay water park. However, Todd and Julie must first meet with pageant veteran Robin Ross-Fleming, who will help them transition into their new jobs. Robin suggests that Todd and Julie film an introduction video of themselves on the following day, but this coincides with the time that the family had planned to spend at the water park. The next day, Savannah accompanies Grayson around the park, while Chase and Faye drink alcohol in a nearby cabana. Meanwhile, Todd and Julie have creative disagreements regarding the introduction video. Todd wants an elaborate introduction that will include him wearing a crown and sash, while Julie wants to keep it simple. They bring in Savannah to get her opinion, leaving Chase to watch over Grayson at the park. Savannah agrees that the video should be kept simple, and they ultimately decide to feature the whole family in the video.
85	18	"Quit Your Pitchin'"	November 2, 2017	1.16
Todd volunteers himself and Savannah to play in a charity softball game, even though neither of them knows how to play. They practice to try to get better at the game, but Todd's criticism of Savannah fails to improve her skill. Meanwhile, Todd has agreed to get Grayson a puppy named Dixie, but he is too busy with softball to help Grayson train the dog, so he hires Chase to train it. When Chase is unable to teach Dixie, Todd has him help with softball practice instead. Chase helps Todd realize that his criticism of Savannah is not working in their favor. Although Todd and Savannah lose the softball game, they are happy that they played better than expected.
86	19	"Truckin' Good Time"	November 9, 2017	1.32
Julie agrees to make desserts for Cole and Jeremiah, the owners of a burger food truck that will serve the desserts during an upcoming event. Julie wants to make mini cakes that resemble burgers, so she goes to her friend Lorie, a professional cake decorator, for help. However, Julie realizes how difficult it can be to create specially designed cakes, and Todd helps her realize that she should keep her desserts simple, focusing on quality rather than appearance. Julie decides to make individual desserts in a jar, which are successful at the food truck event. Despite the success, Julie turns down an offer to make desserts for the food truck fulltime. Meanwhile, Todd wants Grayson to write an apology to Faye after having an attitude towards her. With help from Savannah, Grayson makes a collage of pictures showing Faye and him together, in addition to the apology paper, and she forgives him.
87	20	"Granny's Gone Wild"	November 16, 2017	1.12
Savannah is almost ready to move into her new condo and out of Faye's residence. When Faye loses her keys, Savannah becomes worried about her mental health and tells Todd, who starts to worry as well. Todd gets Faye a variety of senior products to help her, but they only make her feel old. Faye misses her social life in Atlanta, and she wants to move back there after dealing with Todd's overbearing behavior. To cheer her up, Faye is taken to meet a group of senior bikers, who take her for a ride in a sidecar. After having fun with her new friends, Faye agrees to stay in Nashville. Meanwhile, Grayson has been homeschooled since moving to Nashville, but he is now preparing to enter a private school as he starts fifth grade. He has to give a presentation about Tim Tebow, and Chase agrees to help him with it. Julie has little confidence that Chase is capable of helping Grayson, but he winds up impressing her.
88	21	"Baking Bad"	November 23, 2017	1.15
Savannah's old house has fallen out of escrow, so the family decides to let Faye move into it. Julie has hosted Thanksgiving for the last two years, and Faye wants to host it this year at her new house. However, Julie does not like Faye's controlling style in the kitchen. The women agree to settle the matter with a pie contest that will be judged by the other family members, with the winner getting to host Thanksgiving. While making their pies, Julie and Faye forgive each other and agree to work on Thanksgiving dinner together. Meanwhile, Todd has been unable to fall asleep lately as a result of his stress. At the advice of his doctor, Todd tries meditation, although he is unable to take it seriously. Desperate for a cure, Todd reluctantly tries acupuncture, despite his hatred of needles. To his surprise, the acupuncture gets rid of his insomnia.
89	22	"Pitch Perfection"	November 30, 2017	1.19
Todd invites Bill Rawlings and his family to Nashville to compete against the Chrisleys in a series of outdoor games, which are being held to celebrate Father's Day. Todd puts his family through an outdoor obstacle course to practice, as he intends to finally beat Bill and his family. However, Chase, Savannah and Grayson quit the team when Todd pushes them too hard, especially during the heat of the day. Todd apologizes to the children and manages to regroup the team. On the day of the event, the Chrisleys and the Rawlings win several games each, beating out other families that are also competing. The final game is a three-legged race, with Chase and Grayson against Bill's sons. The Chrisleys ultimately win the trophy, making Todd proud. Meanwhile, Grayson wants a $500 investment from Todd to start a YouTube channel in which Grayson plays video games and provides commentary. Grayson needs the money to buy a microphone, a camera, and editing equipment, but Todd wants him to first give a pitch presentation on why he should invest. Although Todd does not like or understand video games, he is impressed with Grayson's pitch and decides to invest in the idea.
90	23	"Bringing Up Baby"	December 5, 2017	1.43
Chase and Savannah do not believe that their parents' lives are that hard, so they agree to a bet with them, in which Chase and Savannah will fill in for the weekend, taking care of Grayson and errands. Todd also gives them a fake, crying baby to take care of, although Chase starts to enjoy caring for it and believes he may be ready for a real baby. Meanwhile, Todd and Julie use their free time go out on a date. Todd has arranged for them to learn tango dancing, although Julie is not particularly interested. Later, she tells Chase and Savannah that she would rather have a simple dinner at home, accompanied by a movie. They use this information to their advantage, upon learning that Todd is eager for his second date to go right. They reveal what Julie really wants, and in exchange, Todd agrees to declare them the winners of the bet, meaning he will have to pay their cell phone bills for two months.
91	24	"A Very Merry Chrisley"	December 7, 2017	1.31
Todd and Julie volunteer to direct a local nativity play, and they want it to be perfect. Chase, Savannah and Faye are put in charge of creating a stable and manger for the play, but Todd and Julie express dissatisfaction with their work. The trio later convince Todd and Julie that they should be more appreciative of their efforts. Although the play is not perfect, Todd and Julie are satisfied enough with how it turned out. Meanwhile, Todd and Julie are concerned about Grayson and Chloe's Christmas lists, which are longer now than ever before. Realizing how spoiled the children are, Todd and Julie have them pick out some of their toys to donate to less fortunate children. Faye and Frances unexpectedly come to stay a few days and spend Christmas with the family. Chase also comes home from Atlanta for the holiday, and he has brought Parker and Ronndell with him. Todd is upset with the number of people staying with him, as he was hoping for a quiet holiday, but Chloe convinces him that he needs to be less grumpy since it is Christmas time. To make up for his behavior, Todd gets everyone Christmas-themed onesie costumes. Meanwhile, Faye and Frances decide to bet money on a broomball game that will include Chase and Savannah, who are competing against Parker and Ronndell. Frances bets on Chase and Savannah, who ultimately win the game.
92	25	"Ready to Launch"	December 12, 2017	1.56
The Chrisleys travel to Florida as Savannah prepares to launch her clothing line on the Home Shopping Network. Todd accompanies Savannah to her rehearsal at the studio, and he is surprised to see how nervous she is. Savannah later reveals her concern that the clothing line will not sell well, but her parents convince her that there is nothing to worry about. The next day, Savannah successfully launches the clothing line on-air and it sells out. Meanwhile, Chase watches over Nanny Faye to keep her out of trouble, and Todd gives Chase his credit card to pay for their lunch. However, Nanny talks Chase into going to a casino with her to gamble. When Chase loses his money, he gets more from Todd's credit card, and he ultimately loses $500 to Nanny in a card game. When Todd finds out, he wants Chase to work for him for a day to pay off his debt. Nanny eventually feels guilty for getting Chase into such a situation, so she takes Chase's place.

=== Season 6 (2018) ===
No. overall	No. in season	Title	Original release date	U.S. viewers (millions)
93	1	"Training Faye"	May 8, 2018	1.42
Todd is concerned when he learns that Faye is on the verge of having high blood pressure. Savannah hires her fitness trainer, Kevin, to help Faye with her physique, and Faye finds him to be handsome. However, Todd dislikes the idea of his mother working out with a young man and decides to fire him. Todd becomes her new fitness trainer, but he pushes Faye too hard, to the point of exhaustion. Realizing that Faye enjoyed working with Kevin, Todd decides to bring him back as her trainer. Meanwhile, Chloe's fifth birthday is coming up. Todd and Savannah compete against Chase and Grayson to see which team can impress Chloe more at the party. However, Julie is upset that they have turned the party into a competition. Todd and Savannah dress as clowns and put on a show at the party, while Chase and Grayson perform a magic act. While performing for Chloe, Todd realizes that Julie was right, in that what really matters is making Chloe happy. Chloe has fun at her party, and she enjoys the clown show more than the magic act.
94	2	"Todd and Pony Show"	May 15, 2018	1.28
Savannah used to enjoy riding horses as a child, and she is eager to get Chloe interested in the activity as well. However, Savannah wants everything to go perfectly. She has Chloe wear a horseback riding outfit and repeatedly coaches Chloe on how to ride, but Chloe soon loses interest as a result. Savannah is eventually convinced that she was too overbearing, like Todd, and she accepts that she has to let Chloe have her own fun with horse riding, as she is only five years old. Meanwhile, Julie is overwhelmed after running errands for Faye on a regular basis, and Todd believes that Faye is capable of completing the errands on her own. Todd takes over and becomes Faye's assistant, but he intends to be disruptive in order to teach Faye that she should handle the errands herself. Faye ultimately fires Todd and apologizes to Julie, while agreeing to do her own errands.
95	3	"A Date with Destiny"	May 22, 2018	1.61
When Chase breaks up with his girlfriend, Todd and Julie secretly decide to find him a perfect woman. They eventually choose Victoria, the daughter of Todd's friend. Upon hearing of this plan, Savannah and Faye believe that they could choose a better woman for Chase. Todd and Julie arrange to have a restaurant lunch with Chase, without telling him that Victoria will be there, in order to surprise him. Todd and Julie are surprised as well when Savannah and Faye show up with Sonnie, another date for Chase. Sonnie had previously attended Lipscomb University with Savannah. Chase meets Victoria and Sonnie, but he subsequently leaves the restaurant early, out of embarrassment that his family is arranging dates for him. Later, he tells them that he had already begun dating a new woman named Destiny. Chase brings Destiny to the Chrisley house, and the family learns that she is a stripper. Chase later reveals that he was pranking them for revenge, and that Destiny is actually an actress he hired. Meanwhile, Grayson must practice a trumpet for a week as part of a school project. However, his poor playing quickly aggravates Todd, who tries and fails to build a soundproof booth for Grayson. Todd is relieved when he learns about noise-cancelling headphones.
96	4	"Biddy Battle"	May 29, 2018	1.46
Faye is lonely, and Frances misses her, so the two decide to become roommates at Faye's house in Nashville. Todd believes it is a bad idea, and the women prove his point as they get on each other's nerves. Faye is upset by how messy Frances is, and Frances does not like Faye's controlling behavior. While having dinner at Faye's house, Todd provokes an argument between the two women for his amusement. However, it backfires on him when Frances leaves Faye and temporarily moves in with him, until she can get back to Atlanta. Todd and Julie eventually get the sisters to reconcile, and Frances decides she will return to her own home. Meanwhile, Grayson wants to get into the Guinness Book of World Records, so he decides to try putting on 53 socks in one minute. Savannah arranges for a Guinness official to witness Grayson's attempt, but he only manages to get 11 socks on in the allotted time. Although he is sad, Savannah and Chase get him a certificate of completion to celebrate his attempt.
97	5	"Painted Into a Corner"	June 5, 2018	1.48
Todd is doing a full renovation on a new house in Nashville that the family will eventually move into, and he wants an oil portrait of the family to hang up in the new home. However, the other family members believe it is a bad idea because they will have to stand still for hours while the portrait is painted. Todd proceeds with the idea anyway, even though the family will have to go through five sessions with the painter, with each session lasting about two hours. Todd is disappointed when their first session ends shortly after it begins, as the other family members cannot stay still for long. Todd compromises with the family and agrees to have a regular photograph taken of them instead. Meanwhile, Todd has hidden a pie for himself in the oven, and it burns when Julie preheats the oven for a meal, unaware that the pie is in there. The incident causes concern in Grayson, who has a tendency to worry. He orders supplies to use in the event of a fire, and he has the family go through a fire drill, but he is disappointed with their performance. To make Grayson feel better, the family takes him to a local fire station to talk with a firefighter, who gives them safety tips.
98	6	"Hearts and Crafts"	June 12, 2018	1.67
Todd is planning an elaborate Valentine's Day gift for Julie, until he learns that she would rather have a simple, homemade gift. He is unsure of what to make for Julie, so Savannah and Grayson help make gifts for her, using supplies from Craftsy. Julie enjoys her gifts, which consist of homemade chocolates and a framed photo of her and Todd when they were younger. Meanwhile, Faye and Frances are planning to attend a senior dance, but Chase inadvertently reveals this to Todd, who insists on chaperoning Faye despite her opposition. Faye is upset with Chase for getting Todd involved, so Chase makes a plan in hopes of reconciling with her. Todd agrees to let Chase and Ronndell chaperone Faye and Frances instead, although in reality, the two men plan to let the ladies do what they want at the dance. Faye agrees to this idea and forgives Chase, and she and Frances have fun at the dance.
99	7	"Top Dog"	June 19, 2018	1.66
Julie is helping to arrange an art fair for Chloe's school class, and she has Todd help out as well. However, he disagrees with the idea of handing out participation certificates to the entire class, believing that an award should only be given to a child with the best artwork. He also believes that five-year-olds are impressionable and that participation certificates will fail to motivate them into being their best later on in life. Julie eventually convinces Todd that the art fair is not a competition, and he agrees to keep his opinions to himself on the night of the event. Meanwhile, Faye has entered her dog Miley in a dog pageant, and she has Savannah help her because of her own past experience with pageants. It becomes a family competition when Grayson and Chase enter Dixie in the pageant as well. The brothers claim victory when Dixie wins second place, whereas Miley fails to place in the top three.
100	8	"Celebrating a Chrisley Century"	June 19, 2018	1.45
The Chrisleys celebrate their 100th episode by looking back at memorable scenes from the show. The family reminisces about pranks they have pulled on each other, and their efforts to keep up their appearances. They also recall their competitive behavior, and the numerous jobs that Chase and Savannah have had over the years. The episode also looks back at the various antics that Faye has gotten herself into, including those that involve gambling and alcohol. In addition, Todd provides his advice for raising children, which includes monitoring them closely and teaching them financial responsibility. The family also looks back at difficult situations they have had to go through on the show, including the stressful aftermath of Julie's battle with breast cancer, and Savannah's latest car accident.
101	9	"Panic at the Pageant"	June 26, 2018	1.35
The Chrisleys travel to Tampa to prepare their first Miss Florida USA pageant. While there, Faye wins money at a casino and decides to buy a $4,600 ring, which leaves Todd worried that she made a poor purchase and got scammed. Todd leaves Julie and Savannah to prepare a portion of the pageant without him, while he hires an appraiser to determine the value of the ring. Faye is upset at Todd for trying to prove her wrong, but the appraiser determines that the ring is only worth $2,500. Meanwhile, Julie and Savannah are upset after being left to do much of the pageant work on their own, although they manage to get the event ready in time.
102	10	"No Men for Old Country"	July 3, 2018	1.34
The Chrisleys join the DeMarcus family at an outdoors resort. Todd and Jay feel that their manliness is being called into question when they are mocked by the women over their inability to start a fire, something that the women end up achieving with ease. To convince the women of their manliness, Todd and Jay prepare a large barbecue dinner with various meats. Meanwhile, Chase is upset when Chloe keeps running a remote-controlled car into him, and she cries when he takes the controller away from her. Chase believes that Chloe is spoiled, but other family members insist that she is just a child. Todd urges Chase to reconcile with Chloe, so Chase plans a princess carriage ride and picnic to make it up to her.
103	11	"Baking Up Is Hard to Do"	July 10, 2018	1.53
Cole and Jeremiah are opening a restaurant, and Julie agrees to make desserts for their grand opening, although she must do so at home due to limited space in the restaurant's kitchen. At home, Todd, Chase and Grayson try to help Julie prepare the desserts, but they only set her back. Later, Todd rents Julie a large kitchen space for easier preparation. Meanwhile, Chase upsets Savannah when he shows her a picture of her ex-boyfriend with another woman. To make it up to Savannah, Chase pays for her to have dinner with her friend, a woman named Collins. They enjoy their meal until a poem and cake is sent to Savannah's table from a secret admirer. Savannah finds the idea of an admirer weird, and she later learns that Chase and Grayson came up with the idea to further cheer her up. Savannah is still upset with Chase, so he agrees to accompany her and Collins to a mood-painting class.
104	12	"Running Gout of Time"	July 17, 2018	1.54
Todd has developed gout as a result of an unhealthy diet, and he is upset by the lack of sympathy from his family, although they remind him that he has previously been unsympathetic to them at times. Todd is unwilling to start drinking water to get rid of the gout, as he dislikes the taste, so he opts for IV fluids instead, despite his hatred of needles. Julie, Faye and Chase feel bad for Todd, so they make him a fat-free cherry pie to help with his gout. Meanwhile, Julie and her friend Allison plan to participate in a 5K run, and Chase decides to train them. However, he has a crush on Allison and is too distracted to help Julie. After a talk with Todd, Chase agrees to focus on training both Allison and Julie, and he also participates in the run with them.
105	13	"Ride or Die"	July 24, 2018	1.12
Todd and Julie's friend, Bill, is moving to Nashville. Julie is overwhelmed by all of her errands, so Todd eventually hires Bill as her assistant. Meanwhile, Chloe gets her first bicycle and it makes Faye want to learn how to ride one, so Chase decides to help her. However, Todd does not want her to ride a bike because of her advanced age. Faye is hardly able to get herself onto the bicycle, and she decides to give up after failing to get the hang of riding it. Later, Chase gets her a different bike that is easier to get onto, and she manages to learn how to ride it.
106	14	"Going for Broker"	July 31, 2018	1.15
Julie agrees to take Grayson and his friend Chris to a reptile convention. Todd teams up with Jay to purchase some land so they can build six houses and four townhouses. Julie, Chase and Savannah each want to be the listing agent for the new homes, so Todd has them compete against each other for the job. While the trio are busy taking a written test that Todd has prepared for them, Todd must reluctantly take Grayson and Chris to the reptile convention, despite his dislike of reptiles such as snakes. Faye and Chloe accompany them to the convention. Meanwhile, Julie does not like that Todd has her competing against her own children for the job, and it is later decided that the three of them will work together to sell the homes.
107	15	"America's Next Todd Model"	August 7, 2018	1.11
Todd buys Faye a golf cart that she can ride around her neighborhood, like other residents do in the area. Faye is upset with local children who she has observed vandalizing property and smoking. When one child accidentally hits her golf cart with a ball, she goes to a community meeting and convinces the residents to make her the captain of a neighborhood watch. Faye and her sister Frances dress up as security guards and ride around on the golf cart to patrol the neighborhood, but Faye loses her position after she pats down children, thinking that they might have had cigarettes. Faye receives a new position as a community crossing guard. Meanwhile, Todd receives an offer for an upcoming model casting. Todd was previously a runway model for Rich's in 1986, and he wants to get back into modelling, so he hires a model coach to help him prepare for the casting call. When Todd arrives at the modelling agency, he realizes they were seeking out older men such as himself, which makes him upset about his age. Although Todd wants to forget about the modelling shoot, Julie and Savannah convince him to go forward with it.
108	16	"Say It, Don't Spray It"	August 14, 2018	1.17
Todd and Julie learn from Savannah that Chase has gotten back together with his ex-girlfriend, whom they dislike, and Todd is upset that Chase did not tell them. Chase gets a guitar lesson from Jay and also confides his family drama to Jay. Todd is further upset when he learns that Chase feels more comfortable discussing such issues with Jay, who later gets the two to talk about their issues and reconcile. Meanwhile, Nanny Faye agrees to be a test subject for Savannah to try out a home spray tan kit. However, Savannah's effort makes Nanny darker than intended. Savannah has a friend show her how to properly use the spray tan nozzle, and she has better luck when she later gives Julie a tan.
109	17	"Emotionally In-Vested"	August 21, 2018	1.06
Julie decides to get rid of old dress clothes because she no longer feels comfortable wearing such outfits, but Todd devises an idea that they should get dressed up and go out to an upscale restaurant for a date. Julie agrees, but is upset when Todd questions her outfit choice. Later, Julie mentions to Todd that she likes the dress a woman is wearing at the restaurant, but she is upset when Todd says the dress would look good on her too. Julie is unhappy with her heavy weight, the reason she no longer likes getting dressed up. Todd makes matters worse when he tells Julie that he likes her weight, although he is unsure what he did to offend her. Meanwhile, Faye and Frances are going on a gambling trip, but Faye is hesitant to leave behind her dog Miley, who suffers separation anxiety. The hotel does not accept dogs, and Todd will not allow Miley to stay at his house. In addition, Chase's plan to have Miley designated as an emotional support animal fails. Chase later arranges a deal with Todd to keep Miley at Todd's house, where Chase will stay to care for the dog while Faye is away. In exchange, Faye reveals to Todd why Julie is upset with him, and he reconciles with her.
110	18	"White Nannies Can't Jump"	August 28, 2018	0.99
While dining with Jay and Allison, Todd learns that they listen to podcasts and then decides that he and Julie should make a podcast of their own called Chrisley Confessions. Todd hires a vocal coach to help Julie be her best for the podcast, but she becomes annoyed with the process and with Todd's desire for perfection. Later, they agree to keep their podcast simple and authentic. They record their first episode in Jay's home recording studio. Meanwhile, Faye joins a senior women basketball league, and the family helps her prepare for a game. Although Faye's team loses, she still has fun playing.
111	19	"Restaurant Impossible"	November 28, 2018	1.09
Julie pursues a long-time dream of hers to open a restaurant. With an empty building already selected, Julie and Savannah go there to meet with Julie's designer to discuss the future restaurant's appearance. However, Todd wants to help and has canceled the appointment, instead arranging for two of his own chosen designers to meet with Julie and Savannah. Julie turns the designers away and later expresses her frustration with Todd for interfering in her project. To make it up to Julie, Todd arranges for a special dinner to be held in the restaurant for the family. Meanwhile, with Ronndell's help, Chase decides to start his own candle company. The two take a class to learn how to make candles, and they later have Julie, Savannah and Faye help them to make 50 candles for a pop-up store, where they will test the viability of the products. Chase keeps the business venture a secret from Todd until the product launch, to prove that he can do it on his own without financial help from his father. The candles prove to be a profitable idea, and Todd is proud of Chase for his success.
112	20	"Spoiled Sports"	November 28, 2018	0.95
Chloe has an upcoming horse riding competition, but it is scheduled for the same weekend as Grayson's 12th birthday. Grayson is upset that his birthday celebration at Universal Orlando Resort is being delayed a week, so Chase and Ronndell decide to take him there in time for his birthday. Although Todd agrees with the idea, Julie insists that he accompany them to Orlando, after Chase previously lost Grayson while watching him one time. At the theme park, Todd has no desire to get on any rides. Later, they trick Todd into going on the Jurassic Park River Adventure, telling him that it is a peaceful and scenic ride. Todd is soaked on the ride and decides to end the day, despite that Grayson has only gone on two rides. The next day, Chase helps Todd realize that Grayson is not having fun, so Todd remedies the problem by getting the group VIP passes for the rides and by having their hotel room decorated for Grayson's birthday. Meanwhile, Chloe is exhibiting competitive behavior about her upcoming horse contest. While Todd embraces the family's competitive behavior, Julie thinks Chloe is too young to behave in such a way, so she teaches Chloe that it is okay to lose.
113	21	"The Perfect Equation"	December 4, 2018	1.09
Savannah's out-of-town boyfriend Nic comes to Nashville, so Todd decides that he and Chase will spend a day with Nic to get to know him better. Todd takes Nic shopping for clothes, then abandons Nic in the store to see if he will pay the bill himself, as a test to determine whether Nic is a freeloader. Nic pays for the clothes, and Todd begins to approve of him as Savannah's boyfriend. Meanwhile, Grayson is having difficulty studying for an upcoming math test, and Todd's temperamental behavior fails to motivate him. Savannah and Chase try to help Grayson and they eventually succeed by asking him math questions that relate to his love of sports.
114	22	"Lord of the Earrings"	December 4, 2018	0.96
Julie has a tendency to lose her jewelry, so Todd devises a sign-in/sign-out chart that she must participate in every time she takes or returns her own jewelry, an idea that she dislikes. Later, Julie finds a pair of her earrings in Todd's pants before she starts a load of laundry. Upset that Todd himself had misplaced her jewelry, Julie decides to prank Todd by requesting the earrings from him, to make him feel guilty once he realizes that he has lost them. Meanwhile, Faye decides to compete in her neighborhood's porch decorating competition. Chase helps her, although her plan to offer moonshine on her porch is foiled once Todd finds out. Faye then decides that she and Chase will play music on her porch, although Chase has limited experience playing the guitar. On the day of the competition, Chase recruits Jay to perform on Faye's porch, helping her win the competition and a trophy. Meanwhile, Grayson admits Julie's scheme to Todd. Later, Todd gets revenge by having Julie come home from the porch competition to help him with a kitchen flood, only for her to discover that there is no flood.
115	23	"Diplomatic Immunity"	December 11, 2018	1.09
Chloe's preschool graduation ceremony is coming up, but it is scheduled for the same time as the Miss USA and Miss Teen USA pageants in Louisiana. Although Julie wants to attend Chloe's graduation, it is decided that Julie needs to handle the pageants with help from Savannah, who is filling in for Todd. Savannah is eager to do well, hoping that Todd will appoint her as the program director for the upcoming Miss California USA, but Todd believes she only wants the job so she can be near her boyfriend Nic in California. Meanwhile, Todd takes over Julie's role on the graduation planning committee and will also attend the ceremony. Todd wants a grand ceremony with pony rides, but the committee disapproves of his ideas. Todd still intends to give a speech to the children, but Chase and Faye are unsupportive, believing that a speech is not necessary. Eventually, Todd scraps the speech and simply hands out graduation diplomas to the children. Savannah manages to get everything ready for the pageants, allowing Julie to return to Nashville early and surprise Chloe at her graduation. Todd is impressed with Savannah's work and decides to give her the job in California.
116	24	"Towing the Line"	December 11, 2018	0.99
Chase and Savannah stay home to take care of Grayson and Chloe, while their parents have a staycation at a local hotel for Father's Day. Grayson is jealous of all the time that Savannah has been spending with Nic lately, so she agrees to start spending time with Grayson again. Although Todd had warned Chase not to drive his Range Rover, Chase and Ronndell take the vehicle anyway to go get food, but they return afterwards to find that the vehicle is gone. Thinking it was towed, Chase and Ronndell take a taxi to various tow yards around Nashville. They eventually find the Range Rover at one of the tow yards, where Todd is waiting to confront unsuspecting Chase. Todd had found the vehicle using a tracking device, and he is satisfied to see the look of shock on Chase's face, considering it a great Father's Day gift.
117	25	"Pool's Out for Summer"	December 18, 2018	1.29
Chase wants to sell his Atlanta condo and travel for a year to experience various candle scents around the world, describing it as research for his candle company. However, Todd does not trust Chase and thinks he is aimless. Todd suggests that Chase instead move into their house in Nashville, which will soon be vacant once the family moves to a new home, at which point Todd will give the old house to Chase. However, Todd had already promised the house to Savannah, a fact he withholds from Chase. Todd simply instructs Chase not to tell Savannah because she will be jealous. Later, Chase and Savannah realize that Todd had promised them both the house. Following Nanny Faye's advice to get revenge, Chase decides to become an unbearable housemate to make Todd regret letting him live there. Chase and Todd eventually discuss their schemes, and Todd is happy to learn that Chase wants to pay for his own house in Nashville, if he decides to move there. Meanwhile, Faye enjoys going over to Allison's house to look at her children's handsome swim instructor, DeMarco. When Todd finds out, he forces DeMarco to quit.
118	26	"The Big 50"	December 18, 2018	1.09
Todd is surprised and upset that he is nearly 50 years old, feeling regret for not doing certain things with his life. In particular, he regrets not always being around to spend time with his children, as he was busy working. To make it up to them, he and Chase go racing on an indoor go-kart track, and he later goes horseback riding with Savannah. At Todd's request, Julie arranges a large birthday party for him which includes dozens of guests. Meanwhile, Grayson believes he is now old enough to be left home alone, rather than having to accompany his mother on errands. Todd devises a way to secretly test whether Grayson can be trusted home alone, and he is impressed with Grayson's response.

=== Season 7 (2019) ===
No. overall	No. in season	Title	Original release date	U.S. viewers (millions)
119	1	"Man-O-Pause"	May 28, 2019	1.34
Todd is devastated when he is diagnosed with low testosterone. He begins taking steroids to remedy the problem, but it makes his temper worse than usual when he takes more tablets than directed. Todd eventually gets a second medical opinion and learns that his testosterone levels are normal. Meanwhile, Grayson has accidentally dropped and damaged another cell phone of his, so Todd makes him do chores to earn money for a new phone. With help from Nanny Faye, Grayson begins a car-washing service for the neighborhood and earns hundreds of dollars, covering half the cost of a new phone. Todd is impressed with Grayson's effort and decides to cover the remaining cost for the phone.
120	2	"Rugrats"	May 28, 2019	1.09
Todd reluctantly agrees to let Chloe have her first slumber party, even though he does not want noisy children in the house. It is also Savannah's first slumber party, as Todd never let her have one when she was younger. Todd is irritated by the hyperactive children until Savannah gives them a calming facial treatment. Meanwhile, Faye is terrified when she finds a mouse in her house. Frances brings in a group of cats, but none of them catch the mouse. Grayson builds a trap which captures the mouse alive, allowing it to be released into the wild.
121	3	"Faye Talk Pretty One Day"	June 4, 2019	1.34
Faye is happy to be chosen as the presenter for Grayson's basketball awards ceremony, and she decides to work on her pronunciation issues so she can give a speech. Chase takes her to a professional who tries to help her pronounce words correctly, although she still has difficulty. At the event, Faye is able to speak clearly once she scraps the speech in favor of saying what is on her mind. Meanwhile, Chloe is having her first father-daughter dance at school, but Todd goes overboard trying to make sure the dance is perfect. He and Chloe take dancing lessons, and he also insists that their outfits match. Todd eventually apologizes to Chloe when he realizes he has taken things too far, and he and Chloe enjoy the dance.
122	4	"Different Strokes"	June 11, 2019	1.34
Todd believes that Grayson is keeping a secret from him, which is uncharacteristic of Grayson. Todd takes Grayson shopping for clothes in hopes of bonding with him and eventually learning the secret, but his plan fails. Faye convinces Todd that Grayson will eventually come to him when he is ready. Later, Grayson reveals that he has a girlfriend named Skylar, and Todd happily accompanies the two on a date to get ice cream, to the embarrassment of Grayson. Meanwhile, Faye wants to learn how to swim now that the family is getting a pool at their house, although Chase proves to be an unhelpful swim instructor. Later, Chase hires a muscular instructor who gets Faye's attention and is able to teach her.
123	5	"Todd Man Out"	June 18, 2019	1.21
Todd is jealous when the family begins spending time with Savannah's hairstylist friend Chadd. Eventually, Todd decides to get a haircut by Chadd, and the two men bond. Meanwhile, Todd gets Chloe a pet fish, which she has named Bones. When Bones dies as a result of Todd overfeeding him, he is reluctant to tell Chloe about the death. While Todd wants to buy a new fish and secretly replace Bones, Julie convinces him that Chloe needs to learn about death. Later, Todd holds a funeral for Bones to help Chloe feel better.
124	6	"Down On The Farm"	June 25, 2019	1.28
Chase and Grayson make a bet with Nanny Faye to prove that they can handle tough chores just like she could when she was growing up. However, they find the work too hard and now owe her $200 each. To avoid paying Nanny, they make a new bet with her. Nanny frequently talks about how difficult it was growing up on a farm, so Chase and Grayson challenge her to prove that she knows how to do farm work. They travel to a farm, where Nanny successfully completes several chores with ease. Chase and Grayson now owe her $400 each. Meanwhile, Todd, Julie and Savannah travel to California, where Savannah is serving as event director for her first Miss California USA pageant. Todd openly disagrees with her handling of the event, and later explains to Julie that he feels like his children no longer need him. He later apologizes to Savannah and praises her work.
125	7	"Wire, Wire, Pants on Fire"	July 2, 2019	1.29
Grayson is about to get braces on his teeth, but Todd and Julie learn from the dentist that he has a small mouth and will also need to be fitted with a palate expander. Because Grayson has a tendency to worry, Todd and Julie decide not to tell him about the expander, which he only learns about on the day of the procedure. Later, Savannah tells Grayson that their parents had already known about the expander, despite their earlier denials at the dental office. Grayson is upset that his parents lied to him, until they explain why they did it. Meanwhile, Chase wants to join Nanny Faye's country club, but she is reluctant to help him gain membership because it would be a big expense for him. Nanny calls off a meeting that Chase was to have with the country club members, but she later agrees to help him get in once she realizes how much it means to him.
126	8	"Faye's Got Talent"	July 9, 2019	1.11
Savannah is still in a long-distance relationship with Nic. She has a FaceTime chat with him but he is partially distracted, speaking to his French mother. Afterwards, Savannah decides to learn French, but she has difficulty with it. Meanwhile, Faye wants to participate in a senior talent show, and Chase helps her to figure out her talent. She tries being a hibachi chef and a magician, but her efforts fail, and Todd upsets her when he suggests she is not talented. They later reconcile, and Faye decides to perform a comedy act with a puppet named Little Todd, ultimately winning third place.
127	9	"Good Faye Hunting"	July 16, 2019	1.21
Faye wants to hunt a turkey to cook for Thanksgiving, even though she has never used a gun before. Todd is opposed to the idea, but Faye proceeds anyway. Chase, his friend Elliott, and Frances accompany Faye to a gun club to practice their shooting. On the day of the hunt, Chase is reluctant to kill a turkey, and the group soon learns that Todd replaced their bullets with blanks. Meanwhile, Grayson decides to join his school's debate team, although he has difficulty perfecting his performance for the tryout. Julie helps him, and he eventually is accepted onto the team.
128	10	"What Not To Swear"	July 23, 2019	1.15
When Todd finds out that Faye is playing in basketball games again, he insists on being involved. Initially, he comes to watch Faye during practice, but his criticism of her teammates proves to be unhelpful. During a game, Todd finds out that Chase is a commentator and then tries to steal his role to criticize the players. Todd's feelings are hurt when Chase and Faye turn him away. They feel bad for him, so Chase gets him the role of head cheerleader, a position that he winds up enjoying. Meanwhile, when Chloe uses a cuss word, it prompts Julie to crack down on Todd and Chase's use of profanity in front of the children. The family tries using a cuss jar to remedy the issue, but it does not curb the profanity. Julie starts donating Todd's clothing every time he cusses, but he dismisses this approach, upset with the amount of clothing he has lost. Eventually, Todd and Julie explain to Chloe that cussing is inappropriate.
129	11	"Young St. Nic"	July 30, 2019	0.94
Nic is in Canada but is planning to be with Savannah and the Chrisley family for Christmas Eve. Ahead of time, he asks Todd and Julie for their permission to marry Savannah, and they happily agree. Nic intends to propose to Savannah on Christmas Eve, and the family must keep it a secret from Savannah until then. Todd wants the proposal to be a grand event, but Julie insists that the setting be simple. Meanwhile, Chase borrows Julie's vehicle several times without asking. Later, Julie and Faye become stranded when the vehicle runs out of gas, as Chase did not fill up the tank. On Christmas Eve, Nic proposes to Savannah and she happily accepts.
130	12	"Kick the Bucket"	October 3, 2019	0.72
Faye's 75th birthday is coming up, and she has a bucket list of things that she wants to do now while she has the chance. First, Faye invites the family to ride a mechanical bull, and Todd rides it for her because she is unable to do so. Later, Faye takes Julie to a private club in Nashville to show her appreciation. Eventually, Faye takes Todd and Chase to an indoor rock-climbing center, but Todd leaves because he dislikes the entire idea of a bucket list, as he cannot handle the idea of Faye not being around one day. Faye talks to Todd and helps cheer him up. Meanwhile, Todd wants a good photo of Chloe after being disappointed by her school photo. He rents a photo studio and camera equipment to give Chloe her own photo shoot, but the photos turn out blurry because he did not focus the camera. Todd reluctantly recruits Chase to take better pictures, conceding that his own were poor.
131	13	"Pipe Dreams"	October 3, 2019	0.74
Faye's house is flooded because of a leak, and Todd insists that she live with him while her house undergoes repairs. She reluctantly agrees, but they both soon regret it as they get on each other's nerves. Todd is upset when Faye insists on exercising while he is having a work-related phone call. Todd is later upset when he finds that Miley has urinated on the floor. Faye happily moves back into her home after the repair work is finished. Meanwhile, Savannah is donating her old dresses to a charity, and Julie makes Chase help Savannah with an upcoming event to give the dresses away. However, Chase becomes distracted by women who are also helping to plan the event. He later feels bad for not being helpful to Savannah, so he puts more effort into his next attempt.
132	14	"You Can't Handle the Tooth!"	October 10, 2019	0.83
Julie is upset when Todd, posing as the tooth fairy, gives Chloe $120 when she loses a tooth. Julie thinks it is too much money for a six-year-old, and she ultimately convinces Todd to place the money into a savings account. Todd is also convinced that he needs to reach a balance between being a strict parent and a fun grandparent. Meanwhile, Julie cannot find a sentimental cookbook of hers, and she suspects Faye took it, as she is known to take things. Faye denies taking the cookbook, and Todd questions whether Julie misplaced it, as she has a tendency to lose things. Todd reluctantly is forced to choose between the two women, so he creates a mock courtroom setting in the house and holds a trial to determine what happened to the cookbook. Judge Todd is unable to reach a conclusion, but the cookbook is later found at Faye's house, and she apologizes to Julie, not realizing that she had the book.
133	15	"Tattoo You"	October 10, 2019	0.84
Julie decides to compete in an upcoming chili cook-off, and she becomes obsessed with trying to make a winning recipe. Todd likes her original chili recipe and thinks she should use it for the cook-off, and she eventually agrees with him after several disappointing experiments. Julie is happy when her chili wins second place in the competition. Meanwhile, Faye is upset when Todd places a spending limit on her credit card, out of concern that she is spending too much money. Tired of Todd interfering in her life, Faye decides to get a tattoo to anger him, as he does not approve of tattoos. Her tattoo is on her chest and depicts a heart with Gene's name on it. Todd dislikes the fact that she would get a tattoo, and Faye later reveals to him that it is only temporary and washes off with water.
134	16	"Are You There Todd? It's Me Grayson"	October 17, 2019	0.82
Because of erratic weather recently in the area, Faye is concerned that the apocalypse may be near. After touring Jay's fully stocked bunker, Faye decides to prepare herself for the apocalypse with help from Chase. She buys a pickup truck and various weapons, but Chase tells Todd about her preparations after becoming concerned that Faye is taking the situation too seriously. Todd decides to let Faye continue on her quest, realizing that he has to know which battles to fight with his mother and that this one is not worth it. Meanwhile, Julie is reluctant to accept that Grayson is growing up and going through puberty, and Todd decides to help him transition into manhood. Todd teaches Grayson how to shave, and later gives him driving lessons on a golf cart, although Todd is upset when Grayson does not take the driving seriously.
135	17	"Driving Ms. Faye"	October 17, 2019	0.90
Faye accidentally runs her car into some trash bins, leaving scratch marks on the vehicle. She and Chase take the car to a repair shop to remove the scratches before Todd finds out, but they fail. Faye has an upcoming driving test, and the family helps her prepare for it. Later, Todd tries to convince Faye that she should start riding a senior transport bus instead of driving, but she believes that she might as well be dead if she loses the ability to drive herself around. Faye ultimately passes her test, and does not have to take it again for another 10 years. Meanwhile, Todd wants Chloe to be accepted into a STEM school so she can go on to be successful later in life, but she has no interest in science or math, and Julie believes that the choice should be up to Chloe. Julie is upset to find out that Todd tried to bribe school officials into accepting Chloe by giving them tickets to see Faith Hill. Ultimately, Chloe is not accepted due to the school having too many students already.
136	18	"Chickening Out"	October 24, 2019	0.92
Julie is tired of dealing with Todd's claustrophobia, which includes a fear of being in tunnels, car washes, and elevators. He refuses to get professional help, but reluctantly agrees to let Chase and Savannah try their methods. They take him through a car wash and then force him into the car trunk afterwards to try helping him get over his fear, but they fail to cure him. A hypnotist is subsequently hired to cure Todd, but Todd is unable to take the process seriously. Meanwhile, Faye has purchased two chickens to keep in her backyard so she can have fresh eggs, but Todd warns her that her neighbors and the homeowner association will not allow the noisy chickens in the community. The stress of keeping the chickens a secret ends up being too much for Faye to handle, and she agrees with Todd's idea to give them to a woman who already owns other chickens.
137	19	"Bummer Camp"	October 24, 2019	0.92
Todd has a broken fibula after slipping and is now in a wheelchair. Julie is planning to take Chloe on a camping trip, but impressionable Chloe loses interest after she hears Todd criticizing the idea of camping. Todd reluctantly agrees to go on the trip so Chloe will go, and he has a better experience than he expected. Meanwhile, Chase helps Faye win a dog charity contest by selling boxes of chocolate. As the winner, Faye gets to have Miley's picture featured in the charity's pamphlet and on keychains.
138	20	"Mid Summer Night's Faye"	October 31, 2019	0.69
Faye is excited to be creating costumes for a play, A Midsummer Night's Dream, but Todd believes she is too talented to not be more involved. When one of the actresses breaks her hip, Faye is chosen as the replacement to play a fairy. Although she is happy to have only two lines of dialogue, Todd arranges for her role to be expanded. Todd helps Faye practice for the role, but she has difficulty remembering her lines and becomes frustrated with him. Later, Todd is surprised when Faye learns all her lines after performing a few acting exercises with Chase. She goes on to perform well in the play. Meanwhile, Nic is planning a surprise birthday party for Savannah, but he is aware of how nosy she is, so he recruits Chase's help to distract her. They send each other text messages about a fake party that is being planned at a rooftop bar, knowing that Savannah will read through Nic's cell phone and find the messages. Later, Todd and Savannah visit the bar to ensure it is a nice location, but they are confused when they learn that no reservation has been made for the party. Eventually, Nic surprises Savannah with her real birthday gift: a hot air balloon ride.
139	21	"Retail Therapy"	October 31, 2019	0.75
Todd has to go to a doctor appointment to get physical therapy for his recovering leg injury, although he is not looking forward to it. Instead, Faye takes Todd shopping to cheer him up and to spend time with him, something she has not done in a while. Julie is upset when she learns that Todd skipped the doctor appointment, although she forgives Faye. Meanwhile, Savannah misses playing football like she did in her youth, until Todd started enrolling her in beauty pageants, which she also enjoyed. Todd, who is not interested in sports, is initially unsupportive of Savannah's decision to join a local football team, until he learns how important it is to her.
140	22	"Something Old Something Nude"	November 7, 2019	0.92
Faye's childhood friend Susie comes to visit her, and Faye suffers a bad hangover the next day following a party at her house. Later, Susie takes Faye to a nudist campground. When Todd does not hear back from Faye, he and Chase track her phone's location. They are surprised when they learn where she is, and Todd forces her to go back home. Meanwhile, Nic is upset to be left out of his wedding plans, which are being arranged by Savannah and Todd. They want a large and elaborate wedding despite Nic's opposition, and Chase convinces Nic that he has to be more assertive if he wants to be a part of the planning. Todd, who thinks of the wedding as his own creation, angrily ends his involvement in the planning after Nic voices his frustration. The three later agree to compromise on the wedding details.
141	23	"Vote for Chrisley"	November 7, 2019	0.89
When Tennessee considers legalizing gambling, Faye decides to run for state office to get the idea passed, as she is tired of having to go to Tunica, Mississippi for casinos. Chase becomes her campaign manager, but the two realize how unprepared they are when they do a radio interview, during which Faye decides to run as a single-issue candidate solely focused on the legalization of gambling. Later, Faye gives a speech to a small group of supporters, and Todd believes she cannot win the election. Todd offers to help Faye with a petition to legalize gambling if she will drop out of the race, which she agrees to do. Faye is happy when online gambling is legalized, considering it a step in the right direction. Meanwhile, Chloe now has an imaginary friend named Breakfast, who is a six-foot-tall cat with purple fur. Todd thinks it is nonsense to have an imaginary friend, and he worries that Chloe will become known as an odd child at school. Faye convinces him that it is normal for children to have imaginary friends and to accept it, saying she will outgrow it eventually. Todd has a tea party with Chloe and Breakfast, and later learns that Breakfast has moved into his own home.
142	24	"Fish Guts and Glory"	November 14, 2019	0.83
Grayson wants to go fishing, so Nanny Faye takes him, and she has Chase come along. After an unsuccessful day of fishing, Nanny admits that she does not know how to fish and only said she did because she thought it would be a good opportunity to spend time with her grandsons. Meanwhile, Nic has received his real estate license, and Todd and Julie give him a chance to list an investment property of theirs, which would be a prime opportunity for him to boost his new career. However, Nic declines the offer as he wants to prove he can be successful on his own, and Todd accepts his decision. Savannah believes Nic has passed up a great opportunity, so she tries to help his career in a different way. She has a billboard advertisement put up, but Nic finds it vague as it is merely a picture of his face with the caption, "Who is Nic Kerdiles?" Savannah says the ad will make people wonder who he is and that they will learn about his business when they look him up, but Nic dislikes the ad because it lacks basic information. Later, Todd convinces Nic to accept the listing for his property.
143	25	"Beanbags & Bullies"	November 14, 2019	0.88
Faye wants to enter a senior cornhole competition, but she needs a partner who is at least 50 years old. Frances turns out to be a poor player, and Chase is ineligible to compete because of his age. Todd, who is a skilled player, agrees to enter the contest with Faye, and they ultimately come in second place. Meanwhile, Chloe wants to remove the curls from her hair after classmates tell her that only straight hair is beautiful. Todd and Savannah teach Chloe to fight back against bullies with harsh words, but she gets in trouble at school for defending herself. Julie fears that Chloe herself could become a bully, so she and Todd advise Chloe to take a more subdued approach when dealing with bullies.
144	26	"Three Men and a Chloe"	November 21, 2019	0.92
Todd feels he should get to know future son-in-law Nic better, so they take a weekend vacation to a resort with Julie, Savannah and Faye. Todd insists that he and Nic share a hotel room together. The next day, Todd takes Nic to have a spa treatment, but Nic does not find it appealing, so Todd agrees to let Nic plan the activity for the following day. Nic decides to have the group go on a whitewater rafting ride on the Ocoee River, but Todd refuses to let Faye go on the ride, believing it is too dangerous. Todd himself is apprehensive about getting on the ride, although he winds up enjoying it. Meanwhile, Chase stays at home to take care of Grayson and Chloe, with help from Ronndell. Chase is eager to prove to Julie that he can handle the responsibility, although Ronndell feeds the children pizza and ice cream, and Chase has difficulty getting them to bed on time. Later, Chase, Grayson and Ronndell help Chloe prepare for a school gymnastic recital, and Julie is impressed with Chase's babysitting.

=== Specials (2019–20) ===
Title	Original release date	U.S. viewers (millions)
"Thanksgiving Special"	November 21, 2019	N/A
"Christmas Special"	December 24, 2020	N/A
"Holiday Celebration"	December 24, 2020	0.47

=== Season 8 (2020–21) ===
No. overall	No. in season	Title	Original release date	U.S. viewers (millions)
145	1	"Grandma Theft Auto"	July 9, 2020	0.96
Todd is upset when he learns that Savannah has gotten a new haircut, chopping most of her hair off. He is further upset when she says she cannot make it to help pick out bridesmaid dresses for her wedding. Savannah confides to Chase that she and Nic have actually decided to call off their wedding. After dealing with a long-distance relationship, the couple recently moved in together and realized that they have compatibility issues. Savannah eventually tells her parents, and the news devastates Todd, who has been eagerly planning the wedding. Savannah believes that she and Nic rushed to marriage too soon, and Todd eventually accepts their decision to call the wedding off, after Julie reminds him of his failed first marriage. Meanwhile, Faye is jealous that everyone else in the family has a new luxury vehicle. She wants one as well, but Todd is unwilling to pay for one and believes that her current vehicle is fine. To make Faye appreciate what she has, Todd gets her an old vehicle and takes away her current car. Faye dislikes the old vehicle, so she leaves it at Todd's house and steals his vehicle. She later comes to appreciate her previous car, and Todd agrees to return it to her.
146	2	"Badminton to the Bone"	July 16, 2020	0.73
Grayson wants to go to a party, but Todd and Julie refuse to let him as there will be no chaperones. Todd and Julie consider Grayson to be their good child and they are strict with him because they do not want him to become a troublemaker like Chase. Grayson considers sneaking out to the party, but Chase advises him not to do so. Grayson still proceeds with sneaking out, but he later decides that he does not want to be at the party, and Chase agrees to pick him up. Todd and Julie discover that Grayson sneaked out, and they are proud of Chase for becoming a good role model after learning that he warned Grayson not to go. Meanwhile, Julie and Faye have been spending a lot of time lately playing badminton, but they do not want Todd there to watch them play, thinking he will mock them. Todd and Savannah sneak in during their badminton practice, and Todd becomes jealous of Julie's male instructor. Todd begins working out and pampering Julie to impress her, and Savannah later tells her why he is behaving this way, prompting Julie to put Todd's mind at ease.
147	3	"Roller Skates and Senior Dates"	July 23, 2020	0.76
148	4	"Bother-in-law"	July 30, 2020	0.94
149	5	"Wrong Side of 40"	August 6, 2020	0.83
150	6	"Lice, Lice Baby"	August 13, 2020	0.82
151	7	"Hot Meals and Dirty Deals"	August 13, 2020	0.92
152	8	"Everlasting Todd"	August 20, 2020	1.04
153	9	"Let's Talk About Sex, Grayson"	August 27, 2020	0.76
154	10	"Snitchy Bitchy"	September 3, 2020	0.93
155	11	"Faye's Pig Adventure"	November 12, 2020	0.91
156	12	"We Be Jammin'"	November 19, 2020	0.79
157	13	"Mrs. Doubt Hire"	November 26, 2020	0.54
158	14	"Build A Baby"	December 3, 2020	0.87
159	15	"Chrisley Knows Pest"	December 10, 2020	0.81
160	16	"Odd Savannah Out"	December 17, 2020	0.93
161	17	"Grays of Thunder"	January 21, 2021	0.97
162	18	"Selling Todd"	January 28, 2021	0.85
163	19	"The Young and the Restless"	February 4, 2021	0.92
164	20	"Hit the Road, Todd"	February 11, 2021	0.83
165	21	"Hurricane Todd"	February 18, 2021	0.80
166	22	"Let's Bee-have"	February 25, 2021	0.78
167	23	"Hex Goddess"	March 4, 2021	0.87
168	24	"A Dame to Remember"	March 11, 2021	0.78
169	25	"Captain Chrisley"	March 18, 2021	0.85
170	26	"Puppy Love"	March 25, 2021	0.94

=== Season 9 (2021–22) ===
No. overall	No. in season	Title	Original release date	U.S. viewers (millions)
171	1	"The Botox Monster"	August 12, 2021	0.80
172	2	"Snore Wars"	August 19, 2021	0.84
173	3	"The Grudge Match"	August 26, 2021	0.99
174	4	"Quitters Never Win"	September 2, 2021	0.81
175	5	"Home Sweet Chrome"	September 9, 2021	0.88
176	6	"Madam Faye"	September 16, 2021	0.82
177	7	"Blind-Sighted"	September 23, 2021	0.75
178	8	"Players and Party Planners"	September 30, 2021	0.68
179	9	"Egged On"	October 7, 2021	0.82
180	10	"A Brand New Todd"	October 14, 2021	0.79
181	11	"Age Against the Machine"	October 21, 2021	0.75
182	12	"Best in Shoe"	October 28, 2021	0.74
183	13	"Monkey Wrench"	November 4, 2021	0.77
184	14	"The Fast and the Spurious"	November 11, 2021	0.69
185	15	"It's Your Lucky Faye"	November 18, 2021	0.60
186	16	"See Ya Later, Alligator"	November 25, 2021	0.68
187	17	"Welcome to the Dog House"	December 2, 2021	0.65
188	18	"Catcher if You Can"	December 9, 2021	0.64
189	19	"A Very Chrisley Fixmas"	December 16, 2021	0.75
190	20	"No Basic B*tch"	June 23, 2022	0.51
Note: This episode aired 16 days after Todd and Julie Chrisley were convicted of bank and wire fraud.
191	21	"Switchin It Up"	June 30, 2022	0.53
192	22	"Eye on the Prize"	July 7, 2022	0.59
193	23	"Playing Favorites"	July 14, 2022	0.56
194	24	"Love Thy Neighbor"	July 28, 2022	0.47
195	25	"Cut Throat Chrisleys"	August 4, 2022	0.51
196	26	"Prank You Very Much"	August 11, 2022	0.55

=== Season 10 (2023) ===
No. overall	No. in season	Title	Original release date	U.S. viewers (millions)
197	1	"Renovation Frustration Part 1"	February 6, 2023	0.60
198	2	"Renovation Frustration Part 2"	February 13, 2023	0.62
199	3	"Social Disorder"	February 20, 2023	0.60
200	4	"Mind Your Business"	February 27, 2023	0.57
201	5	"Trolled You So"	March 6, 2023	0.57
202	6	"Attitude Intervention"	March 13, 2023	0.53
203	7	"Faycation (All I Ever Wanted)"	March 20, 2023	0.62
204	8	"Snowbody Loves Me"	March 27, 2023	0.54
