= Todd Chrisley =

American media personality (born 1969)

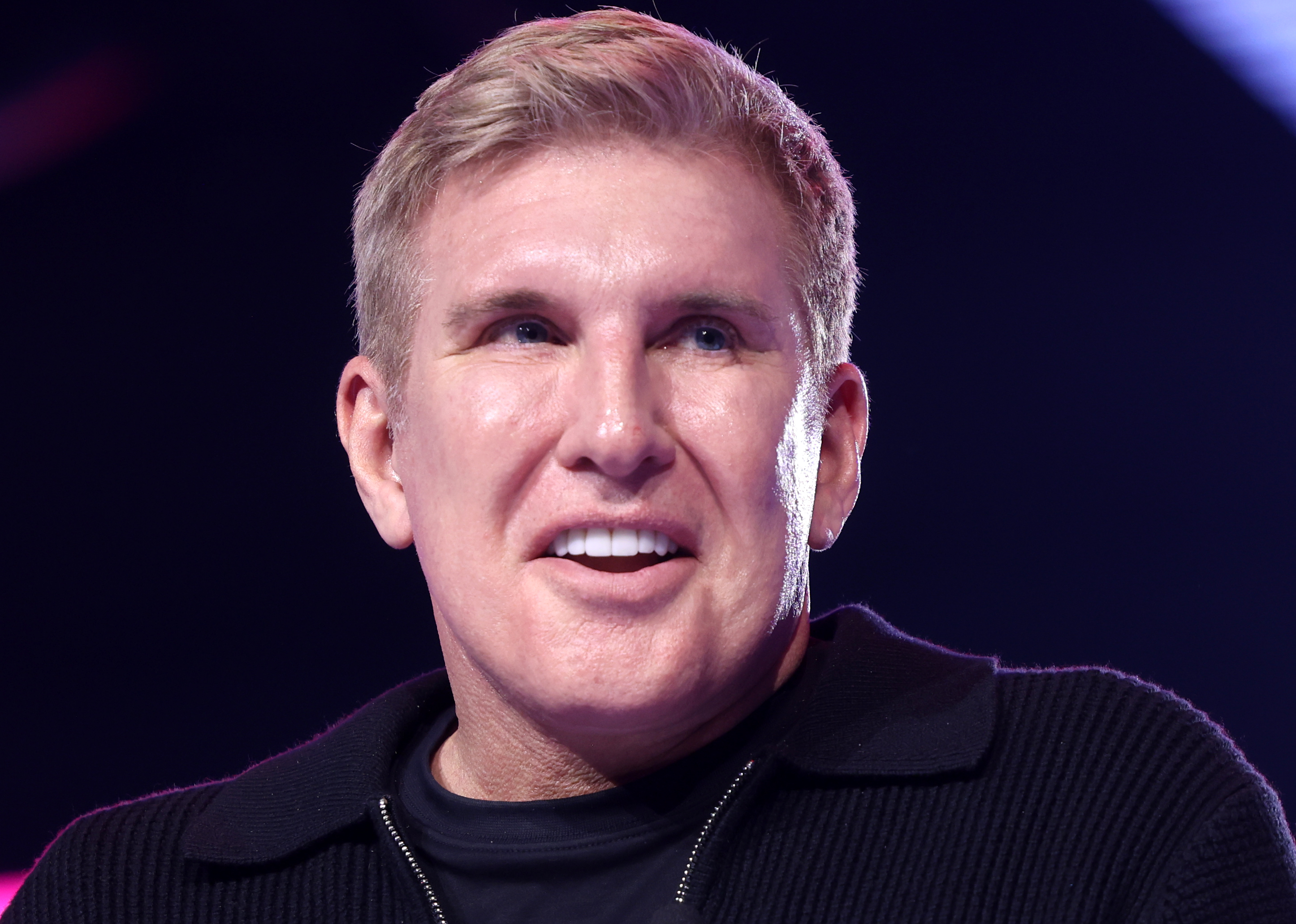
- Chrisley in 2025
- Born: Michael Todd Chrisley; 1968/1969 (age 57–58); Georgia, U.S.
- Occupation: Television presenter
- Years active: 2014–2023; 2025–present
- Known for: Chrisley Knows Best Chrisley Confessions
- Criminal charges: Tax evasion, conspiracy to commit bank fraud
- Criminal penalty: 12 years in federal prison, later vacated by presidential pardon (Note: President Donald Trump announced the pardons on May 28, 2025.)
- Criminal status: Pardoned May 27, 2025 (Note: President Donald Trump announced the pardons on May 27, 2025.)
- Spouses: Teresa Terry (m. 1990; div. 1996); Julie Hughes Chrisley (m. 1996)
- Children: 6, including Savannah Chrisley

Michael Todd Chrisley (born April 6, 1968 or 1969) is an American media personality and real‑estate entrepreneur. He is known as the patriarch of Chrisley Knows Best, a USA Network series that aired from 2014 to 2023 and chronicled his family’s lives in Georgia and Tennessee. Chrisley’s flamboyant taste, sharp one‑liners, and famously strict helicopter parenting style became signature elements of the show.

In August 2019, Chrisley and his wife Julie were indicted on 12 counts, including conspiracy to commit bank fraud, wire fraud, and tax evasion. They were convicted of all charges in June 2022. In November 2022, Todd Chrisley was sentenced to 12 years in prison. Both Chrisleys were later pardoned by President Donald Trump in May 2025.

== Early life ==
Michael Todd Chrisley was born in Georgia and is the eldest of three sons of Elizabeth "Faye" Chrisley (née Hughes) and Gene Raymond Chrisley, a U.S. Army veteran who fought in the Korean War and died in 2012.

He and his brothers, Randy and Derrick, were raised in Westminster, South Carolina. Derrick died from complications in infancy in 1971. Chrisley has said his mother often worked up to sixty hours a week in a local textile mill to support the family, a work ethic he credits with shaping his outlook. Although born Michael Todd, he has gone by his middle name, “Todd,” since childhood.

== Career ==
Chrisley began as a real estate investor, managing properties and overseeing developments that brought him financial success during the early part of his career.

In 2014, Chrisley Knows Best premiered on the USA Network. The show focused on Chrisley’s opulent lifestyle, his family, and his outspoken personality. The program was a ratings success, leading to multiple spin-offs, including Growing Up Chrisley, which featured his children Chase and Savannah.

Despite its popularity, the show ended in 2023 following legal issues faced by the Chrisley family.

In 2016, Chrisley released a single with country music singer Sara Evans titled "Infinite Love", which peaked at number 39 on Billboard Hot Country Songs.

== Fraud and tax evasion ==
Todd and Julie Chrisley were indicted by a federal grand jury in August 2019 on 12 counts, including conspiracy to commit bank fraud, wire fraud and tax evasion—after prosecutors alleged the couple submitted falsified financial statements to secure more than US$30 million in loans. Following a three‑week jury trial in Atlanta, both were found guilty on every count on June 7, 2022.

U.S. District Judge Eleanor Ross sentenced Todd to 12 years' imprisonment and Julie to seven years on November 21, 2022, and ordered them to pay US$17.8 million in restitution. The couple began their sentences on January 17, 2023.

=== Appeal and resentencing (2024) ===
The United States Court of Appeals for the Eleventh Circuit upheld the Chrisleys’ convictions on June 21, 2024, but ruled that the district court had mis‑calculated Julie Chrisley’s sentencing guidelines, vacated her sentence, and remanded the case for a limited resentencing.

At a hearing on September 25, 2024, the district court again imposed a seven‑year term and re‑affirmed the restitution order.

=== Presidential pardons (2025) ===
On May 27, 2025, President Donald Trump telephoned the Chrisleys' adult children during a publicly released Oval Office call and said he intended to grant full presidential pardons "by tomorrow". The White House confirmed the next day that Trump had signed the warrants, and the Bureau of Prisons released both Todd and Julie Chrisley hours later. Pardon Czar Alice Marie Johnson claimed the Chrisley family was unjustly targeted by a "weaponized justice system." Legal analysts countered that the Chrisleys’ unanimous jury convictions were affirmed on appeal by the Eleventh Circuit in 2024, and prosecutors described the case as being supported by "years‑long bank‑fraud and tax‑evasion schemes" documented through extensive records.

== Post-prison work ==
Following their pardons in May 2025, Todd and Julie began filming their the Lifetime reality series The Chrisleys: Back to Reality. The series premiered in September 2025 and documented the family's experiences surrounding Todd and Julie's incarceration, pardons, and return home. Todd and Julie competed in season 14 of The Masked Singer as "Croissants". They were eliminated in the season 14 premiere alongside David Ortiz as "Googly Eyes", but were not fully unmasked until the beginning of the next episode.

== Personal life ==
Todd Chrisley married Julie Hughes in 1996. The couple had three children together: Chase (born June 1996), Savannah (born August 1997), and Grayson (born May 2006). Todd also has two children from a previous marriage, Lindsie (born September 1989) and Kyle (born August 1991). Todd and Julie later adopted Kyle's daughter, Chloe, who was born in November 2012.

The family frequently appeared on Chrisley Knows Best.

In December 2025, Todd's son and Julie's stepson Kyle was arrested in Rutherford County, Tennessee, on numerous charges, including domestic assault, assaulting an officer, resisting arrest, disorderly conduct and public intoxication charges. The arrest came during the time Todd and Julie Chrisley were suing the Rutherford County Sheriff's office for a similar arrest against Kyle in September 2024.

== Shows ==
- Chrisley Knows Best (2014–2023)
- Growing Up Chrisley (2019–2023)
- The Chrisleys: Back to Reality (2025-)

== See also ==
- List of people granted executive clemency in the second Trump presidency
