= Chrisley Knows Best =

2014 American reality television series

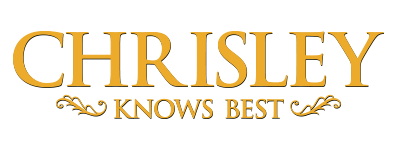
- Genre: Reality
- Starring: Todd Chrisley; Julie Chrisley; Kyle Chrisley; Lindsie Chrisley Campbell; Chase Chrisley; Savannah Chrisley; Grayson Chrisley; Chloe Chrisley; Faye Chrisley
- Country of origin: United States
- Original language: English
- No. of seasons: 10
- No. of episodes: 204 (list of episodes)

Production
- Executive producers: Adam Greener; Jim Sayer; Stephanie Bloch Chambers; Todd Chrisley
- Producer: Annie Kate Pons
- Camera setup: Multiple
- Running time: 22 minutes
- Production companies: Maverick Television; All3Media America

Original release
- Network: USA Network
- Release: March 11, 2014 – March 27, 2023

Related
- According to Chrisley (TV series); What's Cooking with Julie Chrisley; Growing Up Chrisley; Chrisley Confessions; Love Limo; The Chrisleys: Back to Reality

Chrisley Knows Best is an American reality television series that aired on the USA Network from March 11, 2014, to March 27, 2023. It revolves around the lives of real estate tycoon Todd Chrisley and his wealthy family. The show was filmed in Roswell and Alpharetta, suburbs of Atlanta, before moving primarily to Nashville during the fourth season. Growing Up Chrisley, a spin-off focusing on Chase and Savannah Chrisley, premiered in 2019.

In June 2022, Todd Chrisley and his wife Julie Chrisley were found guilty on federal charges of bank fraud, tax evasion, and submitting false documents to banks to take out loans and fund their lavish lifestyle. In November 2022, the couple was sentenced. Todd Chrisley reported for his 12-year sentence on January 17, 2023, to Federal Prison Camp, Pensacola. Julie Chrisley, who was sentenced to seven years, reported to Federal Medical Center, Lexington. In September 2024, Julie Chrisley's seven-year sentence was upheld, following an appeal, which was determined in United States District Court for the Northern District of Georgia in Atlanta. Before the ruling was announced, Julie expressed her regret for her actions.

On May 27, 2025, President Donald Trump announced he was pardoning Todd and Julie Chrisley. In December 2025, Todd and Julie's son Kyle would be arrested on numerous criminal charges, including domestic assault and public intoxication.

== Cast ==
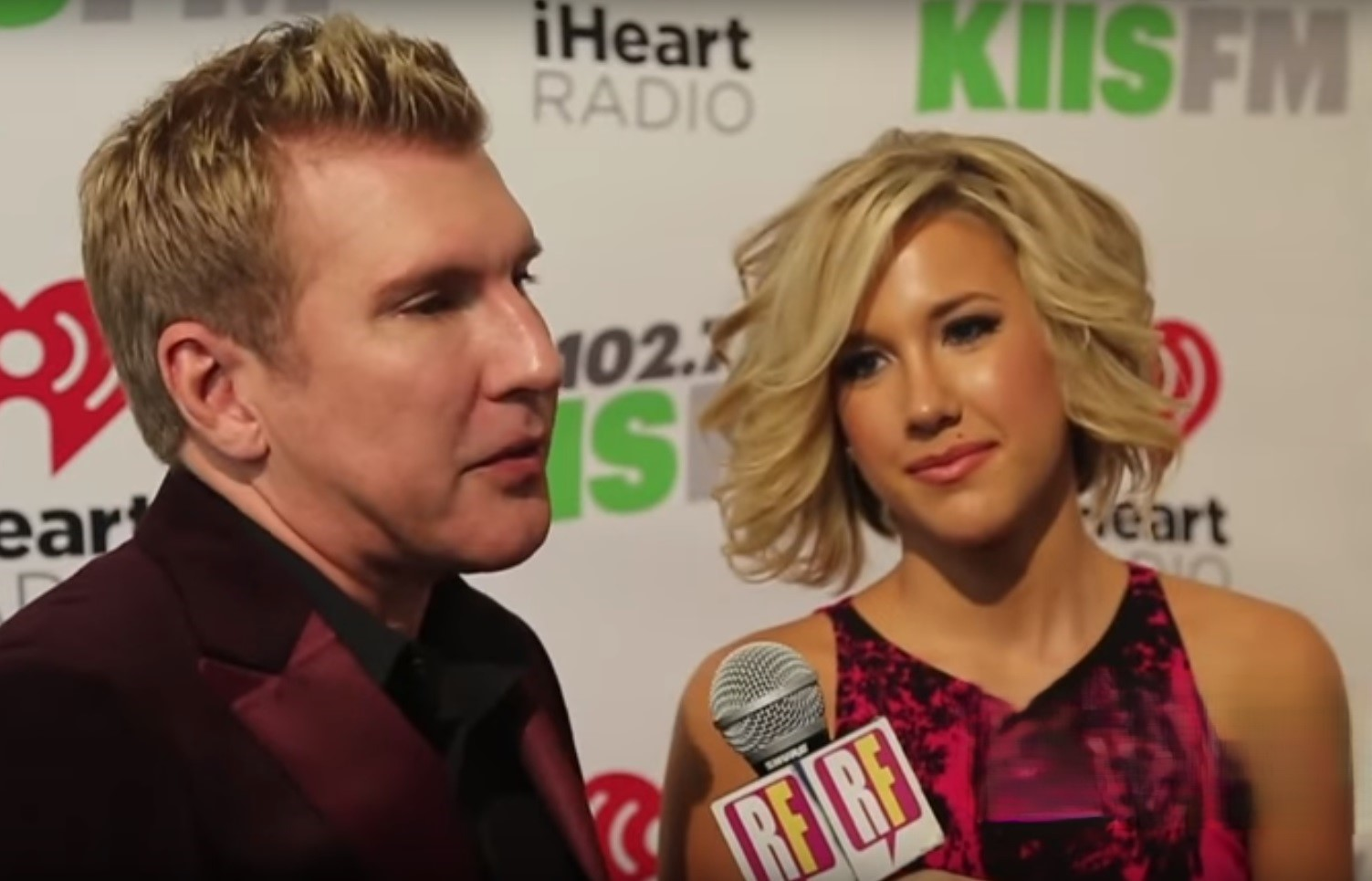
Todd and Savannah Chrisley interviewed by RumorFix at KIIS-FM's Jingle Ball 2014

- Michael Todd Chrisley, who goes by the name Todd, is a real-estate tycoon. Todd was born in Georgia and raised in Westminster, South Carolina. He was previously married to his high school girlfriend, Teresa Terry, before marrying Julie in 1996. He has two children with Teresa and three children with Julie. Todd said he has embraced longtime, false rumors that he is gay: "I'm flattered that people think I can get laid on both ends. So, that doesn't bother me and my wife certainly is flattered that as many men want her husband as there are women." Todd was found guilty in June 2022 of federal bank fraud and tax evasion charges that involved taking out fraudulent loans funding an extravagant way of living.
- Julie Chrisley, Todd's wife. She is also from South Carolina and is the daughter of a Baptist minister. She has three children with Todd: Chase, Savannah, and Grayson. She also has a web series, What's Cooking with Julie Chrisley, which was launched on USA Network's website. Julie was found guilty of federal bank fraud and tax evasion charges in June 2022 and was involved in defrauding banks to take out loans to fund a lavish lifestyle.
- Lindsie Chrisley Campbell is Todd's daughter with ex-wife Teresa Terry. Lindsie eloped with Will Campbell in 2012, without getting her father's approval, although he eventually forgave Will. Lindsie and Will briefly separated in 2014, before reconciling. They grew apart and filed for divorce in 2016. They later reconciled again and withdrew the divorce filing. However, the couple would in later time again file for divorce, which was finalized in October 2021. They have a son. Lindsie made her final appearance in season 5. She and other members of the Chrisley family have made various allegations against one another since then. According to her attorney "Lindsie has been a constant target of lies, harassment and threats from her family and as a result, has been distancing herself from the Chrisley family since 2017." In May 2026, she was arrested in Georgia on suspicion of driving under the influence, the attempt to elude police, reckless driving, improper passing, and speeding.
- Kyle Chrisley is Todd's son with ex-wife Teresa Terry. He is the father of Chloe and is a recovering addict with bipolar disorder. He appeared in the first season before getting involved in drugs again, and had been mentioned only once since then, in the second season. He announced in 2019 that he is sober again, and made an appearance in the season 8 finale in 2021.
- Chase Chrisley is Todd and Julie's older son.
- Savannah Chrisley is Todd and Julie's daughter. She is a former beauty pageant competitor and won the Miss Tennessee Teen USA title in 2016 and placed in the Top 15 at Miss Teen USA 2016. She founded a cosmetic company. In 2024, Savannah competed in the eleventh season of The Masked Singer as "Afghan Hound." She was eliminated on "The Wizard of Oz Night". On February 17, 2026, she was welcomed as a co-host on The View.
- Grayson Chrisley is Todd and Julie's younger son.
- Chloe Chrisley is Kyle's young daughter who is being raised by her grandparents Todd and Julie due to Kyle's problems with substance abuse.
- "Nanny" Faye Chrisley is Todd's mother. She is from Westminster, South Carolina.

== Production ==
The series was pitched to ten networks, nine of them made offers to buy it. USA Network picked up the series in December 2013. The series was executive produced by Adam Greener, Jim Sayer, and Stephanie Chambers. Maverick TV and All3Media America were the production companies behind the series. The series producers had access to the Chrisleys' schedule and decided which events to film. The family stated that being on television made them think twice before doing things, both on and off-camera. Julie said, "People are watching, people are looking at you. Whether that be good or bad, they're gonna catch it all."

On April 14, 2014, the USA Network ordered a 12-episode second season of Chrisley Knows Best. At the time the series garnered more young viewers than any other original program on USA Network, with a median age of 36.5 years among viewers. The series aired its 100th episode in June 2018. Hank Stepleton served as executive producer and showrunner for 86 episodes of the series.

On August 13, 2019, during the seventh season of the show, Todd and Julie were indicted by the Georgia Department of Revenue on multiple tax evasion and bank fraud charges. They turned themselves in on August 14 and were later released on a $100,000 bond. Despite the charges, the series was renewed for an eighth season. The couple settled the case with the Georgia Department of Revenue but still faced multiple federal charges including tax evasion. The federal trial began on May 17, 2022, and ended on June 7; they were convicted on each of the charges against them. On November 21, 2022, Todd and Julie Chrisley were sentenced to 12 and 7 years in prison respectively. Both the series and the Growing Up Chrisley spin-off were canceled, although a handful of episodes from the previously-renewed tenth season of Chrisley Knows Best, filmed prior to the trial, aired on USA Network in 2023.

== Episodes ==
Season	Episodes	Originally released	
Season	Episodes	First released	Last released
1	8	March 11, 2014	April 22, 2014
2	13	October 14, 2014	December 17, 2014
3	20	June 2, 2015	December 23, 2015
4	26	March 8, 2016	November 1, 2016
5	25	February 21, 2017	December 19, 2017
6	26	May 8, 2018	December 18, 2018
7	26	May 28, 2019	November 21, 2019
Specials		November 21, 2019	December 24, 2020
8	26	July 9, 2020	March 25, 2021
9	26	August 12, 2021	August 11, 2022
10	8	February 6, 2023	March 27, 2023

== Broadcast and streaming ==
Chrisley Knows Best is broadcast on USA Network in the United States. In the UK, it airs on ITVBe. Chrisley Knows Best reruns can be seen on E!, USA Network, Bravo, and video on demand.

In Australia, New Zealand, Canada, and Ireland the first two seasons can be streamed on Netflix. In the United States, all seasons of Chrisley Knows Best can be streamed on the Hulu + Live TV, Bravo, USA, E!, Syfy, Telemundo, Oxygen, NBC apps. As of August 25, 2023, only seasons 1–9 are available on the Peacock app.

== Reception ==
Chrisley Knows Best received "mixed or average" reviews according to Metacritic, based on five reviews from the first two seasons. Tom Gliatto and Liza Hamm of People gave a positive review, saying "This is the best 'family' reality series since Here Comes Honey Boo Boo or even The Osbournes from several centuries ago." Hillary Busis of Entertainment Weekly gave a mixed review, saying "If you can get past the canned lines and sub-sitcom storylines, the Chrisley crew can be fun".

Brian Lowry of Variety gave the show a mixed review, stating that it is "intended to elicit sniggering" regarding Todd Chrisley's "'flamboyant'" personality. In his review of the show's second season, Lowry described it as "a throwback that recycles old sitcom plots, under the guise of an unscripted series".

From 2015 to 2017, the series won the NATPE's Reality Breakthrough award for best docusoap. In 2016, it was nominated at the 22nd Critics' Choice Awards for "Best Unstructured Reality Series", but lost to Anthony Bourdain: Parts Unknown.

In July 2022, Matt Roush, a television critic for TV Insider, publicly expressed his disgust over the show's return the previous month in light of Todd and Julie's recent criminal convictions.

== Related projects ==
Todd was busy in 2015 developing a talk-show with USA Network; he mentioned early plans for a spin-off that would focus on Chase and Savannah.

=== According to Chrisley ===
In August 2017, it was announced that USA Network had ordered a half-hour after show titled According to Chrisley. According to Chrisley is hosted by Todd and features him "tackling the truth about marriage, parenting, sex and relationships." Each episode also features a member of the Chrisley family and a celebrity guest. The show premiered on September 12, 2017. It was canceled after one season due to poor ratings.

=== What's Cooking with Julie Chrisley ===
On October 3, 2017, USA Network's website launched What's Cooking with Julie Chrisley, a 10-episode web series with Julie sharing her favorite recipes.

=== Growing Up Chrisley ===
In January 2019, it was announced that Chase and Savannah would star in their own spin-off titled Growing Up Chrisley. The show follows the two as they "embark on a road trip from Nashville to Los Angeles to prove their independence". It premiered on April 2, 2019, on the USA Network. The second season of the show premiered on August 6, 2019. The third season premiered on August 12, 2021. The series was canceled alongside Chrisley Knows Best in November 2022. The cancellation happened a month after Growing Up Chrisley's fourth season aired.

=== Chrisley Confessions ===
In August 2018, iHeartRadio released the trailer and first episode of Todd and Julie's podcast titled Chrisley Confessions.

=== Love Limo ===
In May 2022, E! greenlit the dating series Love Limo. It would have been hosted by Todd Chrisley, who also would have been the executive producer. On the show Chrisley would have tried to help single people form relationships through speed dating. In November 2022, the series was scrapped due to Chrisley's incarceration.

=== The Chrisleys: Back to Reality ===
The Chrisleys: Back to Reality premiered on September 1, 2025.

==== Episodes (2025) ====
No. overall	No. in season	Title	Original release date	US viewers (millions)
1	1	"Savannah Knows Best?"	September 1, 2025	
2	2	"O Brother Where Art Thou"	September 1, 2025	
3	3	"A Tale of Two Daughters"	September 2, 2025	
4	4	"Praying for Pardon"	September 2, 2025	
5	5	"Chasing Chase"	September 8, 2025	
6	6	"Freedom Frenzy"	September 8, 2025	
7	7	"Life After Lockup"	September 16, 2025	
8	8	TBA	September 16, 2025	
