= Julie Chrisley =

American reality-television personality and fraudster

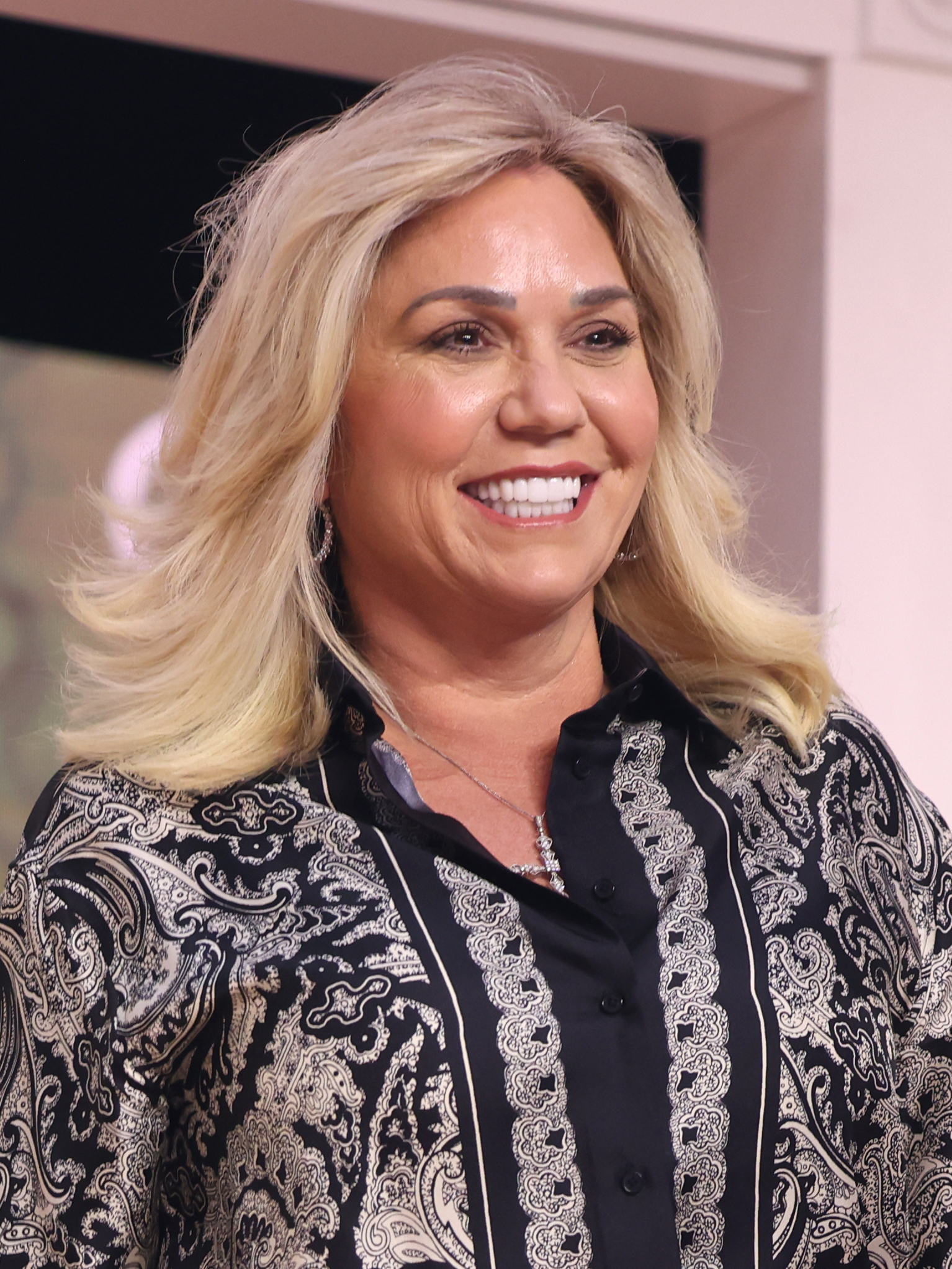
- Chrisley in 2025
- Born: Julie Hughes; January 9, 1973 (age 53); Westminster, South Carolina, U.S.
- Occupation: Reality‑television personality
- Years active: 2014–present
- Known for: Chrisley Knows Best (2014–2023)
- Criminal charges: Tax evasion, conspiracy to commit bank fraud
- Criminal penalty: Vacated by presidential pardon (Note: President Donald Trump announced the pardons on May 27, 2025.)
- Criminal status: Pardoned May 27, 2025
- Spouse: Todd Chrisley (m. 1996)
- Children: 4

Julie Chrisley (née Hughes; born January 9, 1973) is an American reality-television personality. She rose to fame as the matriarch of the USA Network series Chrisley Knows Best (2014–2023) and its spin-offs. In 2022, she and her husband, Todd Chrisley, were convicted of bank fraud and tax evasion. After a series of appeals, U.S. President Donald Trump in May 2025 granted them full presidential pardons.

== Early life ==
Julie Hughes was born in Westminster, South Carolina, to Baptist minister Harvey Hughes and his wife, Pam, and grew up in a modest double-wide trailer. She attended local schools and worked in a bank before meeting real-estate investor Todd Chrisley in the mid-1990s.

== Career ==
=== Reality television ===
Julie joined Chrisley Knows Best when it premiered on USA Network in March 2014, becoming known for her deadpan humor and traditional Southern cooking. She later hosted the digital cooking series What's Cooking with Julie Chrisley (2019) and appeared on the family spin-off Growing Up Chrisley (2019–2022).

=== Other media ===
With her husband she co-hosts the weekly podcast Chrisley Confessions, launched in 2018, discussing faith, parenting and, more recently, the couple’s legal battles.

== Fraud and tax evasion ==
=== Indictment and conviction ===
In August 2019, the Chrisleys were indicted on 12 counts including conspiracy to commit bank fraud and tax evasion. Following a three-week trial, a federal jury found both guilty on all counts in June 2022. On November 21, 2022, Julie was sentenced to seven years in prison, probation and US$17.8 million restitution, while Todd received 12 years. They reported to prison in January 2023 and filed notices of appeal the same month.

=== Appeals ===
On June 21, 2024, a three-judge panel of the Eleventh Circuit upheld the convictions but ruled that Julie’s sentencing guidelines had been miscalculated, remanding her case for resentencing. At a September 25, 2024, hearing the district court imposed the same 84-month term.

=== Presidential pardon ===
On May 27, 2025, Donald Trump told the Chrisleys’ adult children in a publicly released phone call that he intended to issue full presidential pardons for both parents, saying he hoped to “finish the paperwork within 24 hours.” A White House statement later that day confirmed the pardons had been signed. Chrisley and her husband were released from prison hours after the Trump pardon.

== Post-prison work ==
In 2026, Julie and Todd competed in season 14 of The Masked Singer as "Croissants". They were eliminated in the season 14 premiere alongside David Ortiz as "Googly Eyes", but were not fully unmasked until the beginning of the next episode.

== Personal life ==
Julie married Todd Chrisley on May 25, 1996. They have three children together—Chase (b. 1996), Savannah (b. 1997) and Grayson (b. 2006)—and Julie is step-mother to Todd’s children Lindsie and Kyle from his first marriage. In 2016, Julie and Todd adopted Chloe, the daughter of Todd’s son Kyle and a former girlfriend. They adopted Chloe because of Kyle's instances of drug usage and legal troubles. After Julie and Todd were sentenced, Savannah adopted Grayson and Chloe.

=== Health ===
In 2012, at age 39, Julie was diagnosed with early-stage breast cancer and underwent a double mastectomy followed by reconstructive surgery. She has been in remission since.

== Filmography ==
Year	Title	Role	Notes
2014–2023	Chrisley Knows Best	Herself	Series regular
2017	According to Chrisley	Herself	Guest
2019–2022	Growing Up Chrisley	Herself	Recurring
2019	What's Cooking with Julie Chrisley	Host	Web series

== See also ==
- List of people granted executive clemency in the second Trump presidency
