= Wanted Man Tour =

2026 concert tour by Benson Boone

- Tour by Benson Boone
- Promotional poster
- Location: Asia; Australia; United States
- Associated album: American Heart
- Start date: July 7, 2026
- End date: November 19, 2026
- No. of shows: 47
- Supporting acts: Olivia O'Brien; Ashe; Luna Li; Ruel
- Website: bensonboone.com

Benson Boone concert chronology
- American Heart World Tour (2025-2026); Wanted Man Tour (2026)

The Wanted Man Tour is the fourth concert tour by American singer-songwriter Benson Boone. It is the second tour in support of his second studio album, American Heart (2025). The tour spans 47 shows across Australasia, and the United States. It began in Pittsburgh, United States, on July 7, 2026, and concluded in Sydney, Australia, on November 19, 2026.

== Announcements ==
On March 29, 2026, Benson Boone announced the Wanted Man Tour, the second concert tour in support of his second studio album, American Heart (2025). The tour's initial itinerary comprised over 30 shows across the United States, beginning in Pittsburgh on July 7 and concluding in Casper, Wyoming, on September 3. A pre-sale began on April 1, followed by the general sale on April 3. On August 2, the Spokane show scheduled for that day was postponed to September 6 due to the 2026 Washington wildfires. On August 7, Boone ended his San Jose performance early after experiencing vocal problems, and the following day's show in Sacramento was postponed to September 9 for the same reason. Olivia O'Brien served as the tour's opening act through July 28, followed by Ashe from July 30 to August 15 and Luna Li from August 17 through the end of the US run.

On July 8, nine Australian shows in Brisbane, Melbourne, and Sydney were announced for November. On July 13, Boone announced ticketing details for the Asia-Pacific leg, which also included shows in South Korea on October 26, Japan on October 29, and Singapore on November 2.

== Set list ==
This set list is from the concert in Pittsburgh, United States, on July 7, 2026.

1. "Sorry I'm Here for Someone Else"
2. "Mr Electric Blue"
3. "There She Goes"
4. "Wanted Man"
5. "Drunk in My Mind"
6. "Slow It Down"
7. "Mystical Magical"
8. "Pretty Slowly"
9. "In the Stars"
10. "My Greatest Fear"
11. "Take Me Home"
12. "Young American Heart"
13. "Love You Again"
14. "Momma Song"
15. "Before You"
16. "The Time of My Life"
17. "What Do You Want"
18. "I Wanna Be the One You Call"
19. "What Was"
20. "Cry"
21. "Beautiful Things"

== Tour dates ==
List of 2026 concerts
| Date (2026) | City | Country | Venue | Supporting act(s) |
|---|---|---|---|---|
| July 7 | Pittsburgh | United States | PPG Paints Arena | Olivia O'Brien |
| July 8 | Baltimore | United States | CFG Bank Arena | Olivia O'Brien |
| July 10 | New York City (Note: Billed as Brooklyn) | United States | Barclays Center | Olivia O'Brien |
| July 11 | New York City | United States | Barclays Center | Olivia O'Brien |
| July 13 | Newark | United States | Prudential Center | Olivia O'Brien |
| July 15 | Boston | United States | TD Garden | Olivia O'Brien |
| July 16 | Albany | United States | MVP Arena | Olivia O'Brien |
| July 18 | Cincinnati | United States | Heritage Bank Center | Olivia O'Brien |
| July 19 | Indianapolis | United States | Gainbridge Fieldhouse | Olivia O'Brien |
| July 22 | Milwaukee | United States | Fiserv Forum | Olivia O'Brien |
| July 24 | Rosemont | United States | Allstate Arena | Olivia O'Brien |
| July 25 | Rosemont | United States | Allstate Arena | Olivia O'Brien |
| July 27 | St. Louis | United States | Enterprise Center | Olivia O'Brien |
| July 28 | Tulsa | United States | BOK Center | Olivia O'Brien |
| July 30 | Denver | United States | Ball Arena | Ashe |
| August 4 | Seattle | United States | Climate Pledge Arena | Ashe |
| August 5 | Portland | United States | Moda Center | Ashe |
| August 7 | San Jose | United States | SAP Center at San Jose | Ashe |
| August 10 | Los Angeles | United States | Crypto.com Arena | Ashe |
| August 11 | Los Angeles | United States | Crypto.com Arena | Ashe |
| August 14 | Paradise (Note: Billed as Las Vegas) | United States | T-Mobile Arena | Ashe |
| August 15 | San Diego | United States | Pechanga Arena | Ashe |
| August 17 | Phoenix | United States | Mortgage Matchup Center | Luna Li |
| August 20 | San Antonio | United States | Frost Bank Center | Luna Li |
| August 21 | Dallas | United States | American Airlines Center | Luna Li |
| August 23 | New Orleans | United States | Smoothie King Center | Luna Li |
| August 25 | Jacksonville | United States | VyStar Veterans Memorial Arena | Luna Li |
| August 26 | Charlotte | United States | Spectrum Center | Luna Li |
| August 28 | Birmingham | United States | Legacy Arena | Luna Li |
| August 29 | North Little Rock | United States | Simmons Bank Arena | Luna Li |
| August 31 | Kansas City | United States | T-Mobile Center | Luna Li |
| September 1 | Omaha | United States | CHI Health Center | Luna Li |
| September 3 | Casper | United States | Ford Wyoming Center | Luna Li |
| September 6 (Note: This concert was originally scheduled on August 2, 2026, but was rescheduled due to the 2026 Washington wildfires.) | Spokane | United States | Numerica Veterans Arena | Luna Li |
| September 9 (Note: This concert was originally scheduled on August 8, 2026, but was rescheduled due to vocal issues.) | Sacramento | United States | Golden1 Center | Luna Li |
| October 26 | Goyang (Note: Billed as Seoul) | South Korea | Kintex | Ruel |
| October 29 | Tokyo | Japan | Toyota Arena | Ruel |
| November 2 | Singapore | | The Star Theatre | Ruel |
| November 6 | Brisbane | Australia | Brisbane Entertainment Centre | Ruel |
| November 7 | Brisbane | Australia | Brisbane Entertainment Centre | Ruel |
| November 8 | Brisbane | Australia | Brisbane Entertainment Centre | Ruel |
| November 12 | Melbourne | Australia | Rod Laver Arena | Ruel |
| November 13 | Melbourne | Australia | Rod Laver Arena | Ruel |
| November 14 | Melbourne | Australia | Rod Laver Arena | Ruel |
| November 17 | Sydney | Australia | Afterpay Arena | Ruel |
| November 18 | Sydney | Australia | Afterpay Arena | Ruel |
| November 19 | Sydney | Australia | Afterpay Arena | Ruel |
