= American Heart =

American Heart may refer to:

- American Heart (film), a 1993 film directed by Martin Bell
- "American Heart" (song), a 2012 song by Faith Hill
- American Heart (Adrenalin album), 1984
- American Heart (Benson Boone album), 2025
- Young American Heart, a 2025 song by Benson Boone
- American Heart, a 2017 novel by Laura Moriarty

== See also ==
- American Hearts, album by A.A. Bondy
- American Hearts (card game), an alternative name for Black Lady
- Heart of America (disambiguation)
