= The Masked Singer (American TV series) season 14 =

The Masked Singer
- Season 14
- Promotional poster for season fourteen, featuring "Eggplant".
- Starring: Robin Thicke; Jenny McCarthy Wahlberg; Ken Jeong; Rita Ora
- Hosted by: Nick Cannon
- No. of contestants: 18
- Winner: Ashlee Simpson as "Galaxy Girl"
- Runner-up: Phillip Phillips as "Pugcasso"
- No. of episodes: 12

Release
- Original network: Fox
- Original release: January 7 – April 1, 2026

Season chronology
- ← Previous; Season 13

The fourteenth season of the American television series The Masked Singer premiered on Fox on January 7, 2026, and concluded on April 1, 2026. The season was won by singer and actress Ashlee Simpson as "Galaxy Girl", with singer Phillip Phillips finishing second as "Pugcasso", actress and singer Kylie Cantrall placing third as "Cat Witch", and singer Normani placing fourth as "Crane".

== Panelists and host ==
Season 14 panelists and host

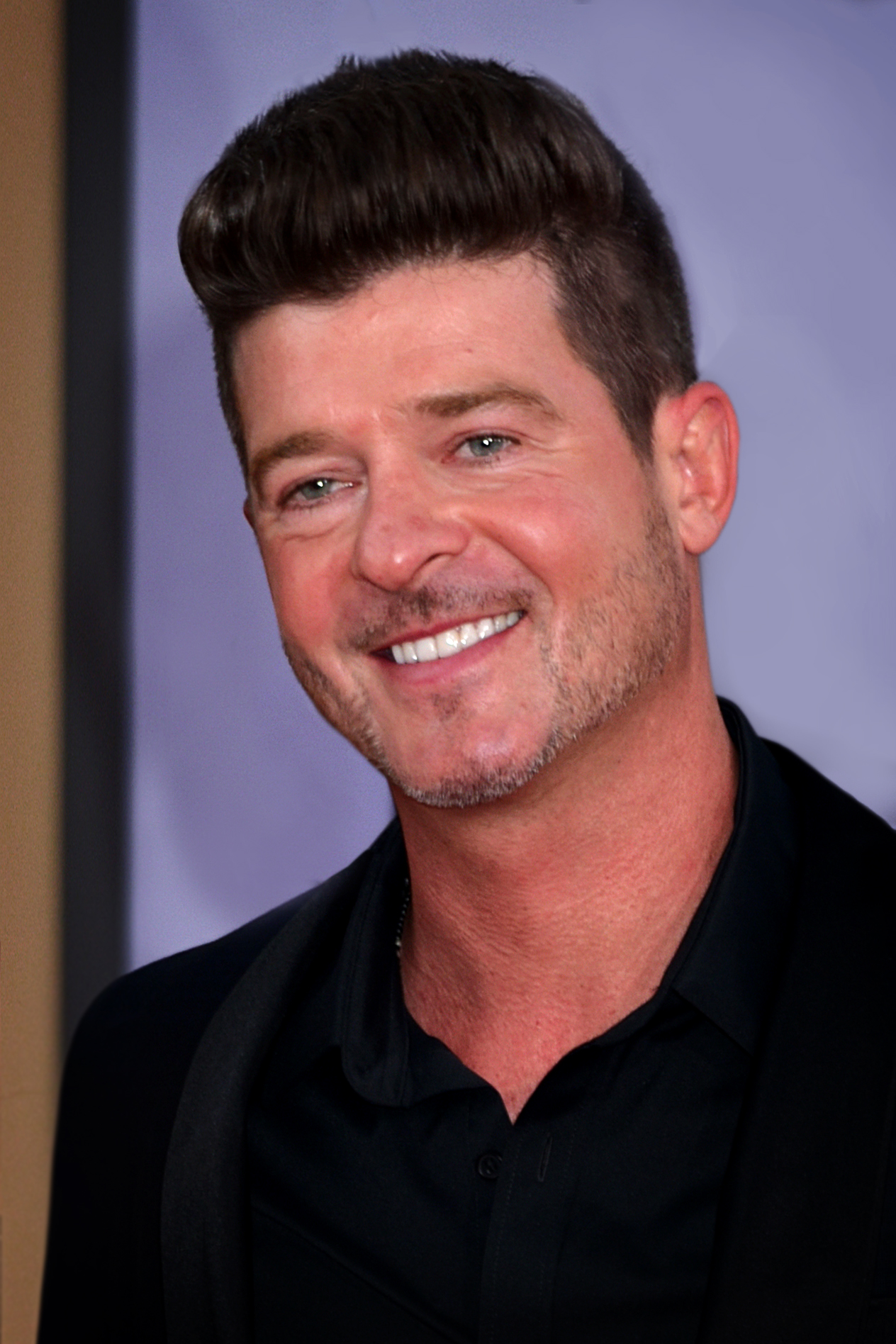
Robin Thicke

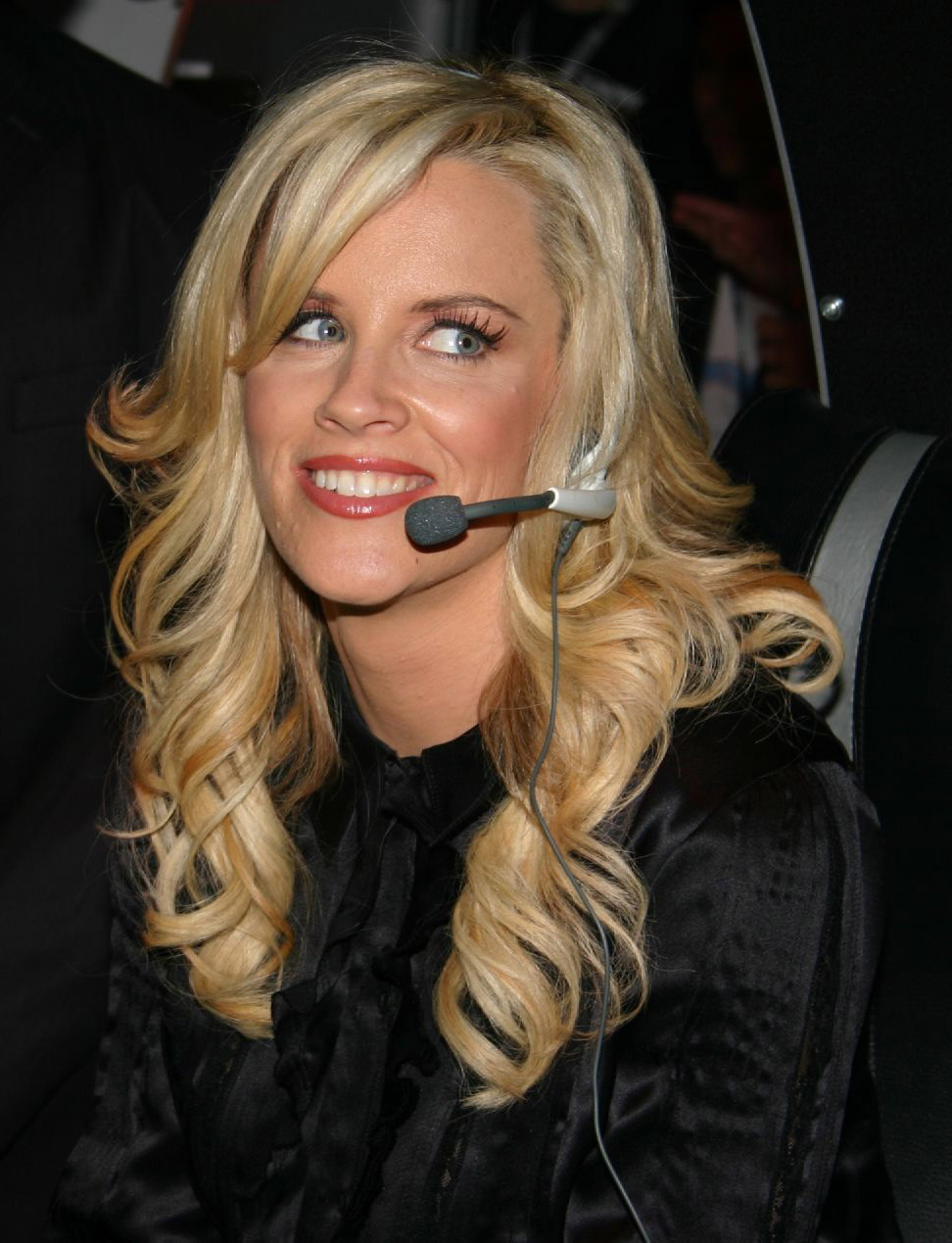
Jenny McCarthy Wahlberg

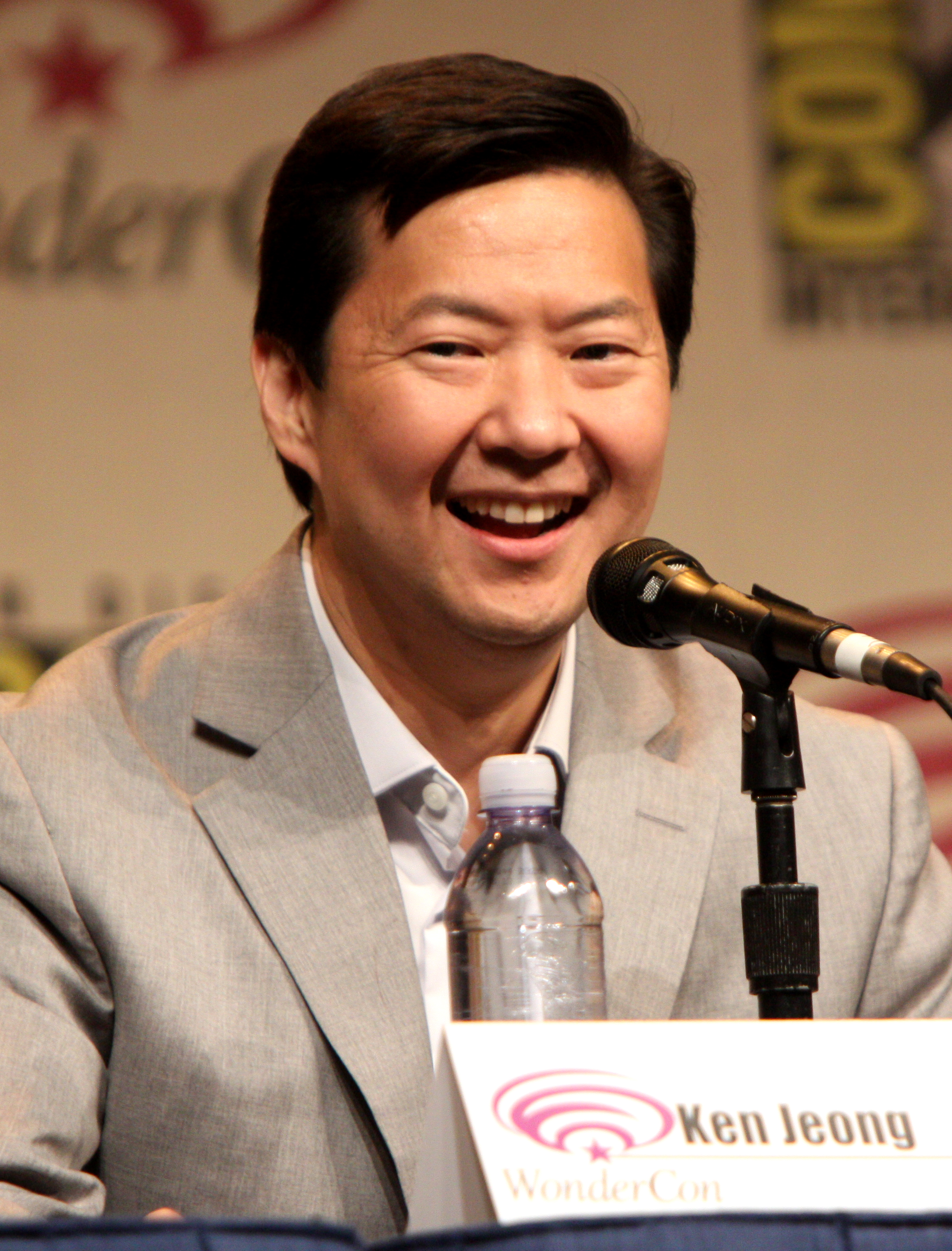
Ken Jeong

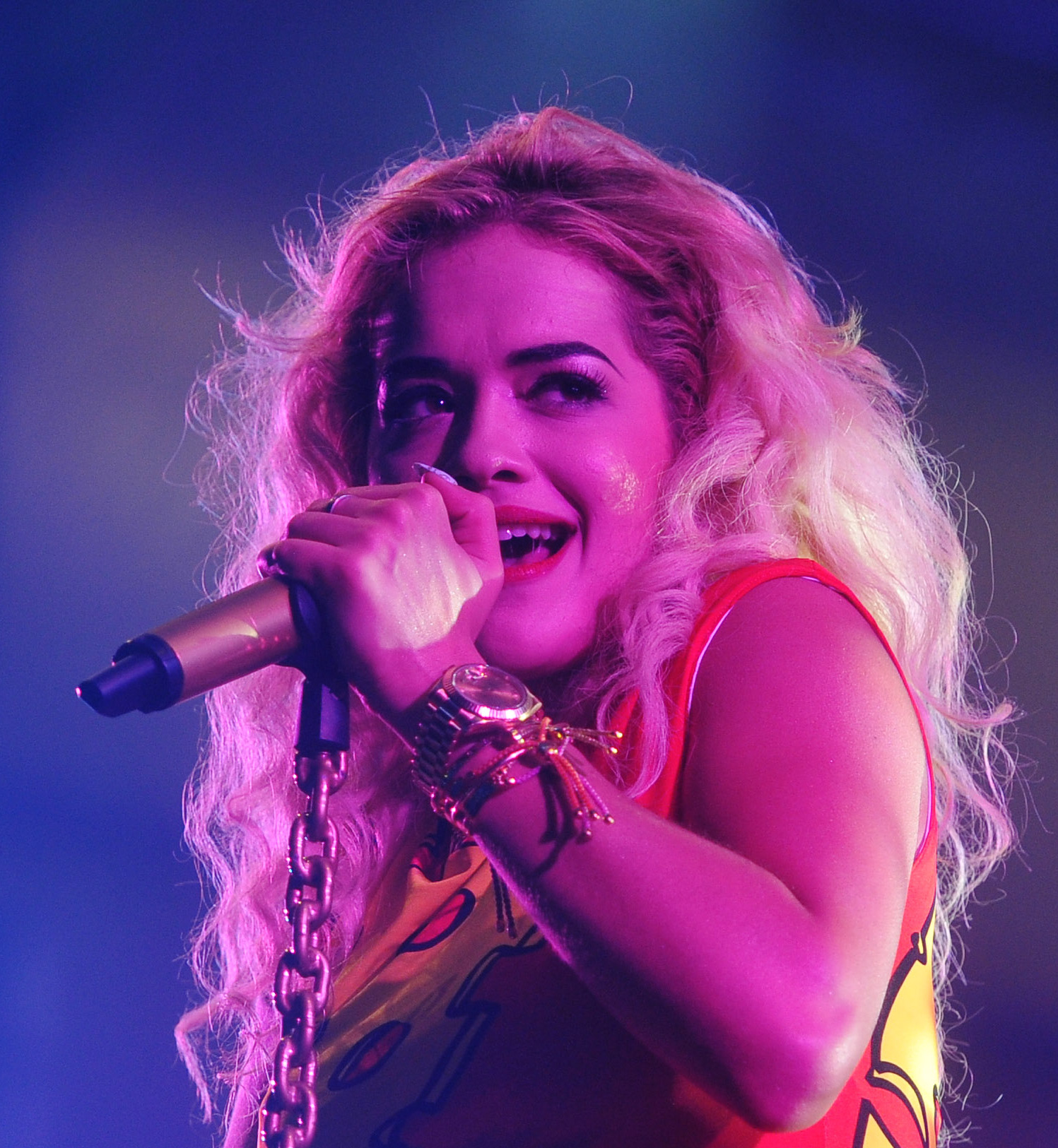
Rita Ora

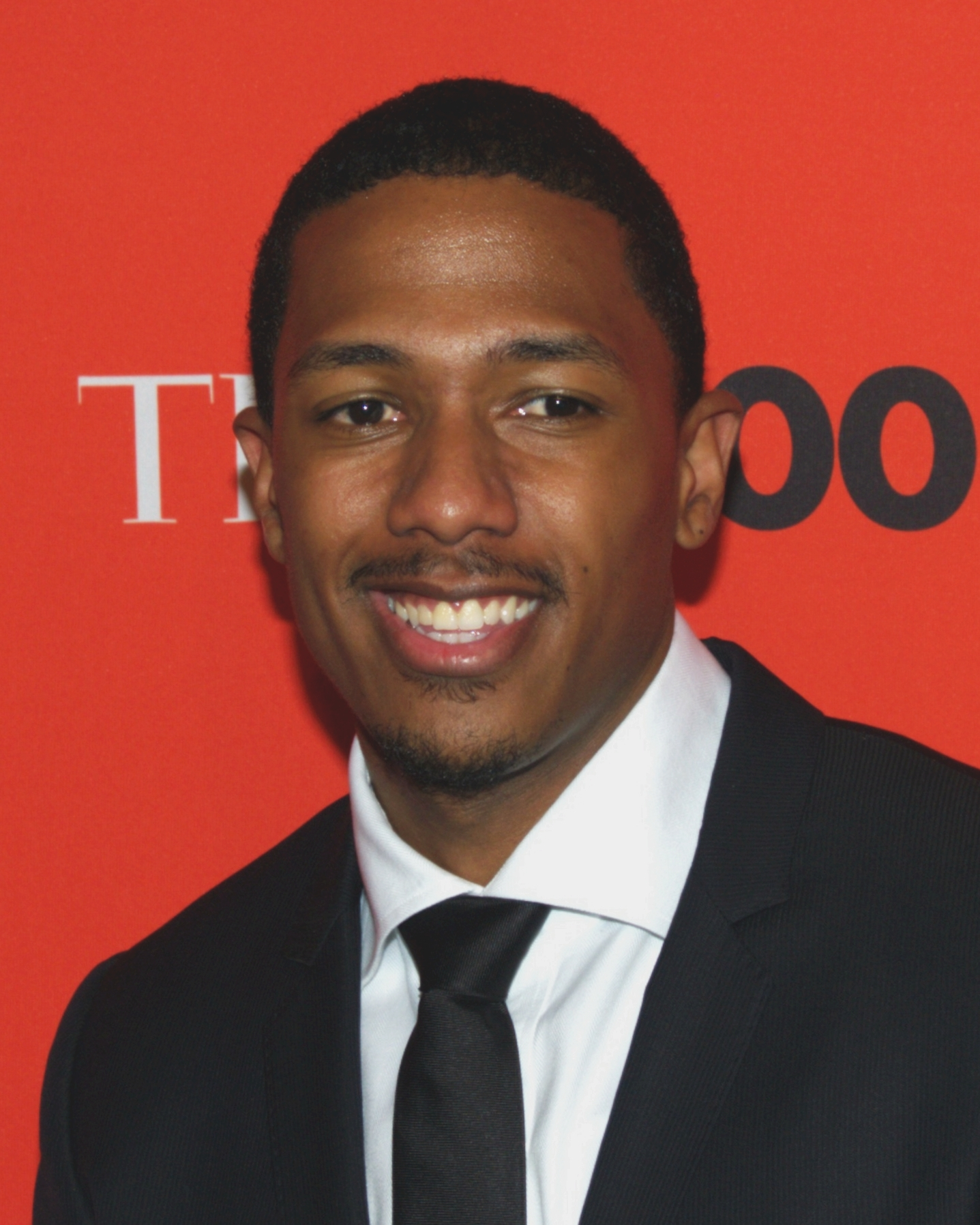
Nick Cannon

Host Nick Cannon, singer-songwriter Robin Thicke, television and radio personality Jenny McCarthy Wahlberg, actor and comedian Ken Jeong and recording artist Rita Ora all returned from the previous three seasons.

Johnny Knoxville appeared as a special guest during the second episode to promote his role as host of Fear Factor: House of Fear. The Teenage Mutant Ninja Turtles appeared in the fourth episode. Christina Perri appeared in the sixth and ninth episodes. The seventh episode featured Taraji P. Henson, who portrayed "Scarab" earlier in the season, as a guest panelist, and Spencer Pratt as a special guest. The eighth episode featured Kelly Osbourne, who portrayed "Ladybug" in the second season, as a guest panelist, and a brief guest appearance from Slipknot's Sid Wilson, Osbourne's fiancé. The Care Bears appeared in the ninth episode. Johnny Gill appeared in the tenth episode. Khalid, Meg Donnelly, Randy Jackson, and Jessica Simpson appeared in the season finale.

== Production ==
On May 7, 2025, it was announced that Fox renewed the series for a fourteenth season, prior to the airing of the thirteenth season's finale later that same day. The season was announced to premiere in January 2026, skipping its usual fall season slot for 2025. On November 11, 2025, it was announced that the season would premiere on January 7, 2026.

The fifth episode was delayed an hour by NASCAR coverage, which was in turn delayed by rain. The sixth episode began with a dedication for James Van Der Beek, who portrayed "Griffin" in the previous season, and had died earlier in the day. The season finale was interrupted by a Presidential Address to the Nation, and was continued afterwards. This season was also the only one to be produced under the Fox Entertainment Studios label and the last one to be produced under Fox Entertainment as a whole. Eureka Productions (owned by Fremantle) is set to take production of the show over from Fox with the 15th season.

== Contestants ==
The contestants are said to boast a combined total of 94 million records sold, 21 platinum singles, 3 Emmy wins, 3 Hall of Fame inductions, 3 World Series wins, and 54,438,600 Instagram followers. On December 10, it was revealed that actor and singer Kylie Cantrall was among the contestants, acting as a behind-the-scenes insider, with the panel being completely unaware of her participation and the viewers left to guess which mask she is under; the season premiere episode revealed her identity as "Cat Witch".

This season made history as the first time a couple competed against each other with Ashlee Simpson (Galaxy Girl) competing against Evan Ross (Stingray).

Stage name	Celebrity	Occupation(s)	Episodes											
Stage name	Celebrity	Occupation(s)	1	2	3	4	5	6	7	8	9	10	11	12
Galaxy Girl	Ashlee Simpson	Singer/actor	WIN			SAFE				SAFE		SAFE	SAFE	WINNER
Pugcasso	Phillip Phillips	Singer	WIN		SAFE				SAFE		SAFE		SAFE	RUNNER-UP
Cat Witch	Kylie Cantrall (Note: Prior to the start of the season, Cantrall was revealed to be serving as 'America's Insider'. In the season premiere, a video message from Cantrall to the at-home viewing audience revealed her to be in the "Cat Witch" costume.)	Actor/singer	WIN			SAFE		SAFE				SAFE	SAFE	THIRD
Crane (WC)	Normani	Singer			SAFE				RISK		SAFE		SAFE	FOURTH
Pangolin (WC)	Rachel Platten	Singer					SAFE			SAFE	RISK		OUT	
Stingray	Evan Ross	Actor/musician	WIN			SAFE		RISK				OUT		
14 Karat Carrot (WC)	Judge Greg Mathis	Judge/TV personality				SAFE		SAFE				OUT		
High Voltage	Alexi Lalas	Former soccer player/sportscaster		SAFE			SAFE			RISK	OUT			
Eggplant	Jack Wagner	Actor/singer		SAFE			SAFE			OUT				
Snow Cone	Heidi Montag (Note: Her husband, Spencer Pratt, was in the background of the performances as a snow cone-headed character that was later named "Mr. Snow Cone".)	TV personality/singer	RISK		SAFE				OUT					
Owl	Billy Ray Cyrus	Singer/actor		SAFE			SAFE	OUT						
Calla Lily	Teddi Mellencamp	TV personality/podcast host		SAFE			OUT							
Queen Corgi	Claudia Oshry	Influencer/podcast host	RISK			WD (Note: Oshry forfeited before Cannon revealed the vote.)								
Scarab	Taraji P. Henson	Actor	WIN		OUT									
Handyman	Tone Loc	Rapper/actor	RISK		OUT									
Le Who Who	Tiffany Haddish	Actor/comedian		OUT										
Croissants	Todd Chrisley	TV personalities	OUT (Note: While eliminated in the first episode, the Croissants were unmasked at the beginning of the second episode.)											
Croissants	Julie Chrisley	TV personalities	OUT											
Googly Eyes	David "Big Papi" Ortiz	Former MLB player/sportscaster	OUT											

- WIN The masked singer won with their performance and advanced in the competition.
- SAFE The masked singer was safe from elimination.
- RISK The masked singer was in the bottom two/five, but was not eliminated.
- OUT The masked singer was eliminated from the competition and unmasked.
- WD The masked singer forfeited and left the competition.
- The masked singer did not perform.

(WC) This masked singer is a wild card contestant.

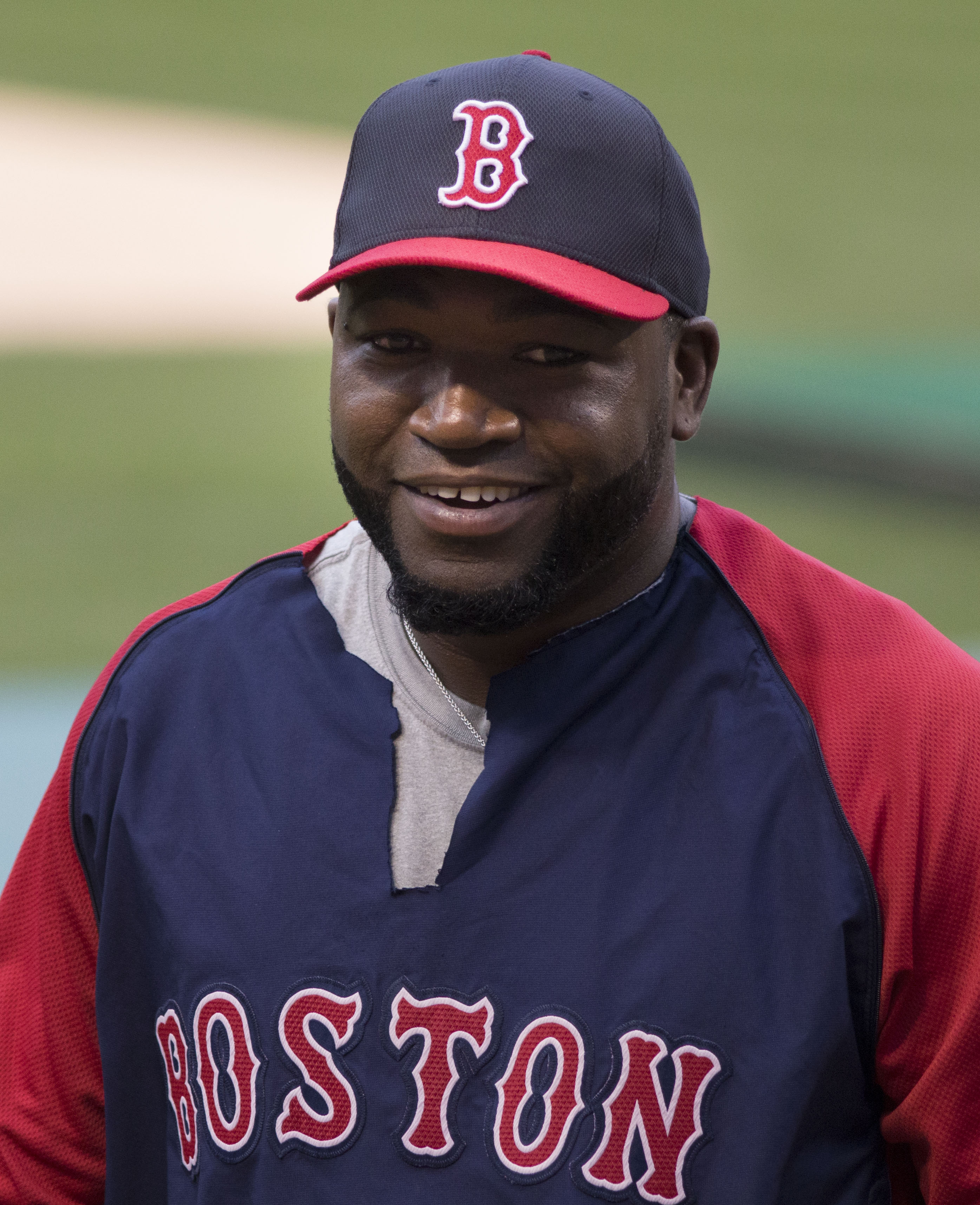
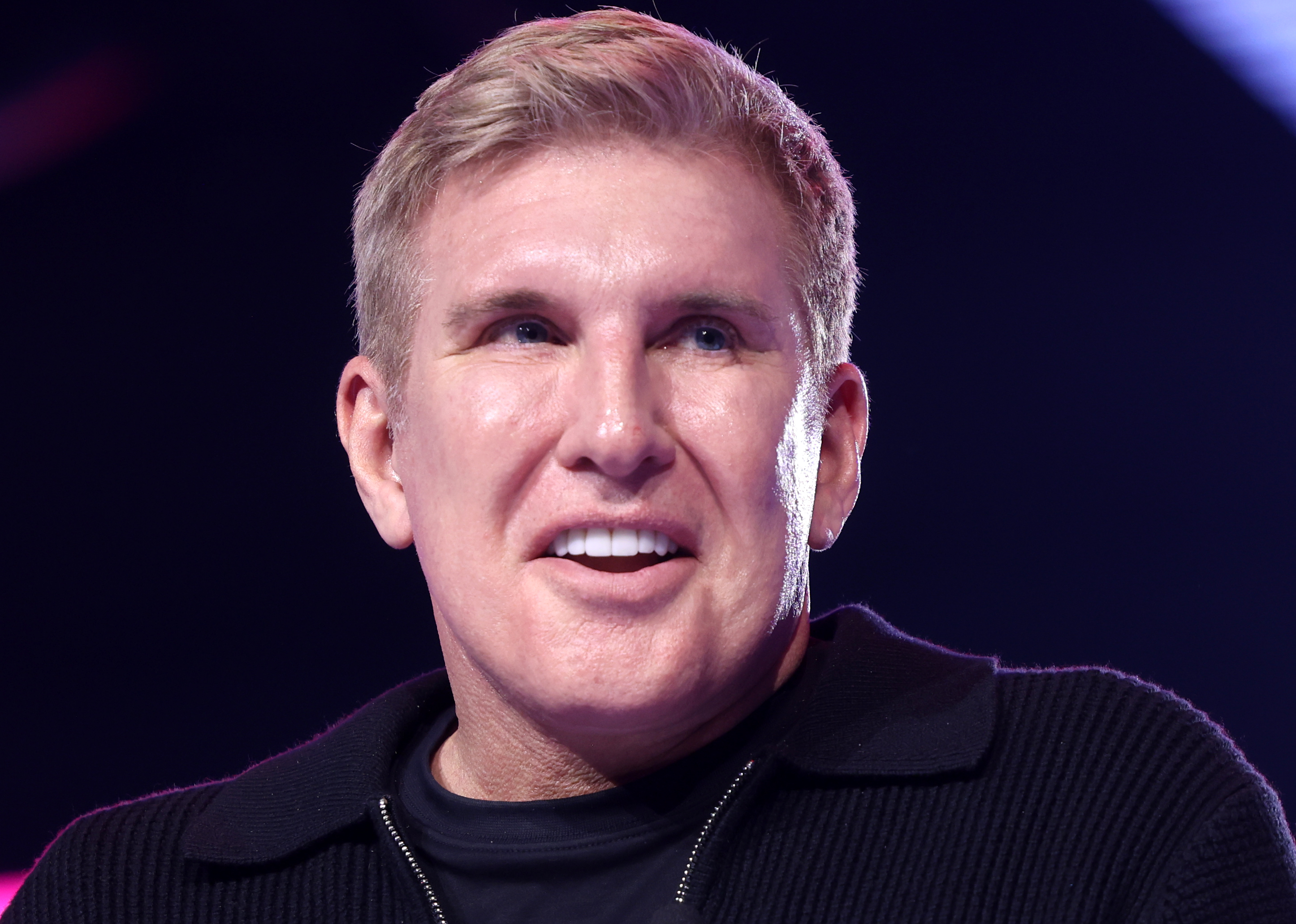
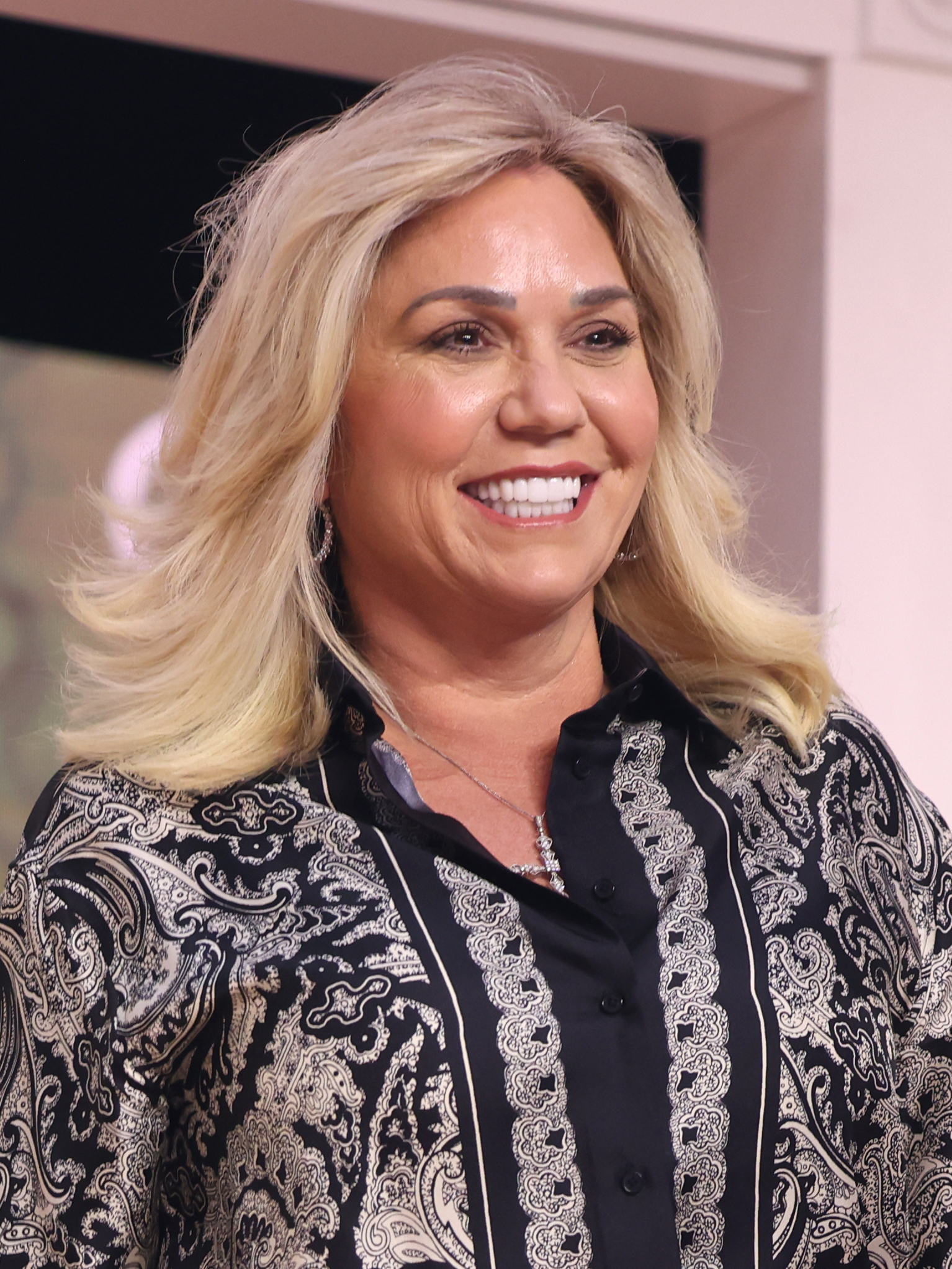
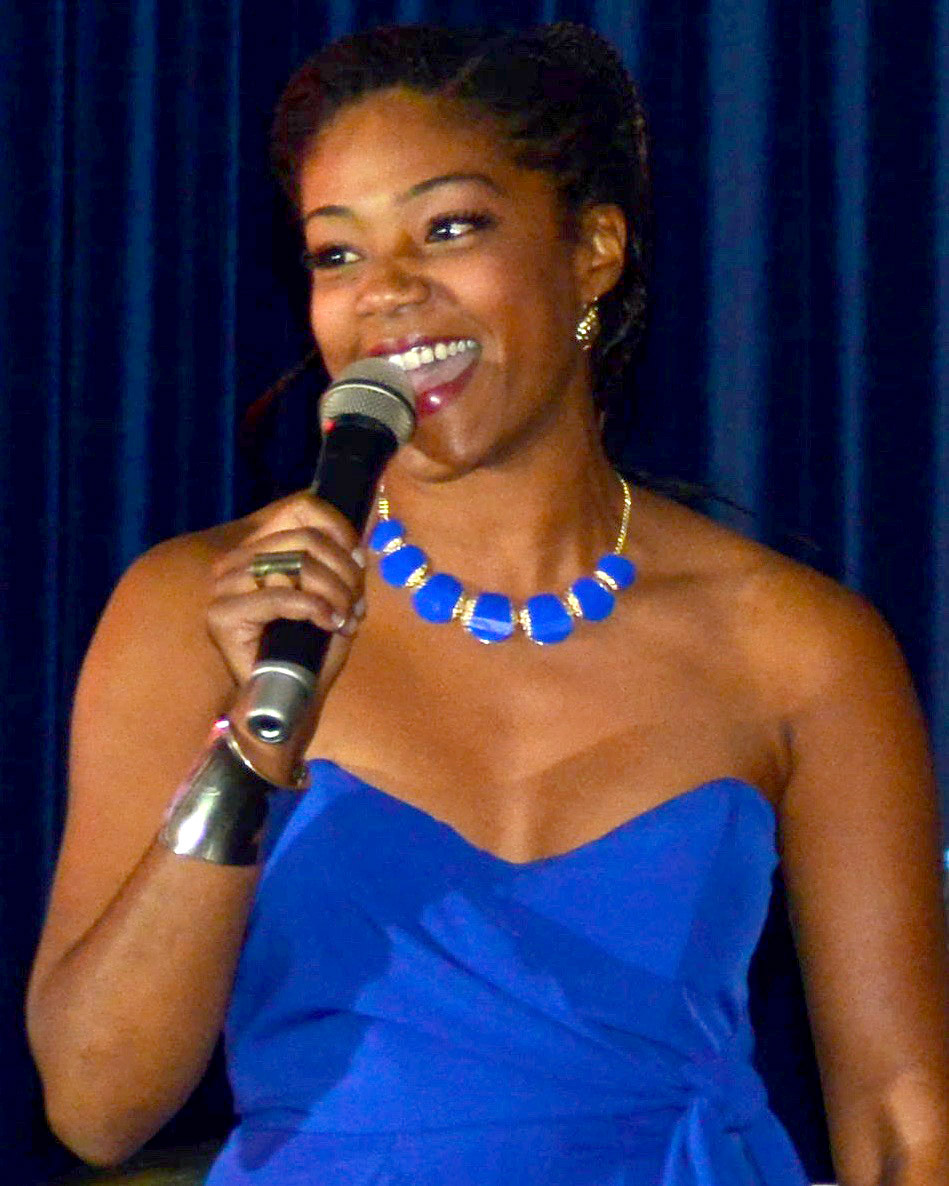
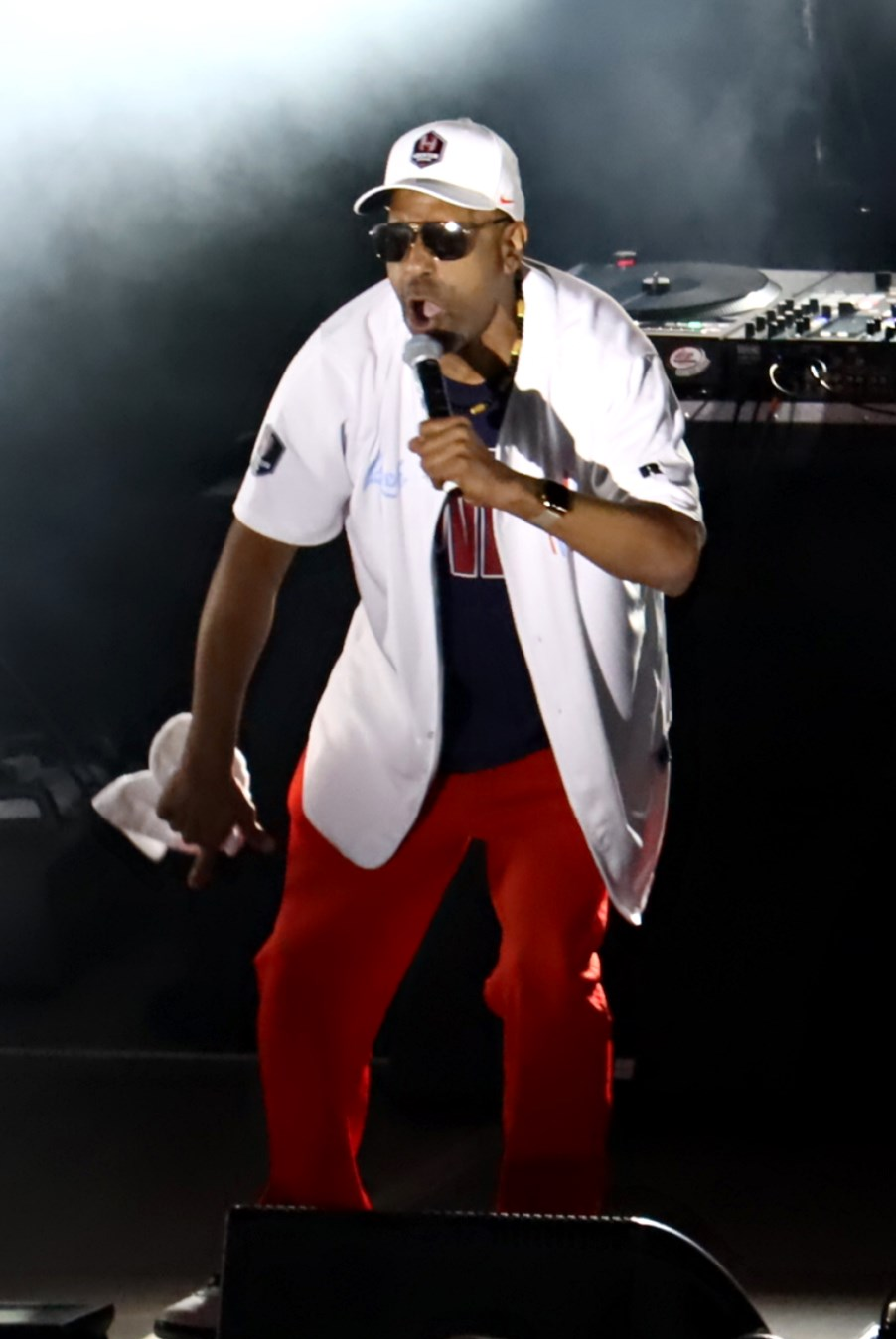
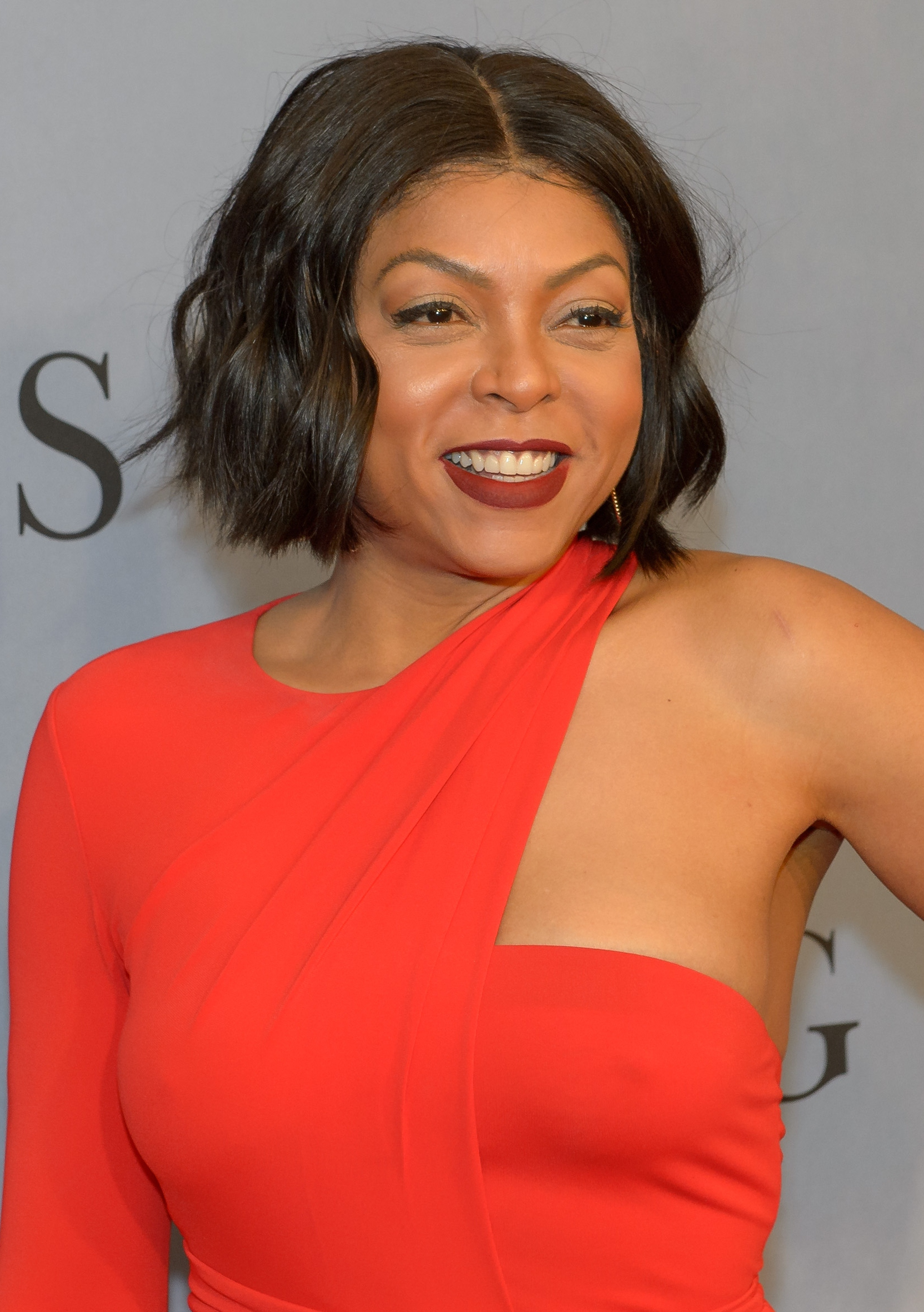
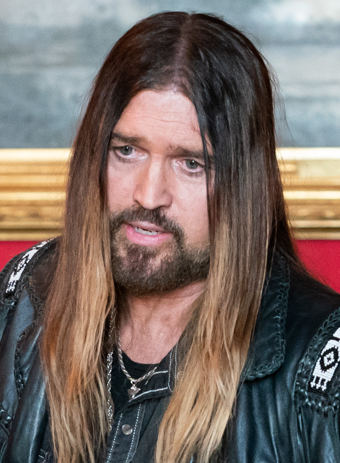
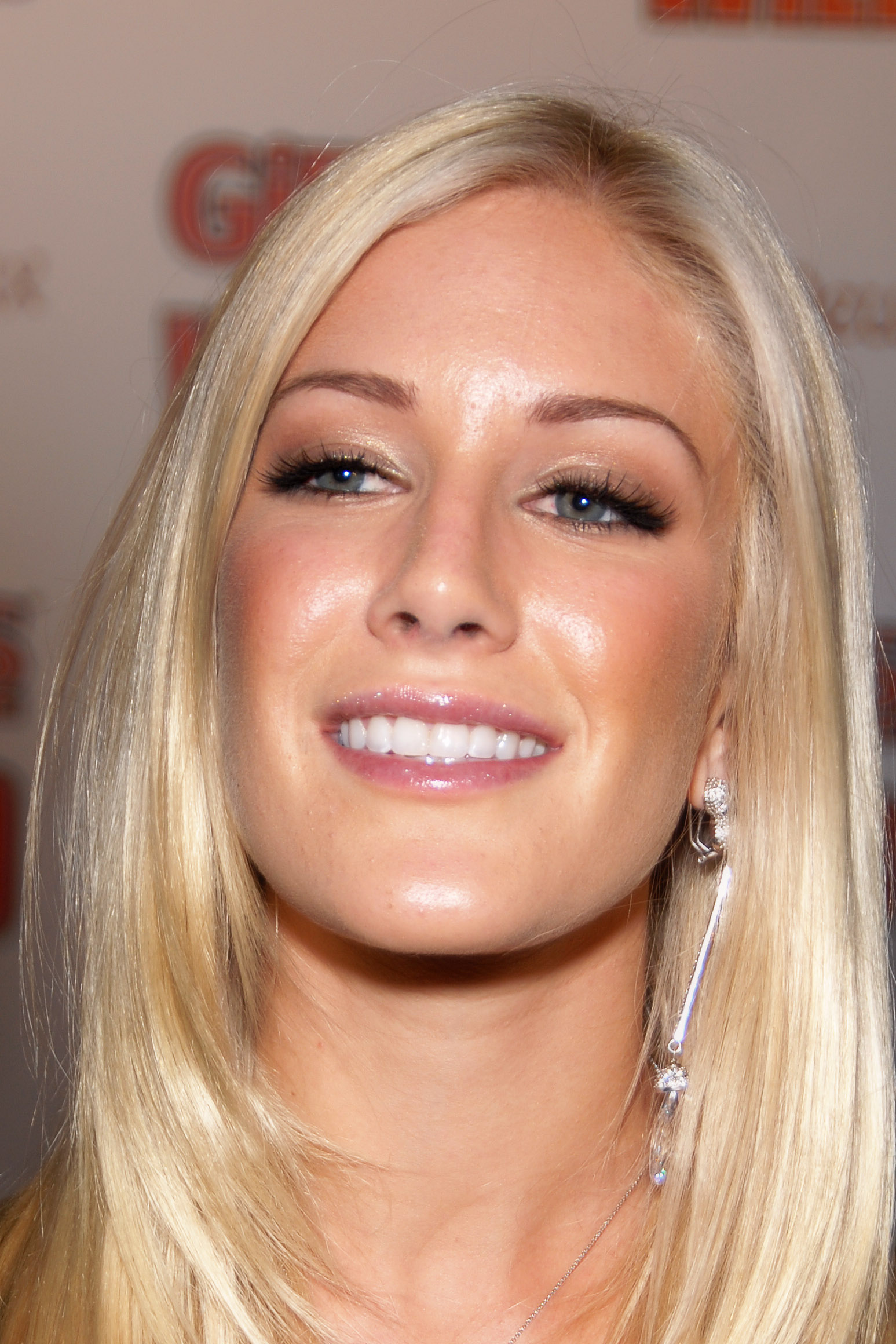
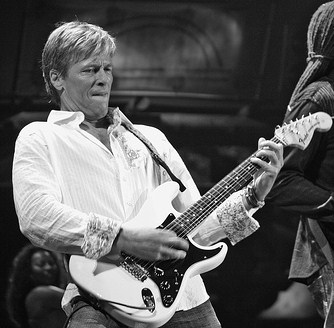
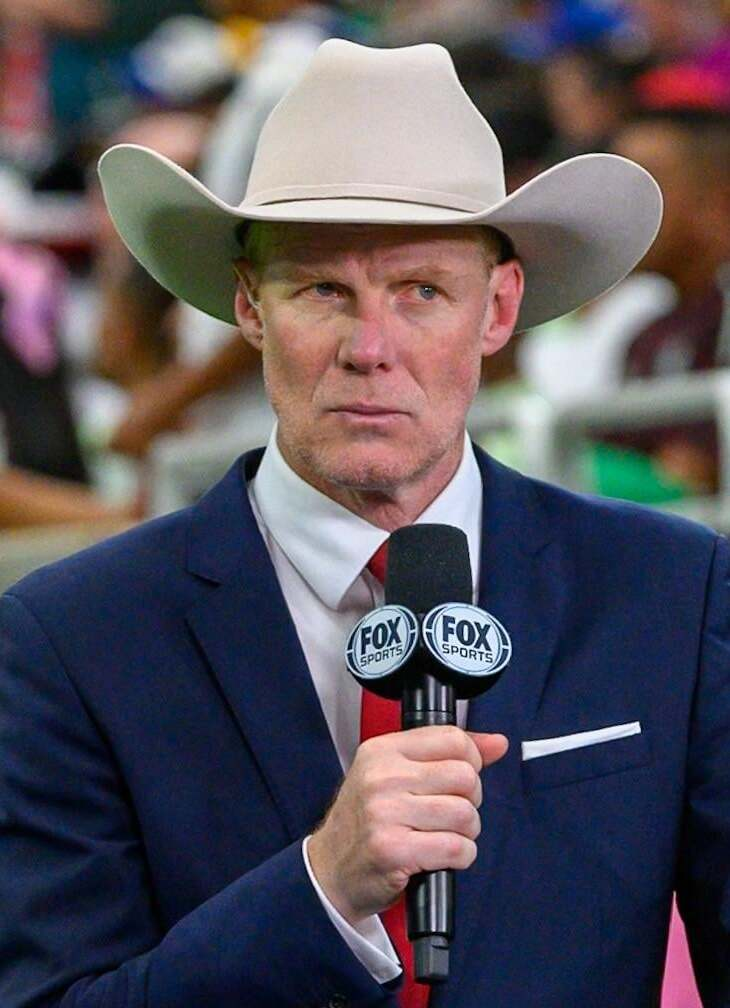
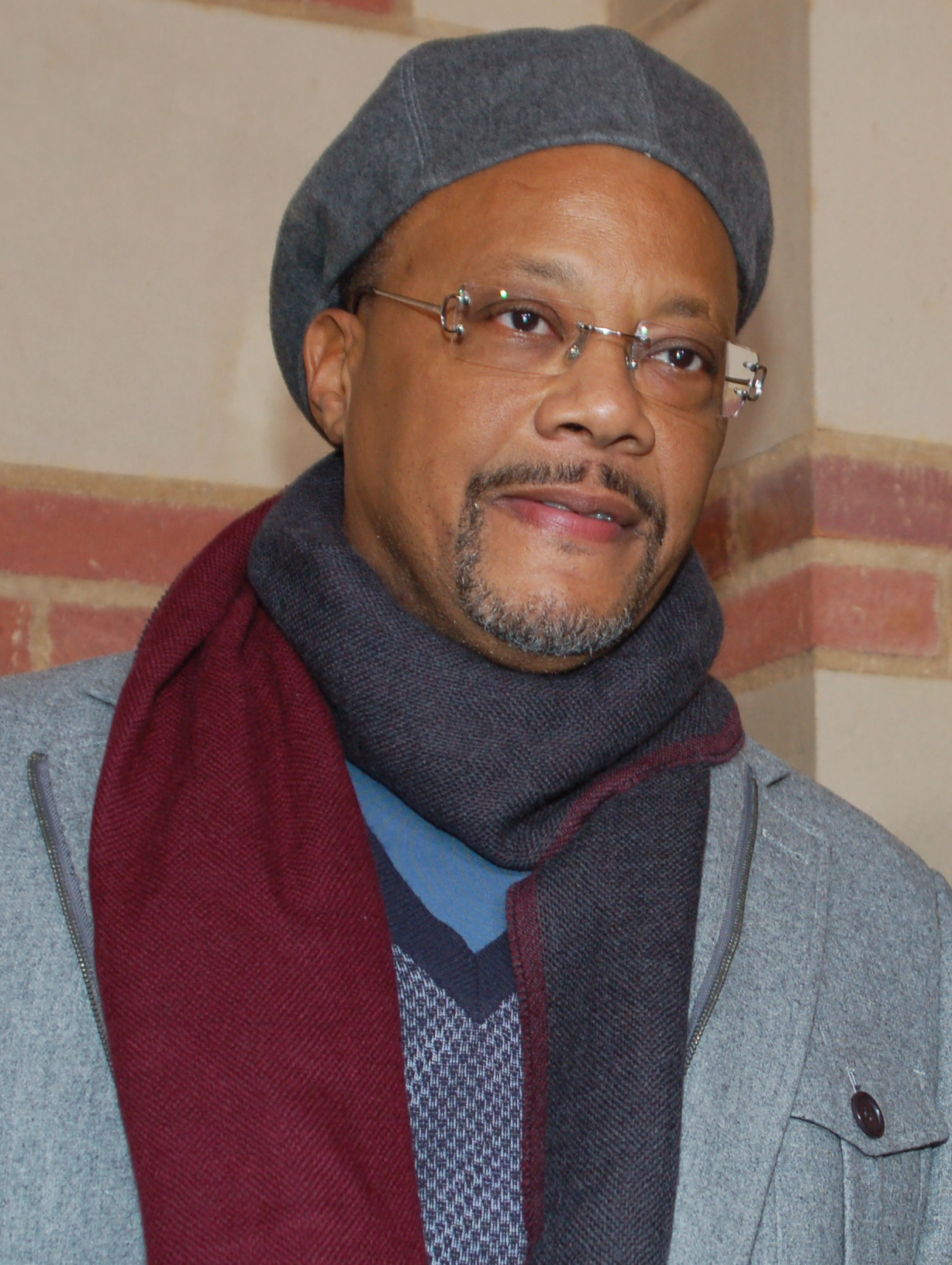
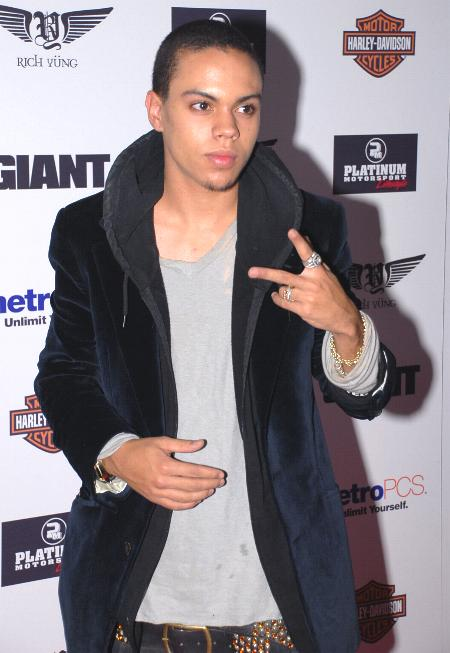
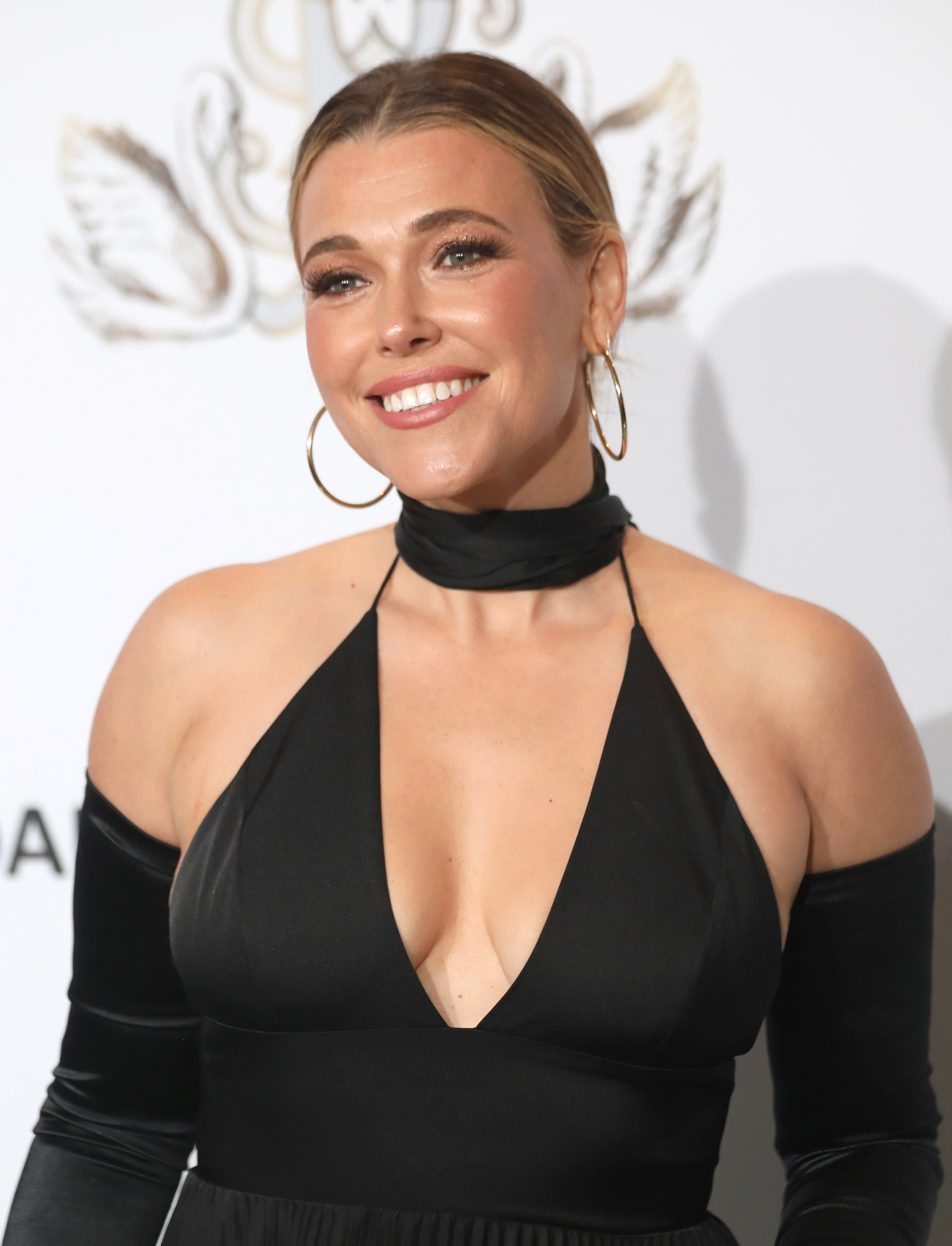
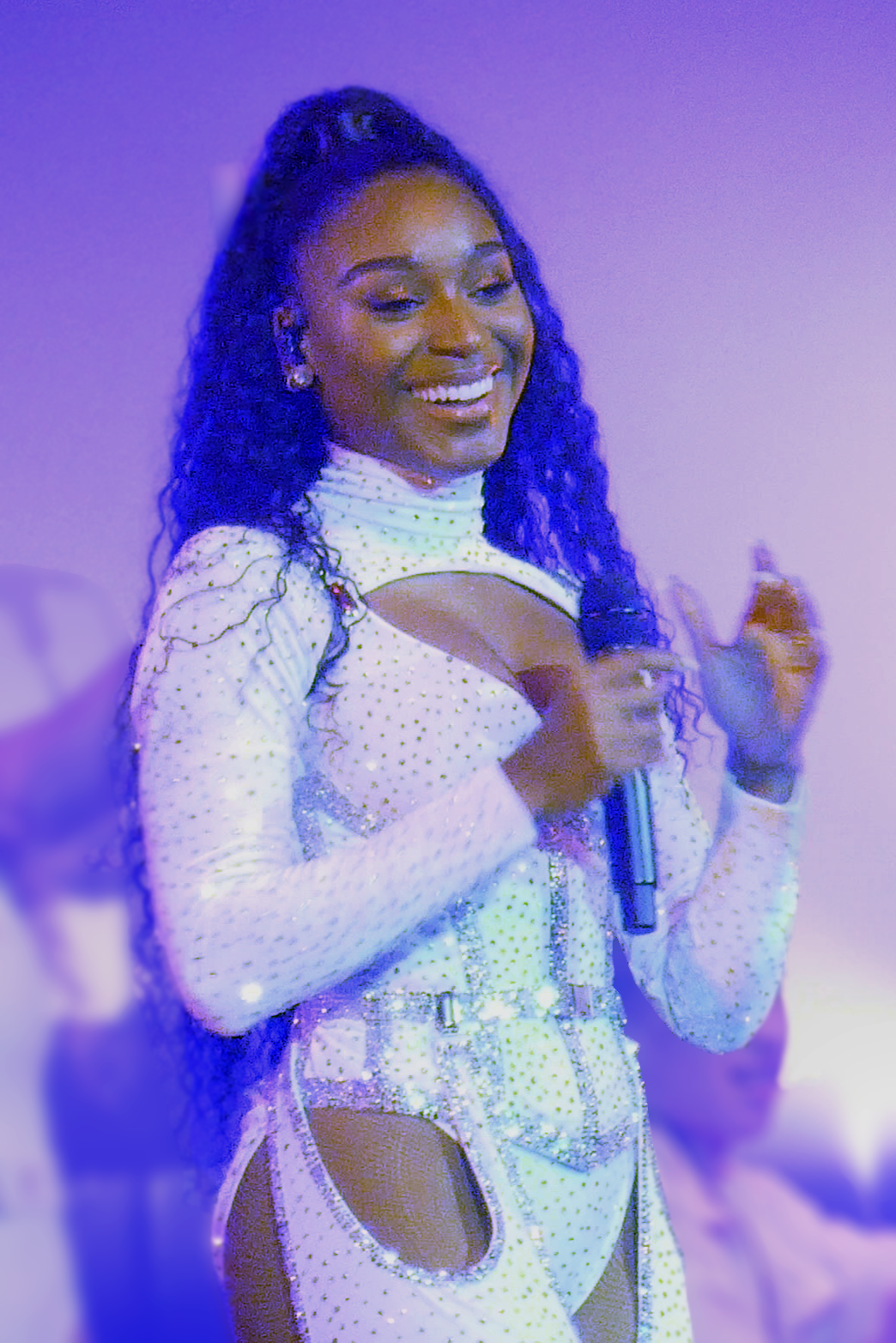
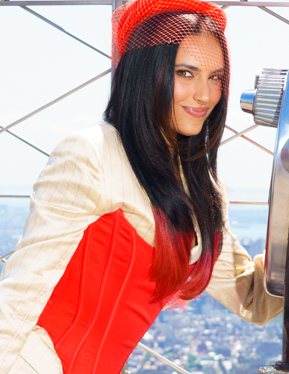
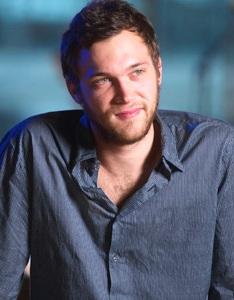
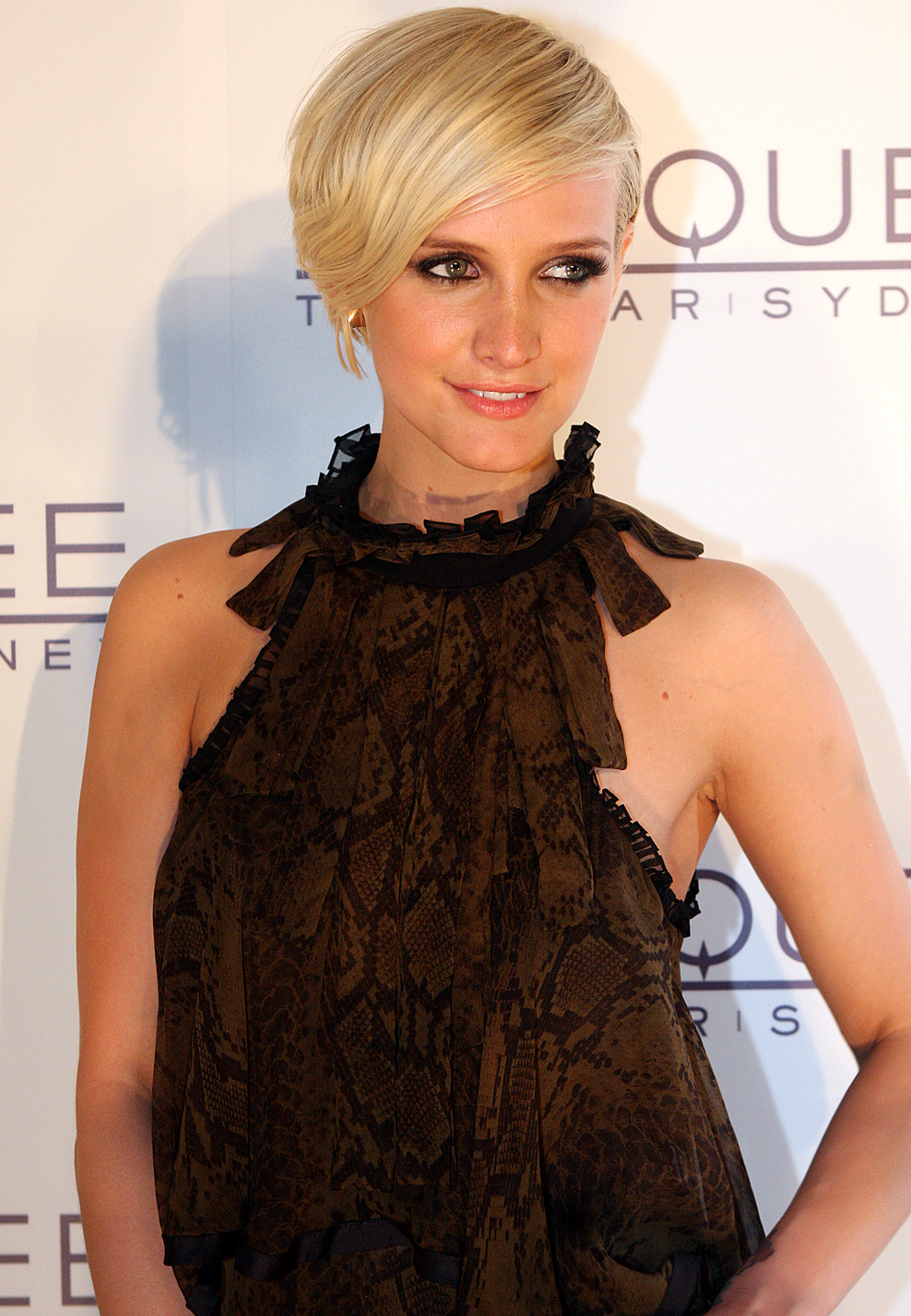
The celebrities who competed in the fourteenth season of The Masked Singer, pictured in order of elimination (L-R):
David "Big Papi" Ortiz ("Googly Eyes"), Todd and Julie Chrisley ("Croissants"), Tiffany Haddish ("Le Who Who"), Tone Loc ("Handyman"), Taraji P. Henson ("Scarab"), Billy Ray Cyrus ("Owl"), Heidi Montag ("Snow Cone"), Jack Wagner ("Eggplant"), Alexi Lalas ("High Voltage"), Judge Greg Mathis ("14 Karat Carrot"), Evan Ross ("Stingray"), Rachel Platten ("Pangolin"), Normani ("Crane"), Kylie Cantrall ("Cat Witch"), Phillip Phillips ("Pugcasso"), and Ashlee Simpson ("Galaxy Girl")

Not pictured: Claudia Oshry ("Queen Corgi") and Teddi Mellencamp ("Calla Lily")

== Episodes ==
=== Week 1 (January 7) ===
Guest performance: The panel performs "Golden" by Huntrix

Performances on the first episode
#	Stage name	Song	Identity	Result
1	Galaxy Girl	"Super Graphic Ultra Modern Girl" by Chappell Roan	undisclosed	WIN
2	Handyman	"Shake Your Groove Thing" by Peaches & Herb	undisclosed	RISK
3	Pugcasso	"Ordinary" by Alex Warren	undisclosed	WIN
4	Queen Corgi	"Don't Rain on My Parade" by Barbra Streisand	undisclosed	RISK
5	Scarab	"Set Fire to the Rain" by Adele	undisclosed	WIN
6	Croissants	"Jailhouse Rock" by Elvis Presley	Todd & Julie Chrisley	OUT
7	Snow Cone	"When I Grow Up" by The Pussycat Dolls	undisclosed	RISK
8	Stingray	"Stayin' Alive" by Bee Gees	undisclosed	WIN
9	Googly Eyes	"Turn Down for What" by DJ Snake and Lil Jon	David "Big Papi" Ortiz	OUT
10	Cat Witch	"Abracadabra" by Lady Gaga	undisclosed	WIN

=== Week 2 (January 14) - "Fear Night" ===
Performances on the second episode
#	Stage name	Song	Identity	Result
1	Le Who Who	"One Way or Another" by Blondie	Tiffany Haddish	OUT
2	High Voltage	"Everybody Wants to Rule the World" by Tears for Fears	undisclosed	SAFE
3	Calla Lily	"Fight Song" by Rachel Platten	undisclosed	SAFE
4	Owl	"Wild Thing" by The Troggs	undisclosed	SAFE
5	Eggplant	"Rocket Man" by Elton John	undisclosed	SAFE

=== Week 3 (January 21) - "Clueless Night" ===
Group performance: "Kids in America" by Kim Wilde

Performances on the third episode
#	Stage name	Song	Identity	Result
1	Snow Cone	"Stronger" by Britney Spears	undisclosed	SAFE
2	Scarab	"Girls Just Want to Have Fun" by Cyndi Lauper	Taraji P. Henson	OUT
3	Handyman	"Can I Kick It?" by A Tribe Called Quest	Tone Loc	OUT
4	Pugcasso	"Fake Plastic Trees" by Radiohead	undisclosed	SAFE
Wild card	Crane	"It's Not Right but It's Okay" by Whitney Houston	undisclosed	SAFE

- After being unmasked, Tone Loc performed his signature song "Wild Thing" as his encore performance.

=== Week 4 (January 28) - "Teenage Mutant Ninja Turtles Night" ===
Guest performance: Panelist Ken Jeong performs the theme from Teenage Mutant Ninja Turtles (1987)

Performances on the fourth episode
#	Stage name	Song	Identity	Result
1	Cat Witch	"Teenage Dream" by Katy Perry	undisclosed	SAFE
2	Stingray	"Momma Song" by Benson Boone	undisclosed	SAFE
3	Galaxy Girl	"Just a Girl" by No Doubt	undisclosed	SAFE
4	Queen Corgi	"Unstoppable" by Sia	Claudia Oshry	WD
Wild card	14 Karat Carrot	"Hold On, I'm Comin'" by Sam & Dave	undisclosed	SAFE

=== Week 5 (February 4) - "Red, White & Clue" ===
Guest performance: Panelist Robin Thicke performs "Living in America" by James Brown

Performances on the fifth episode
#	Stage name	Song	Identity	Result
1	High Voltage	"Miles on It" by Kane Brown and Marshmello	undisclosed	SAFE
2	Calla Lily	"Jack & Diane" by John Mellencamp	Teddi Mellencamp	OUT
3	Eggplant	"American Woman" by Lenny Kravitz	undisclosed	SAFE
4	Owl	"Ain't No Sunshine" by Bill Withers	undisclosed	SAFE
Wild card	Pangolin	"Ironic" by Alanis Morissette	undisclosed	SAFE

=== Week 6 (February 11) - "Twilight Night" ===
Guest performance: Christina Perri performs "A Thousand Years"

Performances on the sixth episode
#	Stage name	Song	Result	
1	Cat Witch	"It Will Rain" by Bruno Mars	SAFE	
2	14 Karat Carrot	"Tainted Love" by Gloria Jones	SAFE	
3	Stingray	"Bad Habits" by Ed Sheeran	RISK	
4	Owl	"White Wedding" by Billy Idol	RISK	
Vampire Royale			Identity	Result
5	Stingray	"Love Is a Battlefield" by Pat Benatar	undisclosed	SAFE
5	Owl	"Love Is a Battlefield" by Pat Benatar	Billy Ray Cyrus	OUT

- After being unmasked, Cyrus performed his signature song "Achy Breaky Heart" as his encore performance.

=== Week 7 (February 25) - "Spice Girls Night" ===
Group performance: "Spice Up Your Life" by Spice Girls with panelists Rita Ora and Jenny McCarthy Wahlberg

Performances on the seventh episode
#	Stage name	Spice Girls song	Result	
1	Crane	"Say You'll Be There"	RISK	
2	Pugcasso	"Too Much"	SAFE	
3	Snow Cone	"Wannabe"	RISK	
Spice Royale			Identity	Result
4	Crane	"Stop"	undisclosed	SAFE
4	Snow Cone	"Stop"	Heidi Montag	OUT

=== Week 8 (March 4) - "Ozzfest Night" ===
Group performance: "Crazy Train" by Ozzy Osbourne

Performances on the eighth episode
#	Stage name	Song	Result	
1	High Voltage	"Paranoid" by Black Sabbath	RISK	
2	Galaxy Girl	"Drive" by Incubus	SAFE	
3	Eggplant	"One Step Closer" by Linkin Park	RISK	
4	Pangolin	"Mama, I'm Coming Home" by Ozzy Osbourne	SAFE	
Ozzfest Royale			Identity	Result
5	Eggplant	"Iron Man" by Black Sabbath	Jack Wagner	OUT
5	High Voltage	"Iron Man" by Black Sabbath	undisclosed	SAFE

=== Week 9 (March 11) - "Care Bears Night" ===
Group performance: "Walking on Sunshine" by Katrina & the Waves

Performances on the ninth episode
#	Stage name	Song	Result	
1	Pangolin	"What a Feeling (Flashdance)" by Irene Cara	RISK	
2	High Voltage	"Bad Day" by Daniel Powter	RISK	
3	Pugcasso	"Dreams" by The Cranberries	SAFE	
4	Crane	"Good Luck, Babe!" by Chappell Roan	SAFE	
Care Bears Royale			Identity	Result
5	High Voltage	"I'm So Excited" by The Pointer Sisters	Alexi Lalas	OUT
5	Pangolin	"I'm So Excited" by The Pointer Sisters	undisclosed	SAFE

=== Week 10 (March 18) - "Star Trek Night" ===
Performances on the tenth episode
#	Stage name	Song	Identity	Result
1	Stingray	"Starboy" by The Weeknd	Evan Ross	OUT
2	Cat Witch	"Starships" by Nicki Minaj	undisclosed	SAFE
3	14 Karat Carrot	"Shining Star" by Earth, Wind & Fire	Judge Greg Mathis	OUT
4	Galaxy Girl	"Lights" by Ellie Goulding	undisclosed	SAFE

=== Week 11 (March 25) - "Semi-Finals" ===
Performances on the eleventh episode
#	Stage name	Song	Identity	Result
1	Galaxy Girl	"Misery Business" by Paramore	undisclosed	SAFE
2	Pangolin	"It Must Have Been Love" by Roxette	Rachel Platten	OUT
3	Crane	"Break Free" by Ariana Grande	undisclosed	SAFE
4	Pugcasso	"Bad Dreams" by Teddy Swims	undisclosed	SAFE
5	Cat Witch	"Run to You" by Whitney Houston	undisclosed	SAFE

- After being unmasked, Platten performed her signature song "Fight Song" as her encore performance.

=== Week 12 (April 1) - "Finale" ===
Group performance: "Mystical Magical" by Benson Boone with panelist Ken Jeong

Performances on the twelfth episode
#	Stage name	Song	Identity	Result
Round 1
1	Galaxy Girl	"Good 4 U" by Olivia Rodrigo	undisclosed	SAFE
2	Cat Witch	"Leave (Get Out)" by JoJo	undisclosed	SAFE
3	Pugcasso	"True Colors" by Cyndi Lauper	undisclosed	SAFE
4	Crane	"Together Again" by Janet Jackson	Normani	FOURTH PLACE
Round 2
5	Galaxy Girl	"Try" by P!nk	Ashlee Simpson	WINNER
6	Cat Witch	"Greedy" by Tate McRae	Kylie Cantrall	THIRD PLACE
7	Pugcasso	"Sussudio" by Phil Collins	Phillip Phillips	RUNNER-UP

- All four finalists performed their own signature songs as an encore after being unmasked; Normani (along with Khalid) performed "Love Lies", Cantrall performed "Denim", Phillips performed "Home", and Simpson performed "Pieces of Me".

== Ratings ==
Viewership and ratings per episode of The Masked Singer (American TV series) season 14
No.	Title	Air date	Rating/share (18–49)	Viewers (millions)	Ref.
1	"Premiere"	January 7, 2026	0.3/5	2.63	
2	"Fear Night"	January 14, 2026	0.3	2.68	
3	"Clueless Night"	January 21, 2026	0.3/5	2.70	
4	"Teenage Mutant Ninja Turtles Night"	January 28, 2026	0.3/5	2.72	
5	"Red, White and Clue Celebration of America's 250th Birthday"	February 4, 2026	0.2/3	1.85	
6	"Twilight Night"	February 11, 2026	0.3/4	2.60	
7	"Spice Girls Night"	February 25, 2026	0.2/3	2.47	
8	"Ozzfest Night"	March 4, 2026	0.3/4	2.61	
9	"Care Bears Night"	March 11, 2026	0.3/3	2.42	
10	"Star Trek Night"	March 18, 2026	0.3/4	2.65	
11	"Semi-Finals"	March 25, 2026	0.3/4	2.63	
12	"Finale"	April 1, 2026	0.3/4	2.57	
