= American Heart World Tour =

2025 concert tour by Benson Boone

- Tour by Benson Boone
- Promotional poster
- Location: Europe; North America
- Associated album: American Heart
- Start date: August 22, 2025
- End date: March 15, 2026
- Legs: 2
- No. of shows: 50
- Supporting acts: Elliot James Reay; Brooke Combe
- Website: bensonboone.com

Benson Boone concert chronology
- Fireworks & Rollerblades World Tour (2024–2025); American Heart World Tour (2025–2026); Wanted Man Tour (2026)

The American Heart World Tour was the third concert tour by American singer-songwriter Benson Boone, in support of his second studio album, American Heart (2025). It began in Saint Paul, Minnesota, United States, on August 22, 2025, and concluded in Birmingham, England, on March 15, 2026. Spanning 50 shows across North America and Europe, it marked Boone's first all-arena concert tour.

== Announcements ==
On May 5, 2025, Benson Boone announced that he would embark on the American Heart World Tour with thirty dates across North America, marking his first all-arena concert tour. The pre-sale and general sale dates were announced concurrently. Pre-sales started on May 7, while general sales began on May 9. On May 8, Boone announced two extra dates for Salt Lake City due to high demand. On May 30, Boone announced the European leg of the tour. Pre-sales began on June 3, while general sales started on June 5. On June 4, Boone announced extra dates for Manchester and Amsterdam due to high demand. A day later, an extra date for London was also announced. On August 19, Elliot James Reay was announced as the opening act for the first half of the North American leg of the tour, and on September 15, Brooke Combe was announced as the opener for the remainder of the North American leg. On October 10, Reay was announced to return as the opening act for the tour's European leg. On November 1, the Birmingham show was cancelled at the last minute due to vocal issues.

== Set list ==
This set list is from the concert in Saint Paul, Minnesota, United States, on August 22, 2025.

1. "I Wanna Be the One You Call"
2. "Wanted Man"
3. "Sorry I'm Here for Someone Else"
4. "Man in Me"
5. "Drunk in My Mind"
6. "Slow It Down"
7. "Be Someone"
8. "Mystical Magical"
9. "Pretty Slowly"
10. "In the Stars"
11. "Let Me Go"
12. "There She Goes"
13. "Sugar Sweet"
14. "Take Me Home"
15. "Young American Heart"
16. "Mr Electric Blue"
17. Surprise Cover (Varies each night)
18. "Momma Song"
19. "Love of Mine"
20. "Reminds Me of You"
21. "Beautiful Things"
22. "Cry" (encore)

== Tour dates ==
List of 2025 concerts
Date (2025)	City	Country	Venue	Supporting act(s)
August 22	Saint Paul	United States	Xcel Energy Center	Elliot James Reay
August 23	Chicago	United States	United Center	Elliot James Reay
August 25	Columbus	United States	Nationwide Arena	Elliot James Reay
August 26	Cleveland	United States	Rocket Arena	Elliot James Reay
August 27	Detroit	United States	Little Caesars Arena	Elliot James Reay
August 29	Toronto	Canada	Scotiabank Arena	Elliot James Reay
August 30	Montreal	Canada	Bell Centre	Elliot James Reay
September 2	Boston	United States	TD Garden	Elliot James Reay
September 3	Philadelphia	United States	Xfinity Mobile Arena	Elliot James Reay
September 5	New York City	United States	Madison Square Garden	Elliot James Reay
September 6	Baltimore	United States	CFG Bank Arena	Elliot James Reay
September 7	Raleigh	United States	Lenovo Center	Elliot James Reay
September 9	Nashville	United States	Bridgestone Arena	Elliot James Reay
September 10	Atlanta	United States	State Farm Arena	Elliot James Reay
September 13	Tampa	United States	Benchmark International Arena	Elliot James Reay
September 14	Miami	United States	Kaseya Center	Elliot James Reay
September 16	Orlando	United States	Kia Center	Elliot James Reay
September 18	Houston	United States	Toyota Center	Brooke Combe
September 19	Austin	United States	Moody Center	Brooke Combe
September 20	Fort Worth	United States	Dickies Arena	Brooke Combe
September 22	Denver	United States	Ball Arena	Brooke Combe
September 24	Glendale	United States	Desert Diamond Arena	Brooke Combe
September 26	Paradise (Note: Labeled as Las Vegas in promotional material.)	United States	T-Mobile Arena	Brooke Combe
September 27	San Diego	United States	Pechanga Arena	Brooke Combe
September 28	Anaheim	United States	Honda Center	Brooke Combe
September 30	Los Angeles	United States	Crypto.com Arena	Brooke Combe
October 1	San Francisco	United States	Chase Center	Brooke Combe
October 3	Portland	United States	Moda Center	Brooke Combe
October 4	Vancouver	Canada	Rogers Arena	Brooke Combe
October 5	Seattle	United States	Climate Pledge Arena	Brooke Combe
October 8	Salt Lake City	United States	Delta Center	Brooke Combe
October 9	Salt Lake City	United States	Delta Center	Brooke Combe
October 11	Salt Lake City	United States	Delta Center	Brooke Combe
October 23	Belfast	Northern Ireland	SSE Arena	Elliot James Reay
October 24	Dublin	Ireland	3Arena	Elliot James Reay
October 26	Manchester	England	Co-op Live	Elliot James Reay
October 27	Manchester	England	Co-op Live	Elliot James Reay
October 30	Glasgow	Scotland	OVO Hydro	Elliot James Reay
November 3	London	England	The O2 Arena	Elliot James Reay
November 4	London	England	The O2 Arena	Elliot James Reay
November 5	London	England	The O2 Arena	Elliot James Reay
November 7	Cologne	Germany	Lanxess Arena	Elliot James Reay
November 8	Antwerp	Belgium	AFAS Dome	Elliot James Reay
November 10	Amsterdam	Netherlands	Ziggo Dome	Elliot James Reay
November 11	Amsterdam	Netherlands	Ziggo Dome	Elliot James Reay
November 13	Paris	France	Accor Arena	Elliot James Reay
November 15	Copenhagen	Denmark	Royal Arena	Elliot James Reay
November 17	Fornebu (Note: Labeled as Oslo in promotional material.)	Norway	Unity Arena	Elliot James Reay
November 18	Stockholm	Sweden	Avicii Arena	Elliot James Reay

List of 2026 concerts
Date (2026)	City	Country	Venue	Supporting act(s)
March 15 (Note: Rescheduled from November 1, 2025 due to vocal issues)	Birmingham	England	Utilita Arena	Victor Ray
