= Adrenalin (band) =

- Origin: East Detroit, Michigan, U.S.
- Genres: Rock, arena rock
- Years active: 1977-1988, 2002

Adrenalin was an American rock band from East Detroit, Michigan, United States, best known for their song "Road of the Gypsy," featured in the 1986 film Iron Eagle.

Adrenalin was made up of six friends from elementary school (St. Veronica) to high school (Grosse Pointe North). Brian and Mark Pastoria, Jimmy and Mike Romeo, Bruce Schafer and Mike "Flash" Haggerty started the band in the mid-1970s with the help of lead singer David Larson.

By the end of Adrenalin's run as a band, the members had coped with the suicide of their original lead singer, David Larson. They were dropped by PolyGram in 1987.

The Pastoria and Romeo brothers formed a new band titled DC Drive. With the addition of Doug Kahan on bass and Joey Bowen on vocals, DC Drive essentially replaced Adrenalin.

Soon after the forming of DC Drive they received a recording deal from Capitol Records/EMI of Canada and began working with Vini Poncia. The result was a self-titled album described by themselves as "rock and soul".

The album and the single "You Need Love" were a success across Detroit and in Canada. In 1993, DC Drive and PR Music garnered many awards and much recognition, including seven nominations and four awards including Best Rock Group and Best Single ("You Need Love") at the Motor City Music Awards. DC Drive disbanded in 1993, when Joey quit to make solo music and Doug went to Nashville.

Adrenalin re-united for a show at the Royal Oak Music Theatre on May 25, 2002 with singer Graham Strachan fronting the band.

In June 2015, Adrenalin was inducted into the Michigan Rock n Roll Legends Hall of Fame.

== Lineup ==
Over the years the band's lineup consisted of:

- David Larson - Vocals (1977–80)
- Marc Gilbert - Vocals (1980–86)
- Joey Bowen - Vocals (1991 - 1993)
- Michael Romeo - Guitar (1977–Present)
- Brian Pastoria - Drums (1977–Present)
- Mark Pastoria - Keyboards (1981–Present)
- Jimmy Romeo - Sax (1979–Present)
- Michael "Flash" Haggerty - Guitar (1977–Present)
- Bruce Schafer - Bass (1978–Present)
- Glen Young - Bass (1977–78)
- Graham Strachan - Vocals (2002)
- Bill Buda - Keyboards (1977)

The band's current lineup is: Brian Pastoria, (drums); Bruce Schafer, (bass); James Romeo, (saxophone); Mark Pastoria, (keyboards); Michael Haggerty, (guitar); Michael Romeo, (guitar). They currently record at Harmonie Park in Detroit, MI.

== Discography ==
=== Studio albums ===
Title	Album details	Chart positions	
Title	Album details	US	US Rock
Don't Be Lookin' Back	Released: 1983; Label: Musical Signature Records; Formats: LP, CS	-	-
American Heart	Released: 1984; Label: Rocshire Records; Formats: LP, CS	203	29
Road Of The Gypsy	Released: 1986; Label: MCA Records; Formats: LP, CD, CS	-	-

=== Singles ===
List of singles, with selected chart positions and certifications, showing year released and album name
Title	Year	Peak chart positions	Album
Title	Year	US Main. Rock	Album
"Cumz 'N' Goes / Rock 'N' Roll Screamer"	1977	—	Single only
"Gimme Good Lovin' / Change Of Heart"	1980	—	Single only
"I Don't Know When To Quit / Everything Is Gonna Be Alright"	1981	—	Single only
"Faraway Eyes"	1984	28	American Heart
"Road Of The Gypsy"	1986	—	Road Of The Gypsy
"Northern Shores"	1986	—	Road Of The Gypsy
"—" denotes a recording that did not chart or was not released in that territory.

== Awards ==
- Best Song (Pop/Rock) - Detroit Music Awards (1993) - Joey Bowen vocals on "You Need Love" and "All I Want"
- Best Pop Rock Act (Pop/Rock) - Detroit Music Awards (1993)
- Best Record Company/ Harmonie Park - Detroit Music Awards (2002)
- Best Compilation / Christmas in Detroit - Detroit Music Awards (1993)
- Best Studio - Detroit Music Awards (2000)
