= The Time of My Life (Benson Boone song) =

2026 single by Benson Boone

Single by Benson Boone
- Released: June 25, 2026
- Length: 3:35
- Label: Night Street; Warner

Benson Boone singles chronology
"Man in Me" (2026)	"The Time of My Life" (2026)

Audio sample
- file; help

Music video
- "The Time of My Life" on YouTube

"The Time of My Life" is a 2026 song by Benson Boone, released on June 25, 2026, Boone's 24th birthday.

It gathered 1,298,574 streams on its first full tracking day.

== Music video ==
Alix Earle appears in the music video.

== Charts ==
=== Weekly charts ===
Weekly chart performance
Chart (2026)	Peak position
Canada Hot 100 (Billboard)	74
Canada AC (Billboard)	24
Canada CHR/Top 40 (Billboard)	30
Canada Hot AC (Billboard)	24
Croatia International Airplay (Top lista)	89
Czech Republic Airplay (ČNS IFPI)	32
Estonia Airplay (TopHit)	157
Global 200 (Billboard)	193
Guatemala Anglo Airplay (Monitor Latino)	14
Ireland (IRMA)	98
Israel International TV Airplay (Media Forest)	4
Lithuania Airplay (TopHit)	16
New Zealand Hot Singles (RMNZ)	3
Portugal Airplay (AFP)	37
Slovakia Airplay (ČNS IFPI)	34
UK Singles (Official Charts)	75
US Billboard Hot 100	60
US Adult Contemporary (Billboard)	20
US Adult Pop Airplay (Billboard)	12
US Pop Airplay (Billboard)	17

=== Monthly charts ===
Monthly chart performance
Chart (2026)	Peak position
Lithuania Airplay (TopHit)	21

== Release history ==
Release dates and formats for "The Time of My Life"
Region	Date	Format	Label(s)	Ref.
Various	June 25, 2026	Digital download; streaming	Night Street; Warner	
Italy	June 26, 2026	Radio airplay	Warner	
United States	June 30, 2026	Contemporary hit radio	Night Street; Warner	
Various	August 28, 2026	7" Vinyl	Night Street; Warner	
