= Mr Electric Blue =

2025 single by Benson Boone

Single by Benson Boone

from the album American Heart
- Released: September 26, 2025
- Genre: Rock
- Length: 3:10
- Label: Night Street; Warner
- Songwriters: Benson Boone; Evan Blair; Jack LaFrantz
- Producer: Evan Blair

Benson Boone singles chronology
"Momma Song" (2025)	"Mr Electric Blue" (2025)	"Man in Me" (2026)

Music video
- "Mr Electric Blue" on YouTube

"Mr Electric Blue" is a song by the American singer Benson Boone from his second studio album, American Heart (2025). He wrote the song with his frequent collaborator Jack Lafrantz and its producer, Evan Blair. "Mr Electric Blue" is a tribute to Boone's father. It is the second track on the album, which was released on June 20, 2025, by Night Street and Warner Records. A music video directed by Matt Eastin premiered on the same date; it addresses public criticism of Boone, including one-hit wonder and industry plant allegations. It was sent to Italian radio stations as the album's fourth single on September 26, 2025, ahead of the European leg of the album's supporting world tour.

== Release and composition ==
Night Street and Warner Records released American Heart as Benson Boone's second studio album on June 20, 2025, including "Mr Electric Blue" as its second track. Boone wrote "Mr Electric Blue" with Jack Lafrantz and Evan Blair; the latter served as the song's producer and audio engineer, and played several instruments including bass, guitar, keyboards, and drums. Dale Becker was the mastering engineer, accompanied by Katie Harvey and Noah McCorkle as assistants, while Alex Ghenea was in charge of the mixing. It has a duration of three minutes and ten seconds. Writing for Vulture, the critic Jason P. Frank categorized "Mr Electric Blue" as a "third-person rock song about rad folks", and paired it with "Bennie and the Jets" (1974) by Elton John, "Ziggy Stardust" (1972) by David Bowie, and "Pinball Wizard" (1969) by the Who. In the lyrics, Boone shares his admiration to his father, worshipping him as a hero: "A good hardworking American / But he ain't the guy you want to fight". Music publications noted similarities with the works of the English rock band Electric Light Orchestra.

== Music video ==
A music video for "Mr Electric Blue", directed by Matt Eastin, premiered on June 20, 2025, in parallel to American Heart. Starring Boone as himself, the video addresses criticism from the public directed to him after the commercial success of the single "Beautiful Things" (2024). The video begins with him wearing a "one-hit wonder" shirt and meeting an agent from a fictional record label named "Industry Plant Records"—referencing the allegations of the singer being an industry plant—to which he owes US$ 10 million. The agent—played by the song's co-writer and the singer's frequent collaborator Jack LaFrantz—tells Boone that he is failing and they need "good songwriting", to what the singer responds, "You know I can't do that." He attempts to earn the money doing several jobs, including selling used jumpsuits and mowing lawn for a company called "Auto-Tune Trimmers". After meeting a girl who believes his music is terrible, Boone earns $168 and asks the agent for another chance. They tell him that his music was sold to chain stores and fast-food restaurants, achieving his goal of being "the most overplayed artist in the world".

== Critical reception ==
For Billboard, Andrew Unterberger ranked "Mr Electric Blue" as the eighth best track on American Heart. The critic described it as unclear and confusing, and interpreted its title character as an "odd mix" of Ziggy Stardust, "Bad, Bad Leroy Brown", and "Mr. Blue Sky". He also criticized its video as "fun-but-overstuffed". In negative reviews of American Heart, Rolling Stone's Brittany Spanos and Pitchfork's Jeremy D. Larson considered "Mr Electric Blue" one of the few good moments on the album; the former highlighted the "earnest tribute" to Boone's father. Jonah Krueger from Consequence wrote that the song's chorus is nonsensical.

== Charts ==
=== Weekly charts ===
Weekly chart performance
Chart (2025–2026)	Peak position
Argentina Anglo Airplay (Monitor Latino)	12
Belgium (Ultratop 50 Flanders)	25
Belgium (Ultratop 50 Wallonia)	18
Canada Hot 100 (Billboard)	64
Canada CHR/Top 40 (Billboard)	19
Canada Hot AC (Billboard)	22
Central America Anglo Airplay (Monitor Latino)	11
Chile Anglo Airplay (Monitor Latino)	11
Colombia Anglo Airplay (Monitor Latino)	13
Costa Rica Anglo Airplay (Monitor Latino)	15
Croatia International Airplay (Top lista)	53
Czech Republic Airplay (ČNS IFPI)	8
Ecuador Anglo Airplay (Monitor Latino)	11
Estonia Airplay (TopHit)	39
Global 200 (Billboard)	125
Guatemala Anglo Airplay (Monitor Latino)	10
Ireland (IRMA)	79
Italy Airplay (EarOne)	23
Japan Hot Overseas (Billboard Japan)	12
Lithuania Airplay (TopHit)	170
Malta Airplay (Radiomonitor)	9
New Zealand Hot Singles (RMNZ)	9
Nicaragua Anglo Airplay (Monitor Latino)	5
North Macedonia Airplay (Radiomonitor)	19
Panama Anglo Airplay (Monitor Latino)	5
Poland (Polish Airplay Top 100)	25
Portugal Airplay (AFP)	19
Romania Airplay (TopHit)	179
Slovakia Airplay (ČNS IFPI)	58
UK Singles (Official Charts)	55
US Billboard Hot 100	73
US Adult Contemporary (Billboard)	21
US Adult Pop Airplay (Billboard)	13
US Pop Airplay (Billboard)	16

=== Monthly charts ===
Monthly chart performance
Chart (2026)	Peak position
Estonia Airplay (TopHit)	45

== Release history ==
Release dates and formats
Region	Date	Format	Label	Ref.
Italy	September 26, 2025	Contemporary hit radio	Warner	
United States	November 11, 2025	Contemporary hit radio	Night Street; Warner	
