= Heart of America =

Heart of America may refer to:

- Heart of America (film), a 2002 Canadian-German drama film
- "Heart of America" (song), a charity single
- Heart of America (college rugby), a college rugby conference
- Heart of America (yacht), 12-metre class yacht
- Heart of America (album), an album by Ryan Upchurch
- Heart of America Council, a BSA council
- Kansas, the central most US state
