= American Heart (Adrenalin album) =

Studio album by Adrenalin
- Released: 1984
- Genre: Rock
- Label: Rocshire Records
- Producer: Vini Poncia

Adrenalin chronology
Don't Be Lookin' Back... (1983)	American Heart (1984)	Road of the Gypsy (1986)

American Heart is a studio album by American rock band Adrenalin. It was released in 1984 by Rocshire Records. The only single was "Faraway Eyes" (#28 in the U.S. Rock Tracks).

== Track listing ==
A Side

No.	Title	Length
1.	"Faraway Eyes"
2.	"Broken Hearted Bound"
3.	"Northern Shores"
4.	"Photograph (Time Passes On)"
5.	"The Kid's Got a Will to Live"

B Side

No.	Title	Length
1.	"Baby I'm Back"
2.	"Gimme Your Heart"
3.	"The Pressure's On"
4.	"Michael"
5.	"Freedom Road"

== Charts ==
=== Album ===
Chart (1984)	Peak position
US Bubbling Under the Top LPs (Billboard)	203
US Rock Albums (Billboard)	29

=== Singles ===
Year	Single	Chart	Position
1984	"Faraway Eyes"	Billboard Top Rock Tracks	28
