= Sorry I'm Here for Someone Else =

2025 single by Benson Boone

Single by Benson Boone

from the album American Heart
- Released: February 27, 2025
- Recorded: December 22, 2024
- Genre: Pop rock; synth-pop
- Length: 2:36
- Label: Night Street; Warner
- Songwriters: Benson Boone; Jack LaFrantz; Jason Evigan
- Producer: Evigan

Benson Boone singles chronology
"Pretty Slowly" (2024)	"Sorry I'm Here for Someone Else" (2025)	"Mystical Magical" (2025)

Lyric video
- "Sorry I'm Here For Someone Else" on YouTube

"Sorry I'm Here for Someone Else" is a song by American singer-songwriter Benson Boone. It was released on February 27, 2025, as the lead single from his second studio album, American Heart. It has received a nomination for Song of the Year at the upcoming 2026 iHeartRadio Music Awards.

== Composition ==
"Sorry I'm Here for Someone Else" is a pop rock song. It features pulsating synths and a drum loop of driving rhythm. Lyrically, the song revolves around moving on from a relationship and bearing no ill will toward one's past love, as Benson Boone describes an encounter with his old lover while waiting for his current partner at a diner and being forced to apologize. He is hesitant to break his lover's heart, but explains "It's not personal". The song is written in the key of D Major.

== Critical reception ==
Danielle Holian of Atwood Magazine gave a positive review, praising the lyricism; "Boone's lyrical simplicity is its greatest strength here – he doesn't overcomplicate the narrative, but instead speaks directly to the heart of anyone who's experienced the awkwardness of seeing an ex when you're no longer on the same page", production; "The blend of electronic elements with traditional instrumentation lends itself to a sound that feels both modern and timeless, a delicate balance that speaks to Boone's versatility as an artist", and the song's "ability to be both personal and universally relatable." The track has received a nomination for Song of the Year at the upcoming 2026 iHeartRadio Music Awards.

== Charts ==
=== Weekly charts ===
Weekly chart performance
Chart (2025–2026)	Peak position
Argentina Anglo Airplay (Monitor Latino)	4
Australia (ARIA)	34
Austria (Ö3 Austria Top 40)	51
Belarus Airplay (TopHit)	2
Belgium (Ultratop 50 Flanders)	9
Belgium (Ultratop 50 Wallonia)	13
Canada Hot 100 (Billboard)	8
Canada AC (Billboard)	2
Canada CHR/Top 40 (Billboard)	2
Canada Hot AC (Billboard)	2
Canada Modern Rock (Billboard)	39
Chile Anglo Airplay (Monitor Latino)	5
Colombia Anglo Airplay (Monitor Latino)	2
Colombia Anglo Airplay (National-Report)	2
CIS Airplay (TopHit)	5
Costa Rica Anglo Airplay (Monitor Latino)	9
Croatia International Airplay (Top lista)	6
Czech Republic Airplay (ČNS IFPI)	3
Denmark Airplay (Tracklisten)	7
Dominican Republic Anglo Airplay (Monitor Latino)	5
Ecuador Anglo Airplay (Monitor Latino)	3
Estonia Airplay (TopHit)	2
Finland Airplay (Radiosoittolista)	18
France (SNEP)	152
Germany (GfK)	45
Global 200 (Billboard)	53
Greece Airplay (IFPI)	18
Guatemala Anglo Airplay (Monitor Latino)	3
Hungary (Editors' Choice Top 40)	8
Iceland (Tónlistinn)	17
Ireland (IRMA)	17
Kazakhstan Airplay (TopHit)	3
Latvia Airplay (LaIPA)	3
Lebanon English (Lebanese Top 20)	11
Lithuania Airplay (TopHit)	7
Mexico Anglo Airplay (Monitor Latino)	7
Moldova Airplay (TopHit)	121
Netherlands (Dutch Top 40)	17
Netherlands (Single Top 100)	32
New Zealand (Recorded Music NZ)	28
North Macedonia Airplay (Radiomonitor)	3
Norway (VG-lista)	24
Paraguay Anglo Airplay (Monitor Latino)	5
Peru Anglo Airplay (Monitor Latino)	7
Poland (Polish Airplay Top 100)	8
Portugal (AFP)	118
Puerto Rico Anglo Airplay (Monitor Latino)	2
Romania Airplay (TopHit)	42
Russia Airplay (TopHit)	11
San Marino Airplay (SMRTV Top 50)	9
Serbia Airplay (Radiomonitor)	14
Slovakia Airplay (ČNS IFPI)	1
Slovenia Airplay (Radiomonitor)	9
Sweden (Sverigetopplistan)	66
Switzerland (Schweizer Hitparade)	49
Switzerland Airplay (IFPI)	2
Ukraine Airplay (TopHit)	21
UK Singles (Official Charts)	20
US Billboard Hot 100	19
US Adult Contemporary (Billboard)	8
US Adult Pop Airplay (Billboard)	2
US Pop Airplay (Billboard)	2
Venezuela Airplay (Record Report)	19

=== Monthly charts ===
Monthly chart performance
Chart (2025)	Position
Belarus Airplay (TopHit)	5
CIS Airplay (TopHit)	6
Estonia Airplay (TopHit)	4
Kazakhstan Airplay (TopHit)	6
Lithuania Airplay (TopHit)	15
Romania Airplay (TopHit)	62
Russia Airplay (TopHit)	9
Ukraine Airplay (TopHit)	31

=== Year-end charts ===
Year-end chart performance
Chart (2025)	Position
Argentina Anglo Airplay (Monitor Latino)	46
Australia (ARIA)	79
Belarus Airplay (TopHit)	21
Belgium (Ultratop 50 Flanders)	37
Belgium (Ultratop 50 Wallonia)	46
Canada (Canadian Hot 100)	24
Canada AC (Billboard)	14
Canada CHR/Top 40 (Billboard)	11
Canada Hot AC (Billboard)	8
CIS Airplay (TopHit)	9
Estonia Airplay (TopHit)	5
Germany (GfK)	78
Global 200 (Billboard)	172
Iceland (Tónlistinn)	53
Kazakhstan Airplay (TopHit)	17
Lithuania Airplay (TopHit)	93
Netherlands (Dutch Top 40)	54
Poland (Polish Airplay Top 100)	51
Russia Airplay (TopHit)	15
UK Singles (OCC)	98
US Billboard Hot 100	37
US Adult Contemporary (Billboard)	15
US Adult Pop Airplay (Billboard)	8
US Pop Airplay (Billboard)	7

== Certifications ==
Certifications for "Sorry I'm Here for Someone Else"
Region	Certification	Certified units/sales
Australia (ARIA)	Platinum	70,000^{‡}
Austria (IFPI Austria)	Gold	15,000^{‡}
Canada (Music Canada)	2× Platinum	160,000^{‡}
France (SNEP)	Gold	100,000^{‡}
Netherlands (NVPI)	Gold	46,500^{‡}
New Zealand (RMNZ)	Platinum	30,000^{‡}
Portugal (AFP)	Gold	12,000^{‡}
Spain (Promusicae)	Gold	50,000^{‡}
United Kingdom (BPI)	Platinum	600,000^{‡}
^{‡} Sales+streaming figures based on certification alone.

== Release history ==
Release dates and formats for "Sorry I'm Here for Someone Else"
Region	Date	Format	Label(s)	Ref.
United States	March 4, 2025	Contemporary hit radio	Night Street; Warner	
