= American Heart (Benson Boone album) =

Studio album by Benson Boone
- Released: June 20, 2025
- Recorded: 2024 – March 2025
- Genre: Pop rock
- Length: 30:27
- Labels: Night Street; Warner
- Producers: Jason Evigan; Jason Suwito; Malay; Evan Blair

Benson Boone chronology
Fireworks & Rollerblades (2024)	American Heart (2025)

Singles from American Heart
- 1. "Sorry I'm Here for Someone Else" Released: February 27, 2025; 2. "Mystical Magical" Released: April 24, 2025; 3. "Momma Song" Released: May 22, 2025; 4. "Mr Electric Blue" Released: September 26, 2025; 5. "Man in Me" Released: January 2, 2026

American Heart is the second studio album by American singer-songwriter Benson Boone, released on June 20, 2025, through Night Street and Warner Records. It was preceded by the release of the singles "Sorry I'm Here for Someone Else", "Mystical Magical", and "Momma Song". A music video for "Mr Electric Blue" premiered along with the album, and was later promoted as its fourth single. To support the album, Boone embarked on the American Heart World Tour, from August 2025 to March 2026, and on the Wanted Man Tour, from July to September 2026.

The album received mixed reviews from music critics; some praised Boone's vocal performance and the album's overall sound, while other felt that it was rushed and formulaic. Commercially, American Heart topped the charts in Australia and New Zealand. It debuted at number two on the US Billboard 200 with 61,000 album-equivalent units, becoming Boone's second top-ten album in the United States.

== Background and promotion ==
On March 11, 2025, Rolling Stone reported that Benson Boone was in the process of finishing up an album, then tentatively titled American Heart. He admitted that he was ready to move beyond his biggest song "Beautiful Things" (2024) and that he wanted to prove that there is more to him, stating that he had "never believed so much in a body of work" before. Written over the course of 17 days with Jack LaFrantz, the album was inspired by Bruce Springsteen and Americana music, with Boone intending it to have "a little more of a retro vibe". On April 11, Boone announced American Heart at the Coachella 2025 festival and performed "Young American Heart". He also revealed the album's cover artwork, which sees him standing in front of an American flag. Pitchfork's Jeremy D. Larson described it as "the movie poster for Zack Snyder's lost Bruce Springsteen biopic." To support the album, Boone embarked on the American Heart World Tour, beginning in August 2025 and concluding in November 2025. On September 26, 2025, "Mr Electric Blue" was released as a single in Italy ahead of the tour's European leg. "Man in Me" was released to an Italian radio on January 2, 2026, as the fifth single from the album.

== Production and composition ==
NME's Jordan Bassett described American Heart as "bombastic, overproduced pop-rock with an attention-seeking, theatrical bent and broad brushstroke lyrics everyone can relate to." The Washington Post's Chris Richards thought it contained "over-sung pop songs designed to flatter the world with their unyielding sense of effort, resulting in something fizzy, dizzying, occasionally fun and fundamentally shrewd."

The opening track, "Sorry I'm Here for Someone Else", is a pop rock song in which the narrator encounters an old lover while going to see another person. The second track, "Mr Electric Blue", was compared by Rolling Stone's Brian Hiatt to the music of Electric Light Orchestra and talks "about hero-worshipping his dad", while the third track, "Man in Me", features "synthier and dancier" elements about a past relationship. According to Boone, "Mystical Magical", "a quirky, Seventies-vibed pop song" that interpolates the chorus of Olivia Newton-John's "Physical" (1981), is the one he thinks would be the biggest off the album. In the sixth track, "Momma Song", Boone professes his love to his mother. The seventh track, "I Wanna Be the One You Call", originated from a "nearly abandoned" track that would meet completion through a collaboration with musician Malay. The final track, "Young American Heart", is "a surging, Killers-ish song about a near-fatal car accident" that Boone got into with his best friend as teenagers.

== Critical reception ==
Professional ratings
Aggregate scores
Source	Rating
Metacritic	47/100
Review scores
Source	Rating
AllMusic	3/5 stars
The Arts Desk	4/5 stars
Consequence	C−
NME	2/5 stars
Pitchfork	3.7/10
Riff Magazine	7/10
Rolling Stone	2/5 stars
Slant Magazine	3/5 stars
Stereoboard	2/5 stars

According to the review aggregator Metacritic, American Heart received "mixed or average reviews" based on a weighted average score of 47 out of 100 from 7 critic scores. Some critics, such as Bassett and Rolling Stone's Brittany Spanos, thought that the album was rush-released as an attempt to capitalize on Boone's sudden rise to fame. Chris Willman of Variety praised Boone's vocal performance but felt that American Heart "sounds like" it was made in only 17 days, adding that "these songs play less ridiculously on record than they read on paper because Boone has the kind of phenomenal voice that can push a lot of average material into the plus category".

Some critics deemed American Heart formulaic and uninventive. Larson characterized the album as "music for people who like how music sounds, but not for people who like music." Alec Lane of Slant Magazine considered American Heart unfinished and felt that it contained several "competently performed" fillers that failed to explore Boone's artistic and personal identities. Jonah Krueger of Consequence believed that Boone was pursuing "the dragon of 'Beautiful Things'" on the album with generic TikTok-friendly songwriting that felt disingenuous. Spanos thought that American Heart lacked the youthful energy and authenticity of Boone's past music, although she acknowledged that "there's a spark of charm that reels you in" throughout the album. Bassett felt that while the album was "more distinctive" than Fireworks & Rollerblades, it was a "slicker, more iPhone-friendly version of stuff that's been done more edgily in the past". Vulture's Craig Jenkins similarly remarked that Boone showcased "an endearing willingness to grow his craft but also a steely reverence to painfully obvious points of reference".

More positive reviews praised Boone's vocal performance and the album's overall sound. The Arts Desk's Katie Colombus wrote that the album "pulses with nostalgic grooves, infectious hooks, and compulsive replay." She praised Boone as a "born showman with genuine vocal chops" and stated that although he "may have built his castle on TikTok sand", his commitment to his sound on the album was captivating. Mike DeWald from Riff Magazine referred to American Heart as an "interesting work" that highlighted Boone's capabilities and had better production than Fireworks & Rollerblades, stating that Boone excelled in tracks where he showcased his own sound rather than emulating other musicians.

== Track listing ==
American Heart track listing
No.	Title	Writer(s)	Producer(s)	Length
1.	"Sorry I'm Here for Someone Else"	Benson Boone; Jack LaFrantz; Jason Evigan	Evigan	2:36
2.	"Mr Electric Blue"	Boone; LaFrantz; Evan Blair	Blair	3:10
3.	"Man in Me"	Boone; LaFrantz; Evigan	Evigan	3:48
4.	"Mystical Magical"	Boone; LaFrantz; Blair; Steve Kipner; Terry Shaddick	Blair	2:45
5.	"Reminds Me of You"	Boone; LaFrantz; Blair	Blair	2:58
6.	"Momma Song"	Boone; LaFrantz; Evigan	Evigan	3:17
7.	"I Wanna Be the One You Call"	Boone; LaFrantz; Malay	Malay	3:01
8.	"Wanted Man"	Boone; LaFrantz; Jason Suwito	Suwito	2:55
9.	"Take Me Home"	Boone; LaFrantz; Blair	Blair	3:01
10.	"Young American Heart"	Boone; LaFrantz; Blair; Evigan; Robin Weisse	Blair	2:52
Total length:				30:27

== Personnel ==
Credits adapted from Tidal.

=== Musicians ===
- Benson Boone – lead vocals (all tracks), keyboards (tracks 2, 4, 5, 9, 10), Rhodes piano (3), background vocals (7, 8); piano, synthesizer (8)
- Jason Evigan – programming (1, 3, 6); drums, guitar (1, 3); keyboards, percussion (1); synthesizer (3); bass, orchestration (6)
- Evan Blair – background vocals (2, 4, 5, 10), bass (2, 4, 5, 9, 10), drum programming (2, 4, 5, 9, 10), drums (2, 4, 5, 9, 10), guitar (2, 4, 5, 9, 10), keyboards (2, 4, 5, 9, 10)
- Jack LaFrantz – background vocals (2, 4, 5, 7, 8)
- PJ Cartwright – strings (2, 10)
- Rob Moose – strings (6)
- Malay – bass, guitar, programming, synthesizer (7)
- McKenzie Smith – drums (7)
- Jason Suwito – background vocals, bass, drums, guitar, piano, programming, synthesizer (8)

=== Technical ===
- Dale Becker – mastering
- Alex Ghenea – mixing (1, 2, 4, 5, 9, 10)
- Mitch McCarthy – mixing (3, 7, 8)
- Tom Elmhirst – mixing (6)
- Jason Evigan – engineering (1, 3, 6), vocal production (1)
- Jackson Rau – engineering (1, 3, 6)
- Evan Blair – engineering (2, 4, 5, 9, 10)
- Katie Harvey – mastering assistance
- Noah McCorkle – mastering assistance

== Charts ==
=== Weekly charts ===
Weekly chart performance for American Heart
Chart (2025)	Peak position
Australian Albums (ARIA)	1
Austrian Albums (Ö3 Austria)	7
Belgian Albums (Ultratop Flanders)	2
Belgian Albums (Ultratop Wallonia)	3
Canadian Albums (Billboard)	2
Czech Albums (ČNS IFPI)	29
Danish Albums (Hitlisten)	31
Dutch Albums (Album Top 100)	2
French Albums (SNEP)	11
German Albums (Offizielle Top 100)	5
Hungarian Albums (MAHASZ)	8
Icelandic Albums (Tónlistinn)	39
Irish Albums (Official Charts)	12
Italian Albums (FIMI)	48
Japanese Western Albums (Oricon)	25
Lithuanian Albums (AGATA)	32
New Zealand Albums (RMNZ)	1
Norwegian Albums (IFPI Norge)	7
Polish Albums (ZPAV)	16
Portuguese Albums (AFP)	8
Scottish Albums (Official Charts)	3
Slovak Albums (ČNS IFPI)	30
Spanish Albums (Promusicae)	25
Swedish Albums (Sverigetopplistan)	38
Swiss Albums (Schweizer Hitparade)	6
UK Albums (Official Charts)	4
US Billboard 200	2

=== Year-end charts ===
Year-end chart performance for American Heart
Chart (2025)	Position
Belgian Albums (Ultratop Flanders)	122
Belgian Albums (Ultratop Wallonia)	156
Dutch Albums (Album Top 100)	71
French Albums (SNEP)	174
US Billboard 200	179

== Certifications ==
Certifications for American Heart
Region	Certification	Certified units/sales
Canada (Music Canada)	Gold	40,000^{‡}
New Zealand (RMNZ)	Gold	7,500^{‡}
United Kingdom (BPI)	Silver	60,000^{‡}
United States (RIAA)	Gold	500,000^{‡}
^{‡} Sales+streaming figures based on certification alone.
