= Momma Song =

2025 single by Benson Boone

Single by Benson Boone

from the album American Heart
- Released: May 22, 2025
- Genre: Pop rock
- Length: 3:17
- Label: Night Street; Warner
- Songwriters: Benson Boone; Jack LaFrantz; Jason Evigan
- Producer: Evigan

Benson Boone singles chronology
| "Mystical Magical" (2025) | "Momma Song" (2025) | "Mr Electric Blue" (2025) |

Music video
- "Momma Song" on YouTube

"Momma Song" is a song by American singer Benson Boone, released on May 22, 2025, as the third single from his second studio album, American Heart (2025). It was written by Boone himself, Jack LaFrantz and Jason Evigan, who also produced the song.

== Background ==
At the Sips & Sounds music festival, Benson Boone said:

There's a song on the album, it is called "The Momma Song". This is like the "In the Stars" of this next album. This is the one that, if you are having a rough one, having a tough one, you go in your car and you listen to this one. I know that not everybody is lucky enough to, one, have their parents around, but, two, have parents that support them in what they do. It is becoming less and less common these days. I would like to say, my mother and my father are absolutely the reason I'm here today. They are the best people in the world; I love them to death. This song is about my parents. So, if you have anyone, whether it's your mom and dad, aunt and uncle, someone that raised you, anyone that you look up to, this song is for them.

== Composition and lyrics ==
Over strings and a piano melody, "Momma Song" is a ballad that finds Benson Boone honoring his mother. He speaks to her directly, such as in the chorus where he sings "Take me down your old street / Tell me your memories of when you were young and when you fell in love / Drive me through the country / Tell me your story and you can play all of your favorite songs / 'Cause I'm gonna need this when I'm holding pictures of you and that's all that I've got left".

== Critical reception ==
Ashley Robinson of Melodic wrote that "Despite the vulnerable nature of the track, Boone's powerhouse voice is not held back" and "Boone belts out the chorus, which nicely contrasts with the softer pieces of the song." Nmesoma Okechukwu of Euphoria Magazine called it a "beautiful and deeply touching song" and further remarked, "He arrested my heart from the very first verse when he sang, 'Momma, I'm missing home / And California's getting colder / And colder, and colder / I miss you,' and made me teary when he asked, 'Momma, I'm getting old / Does that mean you're getting older? / And older, and older / I miss you.'" Sydney Brasil of Exclaim! criticized the song, commenting "'Momma Song' is what would happen if Adele donated one of her more forgettable, Track 7 filler songs to him. It gives the '7 Years' treatment to his mom, filled with cliches of driving through the country with her and how one day he'll only have memories when she enters the celestial kingdom."

== Music video ==
The music video was released alongside the single. It sees Boone performing the song while backed by his band and features footage from his childhood. The clip begins and ends with Boone sitting at the piano next to his mother.

== Live performances ==
Benson Boone performed the song on The Tonight Show Starring Jimmy Fallon on June 4, 2025.

== Charts ==
Chart performance for "Momma Song"
| Chart (2025) | Peak position |
|---|---|
| Canada Hot 100 (Billboard) | 78 |
| Global 200 (Billboard) | 174 |
| New Zealand Hot Singles (RMNZ) | 4 |
| Portugal Airplay (AFP) | 55 |
| UK Singles Sales (OCC) | 50 |
| US Bubbling Under Hot 100 (Billboard) | 2 |
