= Mystical Magical =

Single by Benson Boone

from the album American Heart
- Released: April 24, 2025
- Genre: Pop rock
- Length: 2:46
- Label: Night Street; Warner
- Songwriters: Benson Boone; Jack LaFrantz; Evan Blair; Steve Kipner; Terry Shaddick
- Producer: Evan Blair

Benson Boone singles chronology
"Sorry I'm Here for Someone Else" (2025)	"Mystical Magical" (2025)	"Momma Song" (2025)

Lyric video
- "Mystical Magical" on YouTube

"Mystical Magical" is a song by American singer Benson Boone. It was released on April 24, 2025, as the second single of his second studio album, American Heart. The song features interpolations from "Physical" (1981) by Olivia Newton-John.

== Background and promotion ==
On April 11, 2025, Boone performed at Coachella 2025 and announced his upcoming second studio album, American Heart, during his set. Besides performing "Bohemian Rhapsody" alongside Queen member Brian May, the singer debuted two tracks from the album, "Young American Heart" and "Mystical Magical", the latter of which was particularly noted for its use of the phrase "moonbeam ice cream". Boone referred to the track as "the moonbeam ice cream song" until its release on April 24. The song arrived with a lyric video directed by Matt Eastin that shows Boone in different settings doing cartwheels, dancing or being surrounded by balloons. Crumbl Cookies offered a "Moonbeam Ice Cream" cookie for a limited period.

== Composition and lyrics ==
"Mystical Magical" was described as a "shimmering" "poppy" song about Boone's "ethereal love" that has him face challenges urging him to carry on. He is confronted with "mixed signals" from his lover but is "not bothered about it". The track interpolates "Physical" (1981) by Olivia Newton-John and features a "jangly pop-rock production" with a "light-as-air chorus" as Boone enjoys the "otherworldly feeling" of loving somebody else. The singer shows off "high falsettos" throughout the song and showcases his "unique signature" style. It is in the key of B major.

== Critical reception ==
Flisadam Pointer at Uproxx commented positively on the song, highlighting "its sparkling energy" and the upbeat production by Evan Blair that avoids the "gloom and doom" of other romance-focused songs. Flisadam concluded that "Mystical Magical" was bound for "radio domination". Victoria Beaudet of NRJ compared the track to the works of British band Queen that impresses with Boone's "suave voice" and its full potential unleashed during the "very catchy chorus". Billboard's Jason Lipshutz thought the song was another example of Boone's vocals being the main force behind "a smash", turning his abilities into a "more delicate arrangement" with a "blissed-out falsetto as the bass pops beneath him". Pitchfork's Jeremy D. Larson was more critical, wondering if Tame Impala's Kevin Parker was "haunted by the bouncy bassline of Boone's 'Mystical Magical', not unlike how J. Robert Oppenheimer is haunted by his actions. [...] Boone's attempt at a poolside summer jam with 'Mystical Magical' feels best suited to middle school sleepovers." Paste listed it as one of the worst songs of 2025, writing: "Like the lyrics, the music keeps telling you how magical it is instead of letting anything magical happen."

== Charts ==
=== Weekly charts ===
Weekly chart performance
Chart (2025–2026)	Peak position
Argentina Anglo Airplay (Monitor Latino)	3
Australia (ARIA)	22
Austria (Ö3 Austria Top 40)	32
Belgium (Ultratop 50 Flanders)	8
Belgium (Ultratop 50 Wallonia)	10
Bolivia Anglo Airplay (Monitor Latino)	5
Brazil Airplay (Crowley)	141
Bulgaria Airplay (PROPHON)	5
Canada Hot 100 (Billboard)	17
Canada AC (Billboard)	12
Canada CHR/Top 40 (Billboard)	9
Canada Hot AC (Billboard)	9
Central America Anglo Airplay (Monitor Latino)	9
Chile Anglo Airplay (Monitor Latino)	5
Colombia Anglo Airplay (National-Report)	1
CIS Airplay (TopHit)	25
Croatia International Airplay (Top lista)	2
Czech Republic Airplay (ČNS IFPI)	3
Denmark Airplay (Tracklisten)	4
Dominican Republic Anglo Airplay (Monitor Latino)	8
Ecuador Anglo Airplay (Monitor Latino)	4
Estonia Airplay (TopHit)	6
Finland Airplay (Radiosoittolista)	38
France (SNEP)	70
Germany (GfK)	69
Global 200 (Billboard)	17
Guatemala Anglo Airplay (Monitor Latino)	9
Hungary (Rádiós Top 40)	37
Ireland (IRMA)	9
Israel International Airplay (Media Forest)	2
Japan Hot Overseas (Billboard Japan)	5
Latin America Anglo Airplay (Monitor Latino)	5
Latvia Airplay (LaIPA)	1
Lebanon (Lebanese Top 20)	10
Lithuania Airplay (TopHit)	10
Malta Airplay (Radiomonitor)	4
Mexico Anglo Airplay (Monitor Latino)	4
Netherlands (Dutch Top 40)	12
Netherlands (Single Top 100)	32
New Zealand (Recorded Music NZ)	15
Nicaragua Anglo Airplay (Monitor Latino)	2
Nigeria (TurnTable Top 100)	67
North Macedonia Airplay (Radiomonitor)	1
Norway (VG-lista)	40
Panama Anglo Airplay (Monitor Latino)	5
Panama International (PRODUCE)	47
Paraguay Airplay (Monitor Latino)	16
Peru Airplay (Monitor Latino)	11
Poland Airplay (OLiS)	4
Portugal (AFP)	70
Puerto Rico Anglo Airplay (Monitor Latino)	5
Romania Airplay (UPFR)	4
Romania Airplay (Media Forest)	7
Romania TV Airplay (Media Forest)	18
Russia Airplay (TopHit)	87
San Marino Airplay (SMRTV Top 50)	17
Serbia Airplay (Radiomonitor)	7
Slovakia Airplay (ČNS IFPI)	5
Slovenia Airplay (Radiomonitor)	2
South Africa Airplay (TOSAC)	6
Spain Airplay (Promusicae)	22
Sweden (Sverigetopplistan)	80
Switzerland (Schweizer Hitparade)	55
Ukraine Airplay (TopHit)	6
UK Singles (Official Charts)	13
Uruguay Airplay (Monitor Latino)	16
US Billboard Hot 100	17
US Adult Contemporary (Billboard)	13
US Adult Pop Airplay (Billboard)	3
US Pop Airplay (Billboard)	4
Venezuela Airplay (Record Report)	25

=== Monthly charts ===
Monthly chart performance
Chart (2025–2026)	Peak position
CIS Airplay (TopHit)	28
Estonia Airplay (TopHit)	10
Lithuania Airplay (TopHit)	24
Romania Airplay (TopHit)	4
Ukraine Airplay (TopHit)	13

=== Year-end charts ===
Year-end chart performance
Chart (2025)	Position
Argentina Anglo Airplay (Monitor Latino)	15
Australia (ARIA)	80
Belgium (Ultratop 50 Flanders)	73
Belgium (Ultratop 50 Wallonia)	54
Canada (Canadian Hot 100)	39
Canada AC (Billboard)	38
Canada CHR/Top 40 (Billboard)	53
Canada Hot AC (Billboard)	48
Chile Airplay (Monitor Latino)	97
CIS Airplay (TopHit)	62
Estonia Airplay (TopHit)	48
Global 200 (Billboard)	127
Lithuania Airplay (TopHit)	33
Netherlands (Dutch Top 40)	57
Poland (Polish Airplay Top 100)	33
Romania Airplay (TopHit)	45
UK Singles (OCC)	61
US Billboard Hot 100	47
US Adult Pop Airplay (Billboard)	29
US Pop Airplay (Billboard)	26

== Certifications ==
Certifications for "Mystical Magical"
Region	Certification	Certified units/sales
Australia (ARIA)	2× Platinum	140,000^{‡}
Austria (IFPI Austria)	Gold	15,000^{‡}
Canada (Music Canada)	3× Platinum	240,000^{‡}
France (SNEP)	Platinum	200,000^{‡}
Netherlands (NVPI)	Gold	46,500^{‡}
New Zealand (RMNZ)	Platinum	30,000^{‡}
Poland (ZPAV)	Gold	62,500^{‡}
Portugal (AFP)	Gold	12,000^{‡}
Spain (Promusicae)	Gold	50,000^{‡}
United Kingdom (BPI)	Platinum	600,000^{‡}
United States (RIAA)	3× Platinum	3,000,000^{‡}
^{‡} Sales+streaming figures based on certification alone.

== Release history ==
Release dates and formats for "Mystical Magical"
Region	Date	Format	Label(s)	Ref.
United States	June 3, 2025	Contemporary hit radio	Night Street; Warner	
