= Benson Boone =

American singer-songwriter (born 2002)

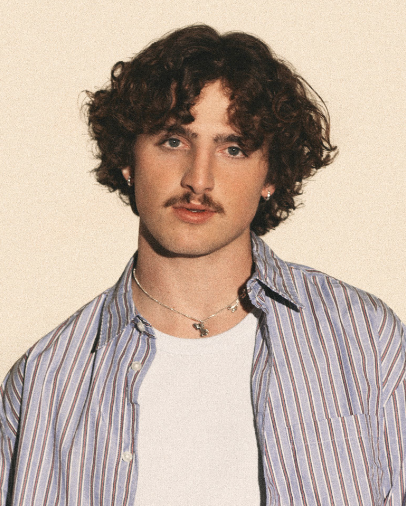
- Boone in 2024

Background information
- Born: Benson James Boone; June 25, 2002 (age 24); Monroe, Washington, U.S.
- Genres: Alternative rock; pop; pop rock
- Occupations: Singer; songwriter
- Instruments: Vocals; piano; keyboards; guitar
- Years active: 2021–present
- Labels: Warner; Night Street
- Website: bensonboone.com

Benson James Boone (born June 25, 2002) is an American singer–songwriter. He began his music career by briefly competing on American Idol in early 2021 before withdrawing voluntarily. He gained popularity on TikTok and subsequently signed a contract with Dan Reynolds's Night Street Records label and released the singles "Ghost Town" in 2021 and "In the Stars" in 2022.

Boone released his debut studio album Fireworks & Rollerblades in 2024, which reached number six on the US Billboard 200. The album was preceded with the single "Beautiful Things" which peaked at number one in multiple charts internationally, including the Billboard Global 200, and reached number two on the US Billboard Hot 100. Boone released his second studio album American Heart in 2025, preceded by various singles including "Mystical Magical".

== Early life and education ==
Benson James Boone was born on June 25, 2002, in Monroe, Washington, a suburb of Seattle. His parents are Kerry and Nate Boone. He grew up with four sisters, Kaylee, Natalee, Emma, and Claire. Boone attended Monroe High School and was a member of the school's competitive diving team as well as the tennis team. He graduated in 2020. Boone briefly attended Brigham Young University–Idaho, a private college in Rexburg, Idaho, owned and operated by the Church of Jesus Christ of Latter-day Saints (LDS Church). He studied for one semester before pausing his studies to focus on music.

Boone discovered his musical talent when a friend asked him to play the piano and sing in their high school's battle of the bands during his junior year. He had previously had no experience as a vocalist.

== Career ==
Boone drew early musical inspiration from attending a Jon Bellion concert, after which he began taking singing seriously. On a friend's recommendation, he began posting singing videos to TikTok and auditioned for season 19 of American Idol in early 2021. Boone was invited in advance to the show's Hollywood Week, but he withdrew from the competition just after winning a place in the Top 24 to focus on his career instead. His Hollywood Week performances were not televised.

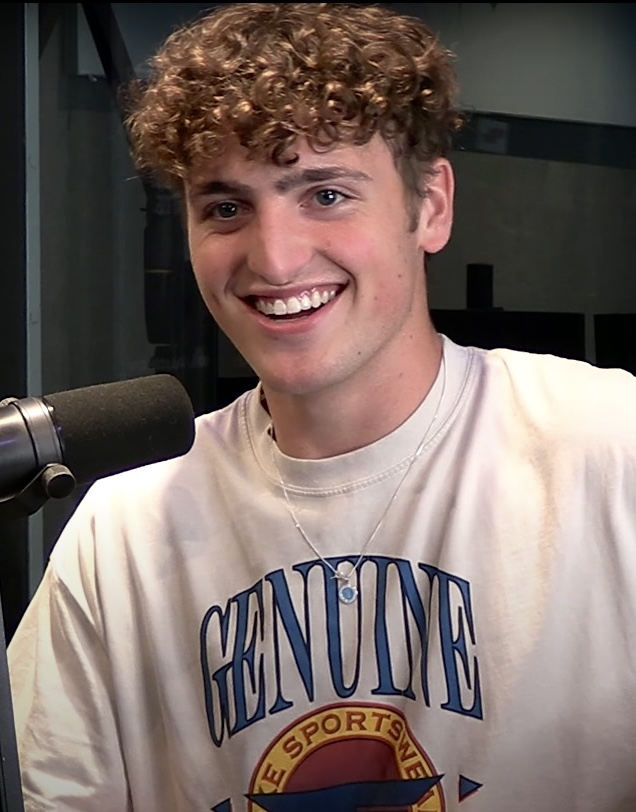
Boone in 2022

Boone began sharing snippets of his original music on TikTok, where he amassed 1.7 million followers prior to the release of his first single. He caught the attention of Imagine Dragons frontman Dan Reynolds, who signed Boone to his record label Night Street Records in partnership with Warner Records. They announced the deal on October 15, 2021, with the release of Boone's first single, "Ghost Town". Boone played drums, guitar, and piano on the recording, in addition to designing the artwork for the single. Boone performed the song on The Ellen DeGeneres Show, The Kelly Clarkson Show, and Late Night with Seth Meyers in the United States; it later charted in 14 countries, including the Billboard Hot 100 in the U.S.

Boone released his second single, "Room for 2", on February 18, 2022. Boone released multiple successful singles, including "In the Stars" (April 2022) and "Beautiful Things" (January 2024), the latter topping the charts in the United Kingdom, Australia, Canada, Norway, France, Germany, Ireland and New Zealand. It also became his first song to enter the top five on the U.S. Billboard Hot 100, reaching number two. The song preceded his debut studio album, Fireworks & Rollerblades (2024).

In May 2024, Taylor Swift announced on social media that Boone was one of three artists opening for the London shows of her Eras Tour at Wembley Stadium, alongside Paramore. Boone opened for Swift's June 23 show.

Boone played two shows at Coachella 2025, notably covering "Bohemian Rhapsody". In his first show, he featured Queen guitarist Brian May. Also at Coachella, he announced his second studio album, American Heart, which was released on June 20, 2025. To support the album, Boone embarked on the American Heart World Tour across North America and Europe from August to November 2025.

== Artistry ==
=== Musical style, influences, and voice ===
Boone's musical genres have been described as pop, pop rock and alternative rock, specifically bringing the latter genre to pop audiences. He cites Queen, Freddie Mercury, Stevie Wonder, Adele, Billy Joel, Aretha Franklin, Sam Smith, Bruce Springsteen, Elvis Presley, Elton John, and Jon Bellion as his musical inspirations. A trained acrobatic, Boone is known for his on-stage backflips, often executed during the climax of his songs. Boone has also drawn frequent comparisons to Mercury due to his wide vocal range, theatrical musical style and stage presence. Boone has addressed the comparisons, calling them a "compliment" but that he is "not trying to be anybody else but [himself]". Boone is a tenor, whose voice has been described as "emotive" and "soaring".

== Personal life ==
Although Boone was raised in the LDS Church, he no longer identifies as a church member. He still follows some of the church's values, such as abstaining from using drugs and alcohol, but because of personal preference rather than religion.

As of 2023, he lives in Los Angeles. From 2024 to 2025, he dated model, actress, and influencer Maggie Thurmon.

== Discography ==
=== Studio albums ===
- Fireworks & Rollerblades (2024)
- American Heart (2025)

== Tours ==
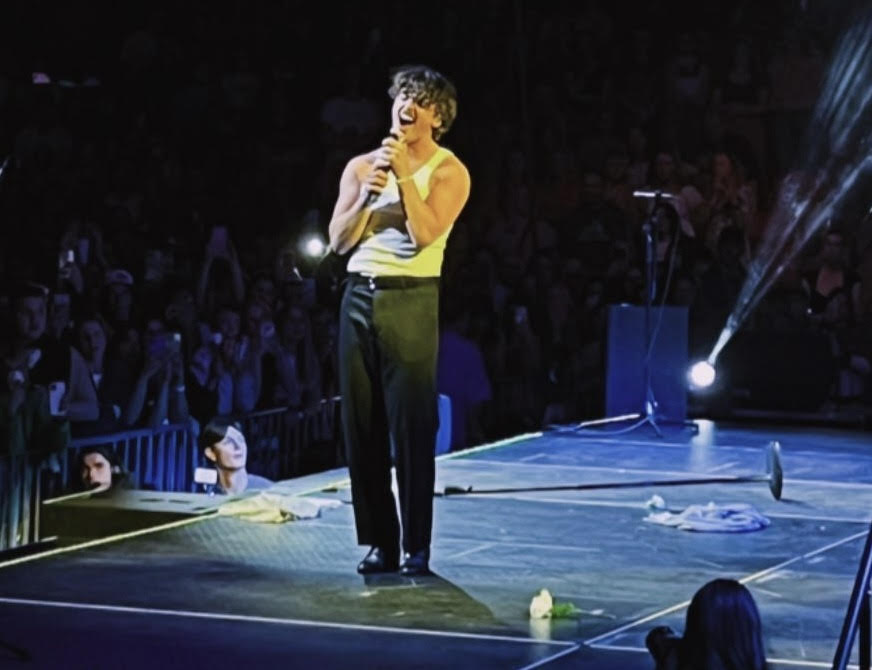
Boone performing on the Pulse Tour in 2023

=== Headlining ===
- Pulse Tour (2023)
- Fireworks & Rollerblades World Tour (2024–2025)
- American Heart World Tour (2025–2026)
- Wanted Man Tour (2026)

=== Opening act ===
- Imagine Dragons – Mercury World Tour (2023)
- Taylor Swift – The Eras Tour (2024)

== Awards and nominations ==
Award	Year (Note: Indicates the year of ceremony. Each year is linked to the article about the awards held that year, wherever possible.)	Nominee(s) / Work(s)	Category	Result	Ref.
American Music Awards	2025	Himself	New Artist of the Year	Nominated	
American Music Awards	2025	Himself	Favorite Male Pop Artist	Nominated	
American Music Awards	2025	"Beautiful Things"	Song of the Year	Nominated	
American Music Awards	2025	"Beautiful Things"	Favorite Music Video	Nominated	
American Music Awards	2025	"Beautiful Things"	Favorite Pop Song	Nominated	
APRA Awards (Australia)	2025	"Beautiful Things"	Most Performed International Work	Nominated	
Billboard Music Awards	2024	"Beautiful Things"	Top Hot 100 Song	Nominated	
Billboard Music Awards	2024	"Beautiful Things"	Top Radio Song	Nominated	
Billboard Music Awards	2024	"Beautiful Things"	Top Selling Song	Nominated	
Billboard Music Awards	2024	"Beautiful Things"	Top Billboard Global 200 Song	Won	
Billboard Music Awards	2024	"Beautiful Things"	Top Billboard Global 200 (Excl. U.S.) Song	Won	
Billboard Music Awards	2024	Himself	Top New Artist	Nominated	
Brit Awards	2025	Himself	International Artist of the Year	Nominated	
Brit Awards	2025	"Beautiful Things"	Best International Song	Nominated	
Grammy Awards	2025	Himself	Best New Artist	Nominated	
iHeartRadio Music Awards	2025	Himself	Best New Pop Artist	Nominated	
iHeartRadio Music Awards	2025	Himself	Favorite Tour Tradition	Nominated	
iHeartRadio Music Awards	2025	"Beautiful Things"	Song of the Year	Won	
iHeartRadio Music Awards	2025	"Beautiful Things"	Pop Song of the Year	Nominated	
iHeartRadio Music Awards	2025	"Beautiful Things"	Best Lyrics	Nominated	
iHeartRadio Music Awards	2025	"Beautiful Things"	Best Music Video	Nominated	
iHeartRadio Music Awards	2026	Himself	Artist of the Year	Nominated	
iHeartRadio Music Awards	2026	Himself	Best Pop Artist	Nominated	
iHeartRadio Music Awards	2026	"Sorry I'm Here for Someone Else"	Song of the Year	Nominated	
iHeartRadio Music Awards	2026	Cover song	Best Tour Tradition	Nominated	
Los 40 Music Awards	2024	Himself	Best Artist	Nominated	
Los 40 Music Awards	2024	Himself	Best New Artist	Won	
Los 40 Music Awards	2024	Himself	Best Live	Nominated	
Los 40 Music Awards	2024	"Beautiful Things"	Best Song	Won	
Los 40 Music Awards	2024	Fireworks & Rollerblades	Best Album	Nominated	
Melon Music Awards	2024	Himself	Best Pop Artist	Won	
MTV Europe Music Awards	2024	Himself	Best New	Won	
MTV Europe Music Awards	2024	"Beautiful Things"	Best Song	Nominated	
MTV Video Music Awards	2024	"Beautiful Things"	Best Alternative	Won	
MTV Video Music Awards	2024	"Beautiful Things"	Song of Summer	Nominated	
MTV Video Music Awards	2024	"In the Stars"	PUSH Performance of the Year	Nominated	
MTV Video Music Awards	2024	Himself	Best New Artist	Nominated	
MTV Video Music Awards	2025	"Mystical Magical"	Song of Summer	Nominated	
MTV Video Music Awards Japan	2025	"Beautiful Things"	Best International New Artist Video	Won	
Nickelodeon Kids' Choice Awards	2024	"Beautiful Things"	Favorite Viral Song	Nominated	
Nickelodeon Kids' Choice Awards	2025	Himself	Favorite Male Breakout Artist	Won	
NRJ Music Awards	2024	"Beautiful Things"	International Revelation	Won	
NRJ Music Awards	2024	"Beautiful Things"	International Song	Won	
NRJ Music Awards	2025	Himself	International Male Artist of the Year	Nominated	
Pollstar Awards	2026	American Heart World Tour	Pop Tour of the Year	Won	
Pollstar Awards	2026	Himself	New Headliner of the Year	Nominated	
Premios Odeón	2025	Himself	International New Artist	Won	
Swiss Music Awards	2025	Himself	Best International Solo Act	Nominated	
Swiss Music Awards	2025	Himself	Best International Breaking Act	Nominated	
Swiss Music Awards	2025	"Beautiful Things"	Best International Hit	Won	
