= Benson Boone discography =

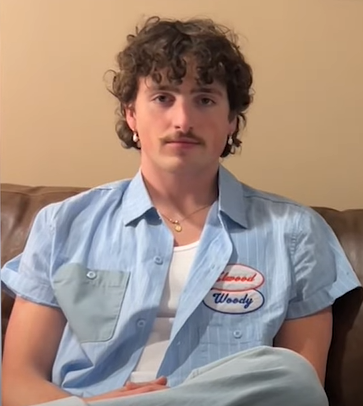
- Boone in 2024
- Studio albums: 2
- EPs: 2
- Singles: 14

American singer-songwriter Benson Boone has released two studio albums, two extended plays, and 14 singles. His music career began after withdrawing from American Idol in 2021. He released his debut single "Ghost Town" in October 2021, after signing with Night Street Records. He released his debut studio album Fireworks & Rollerblades in April 2024; it was preceded by his single "Beautiful Things", released in January 2024, which peaked at number two on the Billboard Hot 100. The album peaked at number six on the Billboard 200.

Boone released his second studio album American Heart in June 2025, following the releases of his singles "Sorry I'm Here for Someone Else" in February 2025, and "Mystical Magical" in April 2025, which peaked at numbers 19 and 17, respectively, on the Billboard Hot 100. The album reached its highest point at number 2 on the Billboard 200.

== Studio albums ==
List of studio albums, with selected details, chart positions and certifications
Title	Details	Peak chart positions									Certifications
Title	Details	US	AUS	CAN	FRA	IRE	NOR	NZ	SWE	UK	Certifications
Fireworks & Rollerblades	Released: April 5, 2024; Label: Night Street, Warner; Format: LP, CD, digital download, streaming	6	17	5	7	15	1	5	5	16	RIAA: 2× Platinum; BPI: Platinum; MC: 4× Platinum; RMNZ: 3× Platinum; SNEP: Platinum
American Heart	Released: June 20, 2025; Label: Night Street, Warner; Format: LP, CD, cassette, box set, digital download, streaming	2	1	2	11	12	7	1	19	4	RIAA: Gold; BPI: Silver; MC: Gold; RMNZ: Gold

== Extended plays ==
List of extended plays, with selected details and chart positions
Title	Details	Peak chart positions					Certifications
Title	Details	BEL (FL)	FIN	FRA	NOR	SWE	Certifications
Walk Me Home...	Released: July 29, 2022; Label: Night Street, Warner; Format: CD, digital download, streaming	109	36	184	4	16	RIAA: Gold; MC: Platinum
Pulse	Released: May 5, 2023; Label: Night Street, Warner; Format: Cassette, CD, digital download, streaming	—	—	—	—	—	
"—" denotes items which were not released in that country or failed to chart.

== Singles ==
List of singles, with selected chart positions, showing year released, certifications and album name
Title	Year	Peak chart positions										Certifications	Album
Title	Year	US	AUS	CAN	FRA	IRE	NOR	NZ	SWE	UK	WW	Certifications	Album
"Ghost Town"	2021	100	67	53	92	29	1	39	17	46	79	RIAA: Platinum; BPI: Platinum; IFPI NOR: Platinum; MC: 3× Platinum; RMNZ: 2× Platinum; SNEP: Platinum	Walk Me Home... and Fireworks & Rollerblades
"Room for 2"	2022	—	—	—	—	—	—	—	—	—	—		Walk Me Home...
"In the Stars"	2022	82	34	30	59	10	4	15	8	21	48	RIAA: 2× Platinum; ARIA: 4× Platinum; BPI: 2× Platinum; IFPI NOR: Gold; MC: 6× Platinum; RMNZ: 3× Platinum; SNEP: Diamond	Walk Me Home... and Fireworks & Rollerblades
"Better Alone"	2022	—	—	—	—	—	—	—	—	—	—		Walk Me Home...
"Before You"	2022	—	—	—	—	—	20	—	— (Note: "Before You" did not enter the Swedish Singellista Chart, but peaked at number 14 on the Swedish Heatseeker Chart.)	—	—	RIAA: Gold; MC: Platinum; RMNZ: Gold	Non-album single
"Sugar Sweet"	2023	—	—	—	—	—	—	—	—	—	—	RIAA: Gold; MC: Gold; RMNZ: Gold	Pulse
"What Was"	2023	—	—	—	—	—	—	—	—	—	—		Pulse
"To Love Someone"	2023	—	—	—	—	—	—	—	—	—	—	ARIA: Gold; MC: Gold	Non-album single
"Beautiful Things"	2024	2	1	1	1	1	1	1	3	1	1	RIAA: Diamond; ARIA: 12× Platinum; BPI: 5× Platinum; MC: Diamond; RMNZ: 8× Platinum; SNEP: Diamond	Fireworks & Rollerblades
"Slow It Down"	2024	32	21	19	82	15	14	18	39	14	23	RIAA: 2× Platinum; ARIA: 5× Platinum; BPI: 2× Platinum; MC: 2× Platinum; RMNZ: 3× Platinum; SNEP: Gold	Fireworks & Rollerblades
"Pretty Slowly"	2024	86	—	87	—	85	—	— (Note: "Pretty Slowly" did not enter the NZ Top 40 Singles Chart, but peaked at number three on the NZ Hot Singles Chart.)	— (Note: "Pretty Slowly" did not enter the Swedish Singellista Chart, but peaked at number 14 on the Swedish Heatseeker Chart.)	43	190	RIAA: Gold; BPI: Gold; RMNZ: Platinum	Fireworks & Rollerblades
"Sorry I'm Here for Someone Else"	2025	19	34	8	152	17	24	28	66	20	53	RIAA: 2× Platinum; ARIA: Platinum; BPI: Platinum; MC: 2× Platinum; RMNZ: Platinum; SNEP: Gold	American Heart
"Mystical Magical"	2025	17	22	17	70	9	40	15	80	13	17	RIAA: 3× Platinum; ARIA: Gold; BPI: Platinum; MC: 3× Platinum; RMNZ: Platinum; SNEP: Platinum	American Heart
"Momma Song"	2025	— (Note: "Momma Song" did not enter the Billboard Hot 100, but peaked at number 2 on the Bubbling Under Hot 100.)	—	78	—	—	—	— (Note: "Momma Song" did not enter the NZ Top 40 Singles Chart, but peaked at number 4 on the NZ Hot Singles Chart.)	—	—	174		American Heart
"Mr Electric Blue"	2025	73	—	64	—	79	—	— (Note: "Mr Electric Blue" did not enter the NZ Top 40 Singles Chart, but peaked at number 9 on the NZ Hot Singles Chart.)	—	55	125		American Heart
"Man in Me"	2026	—	—	—	—	—	—	— (Note: "Man in Me" did not enter the NZ Top 40 Singles Chart, but peaked at number 23 on the NZ Hot Singles Chart.)	—	—	—		American Heart
"The Time of My Life"	2026	60	—	74	—	98	—	— (Note: "The Time of My Life" did not enter the NZ Top 40 Singles Chart, but it peaked at number 3 on the NZ Hot Singles Chart.)	—	75	193		TBA
"—" denotes items which were not released in that country or failed to chart.

== Other charted and certified songs ==
List of other charted songs, with selected chart positions, showing year released, certifications and album name
Title	Year	Peak chart positions								Certifications	Album
Title	Year	US	CAN	IRE	NOR	NZ Hot	SWE	UK	WW	Certifications	Album
"Nights Like These"	2022	—	—	—	—	33	— (Note: "Nights Like These" did not enter the Swedish Singellista Chart, but peaked at number three on the Swedish Heatseeker Chart.)	—	—	RIAA: Gold; BPI: Silver; MC: Platinum; RMNZ: Platinum	Walk Me Home...
"Be Someone"	2024	—	—	—	—	18	—	—	—		Fireworks & Rollerblades
"Cry"	2024	60	52	53	36	6	78	55	86	RIAA: Gold; ARIA: Gold; BPI: Silver; MC: Platinum; RMNZ: Gold	Fireworks & Rollerblades
"Forever and a Day"	2024	—	—	—	—	27	—	—	—		Fireworks & Rollerblades
"Death Wish Love"	2024	—	—	—	—	15	—	— (Note: "Death Wish Love" landed at number 84 on the midweek equivalent of the UK Singles Chart, UK Singles Chart Update.)	—	MC: Gold	Twisters: The Album
"I Wanna Be the One You Call"	2025	—	—	—	—	26	—	—	—		American Heart
"Young American Heart"	2025	—	—	—	—	25	—	—	—		American Heart
"—" denotes items which were not released in that country or failed to chart.

== Music videos ==
Title	Year	Director(s)
"Ghost Town"	2021	Matt Eastin and Ty Arnold
"Room for 2"	2022	Matt Eastin
"Better Alone"	2022	Sophie Muller and Theo Adams
"Sugar Sweet"	2023	Matt Eastin
"Little Runaway"	2023	Declan Whitebloom
"In the Stars"	2023	Matt Eastin and Aaron Hymes
"Beautiful Things"	2024	Matt Eastin
"Slow It Down"	2024	Matt Eastin
"Pretty Slowly"	2024	Shayden Schoonover
"Momma Song"	2025	Matt Eastin
"Mr Electric Blue"	2025	Matt Eastin
"The Time of My Life"	2025	Matt Eastin & Benson Boone
