= Dinner Party: Live on Tour =

2026–2027 concert tour by Niall Horan

- Tour by Niall Horan
- Location: Australia; Europe; North America
- Associated album: Dinner Party
- Start date: 22 September 2026
- End date: 29 May 2027
- Legs: 3
- No. of shows: 57
- Supporting acts: Cameron Whitcomb; Day We Ran; Flowerovlove; Jude York

Niall Horan concert chronology
- The Show: Live on Tour (2024); Dinner Party: Live on Tour (2026–2027)

Dinner Party: Live on Tour is the ongoing fourth concert tour by Irish singer-songwriter Niall Horan, in support of his fourth studio album, Dinner Party (2026). The tour began on 22 September 2026 in Birmingham, England, and is set conclude on 29 May 2027 in Vancouver, Canada.

== Background ==
On 25 March 2026, Horan announced a tour to support his fourth studio album, Dinner Party (2026) with dates in Europe. Tickets went on sale at 10 a.m. local time on 2 April 2026. North American dates were announced on 11 May 2026. Tickets for the North American leg were available through a Citi presale that began on 12 May 2026, with artist presale the next day. General ticket sales began on 15 May 2026.

Flowerovlove was announced as an opener for all European dates.

Jude York and Day We Ran were announced as openers for the Australia dates. In September 2026, Cameron Whitcomb was announced as the opener for the North American dates.

== Set list ==
This set list is from the 22 September 2026 concert in Birmingham. It may not represent all concerts for the tour.

1. "Tastes So Good"
2. "Heartbreak Weather"
3. "Pretty"
4. "If You Leave Me"
5. "Dinner Party"
6. "Boys Are Fun"
7. "This Town"
8. "Black and White"
9. "End of an Era"
10. "Flicker"
11. "Still"
12. "Die If I Don't"
13. "Never Grow Up"
14. "On My Own"
15. "Flowers"
16. "Nice to Meet Ya"
17. "Small Talk"
18. "Steal My Girl"
19. "Little More Time"
20. "Monochromatic"
21. "Save My Life"

Encore

22. "Better Man"
23. "Slow Hands"
24. "Heaven"

== Tour dates ==
List of 2026 concerts
| Date (2026) | City | Country | Venue | Opener |
|---|---|---|---|---|
| September 22 | Birmingham | England | Utilita Arena Birmingham | Flowerovlove |
| September 23 | Newcastle | England | Utilita Arena Newcastle | Flowerovlove |
| September 25 | Manchester | England | Co-op Live | Flowerovlove |
| September 28 | Glasgow | Scotland | OVO Hydro | Flowerovlove |
| September 29 | Sheffield | England | Utilita Arena Sheffield | Flowerovlove |
| October 2 | London | England | The O2 Arena | Flowerovlove |
| October 3 | London | England | The O2 Arena | Flowerovlove |
| October 7 | Hamburg | Germany | Barclays Arena | Flowerovlove |
| October 8 | Berlin | Germany | Uber Arena | Flowerovlove |
| October 10 | Copenhagen | Denmark | Royal Arena | Flowerovlove |
| October 13 | Cologne | Germany | Lanxess Arena | Flowerovlove |
| October 15 | Amsterdam | Netherlands | Ziggo Dome | Flowerovlove |
| October 16 | Amsterdam | Netherlands | Ziggo Dome | Flowerovlove |
| October 25 | Barcelona | Spain | Palau Sant Jordi | Flowerovlove |
| October 28 | Milan | Italy | Unipol Forum | Flowerovlove |
| October 29 | Bologna | Italy | Unipol Arena | Flowerovlove |
| October 31 | Munich | Germany | Olympiahalle | Flowerovlove |
| November 3 | Kraków | Poland | Tauron Arena Kraków | Flowerovlove |
| November 5 | Antwerp | Belgium | AFAS Dome | Flowerovlove |
| November 6 | Paris | France | Accor Arena | Flowerovlove |
| November 10 | Dublin | Ireland | 3Arena | Flowerovlove |
| November 12 | Dublin | Ireland | 3Arena | Flowerovlove |
| November 13 | Dublin | Ireland | 3Arena | Flowerovlove |
| November 15 | Belfast | Northern Ireland | SSE Arena, Belfast | Flowerovlove |
| November 16 | Belfast | Northern Ireland | SSE Arena, Belfast | Flowerovlove |

List of 2027 concerts
| Date (2027) | City | Country | Venue | Opener |
|---|---|---|---|---|
| February 10 | Adelaide | Australia | Adelaide Entertainment Centre | Jude York; Day We Ran |
| February 12 | Melbourne | Australia | Rod Laver Arena | Jude York; Day We Ran |
| February 16 | Sydney | Australia | Afterpay Arena | Jude York; Day We Ran |
| February 19 | Brisbane | Australia | Brisbane Entertainment Centre | Jude York; Day We Ran |
| March 17 | Saint Paul | United States | Grand Casino Arena | Cameron Whitcomb |
| March 19 | Detroit | United States | Little Caesars Arena | Cameron Whitcomb |
| March 20 | Columbus | United States | Nationwide Arena | Cameron Whitcomb |
| March 23 | Chicago | United States | United Center | Cameron Whitcomb |
| March 26 | Indianapolis | United States | Gainbridge Fieldhouse | Cameron Whitcomb |
| March 27 | St. Louis | United States | Enterprise Center | Cameron Whitcomb |
| March 30 | Toronto | Canada | Scotiabank Arena | Cameron Whitcomb |
| April 2 | Montreal | Canada | Bell Centre | Cameron Whitcomb |
| April 4 | Brooklyn | United States | Barclays Center | Cameron Whitcomb |
| April 8 | Baltimore | United States | CFG Bank Arena | Cameron Whitcomb |
| April 12 | Boston | United States | TD Garden | Cameron Whitcomb |
| April 13 | Hartford | United States | PeoplesBank Arena | Cameron Whitcomb |
| April 15 | Raleigh | United States | Lenovo Center | Cameron Whitcomb |
| April 17 | Orlando | United States | Kia Center | Cameron Whitcomb |
| April 28 | Atlanta | United States | State Farm Arena | Cameron Whitcomb |
| April 29 | New Orleans | United States | Smoothie King Center | Cameron Whitcomb |
| May 1 | Houston | United States | Toyota Center | Cameron Whitcomb |
| May 2 | Fort Worth | United States | Dickies Arena | Cameron Whitcomb |
| May 7 | Mexico City | Mexico | Palacio de los Deportes | Cameron Whitcomb |
| May 11 | Guadalajara | Mexico | Arena VFG | Cameron Whitcomb |
| May 14 | Austin | United States | Moody Center | Cameron Whitcomb |
| May 16 | Denver | United States | Ball Arena | Cameron Whitcomb |
| May 18 | West Valley City (Note: Labeled as Salt Lake City in promotional material.) | United States | Maverik Center | Cameron Whitcomb |
| May 20 | Phoenix | United States | Mortgage Matchup Center | Cameron Whitcomb |
| May 22 | Inglewood (Note: Labeled as Los Angeles in promotional material.) | United States | Kia Forum | Cameron Whitcomb |
| May 25 | San Francisco | United States | Chase Center | Cameron Whitcomb |
| May 27 | Seattle | United States | Climate Pledge Arena | Cameron Whitcomb |
| May 29 | Vancouver | Canada | Rogers Arena | Cameron Whitcomb |
