= Gasoline and Matches =

2025 single by Cameron Whitcomb

Promotional single by Cameron Whitcomb
- Released: May 30, 2025
- Genre: Folk-pop; alternative country
- Length: 2:51
- Label: Atlantic
- Songwriters: Chance Emerson; Jack Riley; Cameron Whitcomb
- Producer: Jack Riley

Audio video
- "Gasoline and Matches" on YouTube

"Gasoline and Matches" is a song recorded by Canadian singer-songwriter Cameron Whitcomb. It was written by Whitcomb alongside Chance Emerson and Jack Riley, with the latter also serving as the producer. The track was released on May 30, 2025 as a standalone single.

== Composition ==
The song was described as a "burning anthem of memory and heartbreak", and explores the aftermath of a failed relationship and the fact that the emotions and memories cannot be destroyed as much as you try to move on.

== Track listing ==
Digital download – single

1. "Gasoline and Matches" – 2:51
2. "Bad Apple" – 2:39
3. "Options" – 2:49

== Charts ==
Chart performance for "Gasoline and Matches"
| Chart (2025) | Peak position |
|---|---|
| Canada (Canadian Hot 100) | 99 |
| New Zealand Hot Singles (RMNZ) | 21 |
