= You and Me (Cameron Whitcomb song) =

2026 single by Canadian singer-songwriter Cameron Whitcomb

Single by Cameron Whitcomb

from the EP Deep Water
- Released: March 6, 2026
- Genre: Folk rock
- Length: 2:46
- Label: Atlantic
- Songwriters: Cameron Whitcomb; Cal Shapiro; Jack Riley; Nolan Sipe
- Producer: Jack Riley

Cameron Whitcomb singles chronology
"The Hard Way" (2025)	"You and Me" (2026)	"Kingdom of Fear" (2026)

Lyric video
- "You and Me" on YouTube

"You and Me" is a song recorded by Canadian singer-songwriter Cameron Whitcomb. He wrote the track with Cal Shapiro, Nolan Sipe, and Jack Riley, the latter of whom produced it. The song marked Whitcomb's first release of 2026. Prior to its release, Whitcomb frequently performed it during his live set as an opener on Hardy's "Country! Country! Tour". It is the lead single off his extended play Deep Water.

== Critical reception ==
Heather Taylor-Singh of Billboard Canada described the song as "emotional and heartfelt," noting that it was "characterized by [Whitcomb's] soft, weathered vocals and a stomp-clap rhythm." Natalie Harmsen of CBC Music stated the song is "more relaxed than his stomp-clap-hey forward tracks from his album The Hard Way" and opined that "fans who have been wanting Whitcomb to sprint in a folkier direction will eat this up."

== Credits and personnel ==
Credits adapted from Apple Music.

- Nathan Dantzler – master engineering
- Rob Lowman – cello
- Mitch McCarthy – mix engineering
- Jack Riley – production
- Cameron Whitcomb – vocals

== Charts ==
Chart performance for "You and Me"
Chart (2026)	Peak position
Canada (Canadian Hot 100)	71
Canada CHR/Top 40 (Billboard)	22
Canada Country (Billboard)	56
Canada Hot AC (Billboard)	36
UK Country Airplay (Radiomonitor)	32
