= Options (Cameron Whitcomb song) =

2025 single by Canadian singer-songwriter Cameron Whitcomb

Single by Cameron Whitcomb

from the EP Options and the album The Hard Way
- Released: March 7, 2025
- Genre: Folk-pop; alternative country
- Length: 2:49
- Label: Atlantic
- Songwriters: Cameron Whitcomb; Cal Shapiro; Nolan Sipe; Jack Riley
- Producer: Jack Riley

Cameron Whitcomb singles chronology
"Medusa" (2024)	"Options" (2025)	"Bad Apple" (2025)

Lyric video
- "Options" on YouTube

"Options" is a song recorded by Canadian singer-songwriter Cameron Whitcomb. He wrote the track with Cal Shapiro, Nolan Sipe, and Jack Riley, the latter of whom produced it. The song is the title track for an extended play of the same name, and the third single off Whitcomb's debut album, The Hard Way.

== Background ==
In an interview, Whitcomb stated the idea for the song came to him from a dream he had been having "for a long time" after he got sober. The dream involved him remaining sober for ten years, then taking a private jet to the Yukon, bringing whisky and cocaine, and "[getting] weird" for a week. He remarked, "I'll never do it, but the idea that I'm in control, and the idea that what my life will be whatever I make it, is a big reason why I'm able to stay sober. Having these options instead of feeling like you’re trapped. I get to be sober. I get to make these choices". Whitcomb said the song's lyrics "[paint] this picture of exactly showing up to that cabin way out in the Yukon".

== Critical reception ==
Rosie Long Decter of Billboard Canada called "Options" an "energetic folk anthem" that is "supported by powerful backing vocals that lift [Whitcomb] up along the way". Derrick Rossignol stated that the song is "a dynamic track that fans of Mumford & Sons and Zach Bryan should enjoy". Victoria Goodwin of Melodic Magazine opined that, "for those who have struggled with addiction or know someone who has, Whitcomb’s willingness to be so vulnerable about the shadows of his past while standing firm in his present is what makes this song so powerful".

== Track listing ==
Digital download – single

1. "Options" – 2:49

Digital download – EP

1. "Options" – 2:49
2. "Medusa" – 2:37
3. "Hundred Mile High" – 2:52
4. "Quitter" – 2:41

== Charts ==
=== Weekly charts ===
Weekly chart performance for "Options"
Chart (2025)	Peak position
Australia Country Hot 50 (The Music)	31
Canada (Canadian Hot 100)	64
Canada AC (Billboard)	27
Canada CHR Top 40 (Billboard)	36
Canada Country (Billboard)	15
Canada Hot AC (Billboard)	13
Canada Mainstream Rock (Billboard)	33
Canada Modern Rock (Billboard)	20
New Zealand Hot Singles (RMNZ)	17
US Hot Rock & Alternative Songs (Billboard)	34

=== Year-end charts ===
Year-end chart performance for "Options"
Chart (2025)	Position
Canada Country (Billboard)	77
Canada Mainstream Rock (Billboard)	85
Canada Modern Rock (Billboard)	60

== Certifications ==
Certifications for "Options"
Region	Certification	Certified units/sales
Canada (Music Canada)	Platinum	80,000^{‡}
^{‡} Sales+streaming figures based on certification alone.
