= Hundred Mile High =

2025 promotional single by Canadian singer-songwriter Cameron Whitcomb

Promotional single by Cameron Whitcomb

from the album The Hard Way
- Released: January 31, 2025
- Genre: Folk-pop; alternative country
- Length: 2:52
- Label: Atlantic
- Songwriters: Cameron Whitcomb; Cal Shapiro; Jack Riley
- Producer: Jack Riley

Lyric video
- "Hundred Mile High" on YouTube

"Hundred Mile High" is a song recorded by Canadian singer-songwriter Cameron Whitcomb. He wrote the track with Cal Shapiro and Jack Riley, the latter of whom produced it. The song was included on Whitcomb's debut album, The Hard Way.

== Background ==
In a press release, Whitcomb stated that the song is "a story from my youth, inspired by moments that stuck with me". The song serves as the title for Whitcomb's upcoming "Hundred Mile High Tour" in the United States in March and April 2025.

== Critical reception ==
Alli Patton of Holler called the song an "all-out anthem," noting "hearty rhythms, exuberant chords and distant harmonies". She added that the track's "uplifting, carefree sound" is something that "doesn't quite mirror the turbulence stirring between the words". Clare Gehlich of Melodic Magazine favourably reviewed the track, opining that Whitcomb's "wildly colourful yet deeply lived-in storytelling takes hold" in "Hundred Mile High.

== Track listing ==
Digital download – single

1. "Hundred Mile High" – 2:52
2. "Medusa" – 2:37
3. "Quitter" – 2:41

== Charts ==
Chart performance for "Hundred Mile High"
Chart (2025)	Peak position
Canada (Canadian Hot 100)	88
New Zealand Hot Singles (RMNZ)	10
US Hot Rock & Alternative Songs (Billboard)	33

== Certifications ==
Certifications for "Hundred Mile High"
Region	Certification	Certified units/sales
Canada (Music Canada)	Gold	40,000^{‡}
^{‡} Sales+streaming figures based on certification alone.
