= Would U Still Love Me =

2026 single by Diplo and Cameron Whitcomb

Single by Diplo and Cameron Whitcomb

from the EP Whitcomb vs. Flores
- Released: May 21, 2026
- Genre: Country pop
- Length: 2:36
- Label: Hollertronix; Atlantic Outpost
- Songwriters: Gian Michael Stone; Henry Agincourt Allen; Ilsey Juber; Jesse Fink; Mark Schick; Thomas Wesley Pentz
- Producers: Diplo; King Henry

Diplo singles chronology
"Red Eye" (2026)	"Would U Still Love Me" (2026)

Cameron Whitcomb singles chronology
"Kingdom of Fear" (2026)	"Would U Still Love Me" (2026)	"Hollow" (2026)

Lyric video
- "Would U Still Love Me" on YouTube

"Would U Still Love Me" is a song recorded by American producer Diplo and Canadian singer Cameron Whitcomb. Diplo wrote the track with Gian Michael Stone, Ilsey Juber, Jesse Fink, Mark Schick, and Henry Agincourt Allen. The song was released as part of a two-song Diplo project titled "Whitcomb vs. Flores".

== Background ==
Whitcomb joined Diplo during the producer's set at the Stagecoach Festival in April 2026 to tease a preview of the track. Diplo remarked that Whitcomb was "part of a new generation of country superstars".

== Critical reception ==
Lana Overton of mxdwn described "Would U Still Love Me" as "anthemic" and "immediate". She opined that Whitcomb's vocals bring "a rough-edged sincerity to the song," while adding that there is a "little country-rock energy running through it, too, making it easy to imagine blasting out of speakers during summer festival season."

== Credits and personnel ==
Credits adapted from Apple Music.

- Aksel Coe – drums
- Nathan Dantzler – mastering engineer
- Diplo – production, vocals
- Jesse Ray Ernster – mixing engineer
- Jesse Fink – background vocals
- King Henry – production
- Ilsey Juber – background vocals
- Mark Schick – background vocals
- Gian Michael Stone – background vocals
- Cameron Whitcomb – vocals

== Track listings ==
Streaming – single

1. "Would U Still Love Me" – 2:36

Digital download – single

1. "Would U Still Love Me - VIP" – 2:14

Digital download – single

1. "Would U Still Love Me (Lost Frequencies Remix)" – 3:30
2. "Would U Still Love Me - VIP" – 2:14
3. "Would U Still Love Me" – 2:36

== Charts ==
=== Weekly charts ===
Weekly chart performance for "Would U Still Love Me"
Chart (2026)	Peak position
Australia Country Hot 50 (The Music)	30
Canada (Canadian Hot 100)	71
New Zealand Hot Singles (RMNZ)	28
US Dance Airplay (Billboard)	40
