= Flowerovlove =

British-Ivorian singer and songwriter

- Also known as: Flowerovlove
- Born: 18 February 2005 (age 21); London, England
- Genres: Bubblegum pop; pop; alternative pop; pop rock; indie electronic
- Occupations: Singer, songwriter, producer
- Instruments: Vocals
- Years active: 2020–present
- Label: Capitol

Joyce Cissé (born 18 February 2005), known professionally as Flowerovlove, is an English singer-songwriter, producer and model. She debuted as a teenager in 2020 and released two EPs independently. She signed to Capitol Records in 2023, under which her third EP Ache in My Tooth (2024) and debut studio album Mini Skirt Warrior (2026) were released.

Cissé won Artist to Watch at the 2022 A&R Awards and New Artist at the 2024 Music Week Women in Music Awards. In 2022, she was named one of VEVO's Artists to Watch and The Forty Five's Future Five, and named Future Artist of the Month by BBC Radio 1 in 2023.

== Early life and education ==
Joyce Cissé was born on 18 February 2005, in London, England, to Ivorian parents and grew up in South London and Essex, speaking Mandinka at home. In 2022, she was attending a sixth-form college where she was pursuing A-Levels in English, French, and History.

== Music career ==
=== 2020–2022: Think Flower and A Mosh Pit in the Clouds ===
Cissé started making her own music at the age of six and has memories of writing song ideas, in a notebook her aunt gifted her, as early as 10. However, it was not until the COVID-19 pandemic that she decided to pursue music professionally.

At the age of 15 in August 2020, Cissé released her debut single "Kiss & Chase"; "Unseen Miracles" and "Fat Wave" followed later in the year. She released her debut EP Think Flower in May 2021, which caught the attention of music manager and FAE grp vice president Jesse Dickson, who signed her shortly after. The EP features production and songwriting input from her brother Wilfred Cissé and Isaac Levine. She claimed care for the planet and humanity inspired the EP, with several songs referencing nature. She had her first live gig at Laylow the following month. In August, Cissé released the lo-fi rap single "Malibu", which amassed over 3 million streams, and then the psychedelic pop track "Saturday Yawning" in December.

In early 2022, Cissé released the singles "I Love This Song", "Will We Ever Get This Right", and "Hannah Montana". The former featured in the launch campaign for Hailey Bieber's skincare line Rhode, and its amitybloc-directed music video received a nomination for Best Pop Video Newcomer at the 2022 UK Music Video Awards. In November, Cissé's second EP A Mosh Pit in the Clouds was released, which included contributions from the Invisible Men, Dan Smith, Wilfred Cissé, and GG. The EP was accompanied by the singles "Get with You", "I Gotta I Gotta", and "Out for the Weekend". Also that autumn, Cissé made her UK live television debut performing the EP's second single "I Gotta I Gotta" on BBC's Blue Peter and supported Role Model on his tour titled TourX.

=== 2023–present: Signing with Capitol and Ache in My Tooth ===
Cissé had her first headline dates in early 2023, with support from Lexie Carroll and Kilu. This was followed by performances at Primavera Sound, TRNSMT, Latitude Festival on the BBC Sounds stage, Standon Calling, Boardmasters Festival, and Pukkelpop. In September, she performed for Mulberry.

On her 18th birthday, Cissé signed with Capitol Records. She released the singles "Love You", "Coffee Shop", "Next Best Exit" and "a girl like me" in 2023 and "BOYS" in 2024. "Love You" ended up on the season 3 soundtrack of the Netflix series Heartstopper, in which Cissé credited Heartstopper fans for making that happen, while "a girl like me" gained popularity on social media for its queer-inclusive bridge.

Cissé made her debut at the 2024 Glastonbury Music Festival on the Park Stage. She also performed at Tramlines Festival, Kendal Calling, and Camp Bestival. Through Capitol, Cissé released her third EP Ache in My Tooth that October, with the singles "breaking news" and "erase u" ahead of its release. For the EP, which tells a chronological story "about different types of love", Cissé collaborated with the likes of Skyler Stonestreet and Amy Allen.

== Modeling career ==
For a time, Cissé worked a model, partaking in campaigns for fashion brands such as Gucci, Pangaia, Maison Kitsuné, and Swarovski. She walked multiple fashion weeks, including Paris Fashion Week for the clothing line Xuly Bët. Cissé named Grace Jones her "main fashion icon".

== Artistry ==
Interested in pop from a young age, Cissé grew up in listening to Frank Ocean, One Direction, and Justin Bieber as well as ABBA and Boney M through her mother. She said One Direction's "Best Song Ever" (2013) helped her realise the "power of music… [and] creative visuals", as the group "didn't just release a song, they released a world". As she grew older, she developed an interest in indie music, citing Tame Impala as one of her main influences, particularly their albums Lonerism (2012) and Currents (2015), as well as the Strokes and Strawberry Guy. She told Wonderland in December 2021:

What sparked my interest to start making it was how I felt listening to other people's music such as Frank Ocean, Tame Impala, especially, and the nostalgia I get from One Direction. I want to re-create that feeling of nostalgia.

Arielle Lana LeJarde of The Fader and Daphne Chouliaraki Milner of Atmos described Cissé's initial work as a blend of different genre influences, including bedroom pop, trap, neo-soul, dream pop, indie rock, pop punk, and psychedelic. Ella Chadwick of Hunger corroborated that Cissé's second EP had "an injection of pop punk".

Regarding her 2024 singles, Cissé told Flood Magazine: "I've always wanted to go a little bit more pop, but there will always be a twang of alternative". One of them, "breaking news", was inspired by Rex Orange County's "Loving Is Easy" (2017) and featured in the film The Housemaid. In an interview with NME in the lead up to her third EP, a series of "glitter gel pen" pop love songs, Cissé talked about the assumption she has a "Willow Smith or a soul vibe" because "I don't make that kind of music, I make pop... there's a space to be filled for a Black girl in pop".

In March 2025, 10 Magazine's Isobel Van Dyke described Cissé's music as bubblegum pop.

== Discography ==
=== Studio albums ===
Title	Details
Mini Skirt Warrior	Released: 28 August 2026; Label: Capitol; Format: LP, digital download, streaming

=== Compilation albums ===
Title	Details
Summerovlove Setlist	Released: 13 May 2025; Label: Universal; Format: Streaming

=== EPs ===
Title	Details
Think Flower	Released: 14 May 2021; Label: Self-released; Format: Digital download, streaming
A Mosh Pit in the Clouds	Released: 10 November 2022; Label: Self-released; Format: Digital download, streaming
Ache in My Tooth	Released: 11 October 2024; Label: Capitol; Format: Digital download, streaming

=== Singles ===
Year	Song	Album
2020	"Kiss & Chase"	Non-album singles
2020	"Unseen Miracles"	Non-album singles
2020	"Fat Wave"	Non-album singles
2021	"Malibu"	Non-album singles
2021	"Saturday Yawning"	Non-album singles
2022	"I Love This Song"	Non-album singles
2022	"Will We Ever Get This Right"	Non-album singles
2022	"Hannah Montana"	Non-album singles
2022	"Get with You"	A Mosh Pit in the Clouds
2022	"I Gotta I Gotta"	A Mosh Pit in the Clouds
2022	"Out for the Weekend"	A Mosh Pit in the Clouds
2023	"Love You"	Non-album single
2023	"Coffee Shop"	Summerlove Setlist
2023	"Next Best Exit"	Summerlove Setlist
2023	"A Girl Like Me"	Ache in My Tooth
2024	"Boys"	Summerlove Setlist
2024	"Breaking News"	Ache in My Tooth
2024	"Erase U"	Ache in My Tooth
2025	"I've Seen Ur Ex"	Summerlove Setlist
2025	"New Friends"	Non-album single
2025	"I'm Your First"	Mini Skirt Warrior
2025	"Shady"	Mini Skirt Warrior
2025	"Wishlist"	Non-album singles
2026	"Casual Lady"	Non-album singles
2026	"American Wedding"	Mini Skirt Warrior
2026	"In My Victoria's Secret"	Mini Skirt Warrior
2026	"Kiss Kiss Kiss"	Mini Skirt Warrior

== Tours ==
Opening act

- Halsey - For My Last Trick: The Tour (2025)
- Haim - I Quit Tour (2025)
- Niall Horan - Dinner Party: Live on Tour (2026-2027)

== Awards ==
Year	Awards	Category	Nominee	Result	Ref
2022	UK Music Video Awards	Best Video Newcomer	"I Love This Song"	Nominated	
2022	A&R Awards	Artist to Watch	Herself	Won	
2023	AIM Independent Music Awards	One to Watch	Herself	Nominated	
2024	Women in Music Awards	New Artist	Herself	Won	
2025	MOBO Awards	Best Newcomer	Herself	Nominated	
