= Hollow (Marshmello and Cameron Whitcomb song) =

2026 single by Marshmello and Cameron Whitcomb

Single by Marshmello and Cameron Whitcomb
- Released: August 28, 2026
- Genre: Country pop
- Length: 3:15
- Label: Big Loud; Mercury; Joytime
- Songwriters: Marshmello; Earwulf; Connor McDonough; Riley McDonough; Jake Torrey; Joel Castillo
- Producers: Marshmello; Earwulf; Joel Castillo

Marshmello singles chronology
"Another Drink" (2026)	"Hollow" (2026)	"Close My Eyes" (2026)

Cameron Whitcomb singles chronology
"Would U Still Love Me" (2026)	"Hollow" (2026)

Lyric video
- "Hollow" on YouTube

"Hollow" is a song recorded by American producer and DJ Marshmello and Canadian singer Cameron Whitcomb. The song was written by Connor McDonough, Riley McDonough, Jake Torrey, Marshmello, Earwulf, and Joel Castillo, while the latter three produced the track.

== Background ==
"Hollow" continued a string of 2025-2026 collaborations between Marshmello and country singers, including "Another Drink". It also marked Whitcomb's second collaboration with a DJ, following "Would U Still Love Me" earlier in 2026.

== Critical reception ==
David Pierce of Today's Country Magazine favourably reviewed "Hollow", stating that it is "polished, emotionally persuasive single that finds uncommon warmth in the space between confession and collapse" and opining that it is "sleek enough for pop and dance audiences, grounded enough to satisfy country-leaning listeners, and specific enough to avoid the anonymity that can haunt cross-genre experiments." Heather Taylor-Singh of Billboard Canada described the song as "an intimate track that culminates in a heartfelt chorus," noting that Whitcomb's "gritty delivery is layered with shimmering neon synths and a pulsating four-on-the-floor beat." Aryn Honaker of Mxdwn opined that the song "exists somewhere between a melancholic, almost nostalgic tune and a catchy, bouncy track to dance to."

== Credits and personnel ==
Credits adapted from Apple Music.

- Earwulf – production
- Piéce Eatah – recording engineer
- Kevin Grainger – mastering engineer, mixing engineer, immersive mixing engineer
- Marshmello – production
- Connor McDonough – production
- Josh Sutton-Smith – engineer

== Charts ==
Weekly chart performance for "Hollow"
Chart (2026)	Peak position
Canada Hot 100 (Billboard)	85
Latvia Airplay (LaIPA)	15
Netherlands (Single Tip)	30
New Zealand Hot Singles (RMNZ)	29
US Hot Dance/Electronic Songs (Billboard)	15
