= Cameron Whitcomb =

Canadian singer-songwriter (born 2003)

- Born: March 20, 2003 (age 23); Peace River, Alberta, Canada
- Origin: Nanaimo, British Columbia
- Genres: Country; alternative country; folk rock; folk-pop
- Occupations: Singer, songwriter
- Instruments: Guitar, vocals
- Years active: 2021–present
- Label: Atlantic
- Website: Official website

Cameron Donald Whitcomb is a Canadian singer and songwriter from Nanaimo, British Columbia. He competed on season 20 of reality television show American Idol. He is currently signed to Atlantic Records. Whitcomb has charted multiple songs internationally, including "Quitter", "Medusa", "Options", and "Kingdom of Fear". His debut album The Hard Way was released on September 26, 2025.

Whitcomb is known for his frenetic live performances, sound that fuses country and folk pop music, and songwriting that encompasses themes that include addiction, mental health, failed relationships and other personal struggles.

== Early life ==
Whitcomb was born in Peace River, Alberta, but raised in Nanaimo, British Columbia. Growing up, he primarily listened to rap music, including Eminem, Swollen Members, and Madchild. Around the age of seventeen, Whitcomb left home and moved to Kamloops, where he began working on the Trans Mountain Pipeline. Around the same time, his brother introduced him to Johnny Cash, and Whitcomb subsequently began singing after becoming a fan of Tyler Childers. At nineteen, while continuing to work on the pipeline, Whitcomb began to post karaoke videos of himself singing on Reddit.

== Career ==
In 2022, an American Idol executive found a video of Whitcomb singing on Reddit and reached out to him. He subsequently competed on season 20 of the show, and reached the top 20 of the competition before being eliminated. Whitcomb decided to seriously pursue a career in music after exiting the show.

In 2023, Whitcomb released the song "Shoot Me Dead". He then signed a record deal with Atlantic Records and released the song "Rocking Chair" in May 2024. In July 2024, Whitcomb released the single "Quitter". The song was sent to radio formats in Canada, the United Kingdom, and Australia, and later became his first charting entry on the all-genre Canadian Hot 100. He released his debut extended play, also titled Quitter on September 27, 2024. In November 2024, Whitcomb released the song "Medusa". He embarked on his headlining "Quitter Tour" throughout late 2024 and early 2025 in the United States and Canada. Whitcomb released the song "Hundred Mile High" in January 2025, and he is set to return to the U.S. on his "Hundred Mile High Tour" in March and April 2025. In March 2025, he released the song "Options". In the spring of 2025, he released the songs "Bad Apple" and "Gasoline and Matches". In September 2025, Whitcomb performed at the 2025 Canadian Country Music Association Awards, where he tied for the most nominations with six in total, and won Breakthrough Artist or Group of the Year and the Fans' Choice Award.

Whitcomb released his debut album The Hard Way on September 26, 2025. He supported Hardy's "Country! Country! Tour" in North America in early 2026. In March 2026, he released the single "You and Me". In May 2026, Whitcomb will head to Australia and New Zealand for his headlining "The Hard Way Tour". He was nominated for five awards at the Juno Awards of 2026, and won Breakthrough Artist or Group of the Year and Country Album of the Year making him the first American Idol contestant to win a Juno Award. On April 17, 2026, Whitcomb released the extended play Deep Water, which included "You and Me" and "Kingdom of Fear". In May 2026, he collaborated with Diplo on the single "Would U Still Love Me". In August 2026, he collaborated with Marshmello on the single "Hollow".

He will be touring with Niall Horan on the North American leg of his Dinner Party tour.

== Personal life ==
Whitcomb admitted in an interview that he has struggled with addiction since he was twelve years old. His song "Quitter" was inspired by his battle with addiction, and becoming sober. Whitcomb currently lives in Port Alberni, British Columbia.

== Discography ==
=== Studio albums ===
List of studio albums, with selected details
Title	Details	Peak chart positions		Certifications
Title	Details	CAN	AUS	Certifications
The Hard Way	Release date: September 26, 2025; Label: Atlantic; Format: CD, LP, digital download, streaming	12	29	MC: Platinum

=== Extended plays ===
List of EPs, with selected details
Title	Details	Peak chart positions
Title	Details	CAN
Quitter	Release date: September 27, 2024; Label: Atlantic; Format: Digital download, streaming	—
Options	Release date: March 17, 2025; Label: Atlantic; Format: Digital download, streaming	—
Deep Water	Release date: April 17, 2026; Label: Atlantic; Format: CD, digital download, streaming	88

=== Singles ===
Title	Year	Peak chart positions										Certifications	Album
Title	Year	CAN	AUS	BEL (FL)	IRE	NLD	NOR	NZ Hot	UK	US	US Rock	Certifications	Album
"Quitter"	2024	33	—	—	—	—	—	—	—	—	—	MC: 3× Platinum; ARIA: Gold; RMNZ: Gold	The Hard Way
"Medusa"	2024	63	—	5	93	44	29	—	—	—	29	MC: 2× Platinum; ARIA: Gold; RMNZ: Gold	The Hard Way
"Options"	2025	64	—	—	—	—	—	17	—	—	34	MC: Platinum	The Hard Way
"Bad Apple"	2025	—	—	—	—	—	—	26	—	—	—		Non-album single
"The Hard Way"	2025	—	—	—	—	—	—	35	—	—	—	MC: Gold	The Hard Way
"You and Me"	2026	71	—	—	—	—	—	—	—	—	—		Deep Water
"Kingdom of Fear"	2026	2	40	2	94	29	91	25	54	89	20	MC: 2× Platinum; BPI: Silver	Deep Water
"Would U Still Love Me" (with Diplo)	2026	71	—	—	—	—	—	28	—	—	—		Non-album singles
"Hollow" (with Marshmello)	2026	85	—	—	—	— (Note: "Hollow" did not enter the Dutch Single Top 100, but peaked at number 30 on the Dutch Single Tip chart.)	—	29	—	—	—		Non-album singles
"—" denotes releases that did not chart or were not released to that territory.

==== Promotional singles ====
Title	Year	Peak chart positions			Certifications	Album
Title	Year	CAN	NZ Hot	US Rock	Certifications	Album
"Shoot Me Dead"	2023	—	—	—		Non-album singles
"The Devil I've Seen"	2024	—	—	—		Non-album singles
"Rocking Chair"	2024	—	—	—		Non-album singles
"Love Myself"	2024	—	37	—		Quitter
"Hundred Mile High"	2025	88	10	33	MC: Gold	The Hard Way
"Gasoline and Matches"	2025	99	21	—		Non-album single
"Fragile"	2025	—	—	—	MC: Gold	The Hard Way
"Deep Water"	2026	—	16	—		Deep Water
"Want for Nothing"	2026	98	17	—		The Hard Way
"—" denotes releases that did not chart.

=== Music videos ===
Title	Year	Director
"The Devil I've Seen"	2024	Not listed

== Tours ==
- Quitter Tour (2024–2025)
- Hundred Mile High Tour (2025)
- I've Got Options Tour (2025)
- The Hard Way Tour (2026)
- Fragile Egos Tour (2026)
- Kingdom of Fear Tour (2026)

== Awards and nominations ==
Award	Year	Category	Nominated work	Result	Ref
Canadian Country Music Awards	2025	Breakthrough Artist or Group of the Year	—N/a	Won	
Canadian Country Music Awards	2025	Entertainer of the Year	—N/a	Nominated	
Canadian Country Music Awards	2025	Fans' Choice	—N/a	Won	
Canadian Country Music Awards	2025	Male Artist of the Year	—N/a	Nominated	
Canadian Country Music Awards	2025	Single of the Year	"Quitter"	Nominated	
Canadian Country Music Awards	2025	Songwriter(s) of the Year	"Quitter" (with Ben Cottrill, David Schaeman, Nolan Sipe)	Nominated	
Country Music Association Awards	2025	Global Country Achievement Award		Won	
Juno Awards	2026	Breakthrough Artist or Group of the Year		Won	
Juno Awards	2026	Fan Choice Award		Nominated	
Juno Awards	2026	Album of the Year	The Hard Way	Nominated	
Juno Awards	2026	Country Album of the Year	The Hard Way	Won	
Juno Awards	2026	Single of the Year	"Options"	Nominated	
