= Kingdom of Fear (song) =

2026 single by Cameron Whitcomb

Single by Cameron Whitcomb

from the EP Deep Water
- Released: March 27, 2026
- Length: 2:41
- Label: Atlantic
- Songwriters: Cameron Whitcomb; Cal Shapiro; Jack Riley; Nolan Sipe
- Producer: Jack Riley

Cameron Whitcomb singles chronology
"You and Me" (2026)	"Kingdom of Fear" (2026)	"Would U Still Love Me" (2026)

Music video
- "Kingdom of Fear" on YouTube

"Kingdom of Fear" is a song recorded by Canadian singer-songwriter Cameron Whitcomb. He wrote the track with his frequent collaborators Cal Shapiro, Nolan Sipe, and Jack Riley, the latter of whom produced it. The song was released as a single from Whitcomb's 2026 extended play Deep Water.

Whitcomb titled the song after American countercultural writer and journalist Hunter S. Thompson's (1937–2005) 2003 non-fiction book Kingdom of Fear: Loathsome Secrets of a Star-Crossed Child in the Final Days of the American Century.

== Critical reception ==
James Daykin of Entertainment Focus positively reviewed "Kingdom of Fear", referring to it as a "high octane track" that "finds Whitcomb at his most urgent and unfiltered—blending grit, vulnerability and a sense of emotional reckoning into a sound that continues to push beyond genre boundaries". Chris Barilla of People opined that the song "keeps listeners on their feet from start to finish".

== Credits and personnel ==
Credits adapted from Apple Music.

- Nathan Dantzler – master engineering
- Chance Emerson – additional production
- Rob Lowman – cello
- Mitch McCarthy – mix engineering
- Jack Riley – production
- Cameron Whitcomb – vocals

== Charts ==
Chart performance for "Kingdom of Fear"
Chart (2026)	Peak position
Australia (ARIA)	40
Australia Airplay (RCS)	14
Australia Country Hot 50 (The Music)	1
Belgium (Ultratop 50 Flanders)	2
Belgium (Ultratop 50 Wallonia)	13
Canada (Canadian Hot 100)	2
Canada AC (Billboard)	9
Canada CHR/Top 40 (Billboard)	3
Canada Country (Billboard)	11
Canada Hot AC (Billboard)	4
Canada Mainstream Rock (Billboard Canada)	23
Canada Modern Rock (Billboard Canada)	9
Ireland (IRMA)	94
Netherlands (Dutch Top 40)	6
Netherlands (Single Top 100)	26
Netherlands Airplay (Dutch Charts)	10
New Zealand Hot Singles (RMNZ)	25
Norway (IFPI Norge)	91
Sweden Heatseeker (Sverigetopplistan)	4
UK Singles (Official Charts)	54
UK Country Airplay (Radiomonitor)	2
US Billboard Hot 100	89
US Adult Pop Airplay (Billboard)	15
US Hot Country Songs (Billboard)	24
US Hot Rock & Alternative Songs (Billboard)	18

== Certifications ==
Certifications for "Kingdom of Fear"
Region	Certification	Certified units/sales
Canada (Music Canada)	2× Platinum	160,000^{‡}
United Kingdom (BPI)	Silver	200,000^{‡}
^{‡} Sales+streaming figures based on certification alone.
