= Another Drink =

2026 single by Marshmello and Kelsea Ballerini

Single by Marshmello and Kelsea Ballerini
- Released: June 26, 2026
- Length: 2:33
- Label: Big Loud; Mercury
- Songwriters: Marshmello; Alysa Vanderheym; Earwulf; Jessie Jo Dillon; Joel Castillo
- Producers: Marshmello; Alysa Vanderheym; Earwulf

Marshmello singles chronology
"Free Mason" (2026)	"Another Drink" (2026)	"Hollow" (2026)

Kelsea Ballerini singles chronology
"I Sit in Parks" (2026)	"Another Drink" (2026)	"Math of Us" (2026)

Visualizer
- "Another Drink" on YouTube

"Another Drink" is a song by American DJ Marshmello and American singer Kelsea Ballerini. It was released on June 26, 2026, through Big Loud and Mercury Records. The song was produced by Marshmello, Alysa Vanderheym, and Earwulf, who all wrote the song with Jessie Jo Dillon and Joel Castillo.

== Background and composition ==
Ballerini said in a press release that she has been a friend and fan of Marshmello for years, and they have always wanted to work on music together, while Marshmello stated he enjoyed the challenge of applying his production style to a country track. Lyrically, "Another Drink" depicts a carefree night out at a bar following a breakup. In the second verse, Ballerini sings about feeling empowered and her determination to move on. The song may have been inspired by Ballerini's split from actor Chase Stokes.

== Promotion and release ==
Ballerini teased "Another Drink" on social media in the week before its release. On June 16, 2026, she posted a video hinting at the song's theme and revealing her collaboration with Marshmello, followed by a snippet of the song the next day.

== Charts ==
Chart performance
Chart (2026)	Peak position
Belgium (Ultratop 50 Flanders)	25
Canada Hot 100 (Billboard)	83
Latvia Airplay (LaIPA)	17
New Zealand Hot Singles (RMNZ)	14
US Billboard Hot 100	60
US Hot Country Songs (Billboard)	20
US Hot Dance/Electronic Songs (Billboard)	2
