= Walk Me Home... =

EP by Benson Boone
- Released: July 29, 2022
- Length: 24:05
- Labels: Night Street; Warner
- Producers: David Arkwright; Jason Evigan; Jason Suwito; Joe London; Jorgen Odegard; JT Daly; Justin Gammella; William Larsen

Benson Boone chronology
| Walk Me Home... (2022) | Pulse (2023) |

Singles from Walk Me Home...
- 1. "Ghost Town" Released: October 15, 2021; 2. "Room for 2" Released: February 18, 2022; 3. "In the Stars" Released: April 29, 2022; 4. "Better Alone" Released: July 22, 2022

Walk Me Home... is the debut extended play by American singer and songwriter Benson Boone, released on July 29, 2022, through Dan Reynolds' label Night Street and Warner Records. It was preceded by four singles—the internationally charting "Ghost Town" and "In the Stars", as well as "Room for 2" and "Better Alone".

== Critical reception ==
Professional ratings
Review scores
| Source | Rating |
|---|---|
| The Line of Best Fit | 4/10 |

Asher White of The Line of Best Fit was almost entirely negative, describing the EP as "a half-hour of plodding, cloying ballads, with few shifts in dynamics or tone. Its homogeneity is almost impressive, as is its commitment to sparse, Instagram-filter-production that isolates Boone's piano playing and voice". White found that Boone's "singular mode is a strained, impassioned belt that he'll pitch up to a falsetto when he needs to signify sensitivity" and called his pronunciation "almost parodically indie", while his music "seems meant for no one, too broad in its style to feasibly target a specific audience yet too impersonal to be for Boone himself". White concluded that unless Boone finds an "engaging producer", "he will be as lost as his album cover suggests".

== Track listing ==
Walk Me Home... track listing
| No. | Title | Writer(s) | Producer(s) | Length |
|---|---|---|---|---|
| 1. | "Ghost Town" | Benson Boone; JT Daly; Nolan Sipe; Tushar Apte | Daly | 3:13 |
| 2. | "Let Me Go" | Boone; David Arkwright; Justin Gammella; Sipe | Arkwright; Gammella | 2:39 |
| 3. | "In the Stars" | Boone; Jason Evigan; Michael Pollack | Evigan | 3:36 |
| 4. | "Better Alone" | Boone; Jack LaFrantz; Jason Suwito | Suwito | 3:29 |
| 5. | "Nights Like These" | Boone; Sipe | Daly | 2:52 |
| 6. | "Empty Heart Shaped Box" | Boone; Sipe; Joe London; Neil Ormandy | London | 2:56 |
| 7. | "Room for 2" | Boone; Jorgen Odegard; Phil Plested | Odegard | 2:31 |
| 8. | "Work of Art" | Boone; LaFrantz; William Larsen | Suwito; Larsen | 2:49 |
| Total length: | | | | 24:05 |

== Charts ==
Chart performance for Walk Me Home...
| Chart (2022–2023) | Peak position |
|---|---|
| Belgian Albums (Ultratop Flanders) | 109 |
| Finnish Albums (Suomen virallinen lista) | 36 |
| French Albums (SNEP) | 184 |
| Norwegian Albums (VG-lista) | 4 |
| Swedish Albums (Sverigetopplistan) | 16 |
| UK Album Downloads (Official Charts) | 100 |
| US Heatseekers Albums (Billboard) | 3 |

== Certifications ==
Certifications for Walk Me Home...
| Region | Certification | Certified units/sales |
|---|---|---|
| Canada (Music Canada) | Platinum | 80,000^{‡} |
| New Zealand (RMNZ) | Gold | 7,500^{‡} |
| United Kingdom (BPI) | Silver | 60,000^{‡} |
| United States (RIAA) | Gold | 500,000^{‡} |
^{‡} Sales+streaming figures based on certification alone.
