= Beautiful Things (Benson Boone song) =

Single by Benson Boone

from the album Fireworks & Rollerblades
- Released: January 19, 2024
- Recorded: 2023
- Genre: Pop rock; folk rock
- Length: 3:01
- Label: Night Street; Warner
- Songwriters: Benson Boone; Jack LaFrantz; Evan Blair
- Producer: Evan Blair

Benson Boone singles chronology
"To Love Someone" (2023)	"Beautiful Things" (2024)	"Slow It Down" (2024)

Music video
- "Beautiful Things" on YouTube

"Beautiful Things" is a song by American singer and songwriter Benson Boone. It was released on January 19, 2024, through Night Street Records and Warner Records as the lead single of his debut studio album, Fireworks & Rollerblades (2024). The song was co-written by Boone with Jack LaFrantz and Evan Blair, and produced by the latter. "Beautiful Things" peaked at number two on the Billboard Hot 100. Outside of the United States, "Beautiful Things" topped the charts in 19 other countries, including Australia, Austria, Canada, France, Germany, Ireland, New Zealand, and the United Kingdom.

== Background ==
Benson Boone began writing the song on September 8, 2023, shortly after moving to Los Angeles. Initially beginning two different songs over two consecutive evenings, songwriter Jack LaFrantz suggested combining the two songs into one, which became "Beautiful Things". Boone cited a relationship he had recently begun as inspiration.

== Composition ==
"Beautiful Things" is a pop rock and folk rock "ballad about the meaning of life", where Boone reflects on gratitude for life, love and the "volatility of happiness".

The song adds a "more powerful" layer to the "softness" he exhibited with previous singles like "In the Stars", helping him bring out "all of his character" from inside and performing different "vocal turns". Consisting of "soulful verses" paired with a "powerful chorus", Boone showcases "raw, emotive vocals". It is in the key of B-flat major.

== Promotion ==
Starting on December 3, 2023, Boone steadily teased the song on TikTok and Instagram, amassing over 130 million views with its sound until January 18, 2024.

Boone performed the song live at the 67th Annual Grammy Awards on February 2, 2025.

== Music video ==
The music video premiered on the day after the single. It garnered half a million views within an hour. The video features Boone and his band performing on a mountaintop and was shot near St. George, Utah. As of May 9, 2026, the music video has amassed over a billion views. It was directed by Matt Eastin and won an MTV VMA for Best Alternative video.

== Accolades ==
Awards and Nominations for "Beautiful Things"
Organization	Year	Category	Result	Ref.
American Music Awards	2025	Song of the Year	Nominated	
American Music Awards	2025	Favorite Music Video	Nominated	
American Music Awards	2025	Favorite Pop Song	Nominated	
Billboard Music Awards	2024	Top Hot 100 Song	Nominated	
Billboard Music Awards	2024	Top Radio Song	Nominated	
Billboard Music Awards	2024	Top Selling Song	Nominated	
Billboard Music Awards	2024	Top Billboard Global 200 Song	Won	
Billboard Music Awards	2024	Top Billboard Global 200 (Excl. U.S.) Song	Won	
iHeartRadio Music Awards	2025	Song of the Year	Won	
iHeartRadio Music Awards	2025	Pop Song of the Year	Nominated	
iHeartRadio Music Awards	2025	Best Music Video	Nominated	
iHeartRadio Music Awards	2025	Best Lyrics	Nominated	
Los 40 Music Awards	2024	Best International Song	Won	
MTV Europe Music Awards	2024	Best Song	Nominated	
MTV Video Music Awards	2024	Best Alternative Video	Won	
MTV Video Music Awards	2024	Song of Summer	Nominated	
MTV Video Music Awards Japan	2025	Best New Artist Video (International)	Won	
Nickelodeon Kids' Choice Awards	2024	Favorite Viral Song	Nominated	
NRJ Music Award	2024	Best International Song	Won	

== Charts ==
=== Weekly charts ===
Weekly chart performance for "Beautiful Things"
Chart (2024–2026)	Peak position
Argentina Hot 100 (Billboard)	47
Argentina Airplay (Monitor Latino)	7
Australia (ARIA)	1
Austria (Ö3 Austria Top 40)	1
Belarus Airplay (TopHit)	2
Belgium (Ultratop 50 Flanders)	1
Belgium (Ultratop 50 Wallonia)	1
Bolivia (Billboard)	21
Bolivia Airplay (Monitor Latino)	3
Brazil Hot 100 (Billboard)	32
Bulgaria Airplay (PROPHON)	7
Canada Hot 100 (Billboard)	1
Canada AC (Billboard)	1
Canada CHR/Top 40 (Billboard)	1
Canada Hot AC (Billboard)	1
Central America Airplay (Monitor Latino)	15
Chile Airplay (Monitor Latino)	9
Colombia Anglo Airplay (Monitor Latino)	1
CIS Airplay (TopHit)	1
Costa Rica Airplay (Monitor Latino)	7
Croatia International Airplay (Top lista)	1
Czech Republic Airplay (ČNS IFPI)	1
Czech Republic Singles Digital (ČNS IFPI)	1
Denmark (Tracklisten)	3
Dominican Republic Anglo Airplay (Monitor Latino)	1
Ecuador (Billboard)	18
Ecuador Airplay (Monitor Latino)	16
El Salvador Anglo Airplay (Monitor Latino)	6
Estonia Airplay (TopHit)	1
Finland (Suomen virallinen lista)	34
France (SNEP)	1
Germany (GfK)	1
Global 200 (Billboard)	1
Greece International (IFPI)	4
Guatemala Anglo Airplay (Monitor Latino)	1
Honduras Anglo Airplay (Monitor Latino)	9
Hungary (Rádiós Top 40)	27
Hungary (Single Top 40)	10
Iceland (Tónlistinn)	2
India International (IMI)	19
Indonesia (Billboard)	22
Ireland (IRMA)	1
Israel (Mako Hitlist)	14
Italy (FIMI)	18
Japan Hot Overseas (Billboard Japan)	3
Kazakhstan Airplay (TopHit)	6
Latin America Anglo Airplay (Monitor Latino)	1
Latvia Airplay (LaIPA)	2
Latvia Streaming (LaIPA)	2
Lebanon (Lebanese Top 20)	4
Lithuania (AGATA)	5
Lithuania Airplay (TopHit)	3
Luxembourg (Billboard)	1
Malaysia (Billboard)	13
Malaysia International (RIM)	10
Malta Airplay (Radiomonitor)	1
Mexico Airplay (Monitor Latino)	13
Middle East and North Africa (IFPI)	6
Moldova Airplay (TopHit)	22
Netherlands (Dutch Top 40)	2
Netherlands (Single Top 100)	2
New Zealand (Recorded Music NZ)	1
Nicaragua Anglo Airplay (Monitor Latino)	3
Nigeria (TurnTable Top 100)	79
Norway (VG-lista)	1
Panama International (PRODUCE)	16
Panama Airplay (Monitor Latino)	8
Paraguay Airplay (Monitor Latino)	1
Peru (Billboard)	20
Peru Airplay (Monitor Latino)	13
Philippines Hot 100 (Billboard Philippines)	68
Poland Airplay (OLiS)	27
Poland Streaming (OLiS)	4
Portugal (AFP)	1
Puerto Rico Anglo Airplay (Monitor Latino)	1
Romania (Billboard)	23
Romania Airplay (UPFR)	2
Romania Airplay (Media Forest)	1
Romania TV Airplay (Media Forest)	4
Russia Airplay (TopHit)	4
San Marino Airplay (SMRTV Top 50)	25
Serbia Airplay (Radiomonitor)	19
Singapore (RIAS)	10
Slovakia Airplay (ČNS IFPI)	5
Slovakia Singles Digital (ČNS IFPI)	1
South Africa Streaming (TOSAC)	2
South Korea (Circle)	78
Spain (Promusicae)	14
Sweden (Sverigetopplistan)	3
Switzerland (Schweizer Hitparade)	1
Ukraine Airplay (TopHit)	34
United Arab Emirates (IFPI)	4
UK Singles (Official Charts)	1
Uruguay Airplay (Monitor Latino)	9
US Billboard Hot 100	2
US Adult Contemporary (Billboard)	1
US Adult Pop Airplay (Billboard)	1
US Dance Airplay (Billboard)	26
US Pop Airplay (Billboard)	1
US Rock & Alternative Airplay (Billboard)	31
Venezuela Airplay (Record Report)	31

=== Monthly charts ===
Monthly chart performance for "Beautiful Things"
Chart (2024–2026)	Peak position
Belarus Airplay (TopHit)	2
Brazil Streaming (Pro-Música Brasil)	38
CIS Airplay (TopHit)	1
Czech Republic (Rádio – Top 100)	1
Czech Republic (Singles Digitál – Top 100)	1
Estonia Airplay (TopHit)	1
Kazakhstan Airplay (TopHit)	4
Lithuania Airplay (TopHit)	5
Moldova Airplay (TopHit)	73
Panama Streaming (PRODUCE)	183
Romania Airplay (TopHit)	1
Russia Airplay (TopHit)	3
Slovakia (Rádio – Top 100)	6
South Korea (Circle)	114
Ukraine Airplay (TopHit)	47

=== Year-end charts ===
2024 year-end chart performance for "Beautiful Things"
Chart (2024)	Position
Australia (ARIA)	1
Austria (Ö3 Austria Top 40)	1
Belarus Airplay (TopHit)	16
Belgium (Ultratop 50 Flanders)	1
Belgium (Ultratop 50 Wallonia)	1
Canada (Canadian Hot 100)	2
CIS Airplay (TopHit)	1
Denmark (Tracklisten)	8
Estonia Airplay (TopHit)	6
France (SNEP)	4
Germany (GfK)	3
Global 200 (Billboard)	1
Global Singles (IFPI)	1
Hungary (Single Top 40)	43
Iceland (Tónlistinn)	1
Israel (Mako Hitlist)	35
Italy (FIMI)	21
Kazakhstan Airplay (TopHit)	25
Lithuania Airplay (TopHit)	2
Netherlands (Dutch Top 40)	14
Netherlands (Single Top 100)	5
New Zealand (Recorded Music NZ)	2
Poland (Polish Streaming Top 100)	15
Portugal (AFP)	2
Romania Airplay (TopHit)	3
Russia Airplay (TopHit)	18
South Africa (TOSAC)	2
South Korea (Circle)	126
Spain (Promusicae)	32
Spain Airplay (Promusicae)	1
Sweden (Sverigetopplistan)	2
Switzerland (Schweizer Hitparade)	1
UK Singles (OCC)	2
US Billboard Hot 100	3
US Adult Contemporary (Billboard)	9
US Adult Top 40 (Billboard)	2
US Mainstream Top 40 (Billboard)	4
Venezuela Anglo (Record Report)	2

2025 year-end chart performance for "Beautiful Things"
Chart (2025)	Position
Argentina Anglo Airplay (Monitor Latino)	11
Australia (ARIA)	7
Austria (Ö3 Austria Top 40)	12
Belarus Airplay (TopHit)	32
Belgium (Ultratop 50 Flanders)	40
Belgium (Ultratop 50 Wallonia)	32
Bolivia Airplay (Monitor Latino)	69
Canada (Canadian Hot 100)	5
Canada AC (Billboard)	5
Canada Hot AC (Billboard)	17
Chile Airplay (Monitor Latino)	73
CIS Airplay (TopHit)	52
Estonia Airplay (TopHit)	71
France (SNEP)	36
Germany (GfK)	21
Global 200 (Billboard)	5
Hungary (Single Top 40)	68
Iceland (Tónlistinn)	36
Italy (FIMI)	59
Lithuania Airplay (TopHit)	23
Netherlands (Single Top 100)	29
New Zealand (Recorded Music NZ)	21
Poland (Polish Streaming Top 100)	66
Romania Airplay (TopHit)	53
South Korea (Circle)	161
Sweden (Sverigetopplistan)	26
Switzerland (Schweizer Hitparade)	5
UK Singles (OCC)	7
US Billboard Hot 100	6
US Adult Contemporary (Billboard)	2
US Adult Pop Airplay (Billboard)	14
US Pop Airplay (Billboard)	18

== Certifications ==
Certifications for "Beautiful Things"
Region	Certification	Certified units/sales
Australia (ARIA)	12× Platinum	840,000^{‡}
Austria (IFPI Austria)	4× Platinum	120,000^{‡}
Belgium (BRMA)	3× Platinum	120,000^{‡}
Canada (Music Canada)	Diamond	800,000^{‡}
Denmark (IFPI Danmark)	3× Platinum	270,000^{‡}
France (SNEP)	Diamond	333,333^{‡}
Germany (BVMI)	Platinum	600,000^{‡}
Italy (FIMI)	2× Platinum	200,000^{‡}
Mexico (AMPROFON)	2× Platinum+Gold	350,000^{‡}
Netherlands (NVPI)	Platinum	93,000^{‡}
New Zealand (RMNZ)	8× Platinum	240,000^{‡}
Poland (ZPAV)	Diamond	250,000^{‡}
Portugal (AFP)	7× Platinum	70,000^{‡}
Spain (Promusicae)	3× Platinum	180,000^{‡}
Switzerland (IFPI Switzerland)	4× Platinum	120,000^{‡}
United Kingdom (BPI)	5× Platinum	3,000,000^{‡}
United States (RIAA)	Diamond	10,000,000^{‡}
Streaming
Czech Republic (ČNS IFPI)	Platinum	5,000,000
Greece (IFPI Greece)	3× Platinum	6,000,000^{†}
Japan (RIAJ)	Gold	50,000,000^{†}
Summary
Worldwide	—	2,110,000,000
^{‡} Sales+streaming figures based on certification alone.^{†} Streaming-only figures based on certification alone.

== Release history ==
Release dates and formats for "Beautiful Things"
Region	Date	Format	Label(s)	Ref.
United States	January 30, 2024	Contemporary hit radio	Night Street; Warner	

== See also ==
- List of highest-certified singles in Australia
