= Little More Time =

2026 single by Niall Horan

Single by Niall Horan

from the album Dinner Party
- Released: 23 April 2026
- Length: 3:38
- Label: Capitol
- Songwriters: Niall Horan; Ian Franzino; Andrew Haas; Rocky Block; Steph Jones
- Producers: Afterhrs; John Ryan; Julian Bunetta

Niall Horan singles chronology
"Dinner Party" (2026)	"Little More Time" (2026)	"End of an Era" (2026)

Music video
- "Little More Time (Seaside Visual)" on YouTube

"Little More Time" is a song by Irish singer-songwriter Niall Horan, released on 23 April 2026 through Capitol Records as the second single from his fourth studio album, Dinner Party.

== Background ==
The single was written by Horan himself, along with Afterhrs (Ian Franzino, Andrew Haas), Rocky Block, and Steph Jones. About the single, Horan said, "'Little More Time' is a song about wanting time to stand still. If you could just press pause and the world would stop yet you could still live within the world like no one was watching. I spend a lot of time away from home. So having found roots and wanting to be at home more, I felt compelled to write a song about the smaller moments and wishing that you could just stay in them."

== Reception ==
Megan Parkinson of Melodic Magazine describes the song as "somewhere between soft pop and that slightly folk-tinged, easy-listening space he's made his own." Parkinson continues, "There's something about the way he stretches out the melodies that makes everything feel a bit slower, a bit softer, with a chorus that is earworm-y too."

Nmesoma Okechukwu of Euphoria described "Little More Time" as having "a calm and nostalgic vibe." Jazmin Williams from The Honey Pop says the song is "soft, reflective, and deeply personal", while it also "feels like something more than a song, but a universal feeling we’ve all experienced at some point. That quiet, almost aching wish to stay exactly where you are for just a second longer."

== Charts ==
=== Weekly charts ===
Weekly chart performance
Chart (2026)	Peak position
Czech Republic Airplay (ČNS IFPI)	21
Ireland Homegrown (Official Charts)	5
