= Ghost Town (Benson Boone song) =

Single by Benson Boone

from the EP Walk Me Home... and the album Fireworks & Rollerblades
- Released: October 15, 2021
- Genre: Pop
- Length: 3:14
- Label: Night Street, Warner
- Songwriters: Benson Boone; JT Daly; Nolan Sipe; Tushar Apte
- Producer: JT Daly

Benson Boone singles chronology
"Ghost Town" (2021)	"Room for 2" (2022)

"Ghost Town" is the debut single by American singer and songwriter Benson Boone, released on October 15, 2021, through Night Street Records. It was co-written by Boone with JT Daly, Nolan Sipe and Tushar Apte, and produced by Daly. It reached number one in Norway, the top 10 in Denmark and top 20 in Sweden. It was certified Gold by the RIAA on June 8, 2022.

The song was included on Boone's debut album, Fireworks & Rollerblades.

== Background ==
Benson Boone has been called a "TikTok star", having over 2 million followers on the platform. He appeared on season 19 of American Idol in early 2021, where he won a golden ticket to Hollywood, but left because he felt the show was "not right" for him. Following this, he signed with Dan Reynolds' Warner Records label Night Street Records and released "Ghost Town".

== Critical reception ==
Joe Lynch of Billboard called the song an "elegant, lonely piano ballad that shows off [Boone's] robust yet restrained vocals and knack for melodic detail".

== Personnel ==
- Benson Boone – lead vocals, songwriting, piano, drums
- JT Daly – songwriting, production, engineering, electric guitar, organ, acoustic guitar, drums
- Josh Lovell - engineering, acoustic guitar
- Nolan Sipe – songwriting
- Tushar Apte – songwriting
- Julie Melucci – acoustic guitar
- Chad Howat – piano
- Serban Ghenea – mixing
- John Hanes – mix engineering
- Randy Merrill – mastering

== Charts ==
=== Weekly charts ===
Weekly chart performance for "Ghost Town"
Chart (2021–2022)	Peak position
Australia (ARIA)	67
Belgium (Ultratop 50 Flanders)	23
Belgium (Ultratop 50 Wallonia)	5
Canada Hot 100 (Billboard)	53
Canada CHR/Top 40 (Billboard)	47
Denmark (Tracklisten)	10
Finland Airplay (Radiosoittolista)	9
France (SNEP)	92
Global 200 (Billboard)	79
Iceland (Tónlistinn)	30
Ireland (IRMA)	29
Netherlands (Dutch Top 40)	20
Netherlands (Single Top 100)	34
New Zealand (Recorded Music NZ)	39
Norway (VG-lista)	1
South Korea (Circle)	80
Sweden (Sverigetopplistan)	17
Switzerland (Schweizer Hitparade)	76
UK Singles (Official Charts)	46
US Billboard Hot 100	100
US Adult Contemporary (Billboard)	28
US Adult Pop Airplay (Billboard)	12
US Pop Airplay (Billboard)	24

=== Year-end charts ===
2022 year-end chart performance for "Ghost Town"
Chart (2022)	Position
Belgium (Ultratop 50 Flanders)	75
Belgium (Ultratop 50 Wallonia)	25
Denmark (Tracklisten)	34
Netherlands (Dutch Top 40)	74
US Adult Top 40 (Billboard)	36

== Certifications ==
Certifications for "Ghost Town"
Region	Certification	Certified units/sales
Austria (IFPI Austria)	Gold	15,000^{‡}
Canada (Music Canada)	3× Platinum	240,000^{‡}
Denmark (IFPI Danmark)	2× Platinum	180,000^{‡}
France (SNEP)	Platinum	200,000^{‡}
Netherlands (NVPI)	Gold	40,000^{‡}
New Zealand (RMNZ)	2× Platinum	60,000^{‡}
Norway (IFPI Norway)	Platinum	60,000^{‡}
Spain (Promusicae)	Gold	30,000^{‡}
Switzerland (IFPI Switzerland)	Platinum	20,000^{‡}
United Kingdom (BPI)	Platinum	600,000^{‡}
United States (RIAA)	Platinum	1,000,000^{‡}
^{‡} Sales+streaming figures based on certification alone.

== Release history ==
Release history for "Ghost Town"
Region	Date	Format	Label	Ref.
Various	October 15, 2021	Digital download; streaming	Night Street	
Italy	November 12, 2021	Contemporary hit radio	Warner	
United States	November 29, 2021	Adult contemporary radio	Night Street; Warner	
