= Fireworks & Rollerblades =

Studio album by Benson Boone
- Released: April 5, 2024
- Genre: Pop rock
- Length: 49:09
- Labels: Night Street; Warner
- Producers: Evan Blair; Captain Cuts; JT Daly; Jason Evigan; Dan Farber; David Hodges; Malay; Connor McDonough; Riley McDonough; Imad Royal; Steven Solomon; Jason Suwito; TMS

Benson Boone chronology
Pulse (2023)	Fireworks & Rollerblades (2024)	American Heart (2025)

Singles from Fireworks & Rollerblades
- 1. "Beautiful Things" Released: January 18, 2024; 2. "Slow It Down" Released: March 22, 2024; 3. "Pretty Slowly" Released: August 15, 2024

Fireworks & Rollerblades is the debut studio album by American singer-songwriter Benson Boone. It was released on April 5, 2024, through Night Street and Warner Records. The album debuted at number one in Norway and in the top five in New Zealand.

== Background and promotion ==
On March 3, 2023, alongside the release of the single "Sugar Sweet", Boone revealed that his debut studio album was "coming" but did not say when exactly although it was then expected to be released in 2023. The lead single "Beautiful Things" was released on January 18, 2024, and became an instant commercial success, reaching number two on the Billboard Hot 100 and number one on the UK Singles Chart. An accompanying tour called the Fireworks & Rollerblades Tour was announced on January 26 and ran from April to May 2024 through North America, then continuing in Europe, the United Kingdom and Australia. On March 21, the singer announced his debut studio album Fireworks & Rollerblades and released the second single "Slow It Down", an "aching, piano-driven number". The song features his "unmistakable style" and was seen as a "demonstration" that Boone had found his niche.

== Critical reception ==
Marcy Donelson of AllMusic writes, "Beautiful Things's theatrical, rock-injected, arena-ready pop is surprisingly representative of the 15-track Fireworks & Rollerblades, an album flush with full-throated (sometimes strained) belting, earnest affirmations, self-doubt, and good relationship intentions."

Professional ratings
Review scores
Source	Rating
AllMusic	3/5 stars

== Commercial performance ==
In its first week of release, the album earned 58,000 album equivalent units in the U.S., debuting at number six on the Billboard 200.

== Track listing ==
Fireworks & Rollerblades track listing
No.	Title	Writer(s)	Producer(s)	Length
1.	"Intro"	Benson Boone; Jack LaFrantz; Jason Suwito	Suwito	1:02
2.	"Be Someone"	Boone; LaFrantz; Suwito	Suwito	3:44
3.	"Slow It Down"	Boone; Jason Evigan; Connor McDonough; Riley McDonough; LaFrantz	Evigan; C. McDonough; R. McDonough	2:41
4.	"Beautiful Things"	Boone; LaFrantz; Evan Blair	Blair	3:00
5.	"Cry"	Boone; LaFrantz; Malay	Malay	3:06
6.	"Forever and a Day"	Boone; LaFrantz; Suwito	Suwito	3:45
7.	"In the Stars"	Boone; Evigan; Michael Pollack	Evigan^{[p]}; Pollack^{[a]}; Lionel Crasta^{[v]}; Jackson Rau^{[v]}	3:36
8.	"Drunk in My Mind"	Boone; LaFrantz; Suwito	Suwito	3:47
9.	"My Greatest Fear"	Boone; Imad Royal; Nolan Sipe	Royal^{[p]}; Rayman on the Beat	3:33
10.	"There She Goes"	Boone; Ben Berger; Ryan Rabin	Captain Cuts	3:24
11.	"Hello Love"	Boone; LaFrantz; TMS	TMS	3:28
12.	"Ghost Town"	Boone; JT Daly; Sipe; Tushar Apte	Daly	3:13
13.	"Love of Mine"	Boone; David Hodges; Steven Solomon	Hodges; Solomon^{[p]}	3:22
14.	"Friend"	Boone; Farber; LaFrantz; Jon Levine; Michael Matosic	Farber; Levine	3:10
15.	"What Do You Want"	Boone; Castle; Andrew Jackson; Suwito	Suwito	4:18
Total length:				49:09

Fireworks & Rollerblades – Japanese CD edition (bonus tracks)
No.	Title	Length
16.	"Sugar Sweet"
17.	"To Love Someone"

Fireworks & Rollerblades – reissue bonus track
No.	Title	Writer(s)	Producer(s)	Length
15.	"Pretty Slowly"	Boone; Evan Blair; Jack LaFrantz	Blair	4:22
Total length:				53:31

Notes

- ^{p} signifies a primary and vocal producer.
- ^{a} signifies an additional producer.
- ^{v} signifies a vocal producer.

== Personnel ==
Musicians

- Benson Boone – lead vocals (all tracks), piano (tracks 1, 2, 5, 6, 8–13, 15), background vocals (5, 8, 9, 11, 13)
- Jason Suwito – bass, drums, guitar, keyboards, programming, synthesizer (tracks 1, 2, 6, 8, 15); background vocals (8), piano (8)
- Jason Evigan – all instruments (track 3), programming (track 3, 7), background vocals, drums, guitar (track 7)
- Connor McDonough – all instruments, programming (track 3)
- Riley McDonough – all instruments, programming (track 3)
- Malay – bass, guitar, piano, programming (track 5)
- Jack LaFrantz – background vocals (tracks 5, 11),
- John Garrison – bass guitar (track 11)
- Aaron Steele – drums (track 5)
- Michael Pollack – background vocals, keyboards (track 7)
- Imad Royal – bass, drums, guitar, programming (track 9)
- Ryan Rabin – drums (track 10)
- Ben Berger – keyboards, programming (track 10)
- Michael Kammerman – guitar, programming (track 10)
- Peter Kelleher – background vocals, synthesizer (track 11)
- Tom Barnes – drums (track 11)
- Benjamin Kohn – guitar (track 11)
- JT Daly – acoustic guitar, electric guitar, organ (track 12)
- Josh Lovell – acoustic guitar (track 12)
- Julie Melucci – acoustic guitar (track 12)
- Chad Howat – piano (track 12)
- Steven Solomon – background vocals, guitar, programming (track 13)
- David Hodges – keyboards (track 13)
- Dan Farber – drums, guitar, programming (track 14)
- Jon Levine – drums, piano, programming (track 14)

Technical

- Randy Merrill – mastering (tracks 1, 2, 4–15)
- Idania Valencia – mastering (track 3)
- Serban Ghenea – mixing (tracks 1, 2, 7, 12)
- Alex Ghenea – mixing (tracks 3, 4, 10, 15)
- Mitch McCarthy – mixing (tracks 5, 8, 9, 11)
- Michael Freeman – mixing (track 6)
- David Hodges – mixing (track 13)
- Jason Suwito – engineering (tracks 1, 2, 6, 8, 15)
- Evan Blair – engineering (track 4)
- Malay – engineering (track 5)
- Rafael "Come2Brazil" Fadul – engineering (track 7)
- Imad Royal – engineering (track 9)
- Rayman on the Beat – engineering (track 9)
- Ed McIntee – engineering (track 10)
- Chris Bishop – engineering, vocal engineering (track 11)
- JT Daly – engineering (track 12)
- Josh Lovell – engineering (track 12)
- Steven Solomon – engineering (track 13)
- Jon Levine – engineering (track 14)
- John Hanes – mix engineering (track 12)
- Bryce Bordone – mixing assistance (tracks 1, 2)
- Eli Heisler – mixing assistance (track 14)
- Ruby Smith – mixing assistance (track 14)
- Brad Ritchie – engineering assistance (track 10)

== Charts ==
=== Weekly charts ===
Weekly chart performance for Fireworks & Rollerblades
Chart (2024)	Peak position
Australian Albums (ARIA)	17
Austrian Albums (Ö3 Austria)	7
Belgian Albums (Ultratop Flanders)	5
Belgian Albums (Ultratop Wallonia)	14
Canadian Albums (Billboard)	5
Czech Albums (ČNS IFPI)	3
Danish Albums (Hitlisten)	13
Dutch Albums (Album Top 100)	2
Finnish Albums (Suomen virallinen lista)	10
French Albums (SNEP)	7
German Albums (Offizielle Top 100)	20
Hungarian Albums (MAHASZ)	30
Icelandic Albums (Tónlistinn)	25
Irish Albums (Official Charts)	15
Italian Albums (FIMI)	17
Lithuanian Albums (AGATA)	6
New Zealand Albums (RMNZ)	5
Norwegian Albums (VG-lista)	1
Polish Albums (ZPAV)	13
Portuguese Albums (AFP)	17
Scottish Albums (Official Charts)	21
Slovak Albums (ČNS IFPI)	7
Spanish Albums (Promusicae)	38
Swedish Albums (Sverigetopplistan)	7
Swiss Albums (Schweizer Hitparade)	6
UK Albums (Official Charts)	16
US Billboard 200	6

=== Year-end charts ===
2024 year-end chart performance for Fireworks & Rollerblades
Chart (2024)	Position
Australian Albums (ARIA)	66
Belgian Albums (Ultratop Flanders)	18
Belgian Albums (Ultratop Wallonia)	65
Canadian Albums (Billboard)	24
Czech Albums (ČNS IFPI)	8
Danish Albums (Hitlisten)	53
Dutch Albums (Album Top 100)	4
French Albums (SNEP)	37
German Albums (Offizielle Top 100)	65
Global Albums (IFPI)	16
Hungarian Albums (MAHASZ)	92
Icelandic Albums (Tónlistinn)	59
Italian Albums (FIMI)	77
New Zealand Albums (RMNZ)	25
Portuguese Albums (AFP)	100
Slovak Albums (ČNS IFPI)	7
Swedish Albums (Sverigetopplistan)	17
Swiss Albums (Schweizer Hitparade)	55
UK Albums (OCC)	55
US Billboard 200	49

2025 year-end chart performance for Fireworks & Rollerblades
Chart (2025)	Position
Australian Albums (ARIA)	57
Belgian Albums (Ultratop Flanders)	27
Belgian Albums (Ultratop Wallonia)	48
Canadian Albums (Billboard)	21
Dutch Albums (Album Top 100)	16
French Albums (SNEP)	45
Icelandic Albums (Tónlistinn)	89
New Zealand Albums (RMNZ)	20
Swedish Albums (Sverigetopplistan)	28
Swiss Albums (Schweizer Hitparade)	78
UK Albums (OCC)	37
US Billboard 200	27

== Certifications ==
Certifications for Fireworks & Rollerblades
Region	Certification	Certified units/sales
Austria (IFPI Austria)	Gold	7,500^{‡}
Canada (Music Canada)	4× Platinum	320,000^{‡}
Denmark (IFPI Danmark)	Platinum	20,000^{‡}
France (SNEP)	Platinum	100,000^{‡}
Italy (FIMI)	Platinum	50,000^{‡}
New Zealand (RMNZ)	3× Platinum	45,000^{‡}
Poland (ZPAV)	Platinum	20,000^{‡}
Portugal (AFP)	Gold	3,500^{‡}
Spain (Promusicae)	Gold	20,000^{‡}
Switzerland (IFPI Switzerland)	Gold	10,000^{‡}
United Kingdom (BPI)	Platinum	300,000^{‡}
United States (RIAA)	2× Platinum	2,000,000^{‡}
^{‡} Sales+streaming figures based on certification alone.

== Release history ==
Release dates and formats for Fireworks & Rollerblades
Region	Date	Format(s)	Label	Ref.
Various	April 5, 2024	LP; digital download; streaming	Night Street; Warner	
Europe	April 12, 2024	CD	Warner	
Australia	April 26, 2024	CD	Warner	
Canada	April 26, 2024	CD	Warner	
United States	April 26, 2024	CD	Warner	
