= Slow It Down (Benson Boone song) =

Single by Benson Boone

from the album Fireworks & Rollerblades
- Released: March 21, 2024
- Recorded: December 29, 2023
- Genre: Pop rock
- Length: 2:42
- Label: Night Street; Warner
- Songwriters: Benson Boone; Jack LaFrantz; Jason Evigan; Connor McDonough; Riley McDonough
- Producers: Jason Evigan; Connor McDonough; Riley McDonough

Benson Boone singles chronology
"Beautiful Things" (2024)	"Slow It Down" (2024)	"Pretty Slowly" (2024)

Music video
- "Slow It Down" on YouTube

"Slow It Down" is a song by American singer and songwriter Benson Boone. It was released on March 21, 2024, as the second single from his debut studio album, Fireworks & Rollerblades (2024). The song peaked in the top twenty in several countries, including Ireland, Norway, New Zealand and the United Kingdom.

== Composition ==
"Slow It Down" has a tempo of 181 BPM but can also be played at half-time at 91 BPM. The track is 2 minutes and 42 seconds long, written in the key of A-flat major, and follows a 4/4 time signature. The song features a contrast between a "mournful" piano intro and an uplifting, "sparkly" chorus that addresses racing thoughts and relationship anxiety. Its lyrics include vulnerability, overthinking, and trying to calm a partner's fast-moving world.

== Charts ==
=== Weekly charts ===
Weekly chart performance for "Slow It Down"
Chart (2024–2025)	Peak position
Australia (ARIA)	21
Austria (Ö3 Austria Top 40)	27
Belgium (Ultratop 50 Flanders)	20
Belgium (Ultratop 50 Wallonia)	7
Canada Hot 100 (Billboard)	19
Canada CHR/Top 40 (Billboard)	5
CIS Airplay (TopHit)	74
Czech Republic Singles Digital (ČNS IFPI)	60
Estonia Airplay (TopHit)	12
France (SNEP)	81
Germany (GfK)	90
Global 200 (Billboard)	23
Iceland (Tónlistinn)	40
Ireland (IRMA)	15
Latvia Airplay (LaIPA)	16
Lebanon English Airplay (Lebanese Top 20)	13
Lithuania Airplay (TopHit)	46
Netherlands (Dutch Top 40)	17
Netherlands (Single Top 100)	32
New Zealand (Recorded Music NZ)	18
Norway (VG-lista)	14
Portugal (AFP)	93
Romania Airplay (TopHit)	160
Slovakia Singles Digital (ČNS IFPI)	93
South Africa (Billboard)	22
Sweden (Sverigetopplistan)	39
Switzerland (Schweizer Hitparade)	27
UK Singles (Official Charts)	14
US Billboard Hot 100	32
US Adult Contemporary (Billboard)	18
US Adult Pop Airplay (Billboard)	9
US Pop Airplay (Billboard)	11
Venezuela Airplay (Record Report)	52

=== Monthly charts ===
Monthly chart performance for "Slow It Down"
Chart (2024)	Position
CIS Airplay (TopHit)	84
Czech Republic (Singles Digitál – Top 100)	68
Estonia Airplay (TopHit)	19

=== Year-end charts ===
2024 year-end chart performance for "Slow It Down"
Chart (2024)	Position
Australia (ARIA)	33
Belgium (Ultratop 50 Flanders)	57
Belgium (Ultratop 50 Wallonia)	39
Canada (Canadian Hot 100)	31
Estonia Airplay (TopHit)	43
Global 200 (Billboard)	103
Netherlands (Dutch Top 40)	73
Netherlands (Single Top 100)	50
New Zealand (Recorded Music NZ)	33
Portugal (AFP)	185
Switzerland (Schweizer Hitparade)	52
UK Singles (OCC)	31
US Billboard Hot 100	41
US Adult Top 40 (Billboard)	29
US Mainstream Top 40 (Billboard)	34

2025 year-end chart performance for "Slow It Down"
Chart (2025)	Position
Australia (ARIA)	55
Belgium (Ultratop 50 Wallonia)	197
Canada (Canadian Hot 100)	100
Estonia Airplay (TopHit)	116
Global 200 (Billboard)	167
New Zealand (Recorded Music NZ)	45
UK Singles (OCC)	93

== Certifications ==
Certifications for "Slow It Down"
Region	Certification	Certified units/sales
Australia (ARIA)	5× Platinum	350,000^{‡}
Austria (IFPI Austria)	Platinum	30,000^{‡}
Belgium (BRMA)	Platinum	40,000^{‡}
Canada (Music Canada)	2× Platinum	160,000^{‡}
Denmark (IFPI Danmark)	Gold	45,000^{‡}
France (SNEP)	Platinum	200,000^{‡}
New Zealand (RMNZ)	3× Platinum	90,000^{‡}
Poland (ZPAV)	Gold	25,000^{‡}
Portugal (AFP)	2× Platinum	50,000^{‡}
Spain (Promusicae)	Gold	30,000^{‡}
United Kingdom (BPI)	2× Platinum	1,200,000^{‡}
United States (RIAA)	2× Platinum	2,000,000^{‡}
^{‡} Sales+streaming figures based on certification alone.
