= Dinner Party (song) =

2026 single by Niall Horan

Single by Niall Horan

from the album Dinner Party
- Released: 20 March 2026
- Length: 2:34
- Label: Capitol
- Songwriters: Niall Horan; John Ryan; Julian Bunetta; Ian Franzino; Andrew Haas; Jamie Scott
- Producers: John Ryan; Julian Bunetta; Afterhrs

Niall Horan singles chronology
"Drive Safe" (2026)	"Dinner Party" (2026)	"Little More Time" (2026)

Music video
- "Dinner Party (Golden Hour Visual)" on YouTube

"Dinner Party" is a song by Irish singer-songwriter Niall Horan, released on 20 March 2026 through Capitol Records as the lead single from his fourth studio album, Dinner Party.

== Background ==
The single was written by Horan himself, along with John Ryan, Jamie Scott, Afterhrs (Ian Franzino, Andrew Haas), and Julian Bunetta. Horan said about the record, "Dinner Party is a thank you to the past and a hello to the present, covering the big life events and the small, sometimes messy, in-between moments that actually make them up. Much of the album explores that tug of war between falling in love while being terrified of losing them and how that risk is actually the best part. There's love, intimacy, fear, loss, hope, dreams—all wrapped together across it."

== Reception ==
Robin Murray from Clash said, "Soft hued indie pop with a slick chorus and relatable lyricism, Niall Horan’s loved-up phase quietly blossoms with vernal energy on this assured, steady Equinox release."

Noah Wade from Euphoria said, "While selections from The Show were similarly dedicated to Woolley, this track sees Horan definitively settled into his current stage of life. His satisfaction and assuredness bleed into both his vocal performance, as he leans further into the bright theatrical flair he has touched on in prior work, as well as the sunshine and flowers-riddled visualizer for the track."

Pavel Snapkou of Showbiz by PS admits that "Dinner Party" "might not be the most striking introduction" to the album and could be "a bit of a spoiler for what’s to come — you can already sketch the rest of the record in your head." On the other hand, Snapkou assures "none of that takes away from the fact that this is a genuinely pleasant track, one that will easily find its place on the radio."

== Charts ==
=== Weekly charts ===
Weekly chart performance
Chart (2026)	Peak position
Belgium (Ultratop 50 Flanders)	36
Canada Hot 100 (Billboard)	89
Croatia International Airplay (Top lista)	89
Germany Airplay (BVMI)	93
Guatemala Anglo Airplay (Monitor Latino)	15
Ireland (IRMA)	36
Japan Hot Overseas (Billboard Japan)	6
Lithuania Airplay (TopHit)	91
Netherlands Airplay (Radiomonitor)	29
UK Singles (Official Charts)	72
UK Airplay (Radiomonitor)	19

=== Monthly charts ===
Monthly chart performance
Chart (2026)	Peak position
Lithuania Airplay (TopHit)	95
