= Pretty Slowly =

2024 single by Benson Boone

Single by Benson Boone

from the album Fireworks & Rollerblades
- Released: August 15, 2024
- Recorded: May 5, 2024
- Genre: Folk rock
- Length: 4:22
- Label: Night Street; Warner
- Songwriters: Boone; Evan Blair; Jack LaFrantz
- Producer: Evan Blair

Benson Boone singles chronology
"Slow It Down" (2024)	"Pretty Slowly" (2024)	"Sorry I'm Here for Someone Else" (2025)

Music video
- "Pretty Slowly" on YouTube

"Pretty Slowly" is a song by American singer Benson Boone, released on August 15, 2024. It was written by Boone himself, along with the producer Evan Blair and Jack LaFrantz.

== Background ==
Prior to releasing it, Benson Boone teased the song on the video-sharing platform TikTok.

== Composition ==
"Pretty Slowly" is a folk rock song in which Benson Boone reflects on a romantic relationship that ended in breakup, over an instrumental composed of piano and guitar. He reminisces the positive moments of his relationship in the first verse, and reveals in the chorus that his troubled past drove his partner to leave him. In the second verse, he admits she had legitimate reasons for doing so.

== Charts ==
Chart performance for "Pretty Slowly"
Chart (2024–2025)	Peak position
Canada Hot 100 (Billboard)	87
Global 200 (Billboard)	190
Ireland (IRMA)	85
Latvia Airplay (LAIPA)	20
New Zealand Hot Singles (RMNZ)	3
San Marino (SMRRTV Top 50)	40
Sweden Heatseeker (Sverigetopplistan)	14
UK Singles (Official Charts)	43
US Billboard Hot 100	86

== Certifications ==
Certifications for "Pretty Slowly"
Region	Certification	Certified units/sales
New Zealand (RMNZ)	Platinum	30,000^{‡}
United Kingdom (BPI)	Gold	400,000^{‡}
United States (RIAA)	Gold	500,000^{‡}
^{‡} Sales+streaming figures based on certification alone.
