= Medusa (Cameron Whitcomb song) =

2024 single by Canadian singer-songwriter Cameron Whitcomb

Single by Cameron Whitcomb

from the album The Hard Way
- Released: November 8, 2024
- Genre: Folk-pop; alternative country
- Length: 2:37
- Label: Atlantic
- Songwriters: Cameron Whitcomb; Cal Shapiro; Jack Riley
- Producer: Jack Riley

Cameron Whitcomb singles chronology
"Quitter" (2024)	"Medusa" (2024)	"Options" (2025)

Lyric video
- "Medusa" on YouTube

"Medusa" is a song recorded by Canadian singer-songwriter Cameron Whitcomb. He wrote the track with Cal Shapiro and Jack Riley, the latter of whom produced it. It was included on his 2025 debut album, The Hard Way.

== Background ==
In an interview, Whitcomb remarked that he wanted the song to be "up to the listener" to take what they need from it. He stated that it was initially about some of his struggles with addiction, noting how "you always regret it and you always feel so sick for the next few weeks or days after that. But it's like you do it knowing the repercussions. But there's this appeal of nothing else matters". Whitcomb added that he was dealing with a "pretty heavy breakup" at the time, where it was "the right person at the wrong time" and "really hurt, especially being sober," which is what the song is about to him.

== Track listings ==
Digital download – single

1. "Medusa" – 2:37

Digital download – single

1. "Medusa" (acoustic) – 3:03
2. "Medusa" – 2:37

== Charts ==
=== Weekly charts ===
Weekly chart performance for "Medusa"
Chart (2025)	Peak position
Australia Country Hot 50 (The Music)	24
Belgium (Ultratop 50 Flanders)	5
Belgium (Ultratop 50 Wallonia)	16
Canada (Canadian Hot 100)	63
Croatia International Airplay (Top lista)	26
Ireland (IRMA)	93
Lithuania Airplay (TopHit)	47
Netherlands (Dutch Top 40)	5
Netherlands (Single Top 100)	44
Norway (IFPI Norge)	29
Norway Airplay (IFPI Norge)	1
Serbia Airplay (Radiomonitor)	14
Sweden (Sverigetopplistan)	53
UK Country Airplay (Radiomonitor)	23
US Hot Rock & Alternative Songs (Billboard)	29

=== Monthly charts ===
Monthly chart performance for "Medusa"
Chart (2025)	Peak position
Lithuania Airplay (TopHit)	54

=== Year-end charts ===
Year-end chart performance for "Medusa"
Chart (2025)	Position
Belgium (Ultratop 50 Flanders)	8
Belgium (Ultratop 50 Wallonia)	42
Netherlands (Dutch Top 40)	32
US Hot Rock & Alternative Songs (Billboard)	82

== Certifications ==
Certificatons for "Medusa"
Region	Certification	Certified units/sales
Australia (ARIA)	Gold	35,000^{‡}
Canada (Music Canada)	2× Platinum	160,000^{‡}
Netherlands (NVPI)	Gold	46,500^{‡}
New Zealand (RMNZ)	Gold	15,000^{‡}
^{‡} Sales+streaming figures based on certification alone.
