= Nolan Sipe =

American songwriter and record producer

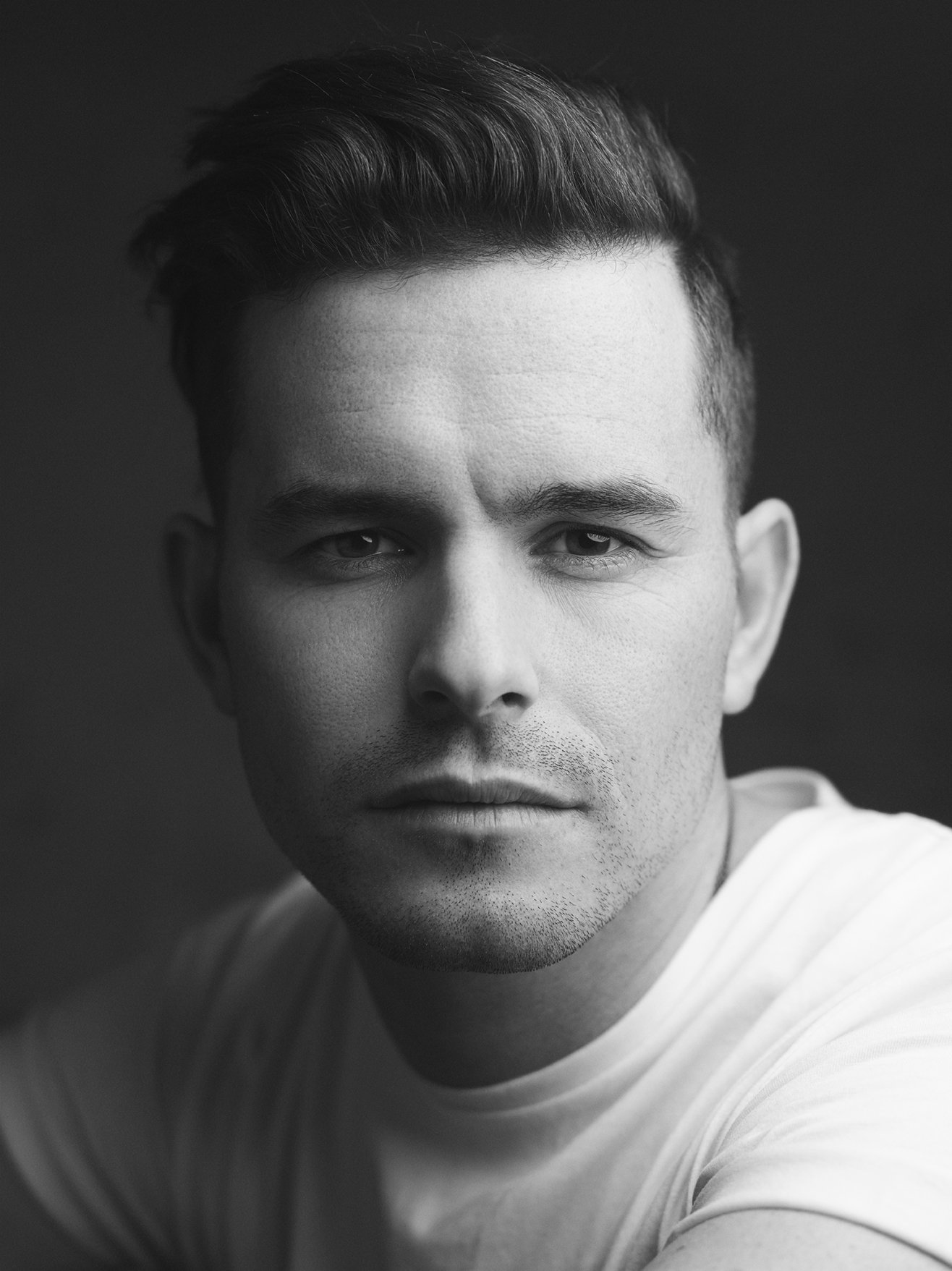

Nolan Winfield Sipe is an American songwriter and record producer. He is the son of the Cleveland Browns football player, Brian Sipe.

== Songwriting discography ==
Artist	Album	Song	Notes	Credit
Dean Lewis, Julia Michaels	In a Perfect World - Single	In a Perfect World		Songwriter, Producer
All Time Low	Calm Down	Tell Me I'm Alive		Songwriter
OneRepublic	Runaway - Single	Runaway		Songwriter
Mimi Webb	Ghost of You - Single	Ghost of You		Songwriter
Calum Scott	Bridges	Heaven		Songwriter
Lukas Graham	All Of It All - Single	All Of It All		Songwriter
Benson Boone	Fireworks & Rollerblades	Greatest Fear		Songwriter
Benson Boone	Ghost Town - Single	Ghost Town	Single Certified US (RIAA) Platinum	Songwriter
Benson Boone	Walk Me Home...	NIGHTS LIKE THESE		Songwriter
Benson Boone	Walk Me Home...	Let Me Go		Songwriter
Benson Boone	Walk Me Home...	Empty Heart Shaped Box		Songwriter
Cole Swindell	Spanish Moss	Lost Heart		Songwriter
Alex Warren	You'll Be Alright, Kid (Chapter 1)	Chasing Shadows		Songwriter
Alex Warren	You'll Be Alright, Kid (Chapter 1)	You'll Be Alright, Kid		Songwriter
Alex Warren	You'll Be Alright, Kid (Chapter 1)	Yard Sale		Songwriter
Alex Warren	Give You Love - Single	Give You Love		Songwriter
Cameron Whitcomb	The Hard Way	Options		Songwriter
Cameron Whitcomb	The Hard Way	Quitter	Single Certified Canadian (MC) Platinum	Songwriter
Cameron Whitcomb	Bad Apple - Single	Bad Apple		Songwriter
Cameron Whitcomb	Deep Water	Kingdom of Fear		Songwriter
Cameron Whitcomb	Deep Water	You and Me		Songwriter
Parmalee, Blanco Brown	Just the Way - Single	Just the Way	Single Certified US (RIAA) 2× Platinum; Billboard Country National Airplay #1	Songwriter
Parmalee, Blanco Brown, Bryce Vine	Just the Way - Single	Just the Way (feat. Bryce Vine)		Songwriter
Parmalee, FITZ	For You	Greatest Hits		Songwriter
Andy Grammer	Good in Me - Single	Good in Me		Songwriter
Andy Grammer	Magazines or Novels	Honey, I'm Good.	Single Certified US (RIAA) 4× Platinum; US Adult Top 40 #1; US Adult Contemporary #3; US Mainstream Top 40 #8; US Billboard Hot 100 #9	Producer, Songwriter
Andy Grammer and Eli Young Band	Honey, I'm Good - Single	Honey, I'm Good		Songwriter
Andy Grammer	Lease on Life - Single	Lease on Life		Songwriter
Andy Grammer, Cash Cash	I Found You - Single	I Found You		Songwriter
Andy Grammer	Naive	I Found You		Songwriter
Andy Grammer	Naive	Born For This		Songwriter
Andy Grammer	Naive	Stay There		Songwriter
Andy Grammer	The Good Parts	Smoke Clears	US Adult Top 40 #13	Songwriter
The Script	Satellites	Gone		Songwriter
The Script	Satellites	Run Run Run		Songwriter
James TW	When You Love Someone - Single	When You Love Someone	Single Certified US (RIAA) Gold Single Certified UK (BPI) Platinum	Songwriter
James TW	Ex - Single	Ex		Producer, Songwriter
MAX ft Huh Yunjin	Love in Stereo	Stupid in Love		Songwriter
MAX	Love Me Less - Single	Love Me Less Feat. Quinn XCII	Single Certified US (RIAA) Platinum	Songwriter
MAX	Colour Vision	Colour Vision		Songwriter
MAX	Colour Vision	New Life		Songwriter
MAX	Colour Vision	There is a God		Songwriter
Robin Schulz, Marc Scibilia	Uncovered	Unforgettable	German Airplay #1	Songwriter
Tim McGraw and Faith Hill	The Rest of Our Life	Devil Callin' Me Back	Album US (Billboard 200) #2; Album US (Top Country Albums) #1	Songwriter
Jake Owen	Greetings From... Jake	Señorita Feat. Lele Pons	Album US (Top Country Albums) #8	Songwriter
King Calaway	Rivers	Obvious		Songwriter
Fitz and the Tantrums	Sway - Single	Sway		Songwriter
Fitz and the Tantrums	Let Yourself Free	Ahhhh		Songwriter
Fitz and the Tantrums	Let Yourself Free	Heaven		Songwriter
FITZ, Bryce Vine	Head Up High	Congratulations		Songwriter
FITZ	Head Up High	Spaceman		Songwriter
FITZ	Head Up High	Still Cool		Songwriter
FITZ	Head Up High	Zig Zag		Songwriter
Bea Miller	Not an Apology	Fire N Gold	Single Certified US (RIAA) Gold	Songwriter
ROZES, Nicky Romero	Where Would We Be - Single	Where Would We Be		Songwriter
Hey Violet	Party Girl - Single	Party Girl		Songwriter
Moxie Raia	Buffalo Bill	Buffalo Bill		Songwriter
Moxie Raia / Tiësto	Buffalo Bill	Buffalo Bill (Tiësto Remix)		Songwriter
Moxie Raia / Wyclef Jean	931 Reloaded	Follow Me		Songwriter
Simple Plan feat. Natasha Bedingfield	Get Your Heart On	Jet Lag	Single Certified Canadian (Canadian Hot 100) Platinum; Single Certified Australian (ARIA) 2× Platinum; Single Australia (ARIA) #8; Single Canada (Canadian Hot 100) #11; Single US (Adult Pop Songs) #25	Songwriter
Simple Plan feat. Marie-Mai	Get Your Heart On	Jet Lag	Winner NRJ Music Award, Best Francophone Band/Duo	Songwriter
Simple Plan	Get Your Heart On - The Second Coming!	The Rest of Us		Songwriter
Matt Nathanson	Sings His Sad Heart	Long Distance Runner		Songwriter
Matt Nathanson	Sings His Sad Heart	Different Beds		Songwriter
ONE OK ROCK	Ambitions	Bedroom Warfare	Album Certified Gold; Album JP (Oricon) #1; Album US Top Alternative (Billboard) #9	Songwriter
Skillet	Anchor	Victorious		Songwriter
Against The Current	In Our Bones	Wasteland		Songwriter
Against The Current	In Our Bones	One More Weekend		Songwriter
Against The Current	Past Lives	I Like the Way		Songwriter
Against The Current	Past Lives	P.A.T.T.		Songwriter
Francesca Battistelli	The Shack - Music From and Inspired by the Original Motion Picture	Where Were You	US Christian Albums #1 US Billboard 200 #40	Producer, Songwriter
Maty Noyes	Porn Star - Single	Porn Star		Songwriter
Phantoms	Agenda - Single	Agenda Feat Nicole Millar		Songwriter
Joel Adams	Big World - Single	Big World		Songwriter
Kris Allen feat. Meiko	Thank You Camellia	Loves Me Not		Songwriter
Conrad Sewell	All I Know (EP)	21 Questions		Songwriter
Marc Scibilia, StadiumX	Those Were the Days - Single	Those Were the Days		Songwriter
Jonas Brothers	Jonas L.A.	Invisible	Album Certified US (RIAA) Gold; Album US (Billboard Top 200) #7	Producer, Mixer, Engineer
Jonas Brothers	Jonas L.A.	Fall	Album Certified US (RIAA) Gold; Album US (Billboard Top 200) #7	Producer, Mixer, Engineer
Dave Matthews Band	Live in New York City			Mixer
Dave Matthews Band	Live at Wrigley Field			Mixer
Dave Matthews and Tim Reynolds	Live in Las Vegas		Grammy Nominated, Best Rock Instrumental	Mixer
Zac Brown Band	Pass the Jar		Album Certified US (RIAA) Gold; Album US (Billboard Top Country Albums) #2; Album US (Billboard Top 200) #17	Mixer
Colbie Caillat	Breakthrough		Album Certified US (RIAA) Gold; Album US (Billboard Top 200) #1; Album Canada (Canadian Hot 100) #5	Engineer
