= The Hard Way (Cameron Whitcomb album) =

2025 album by Cameron Whitcomb

Studio album by Cameron Whitcomb
- Released: September 26, 2025
- Length: 37:40; 52:10 (deluxe)
- Label: Atlantic
- Producers: Beau Bedford; Dan Fernandez; Jeff Levin; Jack Riley; David Schaeman; Cal Shapiro

Cameron Whitcomb chronology
| Quitter (2024) | The Hard Way (2025) | Deep Water (2026) |

Singles from The Hard Way
- 1. "Quitter" Released: July 26, 2024; 2. "Medusa" Released: November 8, 2024; 3. "Options" Released: March 7, 2025; 4. "The Hard Way" Released: December 8, 2025

The Hard Way is the debut studio album by Canadian singer-songwriter Cameron Whitcomb. It was primarily produced by Jack Riley, and released on September 26, 2025, via Atlantic Records. The album includes the singles "Quitter", "Medusa", and "Options", as well as the promotional singles "Hundred Mile High", "Fragile", and "The Hard Way". Whitcomb supported the album with his headlining "I've Got Options Tour" across the United States in the fall of 2025, and his headlining "The Hard Way Tour" in Australia and New Zealand in early 2026.

== Background ==
The album explores Whitcomb's battle with addiction at a young age, his recovery, and the mental health struggles that accompanied his journey getting sober. Whitcomb co-wrote every song on the album, with the majority of the songs being writing collaborations with Jack Riley, Cal Shapiro, and Nolan Sipe.

== Critical reception ==
Victoria Goodwin of Melodic Magazine called The Hard Way a "great first album". She described it as "raw", "vulnerable", and "hopeful", adding that it "[feels] like a journey through [Whitcomb's] mind or a roadmap for anyone who's had to fight to find themselves again."

== Track listing ==
The Hard Way track listing
| No. | Title | Writer(s) | Producer(s) | Length |
|---|---|---|---|---|
| 1. | "The Hard Way" | Cameron Whitcomb; Jack Riley; Cal Shapiro; Nolan Winfield Sipe | Riley; Shapiro | 2:42 |
| 2. | "Options" | Whitcomb; Riley; Shapiro; Sipe | Riley | 2:49 |
| 3. | "Lose Me" | Whitcomb; Riley; Shapiro | Riley | 2:46 |
| 4. | "Fragile Ego (Interlude)" | Whitcomb | | 0:33 |
| 5. | "Fragile" | Whitcomb; Shapiro; Riley; Sipe | Riley | 3:22 |
| 6. | "Call for You" | Whitcomb; Shapiro; Riley; Sipe | Riley | 3:38 |
| 7. | "Quitter" | Whitcomb; Sipe; Ben Cottrill; David Schaeman | Schaeman | 2:41 |
| 8. | "Holiday" | Whitcomb; Shapiro; Riley; Sipe | Riley; Shapiro | 3:00 |
| 9. | "Pretty Little" | Whitcomb; Shapiro; Riley; Sipe | Riley | 2:35 |
| 10. | "Hundred Mile High" | Whitcomb; Riley; Shapiro | Riley | 2:52 |
| 11. | "Missed Calls (Interlude)" | Whitcomb | Jeff Levin | 0:13 |
| 12. | "As I Stand Before the Coffin" | Whitcomb; Beau Bedford | Bedford | 4:10 |
| 13. | "Digging Holes" | Whitcomb; Sipe; Dan Fernandez | Riley; Fernandez | 2:49 |
| 14. | "Medusa" | Whitcomb; Riley; Shapiro | Riley | 2:37 |
| 15. | "Polly (Interlude)" | Whitcomb | | 0:47 |
| Total length: | | | | 37:40 |

The Hard Way (Deluxe) track listing
| No. | Title | Writer(s) | Producer(s) | Length |
|---|---|---|---|---|
| 1. | "The Hard Way" | Cameron Whitcomb; Jack Riley; Cal Shapiro; Nolan Winfield Sipe | Riley; Shapiro | 2:42 |
| 2. | "Options" | Whitcomb; Riley; Shapiro; Sipe | Riley | 2:49 |
| 3. | "Lose Me" | Whitcomb; Riley; Shapiro | Riley | 2:46 |
| 4. | "Fragile Ego (Interlude)" | Whitcomb | | 0:33 |
| 5. | "Fragile" | Whitcomb; Shapiro; Riley; Sipe | Riley | 3:22 |
| 6. | "Call for You" | Whitcomb; Shapiro; Riley; Sipe | Riley | 3:38 |
| 7. | "Quitter" | Whitcomb; Sipe; Ben Cottrill; David Schaeman | Schaeman | 2:41 |
| 8. | "Holiday" | Whitcomb; Shapiro; Riley; Sipe | Riley; Shapiro | 3:00 |
| 9. | "Pretty Little" | Whitcomb; Shapiro; Riley; Sipe | Riley | 2:35 |
| 10. | "King for a Day" | Whitcomb; Shapiro; Riley; Sipe | Riley | 3:11 |
| 11. | "Hundred Mile High" | Whitcomb; Riley; Shapiro | Riley | 2:52 |
| 12. | "Wildheart" | Whitcomb; Shapiro; Riley; Sipe | Riley | 2:46 |
| 13. | "Missed Calls (Interlude)" | Whitcomb | Jeff Levin | 0:13 |
| 14. | "As I Stand Before the Coffin" | Whitcomb; Beau Bedford | Bedford | 4:10 |
| 15. | "Problem" | Whitcomb; Shapiro; Riley; Sipe | Riley | 2:34 |
| 16. | "The Worst By Far" | Whitcomb; Shapiro; Riley; Sipe | Riley | 2:53 |
| 17. | "Digging Holes" | Whitcomb; Sipe; Dan Fernandez | Riley; Fernandez | 2:49 |
| 18. | "Medusa" | Whitcomb; Riley; Shapiro | Riley | 2:37 |
| 19. | "Polly (Interlude)" | Whitcomb | | 0:47 |
| 20. | "End of the Morning" (featuring Evan Honer) | Whitcomb; Riley; Dylan Godfrey; Evan Honer | Riley | 3:04 |
| Total length: | | | | 52:10 |

== Personnel ==
Credits adapted from Tidal.

- Cameron Whitcomb – vocals (all tracks), guitar (track 15)
- Mitch McCarthy – mixing
- Nathan Dantzler – mastering (1–6, 8)
- Randy Merrill – mastering (7)
- Cal Shapiro – background vocals (1–3, 8–10, 14), vocals (4)
- Jack Riley – background vocals (1, 3, 8–10, 14)
- Nolan Sipe – background vocals (1, 2, 8, 9)
- Shilo Preshyon – engineering (2)
- Gabe Gladstein – strings (3)
- Donald Whitcomb – vocals (11)
- Addie Levy – mandolin (14)

== Charts ==
Chart performance for The Hard Way
| Chart (2025–2026) | Peak position |
|---|---|
| Australian Albums (ARIA) | 29 |
| Australian Country Albums (ARIA) | 4 |
| Belgian Albums (Ultratop Flanders) | 164 |
| Canadian Albums (Billboard) | 12 |
| UK Album Downloads (Official Charts) | 59 |
| UK Americana Albums (Official Charts) | 4 |
| UK Country Albums (Official Charts) | 9 |
| US Americana/Folk Albums (Billboard) | 16 |
| US Top Country Albums (Billboard) | 42 |

=== Singles ===
| Title | Year | Peak chart positions | | | | | | | | Certifications |
| Title | Year | AUS Country | CAN | IRE | NLD | NOR | NZ Hot | SWE | US Rock | Certifications |
|---|---|---|---|---|---|---|---|---|---|---|
| "Quitter" | 2024 | 23 | 33 | — | — | — | — | — | — | ARIA: Gold; MC: 2× Platinum |
| "Medusa" | 2024 | 24 | 63 | 93 | 5 | 29 | — | 53 | 29 | ARIA: Gold; MC: Platinum |
| "Options" | 2025 | 31 | 66 | — | — | — | 17 | — | 34 | MC: Gold |
| "The Hard Way" | 2025 | 36 | — | — | — | — | 35 | — | — | |
"—" denotes releases that did not chart or were not released to that territory.

==== Promotional singles ====
| Title | Year | Peak chart positions | | | Certifications |
| Title | Year | CAN | NZ Hot | US Rock | Certifications |
|---|---|---|---|---|---|
| "Hundred Mile High" | 2025 | 88 | 10 | 33 | MC: Gold |
| "Fragile" | 2025 | — | — | — | |
"—" denotes releases that did not chart.

== Certifications ==
| Region | Certification | Certified units/sales |
|---|---|---|
| Canada (Music Canada) | Platinum | 80,000^{‡} |
^{‡} Sales+streaming figures based on certification alone.

== Release history ==
Release formats for The Hard Way
| Country | Date | Format | Label | Ref. |
|---|---|---|---|---|
| Various | September 26, 2025 | CD | Atlantic | |
| Various | September 26, 2025 | LP record | Atlantic | |
| Various | September 26, 2025 | Digital download | Atlantic | |
| Various | September 26, 2025 | Streaming | Atlantic | |
