= Dinner Party (album) =

Studio album by Niall Horan
- Released: 5 June 2026
- Genre: Pop
- Length: 36:48
- Label: Capitol
- Producers: Afterhrs; Julian Bunetta; John Ryan; Matt Zara

Niall Horan chronology
The Show (2023)	Dinner Party (2026)

Singles from Dinner Party
- 1. "Dinner Party" Released: 20 March 2026; 2. "Little More Time" Released: 23 April 2026; 3. "End of an Era" Released: 22 May 2026

Dinner Party is the fourth studio album by the Irish singer and songwriter Niall Horan, released on 5 June 2026 through Capitol Records. The album charted at number one in Australia, Belgium, Germany, Ireland, the Netherlands and the United Kingdom.

== Background and release ==
Horan wrote the album's title track after meeting his long-time girlfriend for the first time at a friend's dinner party. Horan has cited Irish musician Damien Rice as a particular influence in the album's music. The album itself was released on 5 June 2026, with the lead single "Dinner Party" being released on 20 March 2026. The second single was "Little More Time", released on 23 April 2026. Horan explained that the album closer, "End of an Era", was re-written following the passing of his former One Direction bandmate Liam Payne, and that he now considers the song a tribute and celebration of Payne's life and their friendship. The track was released as the third single on 22 May 2026.

== Critical reception ==
Professional ratings
Review scores
Source	Rating
AllMusic	3/5 stars
Associated Press	3/5 stars
Clash	8/10
Hot Press	8/10
The Irish Times	4/5 stars
Nieuwsblad	3.5/5 stars
RTÉ	3.5/5 stars

Ed Power of The Irish Times complimented Dinner Party as "a joyously moreish collection of mid-tempo pop".

== Commercial performance ==
Dinner Party achieved strong chart performance internationally, reaching the top 10 in fifteen countries and topping the charts in seven, including Ireland, Australia, Belgium, Germany, Scotland, the Netherlands, and the United Kingdom.

In Horan's native Ireland, Dinner Party debuted at number one on the Irish Albums Chart, becoming his fourth consecutive chart-topper. In Scotland, the album also debuted at number one on the Scottish Albums Chart, marking his second chart-topper there after The Show (2023). In the United Kingdom, Dinner Party debuted at number one on the UK Albums Chart, selling 28,121 album-equivalent units in its first week. It marked the biggest opening week of Horan's career and became his third consecutive number-one album in the country. In its second week, the album fell from number one and dropped out of the UK Albums Chart's top 100, making it one of the few number-one albums to spend only a single week in the top 100.

In the United States, Dinner Party debuted at number seven on the Billboard 200, becoming Horan's fourth top-ten album. It also topped the Top Album Sales chart, selling 55,000 units.

== Track listing ==
Standard track listing
No.	Title	Writer(s)	Producer(s)	Length
1.	"Tastes So Good"	Niall Horan; John Ryan; Julian Bunetta; Matt Zara; Rocky Block	Ryan; Bunetta; Zara	3:05
2.	"Dinner Party"	Horan; Ryan; Bunetta; Ian Franzino; Andrew Haas; Jamie Scott	Afterhrs; Ryan; Bunetta	2:34
3.	"Monochromatic"	Horan; Ryan; Bunetta; Franzino; Haas; Scott	Ryan; Bunetta; Afterhrs	2:44
4.	"She Gets It from Her Mother"	Horan; Ryan; Zara; Block	Ryan; Zara	3:24
5.	"Better Man"	Horan; Ryan; Bunetta; Franzino; Haas; Scott	Ryan; Bunetta; Afterhrs	3:13
6.	"Little More Time"	Horan; Franzino; Haas; Block; Steph Jones	Ryan; Bunetta; Afterhrs	3:38
7.	"Flowers"	Horan; Ryan; Bunetta; Joel Little; Amy Allen	Ryan; Bunetta	2:26
8.	"Boys Are Fun"	Horan; Ryan; Bunetta; Franzino; Haas; Scott	Ryan; Bunetta; Afterhrs	3:33
9.	"Fighting over Nothing"	Horan; Ryan; Bunetta; Franzino; Haas; Scott	Ryan; Bunetta; Afterhrs	2:30
10.	"Pretty"	Horan; Ryan; Bunetta; Franzino; Haas; Scott	Ryan; Bunetta; Afterhrs	2:54
11.	"Die If I Don't"	Horan; Ryan; Bunetta; Franzino; Haas; Scott	Ryan; Bunetta; Afterhrs	3:09
12.	"End of an Era"	Horan; Ryan; Bunetta; Jones	Ryan; Bunetta; Afterhrs	3:38
Total length:				36:48

Target exclusive and digital bonus track
No.	Title	Writer(s)	Producer(s)	Length
13.	"Mia"	Horan; Ryan; Bunetta; Allen; Little	Ryan; Bunetta

Store exclusive bonus track
No.	Title	Length
13.	"Loneliest Girl in the World"

== Personnel ==
The credits are adapted from Tidal.

=== Musicians ===
- Niall Horan – lead vocals, background vocals, acoustic guitar, electric guitar
- John Ryan – background vocals (tracks 1–5, 7–12), acoustic guitar (1–5, 7, 8, 10–12), programming (1–4, 7, 8, 10–12), keyboards (1, 2, 7, 8, 11), electric guitar (1, 3–8, 10–12), bass (1, 3, 4, 7, 8, 10, 11), drums (1, 4, 7), piano (5)
- Julian Bunetta – background vocals (1–3, 7–10, 12), programming (1–3, 7, 8, 10–12), drums (1, 2, 7, 9, 10, 12), electric guitar (3, 6, 8–10, 12), keyboards (3, 7–9, 12), acoustic guitar (8), bass (9, 10, 12)
- Damon Bunetta – background vocals (1–3, 6–10)
- Matt Zara – acoustic guitar, bass, electric guitar, keyboards (1, 4); programming (1), drums (4)
- Andrew Haas (Note: Credited individually and as part of Afterhrs) – programming (2, 3, 5, 6, 8–11), background vocals (2, 3, 5, 6, 8–10), acoustic guitar (2, 3, 5, 6, 9, 10), bass (2, 5, 6, 9, 10), electric guitar (2, 5, 6, 9), keyboards (2, 6, 10), drums (6, 9)
- Ian Franzino – programming (2, 3, 5, 6, 8–11), background vocals (2, 3, 5, 6, 8–10), keyboards (2, 6, 9), drums (6, 9)
- Jamie Scott – background vocals (2, 5), electric guitar (5)
- Aaron Sterling – drums (2, 6)
- Jake Curran – electric guitar (2)
- Dave Cohen – keyboards (3, 8, 12)
- Ian Fitchuk – drums (3, 8), acoustic guitar (3)
- Rich Brinsfield – bass (3, 8)
- Kris Donegan – electric guitar (3, 8)
- Sam Hunter – acoustic guitar (3), electric guitar (8)
- Rocky Block – keyboards (4), background vocals (6)
- Steph Jones – background vocals (6)
- Brendan Civale – background vocals (7)
- Jeff Gunnell – background vocals (7)
- Joel Little – electric guitar (7)
- Joshua Reedy – background vocals (8)
- Peter Bunetta – percussion (8)
- Seán Óg Graham – accordion, bouzouki (11)
- Damian McKee – accordion (11)
- Eamon Murray – bodhrán (11)
- Niamh Dunne – fiddle, strings (11)
- Liam Bradley – Mellotron (11)
- Mark Rudin – trombone, trumpet (11)

=== Technical ===
- Jeff Gunnell – engineering (all tracks), mixing (3–5, 9–11)
- Julian Bunetta – engineering (1–3, 5, 7–12)
- Bryce Bordone – engineering (1, 2, 8)
- John Ryan – engineering (1, 3–12)
- Andrew Haas – engineering (2, 3, 5, 6, 8–12)
- Ian Franzino – engineering (2, 3, 5, 6, 8–12)
- Brad King – engineering (3, 8, 12)
- Matt Zara – engineering (4)
- Martin Hannah – engineering (6, 11, 12)
- Micah Tawiks – engineering (8, 12)
- Arthur Caplan – engineering (8)
- Austin Brown – engineering assistance (3, 8, 12)
- Serban Ghenea – mixing (1, 2, 8)
- Rich Costey – mixing (6, 7, 12)
- Carlos Mas – mixing assistance (3, 6, 7, 12)
- Nathan Dantzler – mastering
- Harrison Tate – mastering assistance

== Charts ==
Chart performance
Chart (2026)	Peak position
Australian Albums (ARIA)	1
Austrian Albums (Ö3 Austria)	2
Belgian Albums (Ultratop Flanders)	1
Belgian Albums (Ultratop Wallonia)	1
Canadian Albums (Billboard)	12
Danish Albums (Hitlisten)	7
Dutch Albums (Album Top 100)	1
Finnish Albums (Suomen virallinen lista)	11
French Albums (SNEP)	27
German Albums (Offizielle Top 100)	1
German Pop Albums (Offizielle Top 100)	1
Irish Albums (Official Charts)	1
Italian Albums (FIMI)	4
New Zealand Albums (RMNZ)	6
Norwegian Albums (IFPI Norge)	82
Polish Albums (ZPAV)	3
Portuguese Albums (AFP)	68
Scottish Albums (Official Charts)	1
Spanish Albums (Promusicae)	9
Swedish Albums (Sverigetopplistan)	40
Swiss Albums (Schweizer Hitparade)	4
UK Albums (Official Charts)	1
US Billboard 200	7
