= End of an Era (Niall Horan song) =

2026 single by Niall Horan

Single by Niall Horan

from the album Dinner Party
- Released: 22 May 2026
- Length: 3:38
- Label: Capitol
- Songwriters: Niall Horan; John Ryan; Julian Bunetta; Steph Jones
- Producers: John Ryan; Julian Bunetta; Afterhrs

Niall Horan singles chronology
"Little More Time" (2026)	"End of an Era" (2026)

"End of an Era" is a song by Irish singer-songwriter Niall Horan, released on 22 May 2026 through Capitol Records as the third single from his fourth studio album, Dinner Party.

== Background ==
The single was written by Horan himself, along with John Ryan, Julian Bunetta, and Steph Jones. Horan explained that the song was re-written following the passing of his former One Direction bandmate Liam Payne, and that he now considers the song a tribute and celebration of Payne's life and their friendship.

In an interview with American Songwriter, Horan said, "Julian, John, and I wrote it together because we all were all very close with Liam. It was like a therapy session for the three of us. I felt like, as I said, you're writing about personal stuff, that's one of the biggest things that's happened in my life."

== Reception ==
Shannon Garner of Clash states that the song "reframes the themes that have been present throughout, suggesting that affection endures even when circumstances change, and that grief often becomes another expression of love."

Mike DeWald of Riff Magazine said of the song, "If Dinner Party truly functions as a metaphorical gathering, this is the moment when the evening winds down and the conversation turns nostalgic — the point where everyone lingers a little longer, reflecting on the past."

Pavel Snapkou of Showbiz by PS says, "Rather than leaning into drama, Horan delivers something warm, mature, and hopeful." Snapkou then exaggerates, "I can't imagine anyone other than Niall having the responsibility and guts to create this touching and bright tribute."
