= Cry (Benson Boone song) =

Song by Benson Boone

from the album Fireworks & Rollerblades
- Released: April 4, 2024
- Genre: Pop rock; hair metal
- Length: 3:07
- Label: Night Street; Warner
- Songwriters: Benson Boone; Jack LaFrantz; Malay
- Producer: Malay

Lyric video
- "Cry" on YouTube

"Cry" is a song by American singer and songwriter Benson Boone. It was released through Night Street and Warner Records on April 4, 2024, from his debut studio album Fireworks & Rollerblades (2024). The song was written by Boone, Jack LaFrantz and Malay, the latter who also produced the song. The song charted worldwide after the album's release peaking at number 60 in the US and number 55 in the UK. It has been cited as a fan-favorite off the album.

== Composition ==
"Cry" begins as a ballad then goes into an edgy pop rock song about heartbreak. It is raw and emotionally in depth, focusing on experiencing manipulation and gaslighting in a relationship.

== Reception ==
Vulture referred to Boone's vocals in the song as a "hair-metal-esque falsetto" and highlighted the song as a standout on the album. The song is considered a fan favorite off the album.

== Charts ==
Chart performance for "Cry"
| Chart (2024–2025) | Peak position |
|---|---|
| Canada Hot 100 (Billboard) | 52 |
| Czech Republic Airplay (ČNS IFPI) | 14 |
| Global 200 (Billboard) | 86 |
| Ireland (IRMA) | 53 |
| New Zealand Hot Singles (RMNZ) | 6 |
| Norway (VG-lista) | 36 |
| Portugal Airplay (AFP) | 22 |
| Sweden (Sverigetopplistan) | 78 |
| Switzerland (Schweizer Hitparade) | 90 |
| UK Singles (OCC) | 55 |
| US Billboard Hot 100 | 60 |

== Certifications ==
Certifications for "Cry"
| Region | Certification | Certified units/sales |
|---|---|---|
| Australia (ARIA) | Gold | 35,000^{‡} |
| Canada (Music Canada) | Platinum | 80,000^{‡} |
| France (SNEP) | Gold | 100,000^{‡} |
| New Zealand (RMNZ) | Gold | 15,000^{‡} |
| United Kingdom (BPI) | Silver | 200,000^{‡} |
| United States (RIAA) | Gold | 500,000^{‡} |
^{‡} Sales+streaming figures based on certification alone.
