= Quitter (song) =

2024 single by Canadian singer-songwriter Cameron Whitcomb

Single by Cameron Whitcomb

from the EP Quitter and the album The Hard Way
- Released: July 26, 2024
- Genre: Country folk; folk rock; folk-pop
- Length: 2:41
- Label: Atlantic
- Songwriters: Cameron Whitcomb; Nolan Sipe; Ben Cottrill; David Schaeman
- Producer: David Schaeman

Cameron Whitcomb singles chronology
"Quitter" (2024)	"Medusa" (2025)

Lyric video
- "Quitter" on YouTube

EP cover

"Quitter" is a song recorded by Canadian singer-songwriter Cameron Whitcomb. He wrote the track with Nolan Sipe, Ben Cottrill, and David Schaeman, the latter of whom produced the track. The song is the title track and lead single off Whitcomb's 2024 extended play Quitter and his 2025 debut studio album, The Hard Way, released via Atlantic Records.

== Background ==
Whitcomb wrote the song while on a trip to write with Nolan Sipe, Ben Cottrill and David Schaeman in Los Angeles. In writing the song, Whitcomb took inspiration from his own personal experience overcoming addiction.

== Critical reception ==
Rosie Long Decter of Billboard Canada described "Quitter" as "anthemic folk track in the mould of Noah Kahan", noting a "a kick-clap beat" and Whitcomb's "growling vocal". Alli Patton of Holler favourably spoke of the song, noting "sharp strums and a shuddering kick drum", as well as "a torrent of rhythm and steel. She described this as "an exciting and triumphant arrangement" which "feeds its message of recovery and resilience".

== Accolades ==
Year	Association	Category	Result	Ref
2025	Canadian Country Music Association	Single of the Year	Nominated	
2025	Canadian Country Music Association	Songwriter(s) of the Year	Nominated	

== Track listings ==
Digital download – single

1. "Quitter" – 2:41

Digital download – EP

1. "Love Myself" – 3:09
2. "By My Own Hand" – 2:52
3. "Wreckage" – 3:47
4. "Flower Tattoos" – 3:47
5. "Quitter" – 2:41

== Chart performance ==
The song marked Whitcomb's first entry on the all-genre national Canadian Hot 100 chart.

== Charts ==
=== Weekly charts ===
Weekly chart performance for "Quitter"
Chart (2024–2025)	Peak position
Australia Country Hot 50 (The Music)	23
Canada (Canadian Hot 100)	33
Canada AC (Billboard)	8
Canada CHR Top 40 (Billboard)	5
Canada Country (Billboard)	8
Canada Hot AC (Billboard)	11
Canada Mainstream Rock (Billboard)	31
Canada Modern Rock (Billboard)	11
UK Country Airplay (Radiomonitor)	27

=== Year-end charts ===
Year-end chart performance for "Quitter"
Chart (2025)	Position
Canada (Canadian Hot 100)	43
Canada AC (Billboard)	23
Canada CHR Top 40 (Billboard)	18
Canada Country (Billboard)	26
Canada Hot AC (Billboard)	23
Canada Mainstream Rock (Billboard)	59
Canada Modern Rock (Billboard)	30

== Certifications ==
Certifications for "Quitter"
Region	Certification	Certified units/sales
Australia (ARIA)	Gold	35,000^{‡}
Canada (Music Canada)	3× Platinum	240,000^{‡}
New Zealand (RMNZ)	Gold	15,000^{‡}
^{‡} Sales+streaming figures based on certification alone.
