= In the Stars (Benson Boone song) =

Single by Benson Boone

from the EP Walk Me Home...
- Released: April 29, 2022
- Length: 3:37
- Label: Night Street
- Songwriters: Benson Boone; Jason Evigan; Michael Pollack
- Producer: Jason Evigan

Benson Boone singles chronology
"Room for 2" (2022)	"In the Stars" (2022)	"Better Alone" (2022)

"In the Stars" is a song by American singer and songwriter Benson Boone, released as a single on April 29, 2022, through Night Street Records. It was co-written by Boone with Jason Evigan and Michael Pollack, and produced by Pollack, with Benson stating that he wrote the song about the death of his great-grandmother who turned 96.

It peaked in the top 10 in the Netherlands, Norway and Sweden. The song was certified Gold by the RIAA on January 19, 2023, and Platinum on October 6, 2023, making it his first Platinum single in the US. It was then featured in Boone’s EP Walk Me Home... and later his album Fireworks & Rollerblades.

== Charts ==
=== Weekly charts ===
Weekly chart performance for "In the Stars"
Chart (2022–2023)	Peak position
Australia (ARIA)	34
Austria (Ö3 Austria Top 40)	59
Belgium (Ultratop 50 Flanders)	6
Belgium (Ultratop 50 Wallonia)	12
Canada Hot 100 (Billboard)	30
Denmark (Tracklisten)	17
France (SNEP)	59
Global 200 (Billboard)	48
Ireland (IRMA)	10
Netherlands (Dutch Top 40)	3
Netherlands (Single Top 100)	8
New Zealand (Recorded Music NZ)	15
Norway (VG-lista)	4
Portugal (AFP)	72
South Africa Streaming (TOSAC)	64
Sweden (Sverigetopplistan)	8
Switzerland (Schweizer Hitparade)	37
UK Singles (Official Charts)	21
US Billboard Hot 100	82
US Adult Pop Airplay (Billboard)	24
US Pop Airplay (Billboard)	36

=== Year-end charts ===
2022 year-end chart performance for "In the Stars"
Chart (2022)	Position
Belgium (Ultratop 50 Flanders)	24
Belgium (Ultratop 50 Wallonia)	66
Netherlands (Dutch Top 40)	2
Netherlands (Single Top 100)	23
Norway (VG-lista)	17
Sweden (Sverigetopplistan)	61

2023 year-end chart performance for "In the Stars"
Chart (2023)	Position
France (SNEP)	80

2024 year-end chart performance for "In the Stars"
Chart (2024)	Position
France (SNEP)	171

2025 year-end chart performance for "In the Stars"
Chart (2025)	Position
Belgium (Ultratop 50 Flanders)	167

== Certifications ==
Certifications for "In the Stars"
Region	Certification	Certified units/sales
Australia (ARIA)	4× Platinum	280,000^{‡}
Austria (IFPI Austria)	Platinum	30,000^{‡}
Canada (Music Canada)	6× Platinum	480,000^{‡}
Denmark (IFPI Danmark)	Platinum	90,000^{‡}
France (SNEP)	Diamond	333,333^{‡}
Germany (BVMI)	Gold	300,000^{‡}
Italy (FIMI)	Platinum	100,000^{‡}
Netherlands (NVPI)	Platinum	80,000^{‡}
New Zealand (RMNZ)	3× Platinum	90,000^{‡}
Norway (IFPI Norway)	Gold	30,000^{‡}
Poland (ZPAV)	Platinum	50,000^{‡}
Portugal (AFP)	3× Platinum	75,000^{‡}
Spain (Promusicae)	Platinum	60,000^{‡}
Switzerland (IFPI Switzerland)	Platinum	20,000^{‡}
United Kingdom (BPI)	2× Platinum	1,200,000^{‡}
United States (RIAA)	2× Platinum	2,000,000^{‡}
^{‡} Sales+streaming figures based on certification alone.
