= Max Schneider discography =

Max discography
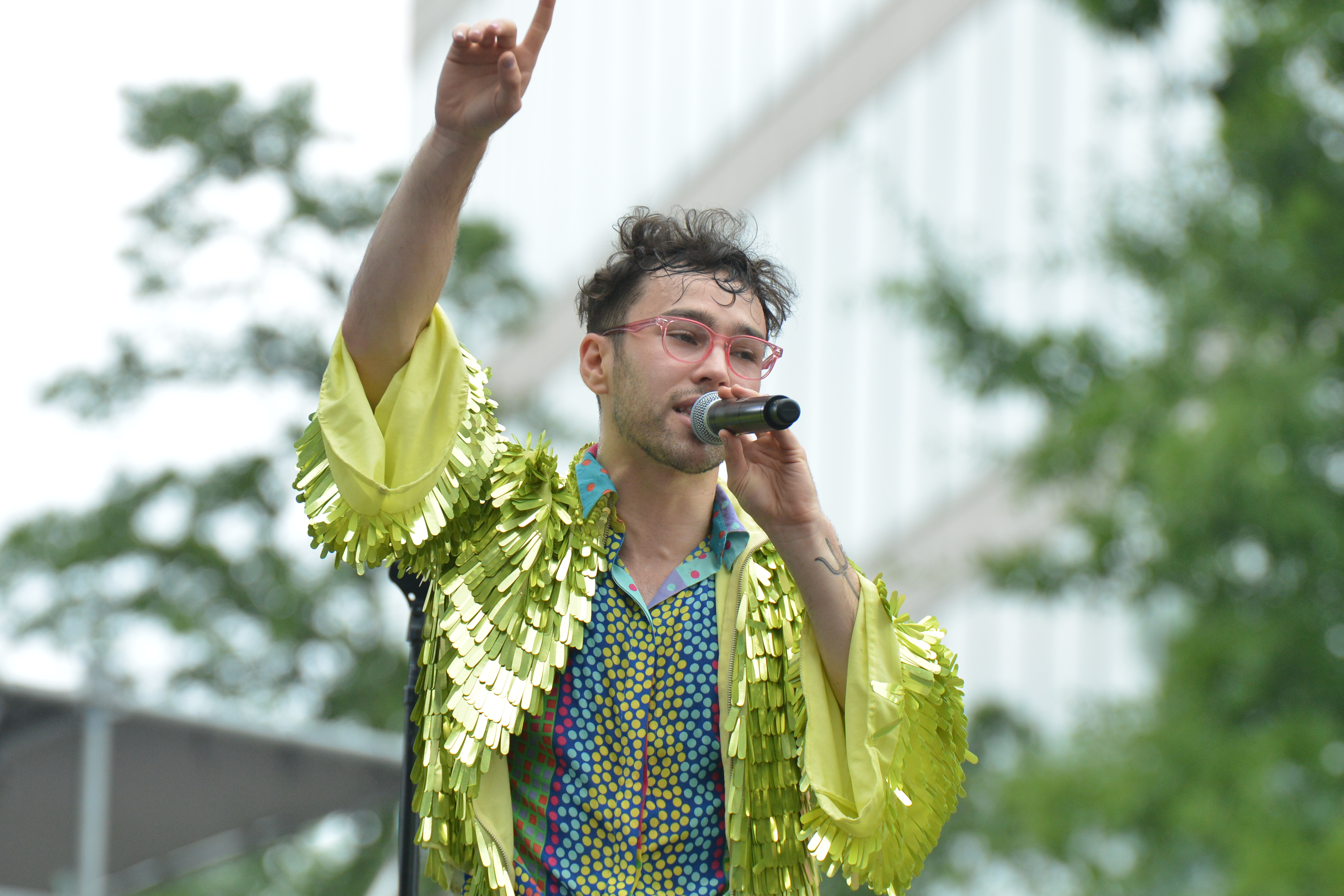
- Studio albums: 4
- EPs: 5
- Singles: 39
- Promotional singles: 7
- Guest appearances: 9

American singer Max has released three studio albums, five extended plays, 39 singles, seven promotional singles and nine other album appearances.

== Studio albums ==
List of studio albums, with selected details, chart positions
Title	Studio album details	Peak chart positions	
Title	Studio album details	US	US Indie.
NWL	Released: February 21, 2015; Labels: Independent; Format: Digital download	—	—
Hell's Kitchen Angel	Released: April 8, 2016; Labels: DCD2, Crush; Format: Digital download	154	—
Colour Vision	Released: September 18, 2020; Labels: Colour Vision, Sony; Format: CD, digital download, streaming, vinyl	137	27
Love in Stereo	Released: February 16, 2024; Labels: Colour Vision, Warner Records; Format: CD, digital download, streaming	—	—
"—" denotes releases that did not chart or were not released in that territory.

== Soundtracks ==
List of soundtracks
Title	Soundtrack details
Rags (Music from the Original Movie)	Released: May 22, 2012; Formats: Digital download; Label: Nickelodeon
Good Boy (Original Soundtrack)	Released: July 22, 2025; Formats: Digital download; Label: Warner Music Korea, SLL

== Extended plays ==
List of EPs, with selected details, chart positions
Title	Extended play details	Peak chart positions
Title	Extended play details	US Heat.
First Encounters	Released: June 5, 2010; Labels: Crush; Format: digital download	—
The Say Max EP	Released: May 13, 2014; Labels: Crush; Format: Digital download	—
Ms. Anonymous	Released: September 25, 2015; Labels: DCD2, Crush; Format: Digital download	—
Wrong	Released: December 18, 2015; Labels: DCD2, Crush; Format: Digital download	12
Lights Down Low	Released: October 14, 2016; Labels: DCD2, Crush; Format: Digital download	—
Spotify Singles	Released: May 31, 2017; Labels: DCD2, Crush; Format: Digital download	—
"—" denotes releases that did not chart or were not released in that territory.

== Singles ==
=== As lead artist ===
List of singles as lead artist, with selected chart positions, showing year released and album name
Title	Year	Peak chart positions										Certifications	Album
Title	Year	US	US AC	US Adult Pop	US Dance Elec.	US Pop	BEL (WA)	CAN	CZ Dig.	POR	SLK Dig.	Certifications	Album
"Nothing Without Love"	2013	—	—	—	—	—	—	—	—	—	—		NWL
"Mug Shot"	2014	—	—	—	—	—	—	—	—	—	—		NWL
"Gibberish" (featuring Hoodie Allen)	2015	—	—	—	—	—	—	—	79	—	77		Hell's Kitchen Angel
"Ms. Anonymous" (featuring Jared Evan)	2015	—	—	—	—	—	—	—	—	—	—		NWL
"Wrong" (featuring Lil Uzi Vert)	2015	—	—	—	—	—	—	—	—	—	—		Hell's Kitchen Angel
"Holla"	2016	—	—	—	—	—	—	—	—	—	—		Hell's Kitchen Angel
"Basement Party"	2016	—	—	—	—	—	—	—	—	—	—		Hell's Kitchen Angel
"Lights Down Low" (featuring Gnash)	2016	20	2	1	— (Note: "Lights Down Low" did not enter the Dance/Electronic Songs, but peaked at number 10 on the Dance/Mix Show Airplay chart.)	7	—	51	97	95	96	ARIA: Gold; RIAA: 3× Platinum; MC: 3× Platinum	Hell's Kitchen Angel
"You Want More" (with 3lau)	2016	—	—	—	—	—	—	—	—	—	—		Ultraviolet
"One More Weekend" (with Audien)	2017	—	—	—	43	—	—	—	—	—	—		Non-album singles
"Survive" (with SAINT WKND)	2017	—	—	—	—	—	—	—	—	—	—		Non-album singles
"Team" (with Noah Cyrus)	2018	—	—	33	—	38	—	—	—	—	—		Non-album singles
"Sax on the Beach" (with Party Pupils)	2018	—	—	—	—	—	—	—	—	—	—		Neon from Now On
"Still New York" (featuring Joey Badass)	2018	—	—	—	—	—	—	—	—	—	—		Non-album single
"Dear Sense" (with Louis the Child)	2018	—	—	—	26	—	—	—	—	—	—		Kids at Play
"Worship"	2018	—	—	—	—	—	—	—	—	—	—		Non-album single
"Love Me for the Weekend" (with Party Pupils and Ashe)	2018	—	—	—	—	—	—	—	—	—	—		Neon from Now On
"Love Me Less" (featuring Quinn XCII or Kim Petras)	2019	— (Note: "Love Me Less" did not enter the Billboard Hot 100, but peaked at number one on the Bubbling Under Hot 100 chart.)	—	37	— (Note: "Love Me Less" did not enter the Dance/Electronic Songs, but peaked at number 34 on the Dance/Mix Show Airplay chart.)	19	—	—	—	—	—	RIAA: Platinum; MC: Platinum	Colour Vision
"Acid Dreams" (with Felly)	2019	—	—	—	—	—	—	—	—	—	—		Colour Vision
"Checklist" (featuring Chromeo)	2019	—	—	—	—	36	—	—	—	—	—		Colour Vision
"Where Am I At"	2020	—	—	—	—	—	—	—	—	—	—		Colour Vision
"Missed Calls" (featuring Hayley Kiyoko)	2020	—	—	—	—	—	—	—	—	—	—		Colour Vision
"Naked" (with Jonas Blue)	2020	—	—	—	30	—	39	—	—	—	—		Est. 1989
"Working for the Weekend" (featuring bbno$)	2020	—	—	—	—	—	—	—	—	—	—		Colour Vision
"Blueberry Eyes" (featuring Suga)	2020	— (Note: "Blueberry Eyes" did not enter the Billboard Hot 100, but peaked at number 22 on the Digital Songs chart.)	—	—	—	39	—	— (Note: "Blueberry Eyes" did not enter the Canadian Hot 100, but peaked at number 46 on the Hot Digital Songs chart.)	—	—	—		Colour Vision
"Butterflies" (with Ali Gatie)	2021	—	—	16	—	—	—	—	—	—	—	RIAA: Gold; MC: Gold	Who Hurt You? and Love In Stereo
"Equal in the Darkness" (with Steve Aoki and Jolin Tsai)	2021	—	—	—	— (Note: "Equal in the Darkness" did not enter the Dance/Electronic Songs, but peaked at number 36 on the Dance/Mix Show Airplay chart.)	—	—	—	—	—	—		Non-album single
"Wasabi"	2022	—	—	—	—	—	—	—	—	—	—		Love In Stereo
"It's You" (with Keshi)	2022	—	—	—	—	—	—	—	—	—	—		Love In Stereo
"Worst Day" (with Illenium)	2022	—	—	—	—	—	—	—	—	—	—		Illenium
"Girlfriend" (Party Pupils, bbno$, MAX featuring Milli)	2023	—	—	—	—	—	—	—	—	—	—		Non-album single
"Strings" (featuring Jvke and Bazzi)	2023	—	—	—	—	40	—	—	—	—	—		Love In Stereo
"Say Less" (featuring Duckwrth)	2024	—	—	—	—	—	—	—	—	—	—		Love In Stereo
"Stupid in Love" (featuring Huh Yunjin)	2024	—	—	—	—	—	—	—	—	—	—		Love In Stereo
"Pinkberry"	2024	—	—	—	—	—	—	—	—	—	—		Non-album single
"Magnet" (with Gryffin and Disco Lines)	2024	—	—	—	—	—	—	—	—	—	—		Pulse
"Love Insane" (featuring Jay of Enhypen)	2025	—	—	—	—	—	—	—	—	—	—		Non-album single
"The Thing I Love" (with Andy Grammer)	2025	—	—	21	—	—	—	—	—	—	—		Non-album single
"Steady"	2026	—	—	–	—	—	—	—	—	—	—		Non-album single
"—" denotes releases that did not chart or were not released in that territory.

=== As featured artist ===
List of singles as featured artist, with selected chart positions, showing year released and album name
Title	Year	Peak chart positions			Album
Title	Year	US Dance Elec.	SWE	NZ Hot	Album
"Dragonfly" (Chris Malinchak featuring Max)	2015	—	—	—	Non-album single
"Did You Wrong" (Sweather Beats featuring Max)	2016	—	—	—	For the Cold
"Savage" (Whethan featuring Flux Pavilion and Max)	2016	29	—	—	Non-album single
"Pacific Coast Highway" (Two Friends featuring Max)	2017	—	—	—	Out of Love
"Fight for You" (Pluko featuring Max)	2017	—	—	—	Non-album singles
"Do You Still Feel?" (Rain Man featuring Max)	2017	—	—	—	Non-album singles
"Indestructible" (Not Your Dope featuring Max)	2017	—	—	—	Non-album singles
"Square One" (Grandtheft featuring Max)	2017	—	—	—	Non-album singles
"Lonely" (Matoma featuring Max)	2018	43	— (Note: "Lonely" did not enter the Swedish Singellista Chart, but peaked at number 17 on the Swedish Heatseeker Chart.)	—	One in a Million
"Satisfied" (Galantis featuring Max)	2018	22	85	39	Non-album singles
"Bad Boy" (Yung Bae featuring Wiz Khalifa, Bbno$ and Max)	2020	—	—	—	Non-album singles
"Set Me Free" (Oliver Heldens and Party Pupils featuring Max)	2020	40	—	36	Non-album singles
"Obsessed" (Ayumu Imazu featuring Max)	2024	—	—	—	Non-album singles
"—" denotes releases that did not chart or were not released in that territory.

=== Promotional singles ===
List of promotional singles, with selected chart positions, showing year released and album name
Title	Year	Peak chart positions	Album
Title	Year	US Kid	Album
"Me and You Against the World" (Rags cast featuring Keke Palmer and Max Schneider)	2012	2	Rags
"Tonight You're Perfect"	2014	—	Non-album promotional single
"Streets of Gold"	2014	—	NWL
"Shot of Pure Gold"	2014	—	NWL
"Puppeteer"	2015	—	NWL
"Christina's Song"	2016	—	Non-album promotional singles
"Meteor"	2017	—	Non-album promotional singles
"Gucci Bag"	2022	—	Love In Stereo
"Edie Celine"	2023	—	Love In Stereo
"—" denotes releases that did not chart or were not released in that territory.

== Other charted songs ==
List of other charted songs, with selected chart positions, showing year released and album name
Title	Year	Peak chart positions								Album
Title	Year	US Dig.	US Dance Elec.	US Kid	US Rap Dig.	US WW	HUN	NZ Hot	UK	Album
"Someday" (Rags cast featuring Max Schneider)	2012	—	—	1	—	—	—	—	—	Rags
"Nothing Gets Better Than This" (Rags cast featuring Max Schneider)	2012	—	—	12	—	—	—	—	—	Rags
"Hands Up" (Rags cast featuring Max Schneider)	2012	—	—	3	—	—	—	—	—	Rags
"Perfect Harmony" (Rags cast featuring Keke Palmer and Max Schneider)	2012	—	—	17	—	—	—	—	—	Rags
"Not So Different at All" (Rags cast featuring Max Schneider)	2012	—	—	10	—	—	—	—	—	Rags
"Beautiful Creatures" (Illenium featuring Max)	2017	—	32	—	—	—	—	—	—	Awake
"The Other Side" (with Ty Dolla Sign)	2018	—	—	—	—	—	—	39	84	The Greatest Showman: Reimagined
"Burn It" (Agust D featuring Max)	2020	12	—	*	5	3	11	—	—	D-2
"—" denotes releases that did not chart or were not released in that territory. "*" denotes the chart did not exist at that time.

== Guest appearances ==
List of non-single guest appearances, showing other artist(s), year released and album name
Title	Year	Other artist(s)	Album
"Things Aren't Always What They Seem"	2012	Rags cast, Keke Palmer	Rags
"Stick Up"	2014	None	Veronica Mars
"Mug Shot"	2014	None	Veronica Mars
"Won't Mind"	2014	Hoodie Allen	People Keep Talking
"Against Me"	2014	Hoodie Allen	People Keep Talking
"Losing You"	2017	Witt Lowry	I Could Not Plan This
"Revival"	2018	Sigala, Cheat Codes	Brighter Days
"Special Delivery"	2023	Meghan Trainor	Takin' It Back

== Songwriting credits ==
Title	Year	Artist	Album
"Kills You Slowly"	2019	The Chainsmokers	World War Joy
"Nobody"	2022	Bryce Vine	Non-album single
"Yet to Come (The Most Beautiful Moment)"	2022	BTS	Proof
"Happily Ever After"	2023	Tomorrow X Together	The Name Chapter: Freefall
"Whatever"	2023	Walk off the Earth	Stand By You
"Cheetah"	2023	Jackson Wang	Non-album single
"Classic"	2024	DearALICE	Made in Korea: The K-Pop Experience
"I'll Be There"	2024	Jin	Happy
"Classic"	2024	Stell	Room
"Feel the Pop"	2024	Zerobaseone	You Had Me at Hello
"Guy I Used to Be"	2024	Lawrence	Family Business
"BFF"	2024	TWS	Sparkling Blue
"Think I'm Falling"	2025	Yung Kai	Stay with the Ocean, I'll Find You
"Gravity" (with Song Ha-young)	2025	Lee Hyun	A(E)ND
"Too Close"	2025	Enhypen	Desire: Unleash
"Adult Swim"	2025	Kai	Wait on Me
"Hate That I Made You Love Me"	2026	Ariana Grande	Petal

== As Party Pupils ==
=== EP ===
List of EPs, with selected details
Title	Album details
Neon from Now On	Released: May 15, 2020; Labels: Colour Vision; Format: Digital download

=== Compilations albums ===
List of independent albums, with track listings
Title	Album details
Now That's What I Call Future Funk (DJ Mix)	Released: April 1, 2019; Label: Dubset Media; Formats: digital download; Track listing: 1. "Milkshake (Party Pupils Unofficial Remix) [Mixed]"; 2. "From the Back [Mixed]" (with Pat Lok featuring Dances With White Girls); 3. "Love Me for the Weekend (Mixed)" (with Max and Ashe); 4. "Sax On the Beach (Mixed)"(with Max); 5. "Gettin Jiggy Wit It (Party Pupils Unofficial Remix) [Mixed]"; 6. "My Love (Party Pupils Unofficial Remix) [Mixed]"; 7. "No Scrubs (Party Pupils Unofficial Remix) [Mixed]"; 8. "That Thing (Doo Wop) [Party Pupils Remix] [Mixed]"; 9. "Can't Believe It (Party Pupils Unofficial Remix) [Mixed]"; 10. "Buy U a Drank (Party Pupils x unheard Unofficial Remix) [Mixed]"

=== Singles ===
==== As lead artists ====
Title	Year	Peak chart positions		Album
Title	Year	US Dance Elec.	NZ Hot	Album
"Ms. Jackson"	2016	—	—	Non-album singles
"Pony"	2016	—	—	Non-album singles
"Patient"	2017	—	—	Non-album singles
"Over & Under"	2017	—	—	Non-album singles
"This Is How We Do It" (featuring Audien)	2018	—	—	Non-album singles
"Sax on the Beach" (with Max)	2018	—	—	Neon from Now On
"Love Me for the Weekend" (with Max and Ashe)	2018	—	—	Neon from Now On
"Bite My Tongue"	2019	—	—	Neon from Now On
"One Two Things" (with Louis Futon featuring Tobi)	2019	—	—	Neon from Now On
"The Plug" (featuring Drelli)	2019	—	—	Neon from Now On
"West Coast Tears" (featuring Gary Go)	2020	—	—	Neon from Now On
"Set Me Free" (with Oliver Heldens featuring Max)	2020	40	36	Non-album single
"So Fine" (with Pat Lok)	2021	—	—	TBA
"Signs" (featuring Marc E. Bassy)	2021	—	—	TBA
"I Want You" (with Pat Lok)	2021	—	—	TBA
"Alaska" (with Pat Lok)	2021	—	—	TBA
"Renegade" (with Big Gigantic)	2022	—	—	TBA
"Break It Down"	2022	—	—	TBA
"Girlfriend" (Party Pupils, bbno$, MAX featuring Milli)	2023	—	—	TBA
"Pleasure"	2024	—	—	Non-album single
"We Aight" (Ric Wilson, Party Pupils, Brasstracks featuring Mayer Hawthorne)	2024	—	—	Non-album single
"—" denotes releases that did not chart or were not released in that territory.

==== As featured artists ====
Title	Year
"Me No Evil" (Party Pupils remix) (Abhi the Nomad featuring Party Pupils)	2020
"I Miss the Days" (GALAXARA featuring Party Pupils)	2020
"Good Tonight" (Party Pupils remix) (Daniel Pemberton featuring Anthony Ramos & Party Pupils)	2022
"Me Without You" (Kaleena Zanders & Party Pupils)	2022

=== Guest appearances ===
List of non-single guest appearances, showing other artist(s), year released and album name
Title	Year	Other artist(s)	Album
"I Want You" (Party Pupils Remix)	2017	Robotaki, Manila Killa, Matthew John Kurz	I Want You (Remixes) - EP
"Holla" (Party Pupils Remix)	2017	MAX, Mod Sun	Non-album singles
"Feels Great" (Party Pupils Remix)	2017	Cheat Codes, Fetty Wap, CVBZ	Non-album singles
"Juice" (Party Pupils Remix)	2017	Chromeo	Non-album singles
"I Got You" (Party Pupils Remix)	2017	Bebe Rexha	I Got You: The Remixes - EP
"Old School" (Party Pupils Remix)	2017	Urban Cove	Old School (Remixes) - EP
"Glory Days" (Party Pupils Remix)	2017	Sweater Beats, Hayley Kiyoko	Glory Days(Remixes) - EP
"This Is How We Do It" (Mix Version)	2018	Steve Aoki	Steve Aoki Presents: 5oki (DJ Mix)
"Lonely" (Party Pupils Remix)	2018	Matoma, MAX	Lonely (Remixes)
"Church" (Party Pupils Remix)	2018	Alison Wonderland	Church (The Remixes)
"Still New York" (Party Pupils Remix)	2018	MAX, Joey Bada$$	Still New York (Remixes)
"8 Letters" (Party Pupils Remix)	2018	Why Don't We	8 Letters (Remixes)
"Sober Up" (Party Pupils Remix)	2018	AJR, Rivers Cuomo	Sober Up (Remixes) (feat. Rivers Cuomo)
"My Boy" (Party Pupils Remix)	2019	Billie Eilish	Non-album single
"Love Me Less" (Party Pupils Remix)	2019	MAX, Quinn XCII	Love Me Less (Remixes) - EP
"No Scrubs" (TLC) (Party Pupils Unofficial Remix)	2019	TLC	Non-album singles
"Buy U a Drank (Shawty Snappin')" (Party Pupils x Unheard Unofficial Remix)	2019	T-Pain, Yung Joc, Unheard	Non-album singles
"Fell in Love"	2019	Yung Bae	Bae 5
"Checklist (Party Pupils Remix)"	2020	MAX, Chromeo	Non-album singles
"Stick Up Kids"	2020	Bad Rabbits	Non-album singles
"Friends" (Party Pupils Remix)	2020	Big Gigantic, Ashe	Free Your Mind (Deluxe Edition)
"Where Am I At" (Party Pupils Remix)	2020	MAX	Non-album single
"The Bender" (Party Pupils Remix)	2020	Matoma	The Bender (Remixes)
"Missed Calls" (Party Pupils Remix)	2020	MAX, Hayley Kiyoko	Non-album single
"I Don't Know Why" (Party Pupils Remix)	2020	NOTD, Astrid S	I Don't Know Why (Remixes)
"Burn It" (Party Pupils Remix)	2020	MAX, Agust D	Non-album singles
"In the Water (Party Pupils Remix)"	2021	CAL, Quinn XCII	Non-album singles
"Butterflies (Party Pupils Remix)"	2021	MAX, Ali Gatie	Non-album singles
"Talk About Love (Party Pupils Remix)"	2024	Kate Hudson	Non-album singles
