= Colour Vision (album) =

Studio album by MAX
- Released: September 18, 2020
- Genre: Pop
- Length: 33:42
- Label: Colour Vision

MAX chronology
Hell's Kitchen Angel (2016)	Colour Vision (2020)	Love in Stereo (2024)

Singles from Colour Vision
- 1. "Love Me Less" Released: April 5, 2019; 2. "Acid Dreams" Released: July 19, 2019; 3. "Checklist" Released: November 1, 2019; 4. "Where Am I At" Released: February 18, 2020; 5. "Missed Calls" Released: May 1, 2020; 6. "Working for the Weekend" Released: August 14, 2020; 7. "Blueberry Eyes" Released: September 15, 2020

Colour Vision is the third studio album by American singer MAX, released on September 18, 2020, through Colour Vision Records. A primarily pop record, the album is the singer's first in four years since Hell's Kitchen Angel, and was conceived following a 2018 surgery to remove polyps from his vocal cords. During recovery, he was unable to sing for a period of four months and developed a renewed outlook towards music in that time, which resulted in a more personal approach to his writing than before. Thematically, the album deals with love and relationships, and was heavily inspired by the singer's marriage with his wife Emily.

== Track listing ==
Standard edition
No.	Title	Writer(s)	Producer(s)	Length
1.	"Colour Vision"	Rogét Chahayed; Imad Royal; Max Schneider; Nolan Sipe	Imad Royal; Rogét Chahayed	2:15
2.	"Working for the Weekend" (featuring bbno$)	Jack Met; Ryan Met; Schneider	Ryan Met	2:45
3.	"Love Me Less" (featuring Quinn XCII)	Chahayed; Royal; Schneider; Sipe; Mike Temrowski	Royal; Chahayed	2:57
4.	"Acid Dreams" (featuring Felly)	Christian Felner; Alexander Lewis; Ivan Rosenberg; Schneider; Ryan Siegel	Party Pupils; Alexander Lewis	3:03
5.	"Circles"	Scott Harris; Schneider	Scott Harris; Jonah Shy	2:27
6.	"Blueberry Eyes" (featuring Suga of BTS)	Chahayed; Min Yoon-gi; Michael Pollack; Royal; Schneider	Royal; Chahayed	2:52
7.	"Where Am I At"	Alex Seaver; Schneider	Alex Seaver	3:29
8.	"New Life"	Chahayed; Royal; Schneider; Sipe	Royal; Chahayed	3:01
9.	"Checklist" (featuring Chromeo)	Chahayed; Sean Douglas; Sam Fischer; Patrick Gemayel; David Macklovitch; Royal; Schneider	Chromeo; Royal; Chahayed	2:16
10.	"Missed Calls" (featuring Hayley Kiyoko)	Hayley Kiyoko; Schneider; Johnny Simpson; Jake Torrey	Johnny Simpson	2:34
11.	"SOS"	Chahayed; Royal; Amir Salim; Schneider	Royal; Chahayed	2:41
12.	"There is a God"	Chahayed; Royal; Schneider; Sipe	Royal; Chahayed; Ryan Siegel	3:16
Total length:				33:42

Deluxe edition
No.	Title	Writer(s)	Producer(s)	Length
13.	"Still New York" (featuring Joey Badass)		Oak; M-Phazes	3:44
14.	"Worship"	Frederic Kennett; Robert Hauldren; Royal; Schneider	Max; Royal; Chahayed	3:07
15.	"Blueberry Eyes" (featuring Lil Mosey, Suga of BTS, and Olivia O'Brien)		Royal; Chahayed	2:52
16.	"Love Me Less" (featuring Kim Petras)	Chahayed; Royal; Schneider; Sipe; Petras	Royal; Chahayed	2:57
17.	"Acid Dreams" (featuring Felly; Acoustic version)		Siegel	2:51
18.	"There is a God" (Acoustic version)	Chahayed; Royal; Schneider; Sipe	Siegel	3:03
19.	"Love Me Less" (featuring Quinn XCII; Acoustic version)		Siegel	3:03
20.	"Blueberry Eyes" (Steve Aoki Remix)		Royal; Chahayed	3:16
21.	"Working for the Weekend" (featuring EAJ; Party Pupils Remix)		Met	2:33
22.	"Love Me Less" (featuring Quinn XCII; Party Pupils Remix)		Royal; Chahayed	3:05
Total length:				60:04

== Charts ==
Chart (2020)	Peak position
US Billboard 200	137
US Heatseekers Albums (Billboard)	1
US Independent Albums (Billboard)	27
