= UDK =

UDK may refer to:

- Berlin University of the Arts, from German Universität der Künste Berlin, UdK
- UEFI Development Kit
- Unreal Development Kit, the freely available development kit for Unreal Engine 3
- Universal Decimal Classification, from Croatian Univerzalna decimalna klasifikacija
- "UDK", a song by Olivia O'Brien from her 2019 album Was It Even Real?
- The University Daily Kansan, the student newspaper of the University of Kansas
