= Gibberish (disambiguation) =

Gibberish is speech that at least appears to be nonsense.

Gibberish may also refer to:

- Gibberish (game), a language game
- "Gibberish" (song), a song by MAX
- "Gibberish", a song by Relient K from the album Two Lefts Don't Make a Right...but Three Do
- "Gibberish!!" the intro theme for the fifth season of the animated web series Battle For Dream Island, "The Power of Two"
