= Radio Disney Music Award for Best Breakup Song =

Annual US music award

The following is a list of Radio Disney Music Award winners and nominees for Best Breakup Song.Taylor Swift is the only artist to win this award twice.

== Winners and nominees ==
=== 2010s ===
Year	Winner	Nominees	Ref.
2013	"We Are Never Ever Getting Back Together" – Taylor Swift	"Want U Back" – Cher Lloyd; "Payphone" – Maroon 5 featuring Wiz Khalifa; "Wide Awake" – Katy Perry	
2014	Unrealized		
2015	"The Heart Wants What It Wants" - Selena Gomez	"Really Don't Care" - Demi Lovato feat. Cher Lloyd; "Heartbreak Heard Around the World" - Jacob Latimore feat. T-Pain	
2016	"Bad Blood" - Taylor Swift	"Hello - Adele; "Sorry" - Justin Bieber; "Stitches" - Shawn Mendes	
2017	"Shout Out to My Ex" - Little Mix	"Sorry - Justin Bieber; "We Don't Talk Anymore" - Charlie Puth ft. Selena Gomez; "i hate u, i love u" - gnash ft. Olivia O'Brien; "Make Me (Cry)" - Noah Cyrus ft. Labrinth	
