= Hell's Kitchen Angel =

2016 studio album by MAX

Studio album by MAX
- Released: April 8, 2016
- Recorded: 2015–16
- Genre: Pop; pop rock
- Length: 33:38
- Label: DCD2; Crush

MAX chronology
Wrong (2015)	Hell's Kitchen Angel (2016)	Lights Down Low (2016)

Singles from Hell's Kitchen Angel
- 1. "Gibberish" Released: March 23, 2015; 2. "Wrong" Released: December 18, 2015; 3. "Holla" Released: February 26, 2016; 4. "Basement Party" Released: April 1, 2016; 5. "Lights Down Low" Released: October 14, 2016

Hell's Kitchen Angel is the second studio album by American singer MAX, released on April 8, 2016, through DCD2 Records and Crush Music. The album contains ten tracks, including the 2015 single "Gibberish", and sleeper hit "Lights Down Low", which went on to become an Adult Top 40 number-one and earned Platinum certification from the Recording Industry Association of America (RIAA) for selling over one million copies.

== Background and release ==
The album's title is a "[nod] to MAX's childhood Manhattan neighborhood", Hell's Kitchen. It was released through Pete Wentz's DCD2 Records label, with whom the singer signed the year prior. The album's sounds are inspired by his "appreciation for the punk rock mentality" and pairs "his lithe tenor with an innate sense of soulful pop".

== Singles ==
"Gibberish" (featuring Hoodie Allen) was released as the lead single from the album on March 23, 2015.

"Wrong" (featuring Lil Uzi Vert) was released as the second single from the album on December 18, 2015.

"Holla" was released as the third single from the album on February 26, 2016. The music video was released the day prior to the song's release.

"Basement Party" was released as the fourth single from the album on April 1, 2016. The official video was released on June 22, 2016.

== Songs ==
MAX released the single, "Mug Shot," on February 24, 2014, later included on his second EP, The Say Max EP, and debut studio album NWL. A remixed version, featuring vocals from American rapper Sirah, is included on Hell's Kitchen Angel.

On March 25, 2015, "Gibberish" featuring American rapper Hoodie Allen, was released as a single from his third EP Ms. Anonymous, along with the music video. The song is included on Hell's Kitchen Angel.

On December 18, 2015, "Wrong" featuring American rapper Lil Uzi Vert, was released from his fourth EP, Wrong. The music video was released along with the song. The song is included on Hell's Kitchen Angel.

"Lights Down Low" was originally released as a promotional single from the album on March 11, 2016. The song was later released as a standalone single on October 14, 2016, this time, featuring vocals from American singer gnash. Its official video was released the previous day.

== Track listing ==
Standard edition

No.	Title	Writer(s)	Producer(s)	Length
1.	"Hell's Kitchen Angel"	Morgan Kibby; Max Schneider; Jacob Sinclair; Michael Viola	Sinclair	3:43
2.	"Gibberish" (featuring Hoodie Allen)	Hoodie Allen; Sean Douglas; Jonas Jeberg; Morgan Taylor Reid	Jeberg	3:23
3.	"Wrong" (featuring Lil Uzi Vert)	Amir Salem; Schneider; Symere Woods	Azeem	3:15
4.	"Holla"	Edward Cameron; Nate Cyphert; Kevin Fisher; Schneider	Ned Cameron	3:02
5.	"Lights Down Low"	Nathaniel Motte; Liam O'Donnell; Schneider	Motte	3:43
6.	"10 Victoria's Secret Models"	Patrick Stump; Schneider	Stump	3:46
7.	"Home"	AJR; Schneider	Metzger	3:08
8.	"Mug Shot" (featuring Sirah)	John Colley; Sara Mitchell; Schneider; Sinclair; Viola	Sinclair	2:54
9.	"Basement Party"	Jonathan Bellion; Douglas; Schneider; Andreas Schuller	Axident	3:21
10.	"Lost My Way"	Schneider; Edvard Egilsson; Jean-Robert Redwine; Fisher; Nick Rosen	Red Wine	3:23
Total length:				33:38

== Charts ==
Chart (2018)	Peak position
US Billboard 200	154

== Release history ==
Release history for Hell's Kitchen Angel
Region	Date	Format(s)	Label	Ref.
Various	April 8, 2016	Digital download; streaming	DCD2; Crush	
Japan	July 25, 2018	Digital download; CD; streaming	DCD2; Crush	
