= Olivia O'Brien =

American singer-songwriter (born 1999)

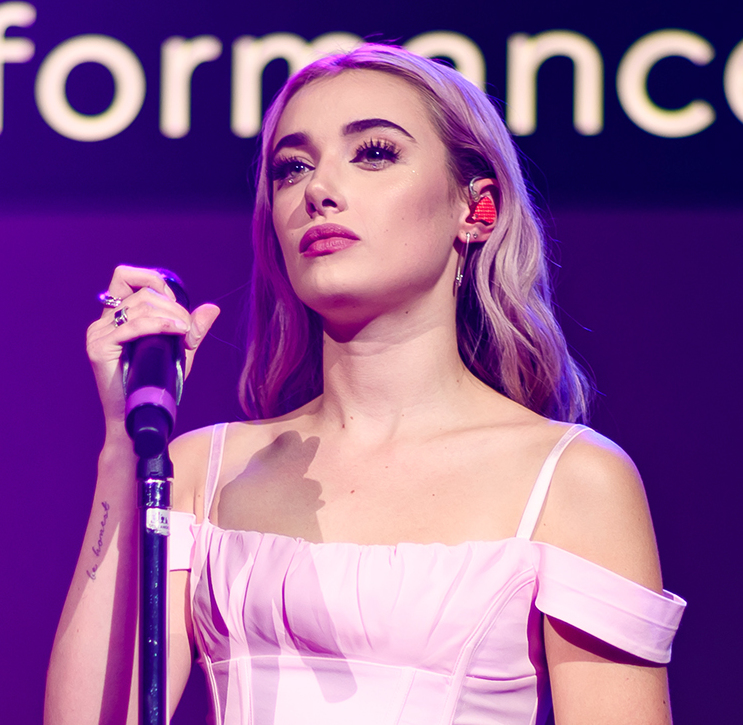
- O'Brien in 2019

Background information
- Born: Olivia Gail O'Brien; November 26, 1999 (age 26); Thousand Oaks, California, U.S.
- Genres: Pop; R&B
- Occupations: Singer; songwriter
- Years active: 2013–present
- Labels: Gamma; Island; Girlhood
- Website: oliviaobrienmusic.com

Olivia Gail O'Brien (born November 26, 1999) is an American singer-songwriter. She is best known for her guest appearance on Gnash's 2016 single "I Hate U, I Love U", which peaked at number 10 on the Billboard Hot 100. Its success led her to sign with Island Records; the label released two extended plays, three mixtapes, and her debut studio album Was It Even Real? (2019). In 2024, she formed the independent label Girlhood Records and released the EPs Love & Limerence and Everywhere I Go, There I Am. O'Brien signed with Gamma for the release of her second studio album Pixie (2026).

== Early life ==
Olivia Gail O'Brien was born on November 26, 1999, in Thousand Oaks, California. She has been singing since she was seven years old, and taught herself to play guitar and piano. She attended Justin-Siena High School in Napa, California. She also skipped third grade and attended Montessori and Catholic schools in her youth. O'Brien also was bullied as a teenager, some of it stemming from her social class and the fact she was creating music.

== Career ==
=== 2013–2019: Breakthrough and Was It Even Real? ===
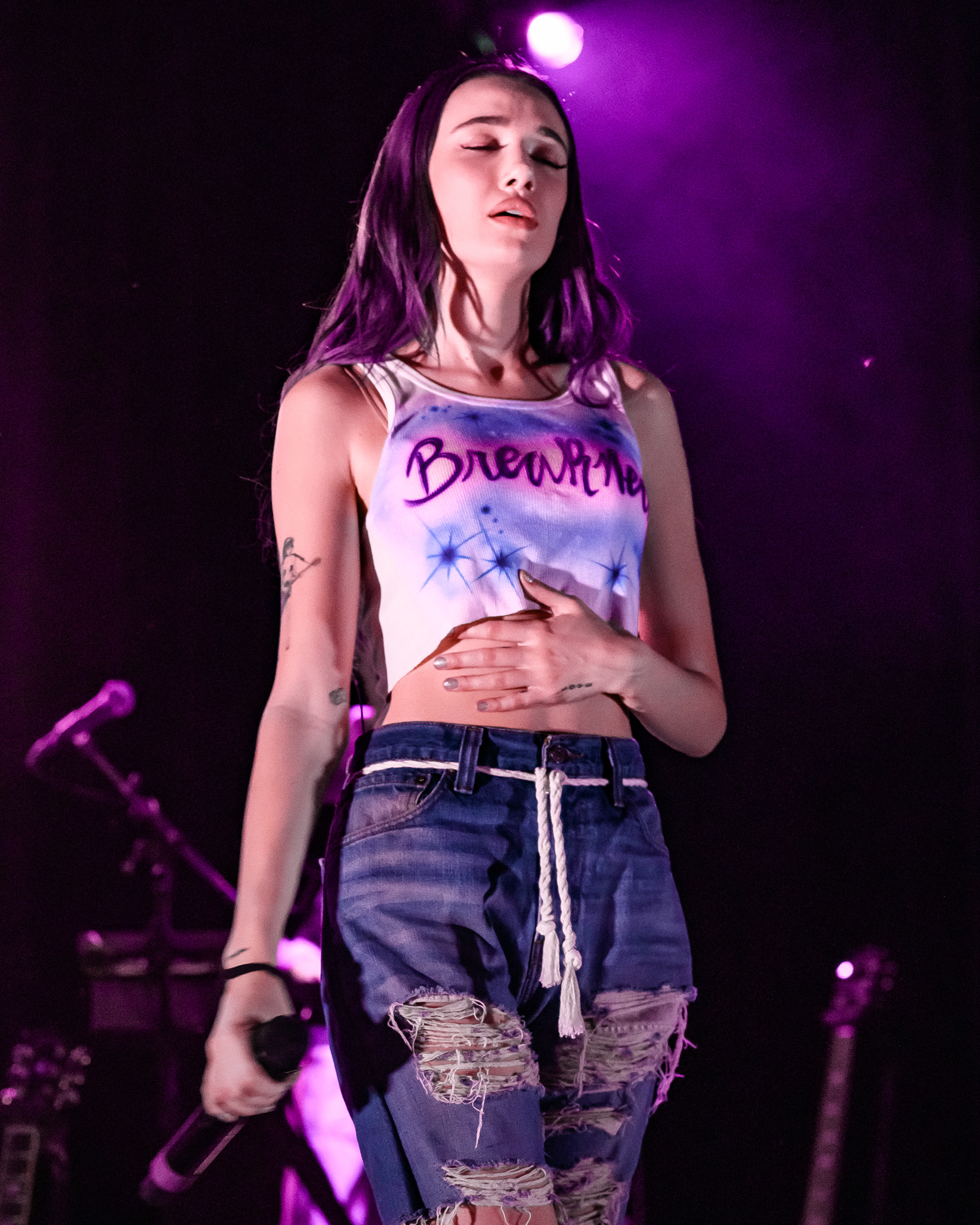
O'Brien performing in Los Angeles in 2019.

O'Brien initially gained the attention of Gnash after posting a cover of one of his songs on SoundCloud. Gnash contacted O'Brien and asked her to send him original material. She subsequently sent him a voice note of her original song, "I Hate U, I Love U", and he invited her to record the song with him in Los Angeles. Released in March 2016, the song appeared on Gnash's third EP, Us. The single peaked at number 10 on the Billboard Hot 100 and reached number one in Australia. Thereafter, O'Brien signed with Island Records and released her debut solo single, "Trust Issues", in August 2016. O'Brien made her television debut in July 2016 with Gnash performing "I Hate U, I Love U" on Late Night with Seth Meyers.

In March 2017, O'Brien was nominated for an iHeartRadio Music Award for Best Solo Breakout. Her debut extended play, It's Not That Deep, was released in November 2017. In 2018, O'Brien collaborated with Jack & Jack on the acoustic version of "Beg" and with G-Eazy and Drew Love on a remix of "RIP". Her debut studio album, Was It Even Real?, was released on April 26, 2019. In May 2019, O'Brien collaborated with the Norwegian group Seeb on "Fade Out".

=== 2019–2023: Micromixtapes and Episodes ===
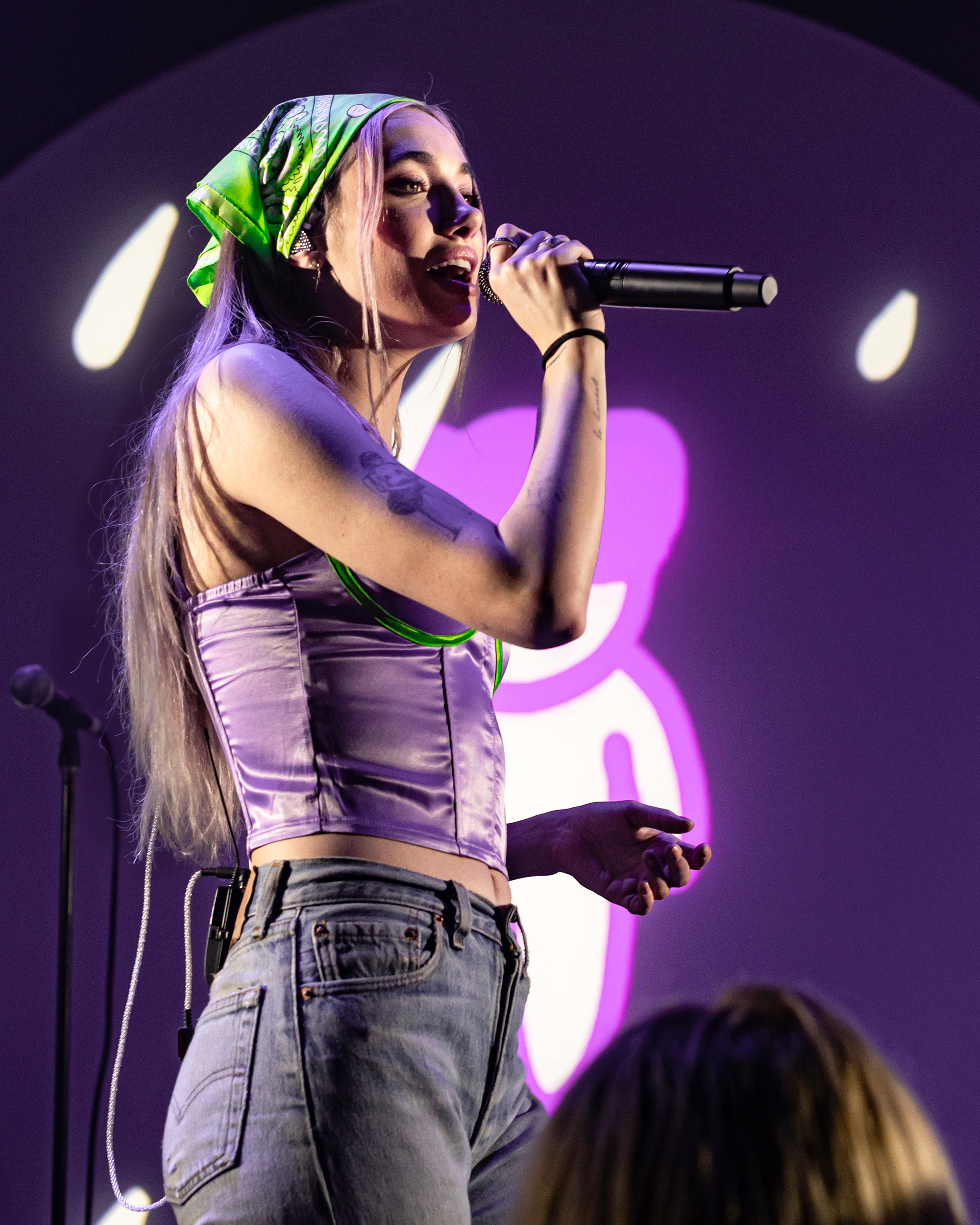
O'Brien performing in Orlando in 2020.

On November 15, 2019, O'Brien released It Was a Sad Fucking Summer, the first in a planned series of "micro-mixtapes" leading to her next album. She announced the It Was a Sad F**king Tour, which was scheduled to begin in February 2020. On February 6, 2020, she released her second micro-mixtape, The Results Of My Poor Judgement. O'Brien was scheduled to perform at Coachella Festival in April 2020, but the festival was canceled due to the COVID-19 pandemic. A track from The Results Of My Poor Judgement, "Josslyn", gained popularity on TikTok, subsequently receiving radio airplay. O'Brien released a music video for the song on May 8, 2020, followed by a remix featuring 24kGoldn.

On September 18, 2020, O'Brien released a single titled "Now". She released "Better Than Feeling Lonely" on January 1, 2021. On April 9, 2021, O'Brien released "Sociopath" as the lead single from a planned second studio album. The first part of the project, Episodes: Season 1, was released on June 11, 2021, and featured Oli Sykes on the track "No More Friends". O'Brien supported the project with the Olivia O'Brien Show tour later that year. She later canceled plans to release the second part of the project, stating that she did not want to focus on making a project and instead wanted to release individual songs.

O'Brien performing in Washington, D.C. in October 2026.

=== 2023–present: Independent releases and Pixie ===
In 2023, O'Brien parted ways with Island Records and began releasing music independently. In 2024, she launched her independent record label, Girlhood Records, and released the extended plays Love & Limerence and Everywhere I Go, There I Am. In March 2026, O'Brien announced that she had signed with Gamma for her second studio album, Pixie. She was later announced as the opening act for Benson Boone's 2026 Wanted Man Tour. Pixie, was released on July 17, 2026, preceded by the singles, "Icarus", "I'm Perfect", "The Masochist", and "I Always Say I'm Leaving".

== Personal life ==
O'Brien came out as bisexual via Twitter in July 2022.

== Discography ==
=== Studio albums ===
| Title | Details |
|---|---|
| Was It Even Real? | Released: April 26, 2019; Label: Island; Format: CD, LP, digital download, streaming |
| Pixie | Scheduled: July 17, 2026; Label: Gamma; Format: CD, LP, digital download, streaming |

=== Extended plays ===
| Title | Details |
|---|---|
| It's Not That Deep | Released: November 17, 2017; Label: Island; Format: Digital download, streaming |
| Episodes: Season 1 | Released: June 11, 2021; Label: Island; Format: Digital download, streaming |
| Love & Limerence | Released: June 21, 2024; Label: Girlhood; Format: Digital download, streaming |
| Everywhere I Go, There I Am | Released: November 15, 2024; Label: Girlhood; Format: Digital download, streaming |

=== Mixtapes ===
| Title | Details |
|---|---|
| It Was A Sad Fucking Summer | Released: November 15, 2019; Label: Island; Format: CD, digital download, streaming |
| The Results Of My Poor Judgement | Released: February 7, 2020; Label: Island; Format: Digital download, streaming |
| A Means to An End | Released: November 18, 2022; Label: Island; Format: Digital download, streaming |

=== Singles ===
==== As lead artist ====
List of singles as lead artist, with selected chart positions, showing year released and album name
| Title | Year | Peak chart positions | | Certifications | Album |
| Title | Year | US | NZ Hot | Certifications | Album |
|---|---|---|---|---|---|
| "Empty" | 2017 | — | — | | It's Not That Deep |
| "RIP" (solo or featuring G-Eazy and Drew Love) | 2017 | — | — | | It's Not That Deep |
| "I Don't Exist" | 2018 | — | — | | Was It Even Real? |
| "Care Less More" | 2018 | — | — | | Was It Even Real? |
| "Love Myself" (solo or featuring Jesse) | 2019 | — | — | | Was It Even Real? |
| "Just a Boy" | 2019 | — | — | | Was It Even Real? |
| "Fade Out" (with Seeb and Space Primates) | 2019 | — | — | | Sad in Scandinavia |
| "Josslyn" (solo or with 24kGoldn) | 2020 | — | — | RIAA: Gold | The Results Of My Poor Judgement |
| "Now" | 2020 | — | 28 | | Non-album single |
| "Better Than Feeling Lonely" | 2021 | — | 17 | | Non-album single |
| "Sociopath" | 2021 | — | — | | Episodes: Season 1 |
| "No More Friends" (with Oliver Sykes of Bring Me the Horizon) | 2021 | — | — | | Episodes: Season 1 |
| "Bitches These Days" | 2022 | — | — | | Non-album single |
| "Caught Up" (with Gryffin) | 2022 | — | — | | Alive |
| "Bitch Back" (with Fletcher) | 2022 | — | — | | Non-album singles |
| "I Should've Fucked Your Brother" | 2023 | — | — | | Non-album singles |
| "Bandaid On a Bullet Hole" | 2023 | — | — | | Non-album singles |
| "Blip" | 2024 | — | — | | Love & Limerence |
| "Glimpse of Me" | 2024 | — | — | | Love & Limerence |
| "Out Of Your League (But I Want You So Bad)" | 2024 | — | — | | Love & Limerence |
| "Icarus" | 2026 | — | — | | Pixie |
| "I'm Perfect" | 2026 | — | — | | Pixie |
| "The Masochist" | 2026 | — | — | | Pixie |
| "I Always Say I'm Leaving" | 2026 | — | — | | Pixie |
"—" denotes a recording that did not chart or was not released in that territory.

==== As featured artist ====
List of singles as featured artist, with selected chart positions and certifications, showing year released and album name
| Title | Year | Peak chart positions | | | | | | | | | | Certifications | Album |
| Title | Year | US | AUS | AUT | BEL | CAN | DEN | ITA | NZ | SWE | UK | Certifications | Album |
|---|---|---|---|---|---|---|---|---|---|---|---|---|---|
| "I Hate U, I Love U" (Gnash featuring Olivia O'Brien) | 2016 | 10 | 1 | 9 | 3 | 22 | 29 | 14 | 9 | 15 | 7 | RIAA: 6× Platinum; ARIA: 2× Platinum; BEA: Platinum; BPI: 2× Platinum; FIMI: Gold; IFPI DEN: Gold; MC: Platinum; RMNZ: Platinum | us |
| "Ringtone" (Diamond White featuring Olivia O'Brien) | 2018 | — | — | — | — | — | — | — | — | — | — | | Non-album single |
| "Might Die Young" (Bobby Brackins featuring Olivia O'Brien and Tinashe) | 2018 | — | — | — | — | — | — | — | — | — | — | | To Kill For |
| "Blueberry Eyes" (MAX featuring Olivia O'Brien, Suga and Lil Mosey) | 2021 | — | — | — | — | — | — | — | — | — | — | | Colour Vision (Deluxe) |
| "Claim" (Drumaq featuring Olivia O'Brien) | 2022 | — | — | — | — | — | — | — | — | — | — | | Non-album single |
"—" denotes a recording that did not chart or was not released in that territory.

==== Promotional singles ====
| Title | Year | Certifications | Album |
|---|---|---|---|
| "Complicated" | 2015 | BPI: Silver | Non-album promotional single |
| "Trust Issues" | 2016 | | Non-album promotional single |
| "Root Beer Float" (featuring Blackbear) | 2016 | | Non-album promotional single |
| "Find What You're Looking For" | 2016 | | Non-album promotional single |
| "Tequilawine" | 2017 | | It's Not That Deep |
| "No Love" | 2017 | | It's Not That Deep |
| "UDK" | 2018 | | Was It Even Real? |
| "Just Friends" | 2019 | | Was It Even Real? |

=== Songwriting credits ===
| Song | Year | Artist(s) | Album |
|---|---|---|---|
| "Fuckboy" | 2021 | Dixie D'Amelio | Non-album single |

== Awards and nominations ==
| Year | Award | Category | Work | Result |
|---|---|---|---|---|
| 2017 | iHeart Radio Music Awards | Best Solo Breakout | Herself | Nominated |
| 2017 | Radio Disney Music Awards | Best Breakup Song | "i hate u, i love u" | Nominated |
