= Felly =

American singer-songwriter (born 1995)

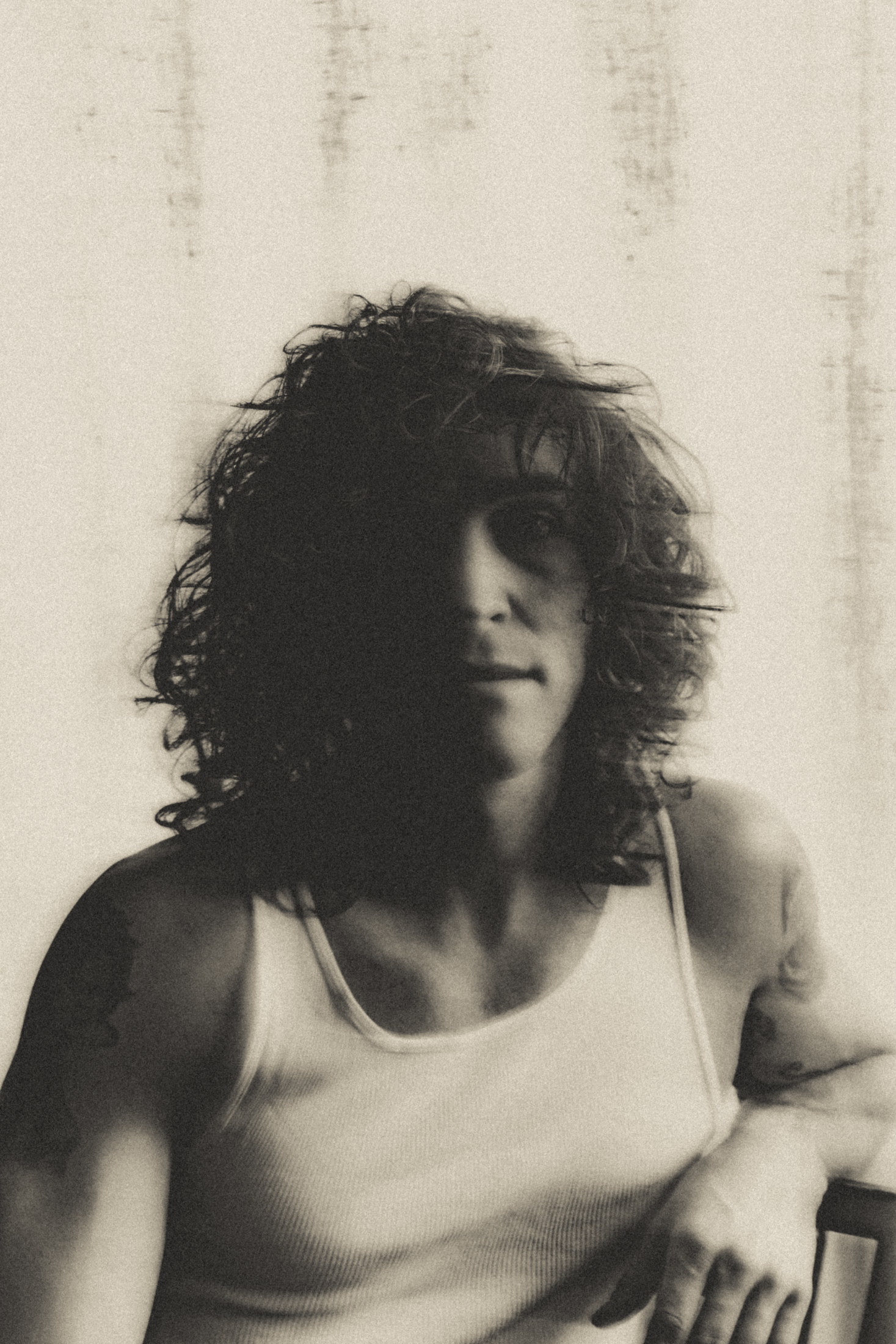
- Felly in 2025

Background information
- Born: Christian Robert Felner; September 2, 1995 (age 30); Trumbull, Connecticut, U.S.
- Genres: Indie; Alternative; Rock; Hip Hop
- Occupations: Musician; Songwriter; Singer; Producer
- Instruments: Vocals; piano; guitar
- Years active: 2013–present
- Label: Independent
- Website: www.fellymusic.com

Christian Robert Felner (known professionally as Felly) is an American indie artist, singer, songwriter, and record producer from Connecticut who is independently releasing music after a few major label releases with 300 Entertainment and Same Plate (a division of Sony Music). He has released numerous EPs, mixtapes, and albums. His most recent release is Ambroxyde, a studio album released on June 27, 2025

== Early life and education ==
Christian Felner was born and grew up in Trumbull, Connecticut. He graduated high school from Fairfield College Preparatory School in Fairfield, Connecticut, in 2013. He began releasing music while still in high school, and also built a following on YouTube by making and selling beats.

After graduating, he went on to attend the University of Southern California (USC) where he studied music. While in college, Felly founded 2273 Records with fellow USC attendees Jake Standley and Gyyps (with whom Felly frequently collaborates). He graduated from USC in 2017.

== Career ==
While still attending USC, Felly released several mixtapes and an EP. His first project to receive major attention came in May 2014 with the release of Waking Up To Sirens, which featured the single "Fabrics". This led to an appearance as an opener for Madlib. He followed that with a second mixtape, Milk & Sugar, which was released in November 2014. That collection featured a guest appearance from Ari Lennox on the track, "Tell Me". His third mixtape, This Shit Comes in Waves, was released in July 2015, and featured the single "7th King". That song was the namesake for his 2016 tour (the "7th King Tour") which ran for 21 dates in the U.S.

In July 2016, Felly released an EP entitled, Young Fel, and embarked on another tour in support of it. That collection featured the single "Desert Eagle" (featuring Gyyps), for which Felly filmed a music video. In 2017, he would embark on the "Mermaid Gang" tour, which was named after the group formed by Felly, Gyyps, and Trip Carter. All three members performed on stage during the 40-date tour. Throughout 2017, Felly released numerous songs including "Ali", "Baby Boy", "Fight the Feeling", "Delta Deathbus to Zion" (featuring Peter $un), "Hotel Room", "Keep The Team Straight", and numerous others. Some of the tracks were part of a summer series called New Flavors which saw Felly release a new song each Wednesday over that summer.

In August 2017, he released his first studio album, Wild Strawberries, as a Cinematic Music Group signee. The album featured the singles "Baby Boy", "Bag Season" (featuring Trip Carter), and "Wide Angle" (featuring Konshens). It also featured other guest appearances from Gyyps and Frex. In the fall of 2017, Felly opened for T-Pain for two nights on his "Acoustic Tour". Felly then embarked on his own 20-date "Strawberry Season Tour". In March 2018, he released an EP called, Winters in Brooklyn featuring the single, "BLANCO".

In September of that year, it was announced that Felly had been signed to Same Plate Entertainment, a joint venture with Sony Music. He released his first project on that label (Surf Trap) later that month. The lead single off the album was "Pretty Girl" followed by "Miami". In 2019, Felly continued releasing new music with tracks like "At Fault" (with Medasin) and "Cheap Cheap" (with Jack Harlow). He was also featured on the MAX song, "Acid Dreams", which was released in July 2019. In October of that year, Felly released the single, "Heartstrings", which featured Carlos Santana on guitar.

== Discography ==
=== Studio albums ===
List of studio albums, with year released and selected details
Title	Album details
Surf Trap	Released: September 28, 2018; Label: Same Plate/Sony Music Entertainment; Format: Digital download
Mariposa	Released: March 13, 2020; Label: Same Plate/Sony Music Entertainment; Format: Digital download
Young Fel 2	Released: October 21, 2021; Label: 300 Entertainment; Format: Digital download
Ambroxyde	Released: June 27, 2025; Label: everwonder; Format: Digital download, Vinyl

=== Mixtapes ===
List of mixtapes, with year released and selected details
Title	Album details
Waking up to Sirens	Released: May 5, 2014; Label: 2273 Records; Format: Digital download
Milk & Sugar	Released: November 6, 2014; Label: 2273 Records; Format: Digital download
This Shit Comes in Waves	Released: July 27, 2015; Label: 2273 Records; Format: Digital download
Wild Strawberries	Released: August 18, 2017; Label: Cinematic Music Group; Format: Digital download

=== EPs ===
List of EPs, with year released and selected details
Title	Album details
Young Fel	Released: July 22, 2016; Label: 2273 Records; Format: Digital download
Winters in Brooklyn	Released: March 14, 2018; Label: 2273 Records; Format: Digital download
Bad Radio	Released: December 9, 2022; Label: 2273 via Venice Music; Format: Digital download
I had a beautiful time, now I have to leave	Released: December 8, 2023; Label: 2273 via too Lost; Format: Digital download

=== Singles ===
List of singles with selected details
Title	Year	Album
"Fabrics"	2014	Waking up to Sirens
"Probation"	2014	Milk & Sugar
"Schoolzones"	2014	Milk & Sugar
"7th King"	2015	This Shit Comes in Waves
"Desert Eagle" (feat. Gyyps)	2016	Young Fel
"Baby Boy"	2017	Wild Strawberries
"Wide Angle" (feat. Konshens)	2017	Wild Strawberries
"Bag Season" (feat. Trip Carter)	2017	Wild Strawberries
"Pretty Girl"	2018	Surf Trap
"Miami"	2018	Surf Trap
"Maple"	2018	Surf Trap
"At Fault" (with Medasin)	2019	
"Cheap Cheap" (with Jack Harlow)	2019	
"Acid Dreams" (with MAX)	2019	Colour Vision
"Heartstrings" (feat. Santana)	2019	Mariposa
"Wood v2"	2020	
"Love And Fear"	2020	Mariposa
"Come Alive"	2020	Mariposa
"Something Restless"	2020	Mariposa
"The Most"	2020	
"Out My Head"	2020	
"450"	2020	
"So You Fell in Love"	2021	
"Slim Jawn"	2021	
"Everybody Loves You" (with Kota the Friend, Monte Booker)	2021	
"Fast Car"	2021	
"Still Young"	2021	Young Fel 2
"Pot Of Gold"	2021	Young Fel 2
"Bones"	2021	Young Fel 2
"intro"	2022	Bad Radio
"Bad Radio"	2022	Bad Radio
"Mirror"	2022	Bad Radio
"Listen!"	2022	Bad Radio
"Nothing Ordinary"	2022	Bad Radio
"no tears left to cry"	2022	Bad Radio
"Just Choose One (Interlude)"	2022	Bad Radio
"East Side (feat. Oliver Malcolm"	2022	Bad Radio
"me and my gang"	2022	Bad Radio
"Son of a Gun"	2022	Bad Radio
"in the meantime (outro)"	2022	Bad Radio
"Whatever Comes My Way"	2023	I had a beautiful time, now I have to leave
"Cherry"	2023	I had a beautiful time, now I have to leave
"There's no Other"	2023	I had a beautiful time, now I have to leave
"two lonely people and the sea"	2023	I had a beautiful time, now I have to leave
"I woke up and cried"	2023	I had a beautiful time, now I have to leave
"Beautiful Day"	2023	I had a beautiful time, now I have to leave
"There's no Other - Acoustic Version"	2023	I had a beautiful time, now I have to leave

=== as Producer ===
List of singles produced by Felly
Title	Year	Artist	Album
"Katie's Requiem" (feat. Raaginder & Vinnie Anastasia)	2013	Marcus Orelias	Rebel of the Underground
