= I Hate U, I Love U =

2016 single by Gnash featuring Olivia O'Brien

Single by Gnash featuring Olivia O'Brien

from the EP Us and the album We
- Released: February 17, 2016
- Genre: Pop
- Length: 4:11; 3:47 (radio edit)
- Label: Atlantic
- Songwriters: Garrett Nash; Olivia O'Brien
- Producer: Gnash

Gnash singles chronology
| "Come Back" (2016) | "I Hate U, I Love U" (2016) | "Something" (2016) |

Olivia O'Brien singles chronology
| "I Hate U, I Love U" (2016) | "Trust Issues" (2017) |

Music video
- "i hate u, i love u" on YouTube

"I Hate U, I Love U" (stylized in all lowercase) is a song by American singer and rapper Gnash featuring American singer Olivia O'Brien. It was released on July 26, 2015, as the first single from Gnash's third extended play, Us (2016). The song peaked at number ten on the Billboard Hot 100 in October 2016. Outside of the United States, "I Hate U, I Love U" topped the charts in Australia, a first for both Gnash and O'Brien, and peaked within the top ten of the charts in Austria, Belgium, Finland, Norway, and the United Kingdom.

On March 20, 2016, O'Brien released her solo version of the song titled "Hate U Love U".

The song was included on Gnash's debut studio album, We, which was released on January 11, 2019.

== Background and release ==
Gnash enlisted San Francisco singer-songwriter Olivia O'Brien with the help of JB, who originally wrote the song, to provide the vocals for the track. O'Brien had already worked with Gnash, having covered his song "Disposable". Gnash originally released the song on July 26, 2015, and it was later re-released on February 17, 2016, becoming the lead single of Gnash's extended play, Us (2016).

== Composition ==
The song is written in the key of F-sharp minor with a tempo of 92 beats per minute. Musically, "I Hate U, I Love U " is a Midtempo Pop song backed by a Piano, with elements of bedroom pop and Alt-pop. "I Hate U, I Love U" starts off with a simple melody played on the piano, as O'Brien starts to sing the first stanza and chorus, the latter of which introduces a sparse finger snapping beat that plays throughout the rest of the song. The second stanza is then sung by Gnash, as well as the third verse which is sing-rapped. The third chorus is sung by both artists. The first half of the bridge is sung by O'Brien and Gnash joins in for the second half. The song ends with a piano solo, as O'Brien sings the final chorus. It has a duration of four minutes and eleven seconds.

== Music video ==
The music video for "I Hate U, I Love U" premiered on March 7, 2016. The video was released on Gnash's official YouTube channel and has gained more than 724 million views as of April 2023.

== Cover versions ==
In September 2017, Muslim Nasheed artist Siedd released a cover version of 'I Hate U, I Love U' on YouTube. The song which has over 3 million views on YouTube features a capella arrangements with rewritten lyrics to reflect spiritual themes.

== Critical reception ==
Time was negative towards "I Hate U, I Love U", labeling it as one of the worst songs of 2016, writing "Forget The Chainsmokers and Halsey's chart-conquering smash 'Closer'—the most depressingly zeitgeist-defining song of 2016 is gnash's piano ballad 'i hate u, i love u,' with singer-songwriter Olivia O'Brien, which inexplicably rose to the Top 10 of the Hot 100 this year. The singsongy melody is obnoxious as an ice cream truck jingle, while the lifeless production drains it of any energy."

In 2017, the song was nominated for a Radio Disney Music Award for Best Breakup Song.

== Personnel ==
Credits for I Hate U, I Love U adapted from Allmusic.

- Gnash – lead vocals, songwriting, production
- Olivia O'Brien – lead vocals, songwriting
- Chris Gehringer – mastering
- Asa Welch – Piano, finger snapping

== Charts ==
=== Weekly charts ===
Weekly chart performance for "I Hate U, I Love U"
| Chart (2016) | Peak position |
|---|---|
| Australia (ARIA) | 1 |
| Austria (Ö3 Austria Top 40) | 9 |
| Belgium (Ultratop 50 Flanders) | 3 |
| Belgium (Ultratop 50 Wallonia) | 9 |
| Canada Hot 100 (Billboard) | 22 |
| Czech Republic Airplay (ČNS IFPI) | 9 |
| Czech Republic Singles Digital (ČNS IFPI) | 16 |
| Denmark (Tracklisten) | 29 |
| Finland (Suomen virallinen lista) | 2 |
| France (SNEP) | 18 |
| Germany (GfK) | 14 |
| Hungary (Rádiós Top 40) | 39 |
| Hungary (Single Top 40) | 21 |
| Hungary (Stream Top 40) | 26 |
| Ireland (IRMA) | 14 |
| Israel International Airplay (Media Forest) | 1 |
| Italy (FIMI) | 13 |
| Lebanon (Lebanese Top 20) | 5 |
| Netherlands (Dutch Top 40) | 21 |
| Netherlands (Single Top 100) | 23 |
| New Zealand (Recorded Music NZ) | 9 |
| Norway (VG-lista) | 23 |
| Portugal (AFP) | 8 |
| Slovakia Singles Digital (ČNS IFPI) | 26 |
| Slovenia (SloTop50) | 42 |
| Spain (Promusicae) | 32 |
| Sweden (Sverigetopplistan) | 15 |
| Switzerland (Schweizer Hitparade) | 15 |
| UK Singles (Official Charts) | 7 |
| US Billboard Hot 100 | 10 |
| US Adult Pop Airplay (Billboard) | 14 |
| US Pop Airplay (Billboard) | 5 |

=== Year-end charts ===
2016 year-end chart performance for "I Hate U, I Love U"
| Chart (2016) | Position |
|---|---|
| Australia (ARIA) | 13 |
| Austria (Ö3 Austria Top 40) | 39 |
| Belgium (Ultratop Flanders) | 21 |
| Belgium (Ultratop Wallonia) | 26 |
| Canada (Canadian Hot 100) | 50 |
| Denmark (Tracklisten) | 56 |
| France (SNEP) | 46 |
| Germany (Official German Charts) | 33 |
| Israel (Media Forest) | 19 |
| Italy (FIMI) | 44 |
| Netherlands (Dutch Top 40) | 73 |
| Netherlands (Single Top 100) | 42 |
| New Zealand (Recorded Music NZ) | 38 |
| Spain (PROMUSICAE) | 100 |
| Sweden (Sverigetopplistan) | 36 |
| Switzerland (Schweizer Hitparade) | 38 |
| UK Singles (Official Charts Company) | 32 |
| US Billboard Hot 100 | 38 |
| US Mainstream Top 40 (Billboard) | 42 |

2017 year-end chart performance for "I Hate U, I Love U"
| Chart (2017) | Position |
|---|---|
| Brazil (Pro-Música Brasil) | 200 |

== Certifications ==
Certifications and sales for "I Hate U, I Love U"
| Region | Certification | Certified units/sales |
|---|---|---|
| Australia (ARIA) | 2× Platinum | 140,000^{‡} |
| Austria (IFPI Austria) | Gold | 15,000^{‡} |
| Belgium (BRMA) | 2× Platinum | 40,000^{‡} |
| Canada (Music Canada) | 2× Platinum | 160,000^{‡} |
| Denmark (IFPI Danmark) | 2× Platinum | 180,000^{‡} |
| France (SNEP) | Diamond | 233,333^{‡} |
| Germany (BVMI) | 3× Gold | 600,000^{‡} |
| Italy (FIMI) | 3× Platinum | 150,000^{‡} |
| New Zealand (RMNZ) | 4× Platinum | 120,000^{‡} |
| Poland (ZPAV) | Platinum | 50,000^{‡} |
| Portugal (AFP) | Platinum | 10,000^{‡} |
| Spain (Promusicae) | Platinum | 40,000^{‡} |
| Switzerland (IFPI Switzerland) | Platinum | 30,000^{‡} |
| United Kingdom (BPI) | 2× Platinum | 1,200,000^{‡} |
| United States (RIAA) | 6× Platinum | 6,000,000^{‡} |
^{‡} Sales+streaming figures based on certification alone.

== Olivia O'Brien solo version ==
"Hate U Love U"

Single by Olivia O'Brien
- Released: December 9, 2016
- Recorded: 2015
- Genre: Indie pop
- Length: 2:55
- Label: Island
- Songwriter: Olivia O'Brien
- Producer: Gnash

Olivia O'Brien singles chronology
| "Find What You're Looking For" (2016) | "Hate U Love U" (2016) | "Empty" (2017) |

On December 9, 2016, O'Brien released her solo version of the song titled "Hate U Love U".

=== Charts ===
Chart performance for "Hate U Love U"
| Chart (2017) | Peak position |
|---|---|
| Canadian Digital Songs (Billboard) | 31 |
| US Billboard Hot 100 | 99 |

=== Certifications ===
Certifications for "Hate U Love U"
| Region | Certification | Certified units/sales |
|---|---|---|
| Brazil (Pro-Música Brasil) | Platinum | 60,000^{‡} |
| New Zealand (RMNZ) | Gold | 15,000^{‡} |
| Portugal (AFP) | Gold | 5,000^{‡} |
| United Kingdom (BPI) | Silver | 200,000^{‡} |
| United States (RIAA) | Gold | 500,000^{‡} |
^{‡} Sales+streaming figures based on certification alone.
