= Love Me Less =

2019 single by MAX featuring Quinn XCII

Single by MAX featuring Quinn XCII

from the album Colour Vision
- Released: April 5, 2019
- Genre: Pop
- Length: 2:57
- Label: Colour Vision; RED Music
- Composers: Imad-Roy El-Amine; Max Schneider; Mikael Temrowski; Nolan Sipe; Rogét Chahayed
- Producers: Imad Royal; Rogét Chahayed

MAX singles chronology
"Worship" (2018)	"Love Me Less" (2019)	"Acid Dreams" (2019)

Quinn XCII singles chronology
"Life Must Go On" (2019)	"Love Me Less" (2019)	"Stacy" (2019)

Music video
- "Love Me Less" on YouTube

"Love Me Less" is a song by American singer-songwriter MAX featuring American singer Quinn XCII from the former's third studio album, Colour Vision. It was released by Colour Vision Records and RED Music on April 5, 2019, as the lead single from the album and MAX's first single of 2019. A new version of the single dropped in September featuring German singer Kim Petras.

== Promotion ==
On March 20, 2019, MAX revealed the song, cover art, guest feature, and release date.

== Credits and personnel ==
Adapted from Tidal.

- MAX – composer, associated performer,
- Quinn XCII – associated performer
- Imad Royal and Rogét – producer, recording engineer
- Rogét Chahayed – producer, composer, piano, recording engineer
- Imad-Roy El-Amine – composer, guitar
- Temrowski – composer
- Nolan Sipe – composer
- Aaron Mattes – assistant engineer
- David Kutch – mastering engineer
- Erik Madrid – mixing engineer

== Charts ==
Chart performance for "Love Me Less"
Chart (2019)	Peak position
Lithuania (AGATA)	93
US Adult Pop Airplay (Billboard)	37
US Bubbling Under Hot 100 (Billboard)	1
US Dance Airplay (Billboard)	34
US Pop Airplay (Billboard)	19

== Certifications ==
Region	Certification	Certified units/sales
Canada (Music Canada)	Platinum	80,000^{‡}
United States (RIAA)	Platinum	1,000,000^{‡}
^{‡} Sales+streaming figures based on certification alone.

== Kim Petras remix ==
"Love Me Less"

Remix by MAX featuring Kim Petras
- Released: September 5, 2019
- Length: 2:57
- Label: Colour Vision; RED Music
- Composers: Imad-Roy El-Amine; Max Schneider; Mikael Temrowski; Nolan Sipe; Rogét Chahayed
- Producers: Imad Royal and Rogét; Chahayed

Kim Petras chronology
"Icy" (2019)	"Love Me Less" (2019)	"How It's Done" (2019)

A remix of the song featuring German singer Kim Petras was released on September 5, 2019.

== Release history ==
Country	Date	Format	Label	Ref.
Various	July 10, 2019	Digital download; streaming	Colour Vision; RED Music	
