= Lights Down Low (Max song) =

- EP cover

Single by Max featuring Gnash

from the album Hell's Kitchen Angel
- Released: October 14, 2016
- Genre: Pop
- Length: 3:44
- Label: DCD2
- Songwriter(s): Max Schneider; Nathaniel Motte; Liam O'Donnell
- Producer(s): Nathaniel Motte

Max singles chronology
"Basement Party" (2016)	"Lights Down Low" (2016)	"Did You Wrong" (2016)

Gnash singles chronology
"Home" (2016)	"Lights Down Low" (2016)	"Lonely Again" (2017)

"Lights Down Low" is a song by American singer Max Schneider (better known as MAX) from his 2016 album, Hell's Kitchen Angel. The song was written by Schneider, Nathaniel Motte, and Liam O'Donnell, with Motte serving as the producer. A later remix of the song includes a feature and writing contribution from singer Gnash. The song, which Max used to propose to his wife Emily, was released in October 2016; it became a sleeper hit, entering the Billboard Hot 100 more than a year after its release, and also earning a Platinum certification from the RIAA for sales of more than 1,000,000 copies. The song had an accompanying music video tracing the life of a couple living in an apartment. A "Latin Mix" featuring Argentine singer Tini was released on December 15, 2017.

== Background ==
After recording the song, Max played it for his girlfriend, Emily, followed by a marriage proposal which she accepted. Originally, Max planned to release the song in its solo form, but he decided to feature American rapper Gnash on it after "this moment where I was like, 'Well, I kind of hear [Gnash's] voice on "Lights Down Low." I never considered a rapper, it's a ballad, but you know what? I'm just gonna talk to him.'"

After the song's release, it drew much attention in the LGBT community. In a 2017 interview with Billboard, Max stated that "It's not our song anymore. It's everybody's song. Everybody is able to add whatever they want to it, what it is to them, and in that way, it becomes so much less — it's not about us anymore. It's not about even the artist or the writer or the singer, it's about what it can stand for for people."

== Composition ==
"Lights Down Low" is a midtempo pop song, with a length of 3 minutes and 44 seconds. Its instrumentation consists of keyboards, drums, guitar, and handclaps with Guitar pop and Acoustic pop elements and features a "Soulful" voice. Sheet music for the song shows the key of E♭ major.

== Music video ==
The music video stars Max and his wife, Emily. The music video was shot above a bed; it depicts Max in various relationships over the course of his lifetime. The video was directed by Crush Music and Christian Snell. Jade Ehlers, who is the creative director at Crush Music, explained that "the music video depicts what one's life might look like if they lived in one apartment their whole life."

== Commercial performance ==
The song was a sleeper hit, becoming MAX's first Billboard Hot 100 entry as a lead artist. It peaked at number 20 on the chart dated March 3, 2018. The song reached number one on the Billboard Adult Top 40 and number seven on the Mainstream Top 40. The radio promotion for the song was led by Brent Battles and Christopher Steven Brown of RED MUSIC. It also reached number 11 on the Canada Hot Adult Contemporary chart. Its unexpected success was credited to strong airplay by hot adult contemporary stations in the United States.

In Belgium, the song peaked at number five on Ultratip's Bubbling Under Singles chart, spending a total of eight weeks on the chart.

In September 2017, the song was certified Gold in the United States for sales of more than 500,000 copies. In January 2018, the certification was upgraded to Platinum for sales of more than 1,000,000 copies.

== Charts ==
=== Weekly charts ===
Chart (2017–2018)	Peak position
Belgium (Ultratip Bubbling Under Flanders)	5
Canada (Canadian Hot 100)	51
Canada Hot AC (Billboard)	2
Czech Republic (Singles Digitál Top 100)	97
Portugal (AFP)	95
Slovakia (Singles Digitál Top 100)	96
US Billboard Hot 100	20
US Radio Songs (Billboard)	5
US Adult Contemporary (Billboard)	2
US Adult Pop Airplay (Billboard)	1
US Dance/Mix Show Airplay (Billboard)	10
US Pop Airplay (Billboard)	7

=== Year-end charts ===
Chart (2018)	Position
US Billboard Hot 100	66
US Radio Songs (Billboard)	24
US Adult Contemporary (Billboard)	2
US Adult Top 40 (Billboard)	9
US Dance/Mix Show Airplay (Billboard)	48
US Mainstream Top 40 (Billboard)	24

Chart (2019)	Position
US Adult Contemporary (Billboard)	23

== Certifications ==
Region	Certification	Certified units/sales
Australia (ARIA)	Gold	35,000^{‡}
Canada (Music Canada)	3× Platinum	240,000^{‡}
Denmark (IFPI Danmark)	Gold	45,000^{‡}
Netherlands (NVPI)	Gold	20,000^{‡}
New Zealand (RMNZ)	Platinum	30,000^{‡}
United Kingdom (BPI)	Silver	200,000^{‡}
United States (RIAA)	3× Platinum	3,000,000^{‡}
^{‡} Sales+streaming figures based on certification alone.
