= Yung Bae =

American musician

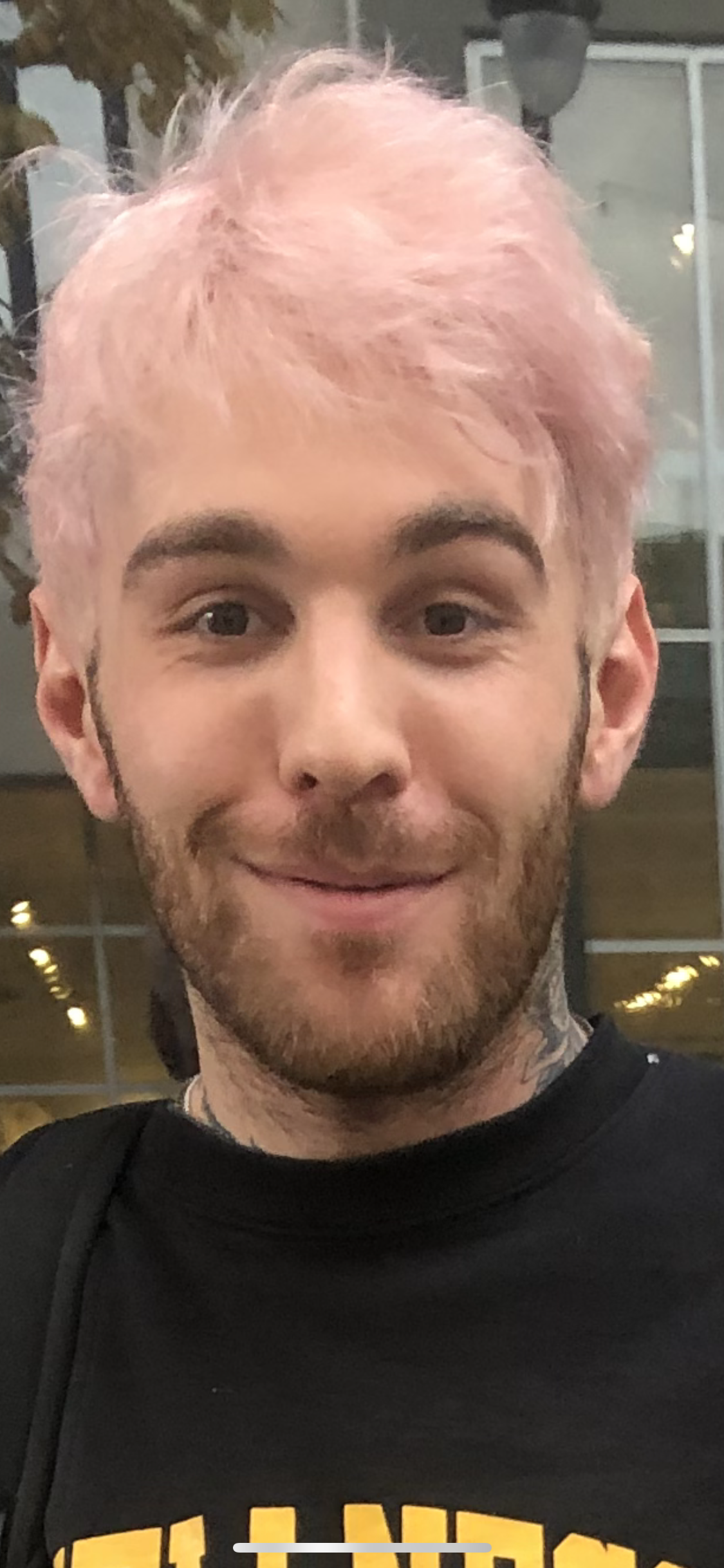
- Yung Bae in 2022
- Born: Dallas Michael Cotton; July 2, 1994 (age 32)
- Musical career
- Origin: Portland, Oregon
- Genre: Future funk
- Occupations: Musician, producer
- Years active: 2014–present
- Website: www.yungbae.com

Dallas Michael Cotton (born July 2, 1994) also known as Yung Bae, is an American future funk DJ and producer from Portland, Oregon, known for his Bae series of albums which sampled American disco, funk, and 1980s Japanese city pop.

== Early life ==
Born in 1994 as Dallas Cotton, Yung Bae began as a music producer based out of Portland, Oregon. He attended Oregon State University for four months before turning to music full time. His first full album was titled Bae. He has since moved and begun working out of Los Angeles.

== Music career ==
Yung Bae works in the future funk and vaporwave subgenres, releasing tracks online through sites like Bandcamp—he released eight in total on that site. These received several million streams on Spotify. His early release albums included three volumes of his album series Japanese Disco Edits. In 2016 his releases included Skyscraper Anonymous, BAE 2, BA3, and Bae: Side B. In 2017 he released B4E. He has collaborated with acts such as Flamingosis, Brasstracks, Method Man, BBno$, Mike Posner, Sam Fischer, Channel Tres, Marc E. Bassy, Jon Batiste, Earthgang, Awolnation, Pink Sweats, and Nile Rodgers, amongst others. In 2019 he released the single "Must Be Love" and "Bad Boy" which were included in his album Bae 5. "Bad Boy" was also his first single release after signing to major label Arista Records.

In 2019 Yung Bae was named to the Billboard Dance Ones to Watch list. In 2019 he went on a 21-date North American tour in support of his album Bae 5. He has also toured internationally through Asia at locations such as the National Gallery of Singapore, and performed international music festivals such as Coachella.

== Discography ==
Year	Album
2014	Bae
2016	BAE 2
2016	BA3
2016	Skyscraper Anonymous
2016	Bae: Side B
2017	B4E
2019	Bae 5
2022	Groove Continental: Side A
2023	Groove Continental: Side B
2024	6AE
