= Was It Even Real? =

2019 studio album by Olivia O'Brien

Studio album by Olivia O'Brien
- Released: April 26, 2019
- Genre: Pop
- Length: 32:39
- Label: Island

Olivia O'Brien chronology
| It's Not That Deep (2017) | Was It Even Real? (2019) | It Was A Sad Fucking Summer (2019) |

Singles from Was It Even Real?
- 1. "I Don't Exist" Released: September 14, 2018; 2. "Care Less More" Released: November 9, 2018; 3. "Love Myself" Released: February 1, 2019; 4. "Just a Boy" Released: April 19, 2019

Was It Even Real? is the debut studio album by American singer-songwriter Olivia O'Brien, released on April 26, 2019, through Island Records. The album was preceded by four singles; "I Don't Exist", "Care Less More", "Love Myself" and "Just a Boy" as well as two promotional singles; "UDK" and "Just Friends"

== Singles ==
On August 3, 2018, "UDK" was released as the first promotional single from the album. In an interview with Harper's Bazaar, O'Brien said the song is to "tell those people that they only see what I want them to see and assumptions will get them nowhere. I think we can all agree that judging people before you’ve even met them or given them a real chance is wrong."

On September 14, 2018, "I Don't Exist" was released as the first single from the album. Nicole Engelman of Billboard said "with deep, soulful vocals, O'Brien sings of being disillusioned with Hollywood’s perfect facade and wonders. "I Don’t Exist" is a poignant depiction of what it feels like to be an outcast in a world that’s too busy to care." A music video accompanied the release, with O'Brien saying "I tried to capture the feeling I had when writing the song... feeling like no one acknowledges your existence, or cares that you are there, even when you are surrounded by people."

"Care Less More" was released as the second single from Was It Even Real? on November 9, 2018. This was followed by "Love Myself" on February 1, 2019 and "Just a Boy" on April 19, 2019.

== Reception ==
Emma Turney of WRBB began her review of the album by stating that the "imagery on Was It Even Real? is perfectly executed and delightfully detailed", noting the album cover. Turney stated that despite O'Brien's "underwhelming voice, the album succeeds with its bop-worthy production and poetic lyrics". Turney stated that "Care Less More" was "painfully unlistenable, seeming like her producer called out sick the day of recording and left O'Brien to use GarageBand to finish the song." She proceeded to state that O'Brien has the "becoming the next teen idol", and finished the review by saying that she was "continually surprised at the diversity of sound O’Brien is capable of".

Alyssa Yung of Ones to Watch wrote that on every song on the album, "the sun shines through", and that O'Brien's "unique blend of shimmering pop, with hints of soulful R&B, demonstrate the advanced maturity of the 19-year old". Yung described "I Don't Exist" as "hard-hitting", and noted the irony between the messages of "Just Friends" and "We Lied To Each Other". Speaking of the album as a whole, she described it as "superb", describing it as a "thrilling emotional rollercoaster".

== Track listing ==
| No. | Title | Writer(s) | Producer(s) | Length |
|---|---|---|---|---|
| 1. | "Purpleworld" | Olivia O'Brien; Anton Hård af Segerstad; Drew MacDonald; Tobias Frelin | Anton Hård | 3:08 |
| 2. | "I Don't Exist" | O'Brien; Segerstad; MacDonald; Frelin | Anton Hård | 3:23 |
| 3. | "Inhibition (omw)" | O'Brien; Segerstad; MacDonald; Frelin | Anton Hård | 3:25 |
| 4. | "Just Friends" | O'Brien; Segerstad; Frelin | Anton Hård | 2:13 |
| 5. | "We Lied To Each Other" | O'Brien; Teddy Geiger | Teddy Geiger | 3:35 |
| 6. | "UDK" | O'Brien; Segerstad; Frelin | Anton Hård | 3:08 |
| 7. | "Care Less More" | O'Brien; Segerstad; MacDonald; Frelin | Anton Hård | 2:56 |
| 8. | "Just a Boy" | O'Brien; Segerstad; Frelin; Warren Felder | Oak; Downtown Trevor Brown; Keith Sorrells; Anton Hård | 3:38 |
| 9. | "Call Me!!!" | O'Brien; Matt Parad; Geiger | Geiger; Matt Parad | 3:35 |
| 10. | "Love Myself" | O'Brien; Segerstad; Jesse Shatkin; Frelin | Anton Hård; Jesse Shatkin | 3:33 |
| Total length: | | | | 32:39 |

Notes:

"Purpleworld" is stylized in all lowercase.
