= Gibberish (song) =

Single by MAX featuring Hoodie Allen

from the EP Ms. Anonymous and the album Hell's Kitchen Angel
- Released: March 23, 2015
- Recorded: 2014–15
- Length: 3:30
- Label: DCD2; Crush
- Songwriters: Jonas Jeberg; Hoodie Allen; Morgan Taylor Reid; Sean Douglas

MAX singles chronology
"Puppeteer" (2015)	"Gibberish" (2015)	"Ms. Anonymous" (2015)

Hoodie Allen singles chronology
"Let It All Work Out" (2015)	"Gibberish" (2015)	"The Moment" (2015)

Music video
- "Gibberish" on YouTube

"Gibberish" is a song by American singer MAX. The song was released as a single on March 23, 2015. It features the vocals of Hoodie Allen. The music video was released the same day and as of July 2026 has over 28 million views on YouTube. The song was featured on the dance game, Just Dance 2016.

Upon release, the song was MAX's most successful single to date, peaking at number one on the Twitter Trending 140. The song was put on MAX's EP, Ms. Anonymous, and was included on his studio album, Hell's Kitchen Angel.

In June 2016, when MAX was picked as Elvis Duran's Artist of the Month, he was featured on NBC's Today show hosted by Kathie Lee Gifford and Hoda Kotb and broadcast nationally where he performed "Gibberish" live on the show. The song was nominated for an 'Ardy' at the Radio Disney Music Awards (2016) for Best Song to Lip Sync To.

== Charts ==
Chart (2015)	Peak position
Czech Republic Singles Digital (ČNS IFPI)	79
Slovakia Singles Digital (ČNS IFPI)	77

== Awards and nominations ==
Radio Disney Music Awards
Year	Category	Result
2016	Best Song to Lip Sync To	Nominated

== Release history ==
Region	Date	Format	Label
United States	March 23, 2015	Digital download	DCD2; Crush
