= Max Schneider =

American singer (born 1992)

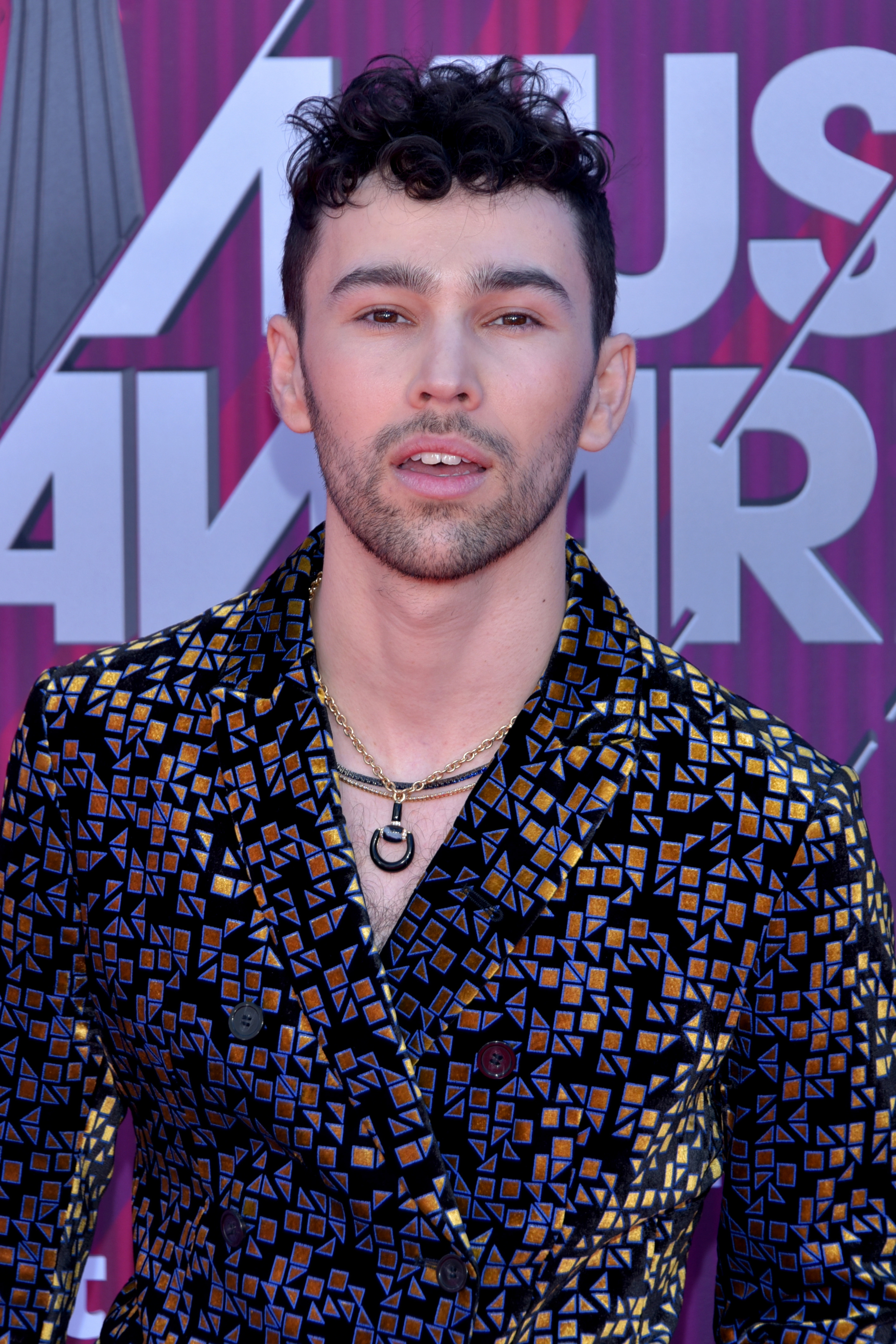
- Schneider at the 2019 iHeartRadio Music Awards
- Born: Maxwell George Schneider; June 21, 1992 (age 34); Manhattan, New York City, U.S.
- Other name: MAX
- Occupations: Singer; actor; dancer; model
- Years active: 2008–present
- Works: Discography; filmography
- Spouse: Emily Cannon (m. 2016)
- Children: 1
- Musical career
- Labels: Colour Vision; Warner; Arista; Sony RED; DCD2
- Formerly of: Party Pupils
- Website: maxmusicofficial.com

Maxwell George Schneider (born June 21, 1992), also known by his mononym Max (stylized in all caps), is an American singer and actor. He is best known for his 2016 single "Lights Down Low" (featuring Gnash), which peaked within the top 20 of the Billboard Hot 100 and received triple platinum certification by the Recording Industry Association of America (RIAA). A sleeper hit, the song emerged from his second album, Hell's Kitchen Angel (2016), which was released by DCD2 Records and narrowly entered the Billboard 200. He signed with Arista Records to release his third album, Color Vision (2020).

Schneider was nominated for Best New Pop Artist at the 2019 iHeartRadio Music Awards, and, in 2020, his single "Love Me Less" received gold certification by the RIAA and Music Canada (MC).

== Career ==
Schneider was raised in Woodstock, New York. He began performing at age three and acquired his first agent at the age of 14. Schneider was a swing understudy in the Broadway musical 13 covering 4 roles in 2008 and 2009, and modeled with Madonna for an international Dolce & Gabbana campaign. He was the 2010 YoungArts Theater Winner, and released his debut extended play First Encounters that year.

In 2012, Schneider co-wrote the song "Show You How to Do" with Ben Charles for the Disney series Shake It Up (2010). He portrayed Zander in the Nickelodeon TV series How to Rock and also co-wrote a song for the show, "Last 1 Standing" with Matt Wong and Claire Demorest, which he sold to the show—the song featured in two episodes of the series. Schneider also starred in the Nickelodeon original film Rags, in the lead role as Charlie Prince. Later that year, he toured with Victoria Justice on her Make It In America Tour, and co-wrote the song "Standing in China" for Cody Simpson's debut studio album Paradise.

Schneider featured on two tracks from Hoodie Allen's debut album People Keep Talking in October 2014. In February 2015, he released an album titled NWL. Originally planned to be an EP titled The Nothing Without Love EP, the album was funded by donations through Kickstarter. Its first single, "Nothing Without Love", was originally released together with an accompanying music video on May 21, 2013. The singer's 2014 single "Mug Shot", also included on the album, was his first to be released under the stage name Max. Schneider has since gone by Max musically because he "[wants the name] to be more of a vehicle for the music".

On February 19, 2015, it was announced that Max had signed with DCD2 Records and would be releasing new music under the label. Throughout June, he toured with Fall Out Boy, Wiz Khalifa, and Allen on the Boys of Zummer Tour. The album Hell's Kitchen Angel, his first under DCD2, followed in April 2016. It featured the singles "Lights Down Low" and a "Young Pop-God" by GQ—the former later earned double platinum certifications in the United States and Canada. Max became the lead singer of a new soul group called Witchita, formed with Tim Armstrong, that same month. The group's first single, "Mrs Magoo", was released via Hellcat Records on April 21. In June, he was picked as Elvis Duran's Artist of the Month and appeared on NBC's Today show, hosted by Kathie Lee Gifford and Hoda Kotb, where he performed the single "Gibberish".

Max released the collaboration single "Team" with Noah Cyrus in 2018. During the summer of 2019, Max's new single "Love Me Less", featuring Quinn XCII, reached the top 20 at Top 40 Radio. Max was named an iHeart 2019 Best New Pop Artist nominee, and labeled by Billboard as a number one Emerging Artist. Since then, Love Me Less has been certified Gold in the US and Canada. Max performed the single on Jimmy Kimmel Live!, the Today Show, and Live with Kelly and Ryan. In 2020, he released "Missed Calls" with Hayley Kiyoko, and featured on the mixtape D-2 by Korean artist Agust D, the solo moniker of Suga of the South Korean boy band BTS. Suga was later featured in Max's song "Blueberry Eyes". His third studio album, Colour Vision, was released on September 18, 2020.

On 16 February 2024, Max released his fourth studio album titled Love in Stereo. In October 2024, the song "I'll Be There" was released by South Korean singer Jin, which Max co-wrote and co-produced.

== Personal life ==
Schneider grew up in Woodstock, New York. He was raised Jewish. His father is from a Jewish family and his mother converted to Judaism. In 2018, the artist underwent surgery that required a vocal rest for four months. Max married Emily Cannon at a courthouse on April 1, 2016, and welcomed their child, a daughter named Edie Celine, in December 2020.

In an interview in 2020, Max Schneider explains why he collaborated with so many artists. Since he is an only child, he explains that when he meets other musicians, he feels like the best way to connect is through music. In the interview, Schneider says, "There's a spark of magic in every collaboration, and you find you made a song that you never would have done if you were alone in your room."

== Discography ==
- NWL (2015)
- Hell's Kitchen Angel (2016)
- Colour Vision (2020)
- Love In Stereo (2024)

== Filmography ==
Film
Year	Film	Role	Notes
2013	The Last Keepers	Lance	
2015	Love and Mercy	Van Dyke Parks	
Television
2009	Law & Order: Special Victims Unit	Justin McTeague	"Lead" (season 10: episode 15)
2010	One Life to Live	Main Dancer	2 episodes
2011	Worldwide Day of Play	Himself	TV special
2011	TeenNick HALO Awards	Himself	Award show
2012	How to Rock	Zander Robbins	Main cast (25 episodes)
2012	Rags	Charlie Prince	TV movie; Lead role
2012	Figure It Out	Himself	Game show; Panelist (7 episodes)
2012	Beauty & the Beast	Jake Riley (Teen Pop Star)	"Trapped" (season 1: episode 8)
2014	Crisis	Ian	Main cast
2018	Ridiculousness	Himself	Guest (season 11 : episode 5)

== Awards and nominations ==
Year	Award Ceremony	Category	Nominee/work	Result	Ref
2015	Streamy Awards	Breakout Artist	Himself	Nominated	
2015	Streamy Awards	Original Song	"Gibberish"	Nominated	
2016	Radio Disney Music Awards	Best Song To Lip Sync To	"Gibberish"	Nominated	
2018	iHeartRadio Titanium Awards	1 Billion Total Audience Spins on iHeartRadio Stations	"Lights Down Low" ft Gnash	Won	
2019	iHeartRadio Music Awards	Best New Pop Artist	Himself	Nominated	
2020	Asia Artist Awards	Best Pop Artist	Himself	Won	
