= Gnash (musician) =

American musician and producer

Garrett Nash
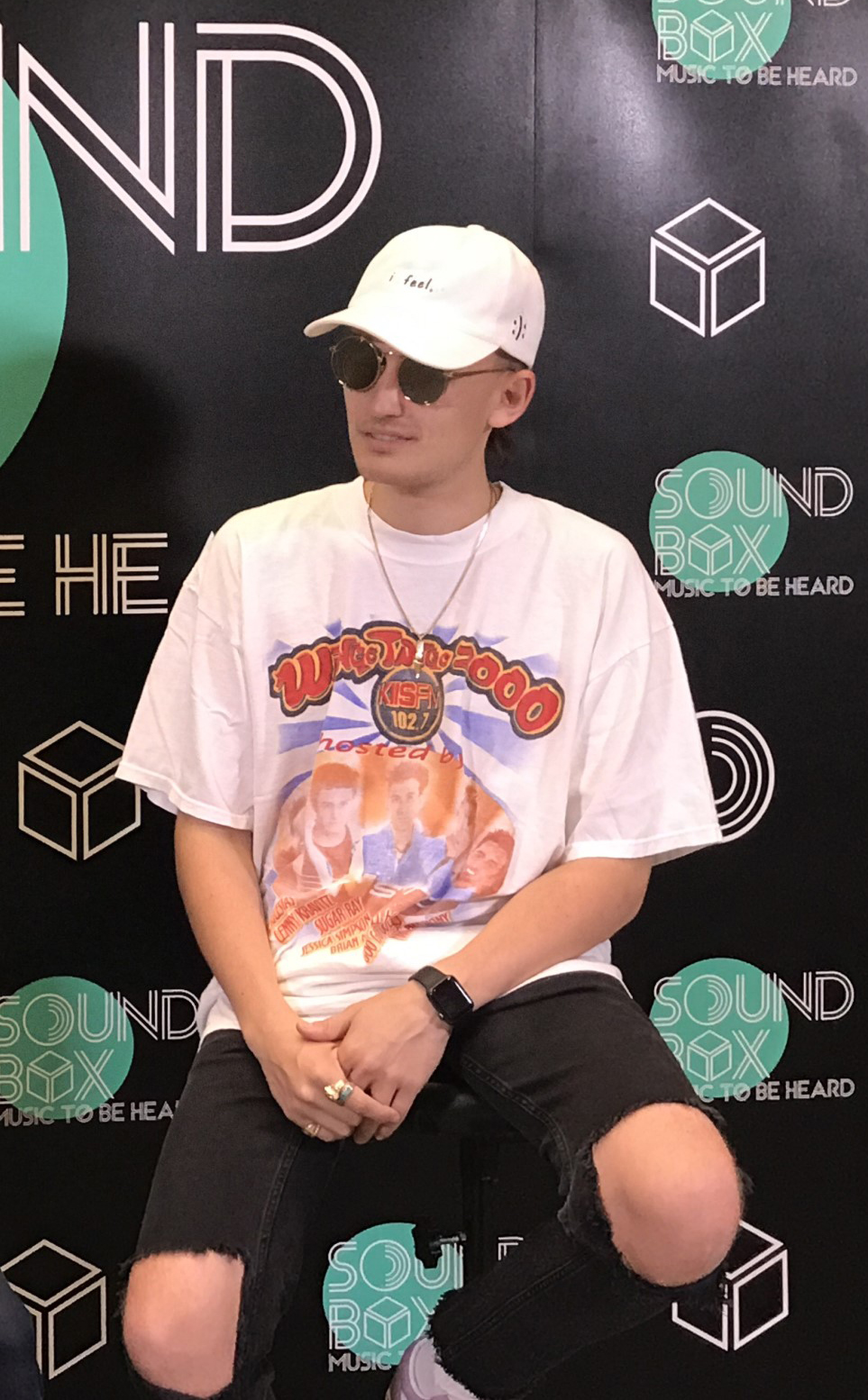
- Gnash in 2017

Background information
- Born: Garrett Charles Nash; June 16, 1993 (age 33); Los Angeles, California, U.S.
- Genres: Pop; alternative hip-hop; alternative R&B; indie folk
- Occupations: Singer; rapper; disc jockey; record producer; songwriter
- Years active: 2015–present
- Label: Atlantic
- Website: gnash.us

Garrett Charles Nash (born June 16, 1993), known by his stage name Gnash (stylized as gnash; pronounced "nash"), is an American singer, rapper, DJ, and record producer. He released his debut extended play (EP), U, in March 2015, and followed by his second EP, Me, in December of that year. His third EP, titled Us, was released in March 2017 and spawned the single "I Hate U, I Love U" (featuring Olivia O'Brien), which peaked at number 10 on the Billboard Hot 100 and reached number one in Australia. His debut studio album We was released in January 2019, and also features "I Hate U, I Love U".

== Early life ==
Garrett Charles Nash was born June 16, 1993, in Los Angeles, California. His father is a musician, and his mother is a director and producer. Nash is of English, Norwegian, German, Scottish, Irish, Swedish, and Lenape descent.

Before writing his own music, Nash started DJing when he was 13 years old until he began producing cover songs after college.

== Career ==
In 2015, Gnash began to release a series of EPs about a previous breakup, starting with U on March 15, 2015 and Me on December 15, 2015. Gnash recorded his first two EPs in his garage and produced the song "I Hate U, I Love U" in his garage as well, which eventually became his breakthrough song, peaking at number ten on the Billboard Hot 100. Nash's third EP, Us, was released on March 25, 2016, and peaked at number 46 on the Billboard 200.

In October 2016, Gnash was featured on Max's "Lights Down Low" which peaked at number twenty on the Billboard Hot 100, becoming his second entry on the chart, with "Home", released two weeks later, becoming his second lead entry.

In January 2019, Gnash released his debut album We.

Gnash has cited Death Cab for Cutie, The Postal Service, Kanye West, and Jack Johnson as his musical influences.

== Awards and nominations ==
In 2017, Gnash was nominated for his song, "I Hate U, I Love U" (featuring Olivia O'Brien) as the Best Breakup Song at the 2017 Radio Disney Music Awards.

== Discography ==
=== Studio albums ===
Title	Album details	Certifications
We	Released: January 11, 2019; Format: LP, digital download; Label: Atlantic	RIAA: Gold
The Art of Letting Go	Released: March 24, 2023; Format: Digital download, streaming; Label: Atlantic, Overall	

=== EPs ===
Title	Details	Peak chart positions		
Title	Details	US	AUS	DEN
U	Released: March 15, 2015; Format: Digital download	—	—	—
Me	Released: December 15, 2015; Format: Digital download	—	—	—
Us	Released: March 25, 2016; Format: Digital download	46	93	32
If	Released: December 21, 2019; Format: Digital download	—	—	—
Outside/Inside	Released: June 16, 2020; Format: Digital download	—	—	—
One	Released: October 7, 2022; Format: Digital download	—	—	—
Two	Released: November 11, 2022; Format: Digital download	—	—	—
Three	Released: December 9, 2022; Format: Digital download	—	—	—
Four	Released: January 20, 2023; Format: Digital download	—	—	—
Five	Released: February 17, 2023; Format: Digital download	—	—	—
"—" denotes a recording that did not chart or was not released in that territory.

=== Singles ===
==== As lead artist ====
Title	Year	Peak chart positions										Certifications	Album
Title	Year	US	AUS	AUT	BEL (FL)	CAN	DEN	ITA	NZ	SWE	UK	Certifications	Album
"Daydreams" (featuring Julius)	2015	—	—	—	—	—	—	—	—	—	—		Me
"Fuck Me Up"	2015	—	—	—	—	—	—	—	—	—	—		Me
"That One Song" (featuring Goody Grace)	2015	—	—	—	—	—	—	—	—	—	—		Me
"Feelings Fade" (featuring Rkcb)	2015	—	—	—	—	—	—	—	—	—	—		Me
"ILUSM"	2015	—	—	—	—	—	—	—	—	—	—		Me
"I Hate U, I Love U" (featuring Olivia O'Brien)	2016	10	1	9	3	22	29	13	9	15	7	RIAA: 6× Platinum; ARIA: 2× Platinum; BEA: Platinum; BPI: 2× Platinum; FIMI: 2× Platinum; IFPI DEN: Platinum; MC: 2× Platinum; RMNZ: Platinum	Us and We
"Something"	2016	—	—	—	—	—	—	—	—	—	—		Non-album singles
"Home" (featuring Johnny Yukon)	2016	76	—	—	—	—	—	—	—	—	—		Non-album singles
"Lonely Again"	2017	—	—	—	—	—	—	—	—	—	—		If
"I Could Change Your Life"	2017	—	—	—	—	—	—	—	—	—	—		Non-album single
"Stargazing" (featuring Vancouver Sleep Clinic)	2017	—	—	—	—	—	—	—	—	—	—		If
"Belong" (featuring DENM)	2017	—	—	—	—	—	—	—	—	—	—		If
"Superlit" (with Imad Royal)	2017	—	—	—	—	—	—	—	—	—	—		If
"The Broken Hearts Club"	2018	—	—	—	—	—	—	—	—	—	—		We
"Imagine If" (solo or featuring Ruth B.) (Note: The solo version of "Imagine If" appears on the We album; the version with Ruth B. was released separately.)	2018	—	—	—	—	—	—	—	—	—	—		We
"Dear Insecurity" (featuring Ben Abraham)	2018	—	—	—	—	—	—	—	—	—	—		We
"Nobody's Home"	2018	—	—	—	—	—	—	—	—	—	—		We
"T-Shirt"	2018	—	—	—	—	—	—	—	—	—	—		We
"Sunset"	2019	—	—	—	—	—	—	—	—	—	—		If
"I'm So Sad"	2019	—	—	—	—	—	—	—	—	—	—		If
"Let Me Go" (with Adam&Steve)	2019	—	—	—	—	—	—	—	—	—	—		Non-album singles
"Sick" (with Cxloe)	2019	—	—	—	—	—	—	—	—	—	—		Non-album singles
"Forgive"	2019	—	—	—	—	—	—	—	—	—	—		Non-album singles
"Hungover & I Miss U"	2020	—	—	—	—	—	—	—	—	—	—		Non-album singles
"Fear"	2020	—	—	—	—	—	—	—	—	—	—		Non-album singles
"Wash Your Hands" (with Sad Alex and Roken)	2020	—	—	—	—	—	—	—	—	—	—		Non-album singles
"Leave"	2020	—	—	—	—	—	—	—	—	—	—		Non-album singles
"Heartbreak Anthem" (with Kyd the Band)	2020	—	—	—	—	—	—	—	—	—	—		Non-album singles
"Text Talk Touch" (with Alt Bloom)	2020	—	—	—	—	—	—	—	—	—	—		Non-album singles
"Cry Baby" (with Gia Koka)	2020	—	—	—	—	—	—	—	—	—	—		Non-album singles
"Me Time" (with Bodie)	2020	—	—	—	—	—	—	—	—	—	—		Non-album singles
"I'm Glad That You Found Someone" (with Sad Alex)	2020	—	—	—	—	—	—	—	—	—	—		Non-album singles
"Numb & Nervous" (with Alec King)	2020	—	—	—	—	—	—	—	—	—	—		Everything's Backwards
"Palm Trees"	2021	—	—	—	—	—	—	—	—	—	—		One and The Art of Letting Go
"Super Glue" (with Slimdan)	2021	—	—	—	—	—	—	—	—	—	—		Non-album singles
"Stacy's Mom"	2021	—	—	—	—	—	—	—	—	—	—		Non-album singles
"The Middle of Nowhere"	2022	—	—	—	—	—	—	—	—	—	—		Non-album singles
"Breathe In" (with Shwayze)	2022	—	—	—	—	—	—	—	—	—	—		Shway SZN
"Where the Sidewalk Ends" (with Scott Helman)	2022	—	—	—	—	—	—	—	—	—	—		Non-album single
"Money, Love & Death"	2022	—	—	—	—	—	—	—	—	—	—		Two and The Art of Letting Go
"Granola Bars" (with Annika Wells)	2022	—	—	—	—	—	—	—	—	—	—		Non-album singles
"Breakfast in Bed" (with Stephanie Poetri)	2022	—	—	—	—	—	—	—	—	—	—		Non-album singles
"I Wanna Feel Good" (with Chris James)	2022	—	—	—	—	—	—	—	—	—	—		Why Should We Turn Around?
"Glass on the Shelf" (with Mark Diamond)	2023	—	—	—	—	—	—	—	—	—	—		Non-album singles
"Wet Cement"	2023	—	—	—	—	—	—	—	—	—	—		Non-album singles
"Romance Is Dead" (with Caleb Dee)	2023	—	—	—	—	—	—	—	—	—	—		Something in Between
"Someone" (with Bayuk)	2023	—	—	—	—	—	—	—	—	—	—		Non-album singles
"Do U Love Me?" (with Aimee Vant)	2024	—	—	—	—	—	—	—	—	—	—		Non-album singles
"Mario Kart" (with Clide)	2024	—	—	—	—	—	—	—	—	—	—		Non-album singles
"—" denotes a recording that did not chart or was not released in that territory.

===== Notes =====
- "Forgive" was co-written by Luke Hemmings of 5 Seconds of Summer and Sierra Deaton.

==== As featured artist ====
Title	Year	Peak chart positions				Certifications	Album
Title	Year	US	US Pop	BEL (FL) Tip	CAN	Certifications	Album
"Come Back" (Kidswaste featuring Gnash)	2016	—	—	—	—		Non-album singles
"Two Shots" (Goody Grace featuring Gnash)	2016	—	—	—	—		Non-album singles
"Lights Down Low" (Max featuring Gnash)	2016	20	7	5	51	RIAA: 3× Platinum; MC: Platinum	Lights Down Low EP
"Beautiful Problem" (Mod Sun featuring Gnash)	2017	—	—	—	—		Non-album singles
"Bad 4 U" (Imad Royal featuring Gnash)	2017	—	—	—	—		Non-album singles
"Mutual Soul" (Triangle Park featuring Gnash)	2017	—	—	—	—		Non-album singles
"Kiss Fight" (Tülpa & Banks featuring Gnash)	2017	—	—	—	—		Storytales
"Strong" (K. Rudd featuring Gnash)	2018	—	—	—	—		In My Feels
"It's the Weekend" (Kovacs featuring Gnash)	2018	—	—	—	—		Non-album singles
"All Right" (Cisco Adler featuring Gnash)	2018	—	—	—	—		Non-album singles
"Cool Again" (Shoffy featuring Gnash)	2019	—	—	—	—		Non-album singles
"85%" (Loote featuring Gnash)	2019	—	—	—	—		Lost
"No One" (Peter Thomas featuring Gnash)	2020	—	—	—	—		TBA
"—" denotes a recording that did not chart or was not released in that territory.

=== Guest appearances ===
List of other album appearances
Title	Year	Other artist(s)	Album
"Fumes"	2016	Eden	I Think You Think Too Much of Me

== Tours ==
- The U, Me & Us Tour (2016–2017; North America and Europe)
- The Sleepover Tour (2017; North America)
- The Young Renegades Tour: Part II (2018; United States)
- The Summer After Tour (Fall of 2018; United States)
- The Broken Hearts Club Tour (Beginning of 2019)
