= Lil' Eddie =

Filipino-Puerto Rican singer-songwriter and producer (born 1988)

Lil Eddie
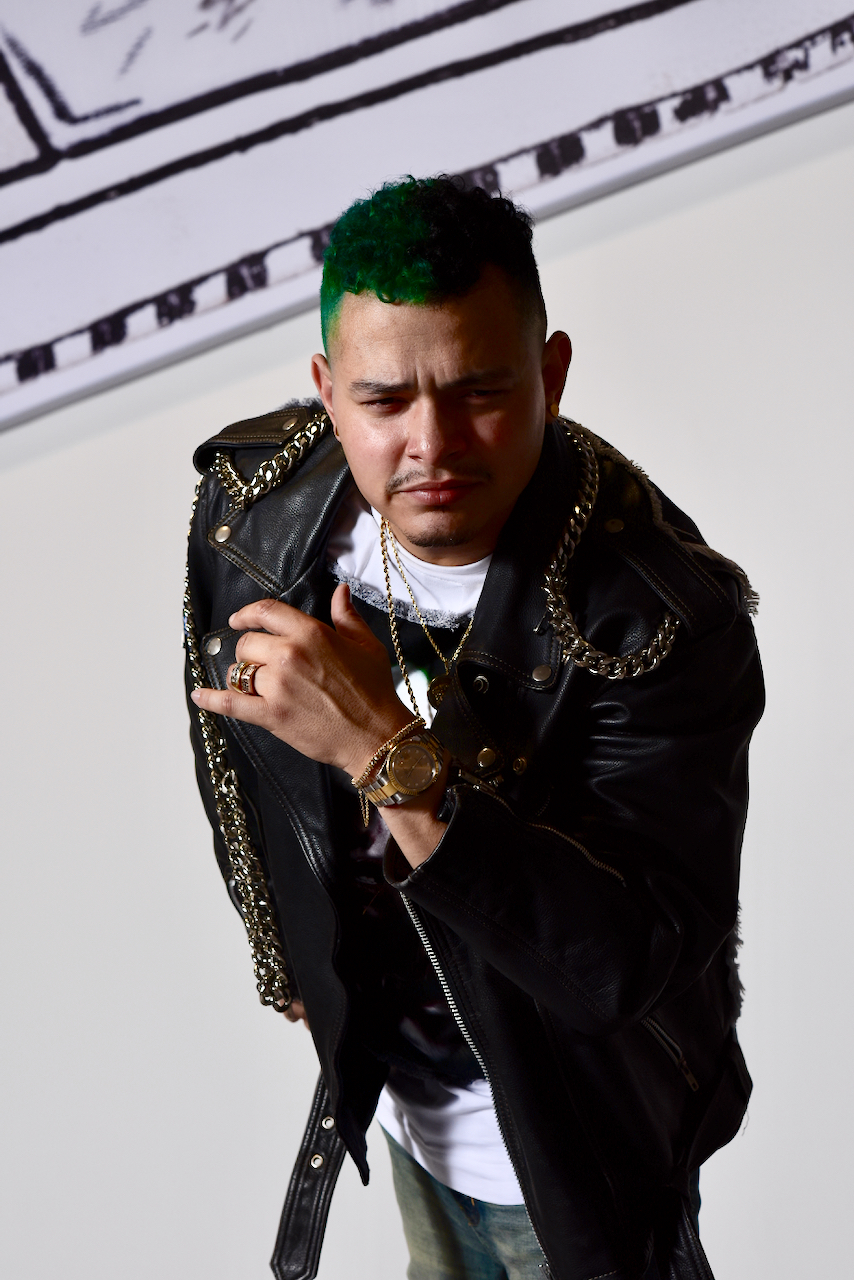
- Born: Edwin Serrano; 12 July 1988 (age 38); New York, New York
- Occupations: Singer; songwriter; record producer; reality television judge
- Years active: 2003–present
- Musical career
- Genres: Pop; hip hop soul; brown-eyed soul; R&B
- Instrument: Vocals
- Labels: EMI; Syco; Sony Music; ONErpm
- Website: www.lileddie.com

Edwin Serrano (born July 12, 1988), better known by his stage name Lil' Eddie, is a Filipino-Puerto Rican singer-songwriter and a record producer.

== Life and career ==
=== 2004–2009 ===
Previously signed to Yellowman/Big 3 Records in 2004, he left the label the following year, leaving behind an unreleased album, Nobody's Fool. He later released an album, City of My Heart, in 2009. His third studio album, Already Yours, followed two years later.

=== 2009–2014 ===
Lil Eddie joined the artist development team at The X Factor US. La Banda, America's Got Talent alongside Simon Cowell. There he helped bring together the ladies of Fifth Harmony as well as coaching the contestants season after season.The band BTS posted Lil Eddie his song "Statue" in 2013 and 2014 what made the song being Shazam top 100 song. Lil Eddie embraces his multicultural background and talents. He has produced, and written for Latin superstars Maluma, Daddy Yankee, Prince Royce and once again lent his talents to Univision's reality competition series, La Banda, where he helped develop and launch the Latin boy band, CNCO.

=== 2018–2022 ===
Some of Lil Eddie's ventures are Charlie Wilson's "Chills" which was #1 for 3 weeks on Billboard's Urban AC chart, Maluma feat. Jason Derulo's "La Ex", Eleni Foureira's Eurovision hit song "Fuego", Boy bands RAK-SU smash single "Dimelo" and Disney records bands In Real Life single "How Badly".

In 2019 Lil Eddie wrote a poem with Leslie Grace for Hispanic Heritage Month on Spotify, which was nominated for Webby Awards.

Lil Eddie made an impressive impact in Japan especially – with five #1 albums and the demand for a Greatest Hits release. In 2021 Lil Eddie has joined up with ONErpm and released his new single "Figura" on October 29. In 2021 the singer RM (rapper) of BTS posted "Statue" again on social media what made the song hit 30 million streams on Spotify and over 250 million views on YouTube.

Lil Eddie started his own label "Broken Hearts Club" in 2020. He signed his first artist "Yung Raf" and they released his first song "Outside" featuring Lil Eddie in October 17.

== Discography ==
=== Albums ===
Title	Details	
Title	Details	JAP
2004: Nobody's Fool	Released: 2004; Label: Big 3 Records; Formats: CD	1
2009: City of My Heart	Released: 28 October 2009; Label: Manhattan Recordings; Formats: CD, digital download	1
2010: City of My Heart (Deluxe)	Released: 2 June 2010; Label: Manhattan Recordings; Formats: CD, digital download	1
2011: Already Yours	Released: 28 October 2011; Label: Manhattan Recordings; Formats: CD, digital download	1
2013: Emotional	Released: 6 November 2013; Label: Manhattan Recordings; Formats: CD, digital download	1
"—" denotes an album that did not chart or was not released in that territory.

=== Singles ===
List of singles as lead artist, with selected chart positions, showing year released and album name
Title	Year	Peak chart positions							Certifications	Album
Title	Year	JAP	U.S. 100	U.S. R&B	AUS	NL	SWI	UK	Certifications	Album
Nobodys Fool	2004	1							#1 iTunes R&B Single	Nobody's fool
"I'dont think I ever" (featuring Mario Winans)	2004	1		33	11	17	13	24	#1 iTunes R&B Single	Nobody's fool
Searching for love	2009	1							#1 iTunes R&B Single	City Of My Heart
Statue	2009	—							#1 iTunes R&B Single	City Of My Heart
That one that got away	2009	1							#1 iTunes R&B Single	City Of My Heart
Trouble sleeping	2010	1							#1 iTunes R&B Single	City Of My heart (Deluxe)
Already Yours	2011	5							#1 iTunes R&B Single	Already Yours
Bring Me Back To life	2011	1							#1 iTunes R&B Single	Already Yours
I Die Everyday	2012	-								Non-album singles
Miracles (feat. T-Boz)	2013	1							#1 iTunes R&B Single	Emotional
Overlove	2018	—								Non-album singles
Island	2018	—								Non-album singles
Toma	2018	—								Non-album singles
Ten Cuidado	2018	—								Non-album singles
Outside (feat.Yung Raf)	2020	—								
Still	2020	—								Non-album singles
Figura	2021	—								Non-album singles
All I Want For Christmas Is You (Tu Amor Esta Navidad)	2021	—								Non-album singles

==== As featured artist ====
Title	Year	Peak chart positions							Certifications	Album
Title	Year	NLD	BEL	US	ROM	ALB	GR Top 100	USDance	Certifications	Album
"We Made It" (Yellow Claw featuring Lil' Eddie)	2015	27	48	187	-	-	-	1	Edison Pop – Best Dance Album	Blood for Mercy
"Gitana" (Claydee feat. Lil Eddie)	2018	-	-	-	33	22	94	-	-	-
''This Time" (James Doman feat. Lil Eddie)	2020	-	-	-	-	-	-	-	-	-
"Invisible" (Andra feat. Lil Eddie)	2021	-	-	-	22	-	-	-	-	-
"Otro" Boya feat. Lil Eddie)	2021	-	-	-	-	-	-	-	-	-
"These Days" Setou & Senyo feat. Lil Eddie	2022	-	-	-	-	-	-	-	-	-
"—" denotes a recording that did not chart or was not released in that territory.

== Songwriting credits ==
Year	Song	Artist	Album
2003	What Is Your Feeling	Dream	Reality
2004	She Is	Carl Thomas	Let's Talk About It
2004	You're the One	Guerilla Black feat. Mario Winans	Guerilla City
2004	In da Ghetto	Urban Mystic	The Ghetto Revelations
2004	Body Talk	Mario	Turning Point (demo)
2004	Last to Know	Usher	Confessions (demo)
2004	Shawty	ATL feat. Cassidy	The ATL Project
2005	Nobody	B5	B5
2005	Have Your Way with Me	Jennifer Lopez	Rebirth
2005	Thug 2Nite	Lil Rok Playaz feat. Joe	n/a
2005	Last to Know	112	Pleasure & Pain
2005	Gotta Roll	4mula1	Let's Get It
2005	Where U At Girl	4mula1	Let's Get It
2006	Good Ol'	JoJo	The High Road
2006	Coming for You	JoJo	The High Road
2006	Rising Star	Ruben Studdard	The Return
2006	Beautiful	Ruben Studdard	The Return
2006	Looking at You	P. Diddy	Press Play
2006	Push Up on Me	Monrose	Temptation
2007	Missing Piece	Joe	Ain't Nothin' Like Me
2007	Ayo	Trinity Stone	n/a
2007	All I See	Kylie Minogue	X
2007	Push Up on Me	Thara	Thara
2007	MURDER	Thara feat. Jay Sean	Thara
2007	Break My Heart	Thara	Thara
2007	Outta My System	Thara	Thara
2007	Straight to da Floor	Cheri Dennis	In and Out of Love
2008	MURDER	Jay Sean feat. Thara	My Own Way
2008	I Used to Love Her	Jay Sean	My Own Way
2008	Let Your Hair Down	Kidz in the Hall feat. Lil Eddie	The in Crowd
2008	Gemini	Israel feat. Fabolous	The Legacy
2008	Dance Like There's No Tomorrow	Paula Abdul	Randy Jackson's Music Club, Vol. 1
2008	Certified	Monrose	I Am
2008	Step Aside	Monrose	I Am
2008	Save a Little Love	Ironik	No Point in Wasting Tears
2009	Night Life	An-Ya feat.David banner	An-Ya
2009	Pretty Brown Eyes	Amerie feat. Trey Songz	In Love & War
2009	Dangerous	Amerie	In Love & War
2009	Keep the Record on Play	Outlandish	Sound of a Rebel
2009	Always Remember	Outlandish	Sound of a Rebel
2009	Nok af dig	Basim	Befri dig selv
2009	My Way	Alien Beat Club	Diversity
2010	OH Yeah	Jaicko feat. Snoop Dogg	Can I
2010	Caribbean Girl	Jaicko	Can I
2010	Beautiful People	Nina Sky	Starting Today
2010	Taste My Tongue	Lil Jon feat. Lil Eddie	n/a
2010	Spiral	w-inds.	Another World
2010	Tear Jerker	Che'Nelle	Feel Good
2010	Beat Up by a Girl	Son Dam-bi	The Queen
2010	Dance Our Way Back (into love)	Ehsan feat. Lil Eddie	Genuine
2010	All Day	Cody Simpson	4U
2010	Worldwide	Big Time Rush	BTR
2010	Alive	Mýa	Manhattan Records: Exclusive 2000–2010 DECADE BEST
2010	Heart Full of Love	El Debarge	Second Chance
2010	Home for Christmas	El Debarge	Second Chance
2010	Life of the Party	Charlie Wilson	Just Charlie
2010	Homesick	Stan Walker	From the Inside Out
2010	Chandelier	Stan Walker	From the Inside Out
2010	Remember My Name	Jordan Corey	Truth (EP)
2010	Beat of My Drum	Unique	From Brooklyn To You
2010	You Me and the Dancefloor	Unique	From Brooklyn To You
2010	Do It for Love	Unique	From Brooklyn To You
2010	Only Forever	Unique	From Brooklyn To You
2010	Million	Unique	From Brooklyn To You
2010	Cliché	Unique	From Brooklyn To You
2010	Brooklyn to You	Unique	From Brooklyn To You
2010	Every Breath	Unique	From Brooklyn To You
2011	Rainbow	Jessie J	Who You Are
2011	Fabulous Life	Mýa	K.I.S.S.
2011	K.I.S.S.	Mýa	K.I.S.S.
2011	Before You Say Goodbye	Mýa	K.I.S.S.
2011	Alive	Mýa	K.I.S.S.
2011	Sound of Love	DJ Komori featuring Cassie	Manhattan Records: The Exclusives R&B HITS Vol.4
2011	Paper Airplanes	JoJo	Jumping Trains (unreleased)
2011	Boom Boom (Tequila)	Kat Deluna	Inside Out (Japanese Version)
2011	Dat Good (prod. by Stereotypes)	Bueno feat. Lil Eddie	n/a
2011	All Day	Cody Simpson	Coast2Coast
2011	Crash	Cody Simpson	Coast2Coast
2011	Guitar Cry	Cody Simpson	Coast2Coast
2011	Besos	Paula DeAnda	n/a
2011	Lie to Me	Lalah Hathaway	Where It All Begins
2011	Live Your Life	From Above	Breaking From Above
2011	Puerto Rico	Omarion feat. Lil Eddie	The Awakening (mixtape)
2011	Rainbow	Jessie J	Who You Are
2011	Get So Crazy	Lisa Yamaguchi	Love & Pride
2012	Dance Alone	Keke Palmer	Keke Palmer
2012	Look at Me Now	Queen of Hearts	n/a
2012	Sexual Intension	MIHIRO	Cry for You
2012	Beautiful Eyes	MIHIRO	Cry for You
2012	Is Anybody Out There?	K'Naan feat. Nelly Furtado	More Beautiful Than Silence / Country, God or the Girl
2012	The Seed	K'naan	Country, God or the Girl
2012	The Sound of my Breaking Heart	K'naan	Country, God or the Girl
2012	Sleep When We Die (featuring Keith Richards)	K'naan	Country, God or the Girl
2012	Gentlemen	Cody Simpson	Preview to Paradise
2012	Back in Her Future	Julia Volkova & Dima Bilan	Eurovision 2012
2012	All Night Long	J.Burney feat. Lil Eddie	J.Burney
2012	Been Lying	Rita Ora	Ora
2012	Drink My Love Away	Tino Coury	This One's For
2012	Lego hearts	Tino Coury	This One's For
2012	Take Another Shot	Tino Coury	n/a
2012	Its A New Day	Tino Coury	n/a
2012	Left, Right, Left	Tino Coury	n/a
2012	First to make u smile	Tino Coury	n/a
2012	Our Anniversary	Charlie Wilson	Love, Charlie
2012	A Million Ways to Love You	Charlie Wilson	Love, Charlie
2012	I Still Have You	Charlie Wilson	The Best Man Holiday soundtrack
2012	Bombs Away	Kayla Brianna	n/a
2013	Heaven	DJ KOMORI & Lil' Eddie	Heaven EP
2013	Legacy	Fefe Dobson	Firebird
2013	Paint a smile	Jasmine	Forever Charlie
2013	Better Hands	Fefe Dobson	Firebird
2013	Celebrate	Fefe Dobson	Firebird
2014	Touched by an Angel	Charlie Wilson	Forever Charlie
2014	Sugar.Honey.Ice.Tea	Charlie Wilson	Forever Charlie
2014	Birthday Dress	Charlie Wilson	Forever Charlie
2014	Me and You Forever	Charlie Wilson	Forever Charlie
2014	Count on My Love	Tessanne Chin	Count on My Love
2014	People Change	Tessanne Chin	Count on My Love
2014	Never Die (featuring Lil' Eddie)	Yellow Claw	Mad Decent Amsterdam Trap Music, Vol. 2
2014	Perdóname	Prince Royce	Soy El Mismo
2014	Habla Blah Blah ft. Shy Carter	Gloria Trevi	De Película
2014	Muévelo ft. Wisin	Sofia Reyes	Louder
2014	Conmigo [Rest of Your Life]	Sofia Reyes	Louder
2014	Give Me Something	Alex & Sierra	It's About Us
2014	First Kiss	Sean Kingston & Macy Kate	First Single Single
2015	We Made it (featuring Lil' Eddie)	Yellow Claw	Blood for Mercy
2015	Higher (featuring Lil' Eddie)	Yellow Claw	Blood for Mercy
2015	Sexual (featuring Smiley)	Dorian	n/a
2015	Belong	Hilary Duff	n/a
2015	Feelings	Radio Killer	n/a
2015	Headphones	Radio Killer	n/a
2015	Latin Love (featuring Lil' Eddie)	Sore	n/a
2015	My Angel	Prince Royce	Furious 7 soundtrack
2015	Don't Wanna Dance Alone	Fifth Harmony	Better Together
2015	Love on My Mind	Sly and Robbie and Spicy Chocolate & Crystal Kay & Beenie Man	The Reggae Power
2016	El Barrio	Eden xo	n/a
2016	A Puro Dolor	MIX5	n/a
2016	Lovecation	TP4Y	n/a
2016	Take It Like a Man	TP4Y	Kisses
2016	Sniper (featuring R. City)	Sigourney K	n/a
2016	Years without Sunlight (feat. Lil' Eddie)	Tom Geiss, Mike Anton	Years Without Sunlight
2016	#FWYH (feat. Lil' Eddie)	J Sutta	Feline Resurrection
2016	Spotlight (feat. Latifa Tee)	Redfoo, DJ KOMORI	Manhattan Records The Exclusives R&B Hits Vol.7
2017	El Perdón (Forgiveness)	Nicky Jam & Enrique Iglesias	Fenix
2017	I Can't Forget You	Nicky Jam	Fenix
2017	Bingo	Jacob Sartorius	The Last Text EP
2017	Jordans	Jacob Sartorius	The Last Text EP
2017	Chills	Charlie Wilson	In It To Win It
2017	Satisfaction	LOS 5	n/a
2017	Girls	Sofia Reyes	Louder
2017	Vuelo a París	Johann Vera	n/a
2017	Pretty Girl (Tu Cancion)	Johann Vera	n/a
2017	Pretty Girl (This Ones For You)	Johann Vera	n/a
2017	Tiralo	Johann Vera	n/a
2017	Ella	Alex Hoyer	n/a
2017	U Here Tonight (featuring Dinah Jane, French Montana & Fetty Wap)	RedOne	n/a
2017	When a Women Breaks a Mans Heart	Aston Merrygold	n/a
2017	One Night in Paris	Aston Merrygold	n/a
2017	Distraction	Aston Merrygold	n/a
2017	Forever Mine (feat. Lil'Eddie)	Jose De Mara & Steve Powers	n/a
2017	No Matter What	Liam Smith & Steve Powers	n/a
2017	Last Flight To Paris	Johann Vera	n/a
2017	Dimelo (feat. Wyclef Jean & Naughty Boy)	Rak-Su	Rak-Su
2017	Mona Lisa	Rak-Su	n/a
2017	Ojo Por Ojo	Johann Vera	n/a
2017	Boom Boom (feat. Daddy Yankee, French Montana & Dinah Jane)	Red One, Daddy Yankee, French Montana, Dinah Jane	n/a
2018	Fuego (Spanish)	Eleni Foureira	n/a
2018	How Badly	In Real Life	n/a
2018	Nervioso	Johann Vera	n/a
2018	La Ex (feat. Jason Derulo)	Maluma	F.A.M.E
2018	Nervioso	Aston Merrygold	n/a
2018	Bon appetit	Aston Merrygold	n/a
2018	Poison ivy	Aston Merrygold	n/a
2018	Can't escape feat. Lil Eddie	Mike Anton	n/a
2018	Dirty blonde	Eden xo	n/a
2019	How Badly	in real life	n/a
2019	thunder	Raksu	n/a
2019	Into it	Raksu	n/a
2019	La Bomba	Raksu	n/a
2019	My love	Smiley	n/a
2019	Cry	Dalton Harris	n/a
2019	Mamacita (feat. Farruko)	Jasón Derulo	n/a
2019	Bandera	Claudia Leitte	n/a
2019	Whine Up	Aston Merrygold	n/a
2019	Loco	Sigourney K	n/a
2019	Merry kissmas	Robbie Williams	n/a
2019	Up to you	Pretty much	n/a
2019	All or nothing	No love lost	n/a
2019	Money where your mouth is	No love lost	n/a
2019	Mojados	Willie Gómez	n/a
2020	Naturally (feat. Beanie man)	Alexandra Burke	n/a
2021	Lavandia feat. Arash	Marshmallow	n/a
2021	Overboard	Aston Merrygold	n/a
2021	Baila	Eva Simons	n/a
2021	Don't make me miss you	Ray Dalton	n/a

== Filmography ==
=== Television ===
	Show	
2011	The X Factor US	Vocal Coach/Casting
2012	The X Factor US	Vocal Coach/Casting
2015	La Banda (American TV series)	Vocal Coach/Head of Music
2016	La Banda (American TV series)	Vocal Coach/Head of Music
2018	The X Factor UK	Vocal Coach/Head of Music
2019	The X Factor (The Band)	Industry expert
2019	The X Factor (Malta)	Guest Judge
2019	America's Got Talent	Senior A&R/SYCO music team
2019	British Got Talent	Senior A&R/SYCO music team
2020	British Got Talent	Senior A&R/SYCO music team
2020	America's Got Talent	Senior A&R/SYCO music team
