= RKO Radio Network =

American radio network

The RKO Radio Network was a commercial radio network that operated in the USA from 1979 to 1985. The network was a subsidiary of the RKO General broadcasting company. It became RKO Radio Networks when a second network was added in 1981. After subsequent mergers, its parent company rendered it defunct in 1994.

== History ==
When it began operations on October 1, 1979, it was the first new full-service American radio network to be launched in 40 years. It was also the first commercial radio network to distribute programming entirely by satellite. RKO was popular from the start, signing up hundreds of network affiliate radio stations from coast to coast. Its base was the RKO General-owned radio stations in New York, Los Angeles, San Francisco and other large markets. RKO initially purchased downlink satellite dishes for its affiliates, creating the nation's first satellite-delivered commercial radio network. Satellite distribution allowed high-fidelity (15 kHz) stereo programming to its affiliates.

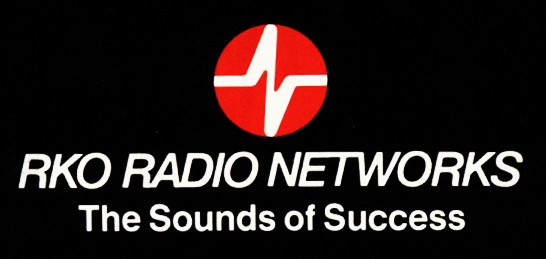
The original RKO Radio Networks logo

RKO 2 debuted on September 1, 1981, at which point the original network became known as RKO 1 and the two collectively became RKO Radio Networks.

In 1985, the RKO Radio Networks were sold to the United Stations Radio Network after advertising billing scandals involving RKO came to light. United Stations was merged with Transtar Radio Networks to form Unistar Radio Networks in 1988. Finally, in 1994, Unistar was absorbed by Westwood One, which switched its affiliates to the Mutual Broadcasting System.

== News and programming ==
The newscasts, aimed at a young adult audience, had a conversational, high-energy style developed by co-founders Dave Cooke (Vice President and News Director) and Jo Interrante (Vice President of Programming). The original network fed newscasts at :50 repeated at :00. RKO 2 was aimed at an older audience, and fed newscasts at :20 repeated at :30. Both networks offered sportscasts, music, public affairs programming and closed-circuit affiliate feeds of news and sports correspondent reports.

The networks were home to three groundbreaking long-form programs.

- NightTime America with Bob Dearborn was the first live, daily, satellite-delivered music show in radio history. Dearborn produced and hosted the five-hour adult contemporary show from January 9, 1981, until 1984.
- America Overnight, which also had its premiere on January 9, 1981, was a six-hour interview and call-in show hosted by Eric Tracey in Los Angeles and Ed Busch from Dallas. It was the first national talk show delivered by satellite. It also marked the first time a network offered simultaneous overnight programs.
- Solid Gold Saturday Night, created, produced and hosted Dick Bartley, was the first live national oldies radio show.

=== Notable broadcasts ===
The network aired the last interview with John Lennon, recorded at The Dakota just hours before his death on December 8, 1980, by Dave Sholin, a San Francisco DJ, and scriptwriter/newscaster Laurie Kaye, with radio producer Ron Hummel, who put together many music specials for RKO.

== Headquarters ==
The RKO Radio Networks were headquartered at 1440 Broadway in New York City, also the home of co-owned WOR (AM). The offices were the former headquarters of the Mutual Broadcasting System when RKO General owned Mutual. RKO also staffed news bureaus in Washington, D.C., and London.

== Staff ==
Among RKO Radio Network alumni are

- Les Coleman - White House correspondent (later CBS & ABC News London)
- Diane Dimond - Washington correspondent (later Court TV and Hard Copy)
- Gil Gross - news anchor (later with CBS Radio and ABC Radio)
- Keith Olbermann - sports anchor (later with ESPN and MSNBC)
- Steve Powers - news anchor (later WNYW-TV anchor)
- Charley Steiner - sports anchor (later ESPN anchor and Los Angeles Dodgers radio announcer)
- Nick Young - news anchor (later CBS Radio anchor)
- Kevin Gordon - news anchor (later NBC Radio Network news anchor and New York Times radio news anchor and classical music host)
- Gary McKenzie -news anchor (later with CBS Radio Networks and Business Talk Radio Network)
