= La Banda (American TV series) =

Spanish-language singing competition

- Genre: Reality television
- Created by: Simon Cowell
- Presented by: Alejandra Espinoza
- Judges: Wisin; Laura Pausini; Mario Domm; Ricky Martin; Alejandro Sanz
- Country of origin: United States
- Original languages: English, Spanish
- No. of seasons: 2
- No. of episodes: 28

Production
- Producer: Ricky Martin
- Production location: Miami, Florida
- Production companies: TelevisaUnivision; Syco Entertainment; Saban Brands; FremantleMedia North America

Original release
- Network: Univision; Las Estrellas
- Release: September 13, 2015 – December 11, 2016

La Banda ("the band") is a Spanish-language American singing competition series created by Ricky Martin and Simon Cowell, and produced by Ricky Martin. It is presented by Alejandra Espinoza. The series is a co-production between Syco Entertainment, Saban Brands and Univision.

Univision broadcast two seasons, with season 1 premiering on September 13, 2015, until December 13, 2015, with judges Ricky Martin, Laura Pausini, and Alejandro Sanz. with the goal of the series to look for talented young teens to make the next musical phenomenon. The new band entitled CNCO was composed of winners Christopher Vélez (Ecuador), Richard Camacho (Dominican Republic), Joel Pimentel (Mexico), Erick Brian Colón (Cuba), and Zabdiel de Jesús (Puerto Rico).

The show was renewed for season 2, but this time in search for the next Latin boy and girl band. It was broadcast from September 11, 2016, to December 11, 2016, with judges Wisin, Laura Pausini and Mario Domm. The new band entitled MIX5 was composed of winners Brian Cruz (Cuba), Taishmara Rivera (Puerto Rico), Christian Castro (Puerto Rico), Danelly Hoyer (Mexico), and Garmandy Candelario (Dominican Republic).

A third season was announced for 2018 season after a hiatus of one year. There were spinoffs of the La Banda series both in Mexico and Greece.

== U.S. multinational series ==
=== Season 1 ===
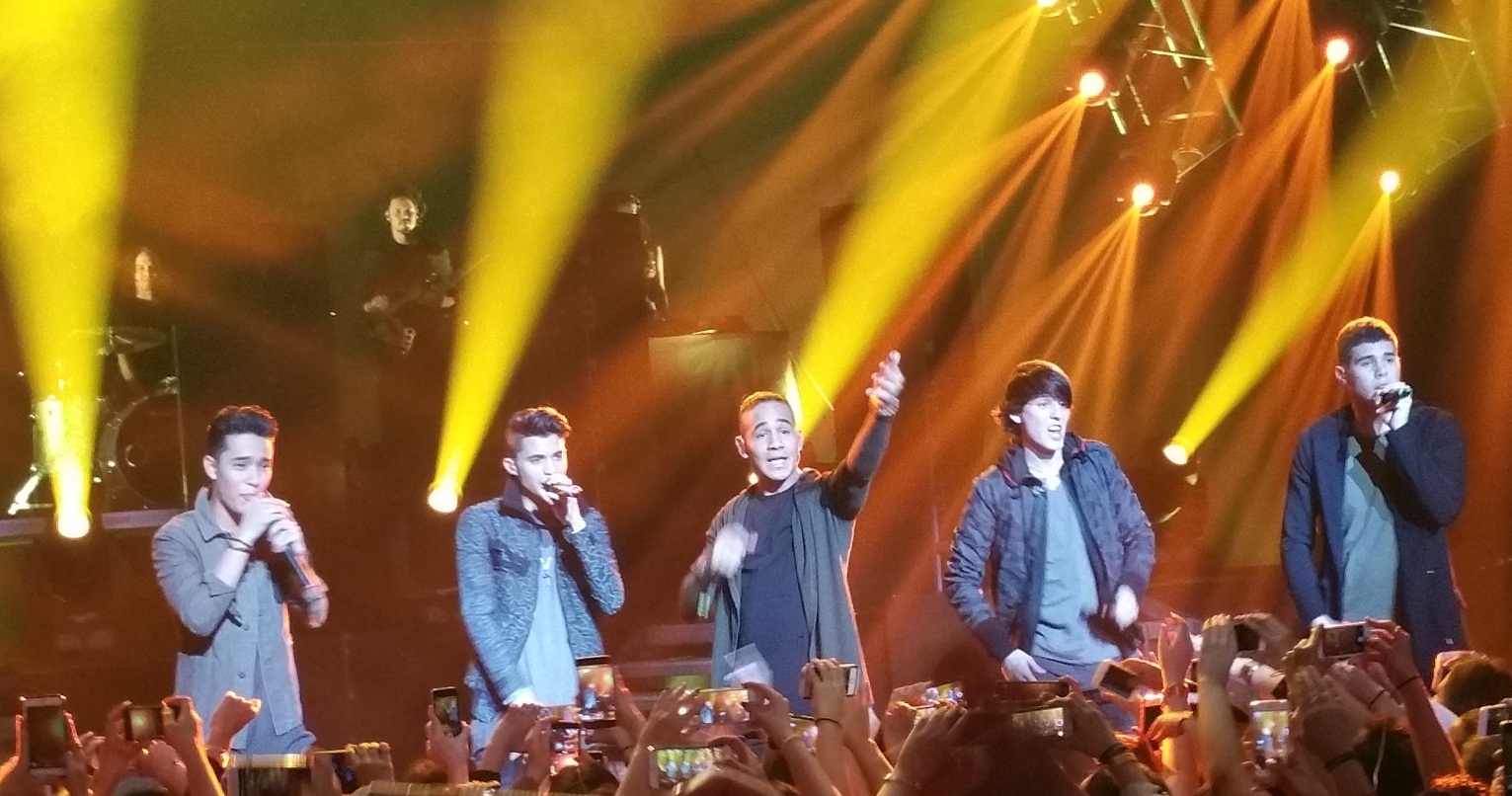
CNCO, Season 1 winners debut concert, January 30, 2016, The Fillmore Miami Beach. L-R: Joel Pimentel (Mexico), Erick Brian Colón (Cuba), Richard Camacho (Dominican Republic), Christopher Vélez (Ecuador), Zabdiel De Jesús (Puerto Rico).

Created by Ricky Martin and Simon Cowell, and produced by Ricky Martin and presented by Alejandra Espinoza, season 1 premiered on September 13, 2015, and ended on December 13, 2015. The judges in season 1 were Ricky Martin, Laura Pausini, and Alejandro Sanz. The goal of the series is to look for talented young teens to make the next musical phenomenon.

The young men listed below were voted through to the competition by at least two of the three star judges of the show. Their ages at the time of their televised audition and their Latin American countries of ethnic or national origin are also displayed.

On Season 1, there were 41 participants, with 12 from Puerto Rico, 10 from Mexico, 4 from the Dominican Republic, 3 from Cuba, Venezuela and Colombia each, the other 6 coming from various other countries like Bolivia, Ecuador, El Salvador, Honduras and the United States. The top 41 participants showed who passed the audition but failed to continue towards the second phase of the competition. The judges decided to form four five-member boy bands to perform during this phase. The fifth five-member boy band was to be made up of five of the participants left behind. After performing, the judges sent all but five boys home. The top 20 shows the participants who moved on to the third round but failed to continue on after that.

The winners were, with ages at the time of winning Christopher Vélez (20), (Ecuador), Richard Camacho (18), (Dominican Republic), Joel Pimentel (16), (Mexico), Erick Brian Colon (14), (Cuba), and Zabdiel de Jesús (18), (Puerto Rico). All five were incorporated in the new band entitled CNCO.

=== Season 2 ===
Created by Ricky Martin and Simon Cowell, and produced by Ricky Martin and presented by Alejandra Espinoza, season 2 premiered on September 11, 2016, and ended on December 11, 2016. Only judge Laura Pausini remained from season 1. The two other judges Ricky Martin and Alejandro Sanz were replaced by Wisin and Mario Domm. The goal of the series also changed. For season 2, the winners would be male and female finalists to form a boy/girl mixed band, whereas season 1 was looking for an all-male group of teens.

The young men and women listed below were voted through to the competition by at least two of the three star judges of the show. Their ages at the time of their televised audition and their Latin American countries of ethnic or national origin are also displayed.

On Season 2, there were 57 participants, with 20 from Puerto Rico, 16 from Mexico, 7 from Cuba, 4 from the Dominican Republic, 3 from Venezuela. The other 7 came from various countries including Bolivia, Ecuador, Perù and Colombia.

The winners were, with ages at the time of winning a band mixed of three boys and two girls; composed of Brian Cruz (16), (Cuba), Taishmara Rivera (16), (Puerto Rico), Christian Castro (22), (Puerto Rico), Danelly Hoyer (21), (Mexico), and Garmandy Candelario (21), (Dominican Republic). All were put together in the band entitled MIX5, though they only lasted about a year before their disbandment in early 2018.

=== Ratings ===
Season	Timeslot (ET)	Season premiere		Season finale	
Season	Timeslot (ET)	Date	Viewers (millions)	Date	Viewers (millions)
1	Sunday 8pm/7c	September 13, 2015	2.60	December 13, 2015	2.67
2	Sunday 8pm/7c	September 11, 2016	1.37	December 11, 2016	

== Franchise Spin-off series ==
=== Mexican series ===
In Mexico, a separate series was launched through channels of the Televisa group. The first season of Mexican La Banda aired on Canal 5 from October 2, 2015, until January 2016, broadcasting on Fridays at 8:00 p.m.,

Season 2 was broadcast by Las Estrellas station from October 8 to December 31, 2016, weekly on Saturdays at 1:00 p.m.

=== Greek series ===
In Greece, was to start on Open TV, but the show cancelled because there were no participants. It was confirmed from the channel that the judges were Thodoris Marantinis, Eleni Foureira and Michalis Kouinelis and the host was Anna Maria Velli.

== International versions ==
Franchise that is currently airing
Franchise with an upcoming season
Franchise that has ended

Country/Region	Local title	Network	Winner	Judges	Hosts
Arab League	Al-Fareq الفريق	MBC 1	Season 1, 2019: ?	(Syria) Mohamed Al-Daaem (1); (United Arab Emirates) Nasser Al-Ziani (1); (Saudi Arabia) Mansour Al-Harbi (1)	(Lebanon) Ammar Yousef (1)
Greece; Cyprus	La Banda	Open TV	Season 1, 2018: Cancelled	Thodoris Marantinis (1); Eleni Foureira (1); Michalis Kouinelis (1)	Anna Maria Velli (1)
Philippines	Pinoy Boyband Superstar	ABS-CBN (1)	Season 1, 2016: BoybandPH	Aga Muhlach (1); Yeng Constantino (1); Sandara Park (1); Vice Ganda (1)	Billy Crawford (1)
Portugal	La Banda – Um Grupo, Um Sonho	RTP1	Season 1, 2019: BMRNG	Carolina Deslandes (1); Miguel Cristovinho (1); Manuel Moura dos Santos (1)	Sílvia Alberto (1)
