= Under the Streetlight =

Studio album by Boyz II Men
- Released: October 20, 2017
- Genres: R&B; pop; soul; hip-hop
- Length: 29:09
- Labels: Tango; Masterworks; MSM
- Producers: Craig Sharmat; Colin O'Malley; Mark Kibble; Terry "Buzzy" Johnson; Brian McKnight; Alan "AA" Armitage; Keith Hetrick; Emile Ghantous

Boyz II Men chronology
Collide (2014)	Under the Streetlight (2017)

Under the Streetlight is the fifteenth studio album by American R&B group Boyz II Men. It was released by Tango Entertainment, Masterworks and MSM Music Group on October 20, 2017. A collection of interpretations of songs from the 1950s and 1960s, along with one original track, "Ladies Man," the album debuted and peaked at number 58 on the US Current Album Sales chart.

== Critical reception ==
Professional ratings
Review scores
Source	Rating
AllMusic	3.5/5 stars

Associated Press critic Mark Kennedy found that Under the Streetlight "manages to give each song the Boyz' soulful barbershop quartet treatment with respect and admiration for the originals, especially with a superb version of "Why Do Fools Fall in Love" [...] The Boyz may be all grown up but their skills clearly haven’t been lost." Renowned for Sound remarked that "the Men still have a solid grasp of harmony and the tightly polished ability that comes from 30 years of performing. With an array of guest performers, [...] they prove that age hasn’t dulled their harmonic abilities. The album treads a pleasant enough path, but risks alienating long-term fans eager for something a bit more contemporary."

== Chart performance ==
Under the Streetlight debuted at number 58 on the US Billboard Current Album Sales chart in the week ending November 11, 2017. The album failed to enter the US Billboard 200 and the Top R&B/Hip-Hop Albums chart, becoming the band's first album to miss both charts.

== Track listing ==
No.	Title	Writer(s)	Producer(s)	Length
1.	"Why Do Fools Fall in Love" (featuring Jimmy Merchant)	Morris Levy; Frankie Lymon	Craig Sharmat; Colin O'Malley	2:28
2.	"A Thousand Miles Away" (featuring Take 6)	James Sheppard; William Miller	Mark Kibble	2:32
3.	"Stay"	Maurice Williams	Sharmat; O'Malley	1:39
4.	"I Only Have Eyes for You"	Harry Warren; Al Dubin	Terry "Buzzy" Johnson	3:27
5.	"Up on the Roof"	Gerald Goffin; Carole King	Sharmat; O'Malley	2:48
6.	"I'll Come Running Back to You"	Sam Cooke	Brian McKnight	2:47
7.	"Tears on My Pillow"	Sylvester Bradford; Al Lewis	McKnight	3:15
8.	"A Sunday Kind of Love" (featuring Brian McKnight)	Barbara Belle; Anita Leonard Nye; Louis Prima; Stan Rhodes	McKnight; Alan "AA" Armitage	3:15
9.	"Anyone Who Knows What Love Is" (featuring Amber Riley)	Judith Arbuckle; Jeannie Seely; Pat Sheeran; Randy Newman	Sharmat; O'Malley	3:31
10.	"Ladies Man"	Emile Ghantous; Keith Hetrick; Lance Tolbert; Carlos Battey; Steven Battey; Brandon Bassir	Keith Hetrick; Emile Ghantous	3:27
Total length:				29:09

== Personnel ==
Musicians

- Richard Bravo – drums (4)
- Kim Collins – acoustic bass (1, 3, 5, 9)
- Gregory Daniel – drums (6–8)
- Emile Ghantous – programming (10)
- Rayford Griffin – drums (1, 3, 5, 9)
- Keith Hetrick – programming (10)
- Mark Hollingsworth – saxophone (3)
- Terry Johnson – guitar (4)
- Christopher Loftlin – bass (6–8)
- Brian Mann – piano (1, 3, 5, 9), organ (1, 9)
- Brian McKnight – keyboards and piano (6–8)
- Isaiah Sharkey – guitar (6–8)
- Craig Sharmat – guitar (1, 3, 5, 9), keyboard programming (1, 5, 9)
- Chris Tedesco – trumpet (3, 5), trombone (3)
- Lance Tolbert – bass (10)
- Theresa Trigg – keyboards and programming (4)
- Pete Wallace – piano (4)

Technical personnel

- Boyz II Men – executive producers
- Alan "AA" Armitage – engineer (1–5, 9, 10)
- Richard Bravo – engineer (4)
- Dom Camardrella – rhythm section and strings engineer (1, 3, 5, 9)
- Reuben Cohen – mastering
- Jorel Corpus – mix assistant
- Richard Furch – mixing
- Iker Gastaminza – engineer (4)
- Emile Ghantous – engineer (10)
- Terry Johnson – engineer (4)
- Tim Headington – executive producer
- Joe Mulvihill – executive producer
- Jason Patterson – assistant engineer (10)
- Rene Toledo – assistant engineer (10)
- Pete Wallace – engineer (4)
- Chris Wood – engineer (6–8)

== Charts ==
Chart (2017)	Peak position
Japanese Albums (Oricon)	149
US Current Album Sales (Billboard)	58

== Release history ==
Under the Streetlight release history
Region	Date	Format	Label	Ref(s)
Various	October 20, 2017	CD; digital download	Tango; Masterworks; MSM	
