= Forever Charlie =

Studio album by Charlie Wilson
- Released: January 27, 2015
- Length: 46:17
- Label: RCA
- Producers: Charlie Wilson; The Avila Brothers; Steve Daly; Emile Ghantous; Keith Hetrick; Jimmy Jam & Terry Lewis; Gregg Pagani

Charlie Wilson chronology
Love, Charlie (2013)	Forever Charlie (2015)	In It to Win It (2017)

Singles from Forever Charlie
- 1. "Goodnight Kisses" Released: October 7, 2014; 2. "Touched by an Angel" Released: December 15, 2014

Forever Charlie is the seventh studio album by American R&B singer-songwriter Charlie Wilson. It was released on January 27, 2015, by RCA Records. The album was supported by two singles: "Goodnight Kisses" and "Touched by an Angel". It includes collaborations with Snoop Dogg and Shaggy and was nominated in the category Best R&B Album at the 58th Annual Grammy Awards.

== Critical reception ==
Professional ratings
Review scores
Source	Rating
AllMusic	3.5/5 stars

AllMusic editor Andy Kellman called the album "as pleasing and upbeat as any solo work that preceded it. Wilson might be short on ideas for album titles, but uplifting love songs – many of which were made with wife Mahin Wilson and producer Greg Pagani – continue to flow, and the singer's voice remains an energizing force [...] Cynics could take it all as relying upon past glories, but the material is too fresh-sounding, too joyous, to disregard."

== Commercial performance ==
The album debuted at number 17 on the Billboard 200, selling 25,000 copies.

== Track listing ==
Forever Charlie track listing
No.	Title	Writer(s)	Producer(s)	Length
1.	"Somebody Loves You"	Charlie Wilson, Emile Ghantous, Steve Daly, Keith Hetrick, Sam Salter, Sid Jain, Gregg Pagani, Mahin Wilson, Michael Paran	Ghantous, Daly, Hetrick	3:32
2.	"Touched by an Angel"	Pagani, Lance Tolbert, Edwin Serrano, C, Wilson, M. Wilson, Paran	Pagani, C. Wilson	4:02
3.	"Goodnight Kisses"	C. Wilson, Ghantous, Erik Nelson, Tolbert, Brandon Bassir, M. Wilson, Paran	Ghantous, C. Wilson	3:36
4.	"Just Like Summertime"	Pagani, Tolbert, Carlos Battey, Steven Battey, Ayanna Ray, C. Wilson, M. Wilson, M. Paran	Pagani, C. Wilson	3:40
5.	"Unforgettable" (featuring Shaggy)	C. Wilson, Ghantous, Daly, Hetrick, M. Wilson, Paran, Orville Burrell, Bob Marley	Ghantous, Daly, Hetrick	4:08
6.	"Sugar.Honey.Ice.Tea"	Pagani, Rodney Thomas, Serrano, C. Wilson, M. Wilson, Paran, Otha Leon Haywood	Pagani, C. Wilson	3:13
7.	"My Favorite Part of You"	Pagani, Thomas, Jimmy Burney, Damon Sharpe, C. Wilson, M. Wilson, Paran	Pagani, C. Wilson	4:28
8.	"Infectious" (featuring Snoop Dogg)	C. Wilson, Ghantous, Daly, Hetrick, Salter, Marlon McClain, Calvin Broadus, M. Wilson, M. Paran	Ghantous, Daly, Hetrick	3:58
9.	"Hey Lover"	James Harris III, Terry Lewis, C. Wilson, Val Young, Bobby Avila, Issiah Avila, James Q. Wright	Jimmy Jam & Terry Lewis	4:29
10.	"Things You Do"	Harris III, Lewis, C. Wilson, Young	Jimmy Jam & Terry Lewis	4:17
11.	"Birthday Dress"	Pagani, Burney, Serrano, C. Wilson, M. Wilson, Paran	Pagani, C. Wilson	3:16
12.	"Me and You Forever"	Harris III, Lewis, C. Wilson, Serrano, B. Avila, I. Avila	Jimmy Jam & Terry Lewis, The Avila Brothers	4:04
Total length:				46:17

Notes

- "Unforgettable" contains a portion of the composition "Waiting in Vain" written by Bob Marley.
- "Sugar.Honey.Ice.Tea" contains a portion of the composition "She's a Bad Mama Jama" written by Otha Leon Haywood.

== Charts ==
=== Weekly charts ===
Weekly chart performance for Forever Charlie
Chart (2015)	Peak position
US Billboard 200	17
US Top R&B/Hip-Hop Albums (Billboard)	2
US Indie Store Album Sales (Billboard)	17

=== Year-end charts ===
Year-end chart performance for Forever Charlie
Chart (2015)	Peak position
US Top R&B/Hip-Hop Albums (Billboard)	39
US R&B Albums (Billboard)	14

== Release history ==
Release history and formats for Forever Charlie
Region	Date	Format(s)	Label	Ref
United States	January 27, 2015	CD; digital download	RCA	
