= Collide (Boyz II Men album) =

Studio album by Boyz II Men
- Released: October 21, 2014
- Genres: R&B; pop; hip-hop soul; EDM; rock n roll
- Length: 42:25
- Labels: MSM Music; BMG Rights
- Producers: Ambience; Jim Beanz; The Composer; Steve Daly; Dem Jointz; Fridolin; Emile Ghantous; Keith Hetrick; Alvin Isaacs; Mizzle; The Monsters and the Strangerz; The Page Brothers; Adam Pallin; Aaron Pearce; Synematik; Matt Radosevich; John Ryan; Anthony L. Saunders; Lucas Secon

Boyz II Men chronology
Twenty (2011)	Collide (2014)	Under the Streetlight (2017)

Collide is the fourteenth studio album by American R&B group Boyz II Men. It was released by MSM Music Group and BMG Rights Management on October 21, 2014.

== Critical reception ==
Professional ratings
Review scores
Source	Rating
AllMusic	2.5/5 stars

Andy Kellman of AllMusic said, "This is easily the group's most scattered album, as it offers various shades of ballads, some throwbacks, oddly escapist adult alternative fare, and even anthemic rockers. Many of them blur the line between fresh changes of pace and ill-suited switch-ups. "Already Gone," one that falls toward the latter, is schizophrenic itself, as it bounds between early-'80s arena rock and EDM. It's also one of many songs in which Auto-Tune is used—easily the album's most baffling characteristic."

== Track listing ==
Credits adapted from the album's liner notes.

No.	Title	Writer(s)	Producer(s)	Length
1.	"Me Myself & I"	Keithin Pittman	Mizzle	3:13
2.	"What Happens in Vegas"	Brandon Lowry; Adam Pallin	Pallin	2:48
3.	"Diamond Eyes"	Coley O'Toole	Matt Radosevich	4:19
4.	"Better Half"	Terence Coles; Alvin Isaacs; Samuel Jean; Bryan Nelson; Herman William Schleifer	The Composer; Isaacs	2:58
5.	"Underwater"	Coles; Fridolin Nordsø; Lucas Secon	Nordsø; Secon	3:48
6.	"Believe Us"	Dwayne Abernathy; David Debrandon Brown	Dem Jointz	3:37
7.	"Don't Stop"	Adeniyi Adelekan; Corey Gibson; Bryant Page; Lucius Page	Synematik; The Page Brothers	2:57
8.	"Already Gone"	Clarence Coffee, Jr.; Jordan Johnson; Stefan Johnson; Marcus Lomax	The Monsters and the Strangerz	3:12
9.	"As Long As I'm With You"	Nasri Atweh; Daniel Capellaro; Steve Daly; Emile Ghantous; Erik Nelson; Mark Robertson	Ghantous; Daly; Nelson^{[a]}; Keith Hetrick^{[a]}	3:34
10.	"Losing Sleep"	Jared Cotter; Negin Djafari; Aaron Pearce; Damon Sharpe; James Washington	Pearce; Jim Beanz	4:11
11.	"So What"	Jennifer Decilveo; John Ryan	Ryan	3:28
12.	"Collide"	Chris Batson; Scott Effman; Lukas Nathanson	Ambience	4:04

iTunes bonus track
No.	Title	Writer(s)	Producer(s)	Length
13.	"Ladies Man"	Brandon Bassir; Carlos Battey; Ghantous; Hetrick; Lance Tolbert; Steven Battey	Ghantous; Hetrick	3:48

Target deluxe edition bonus tracks
No.	Title	Writer(s)	Producer(s)	Length
13.	"Beautiful"	Anthony L. Saunders	Saunders	5:42
14.	"Can't Let Go" (featuring Machel Montano)		Full Blown Entertainment; Fisherman Project; De Red Boyz; Montano	4:30

Notes

- ^{^[a]} denotes a co-producer

== Charts ==
Chart (2014)	Peak position
US Billboard 200	37
US Independent Albums (Billboard)	5
US Top R&B/Hip-Hop Albums (Billboard)	6

== Release history ==
Collide release history
Region	Date	Format	Label	Ref(s)
Various	October 21, 2014	CD; digital download	MSM; BMG Rights	
