= Keith Hetrick =

American singer

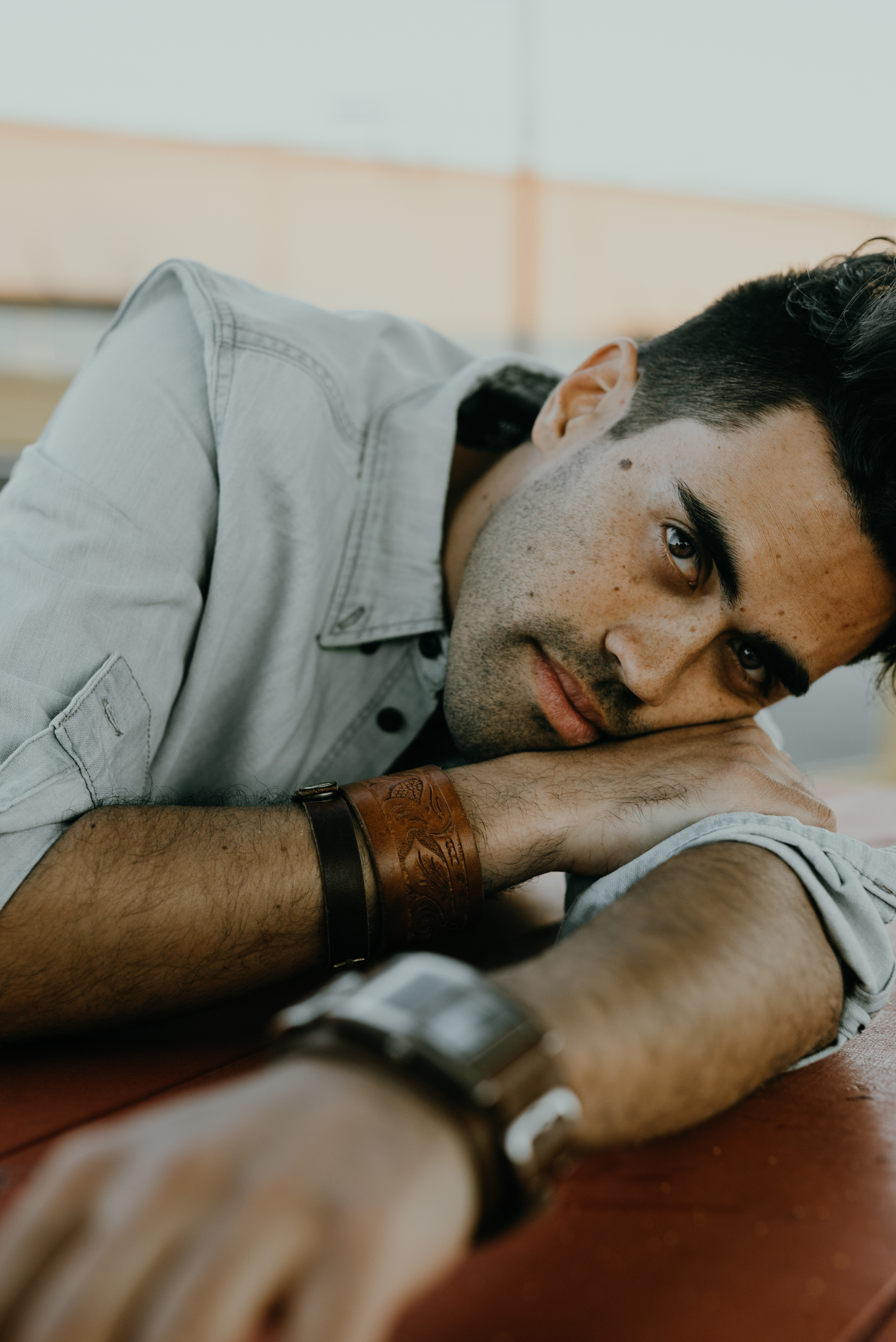

Background information
- Born: Keith Justin Hetrick; March 8, 1988 (age 38); Huntington Beach, California, US
- Origin: Nashville, Tennessee, US
- Genres: Pop, soul, folk, R&B
- Occupations: Songwriter, musician, record producer, vocal producer/arranger
- Instruments: Piano, keyboard, guitar

Keith Justin Hetrick is a Grammy-nominated American songwriter and record producer based in Nashville, Tennessee. He has worked with notable artists such as Jennifer Lopez, Boyz II Men, Snoop Dogg, Charlie Wilson, Shaggy, T.I., Pitbull, Now United, Fifth Harmony, GOT7, NCT, Cher Lloyd, Roy Wang, Nine Percent, Wanna One, Aston Merrygold, Silentó, The Jacksons, Ray Parker Jr., Teddy Riley, Paulina Rubio, Sophia Grace, and Inna.

== Career ==
In 2016, Hetrick was nominated for a Grammy Award for his writing and production work on the Charlie Wilson album Forever Charlie, which included the songs "Unforgettable" (featuring Shaggy), "Infectious" (featuring Snoop Dogg), and the opening track "Somebody Loves You." Forever Charlie also gartered an NAACP nomination for “Outstanding Album."

In August 2016, ISINA artist New District released the single "Ain't Got Money," which Hetrick wrote and co-produced alongside industry heavyweight Randy Jackson. In December of that same year, Hetrick wrote and produced three songs on the NAACP-nominated Charlie Wilson album In It To Win It, including the lead single "I'm Blessed" (featuring T.I.), which went to No. 1 on both the Billboard R&B charts and Hot Gospel charts in early 2017. “I’m Blessed” was nominated for an NAACP Award for “Best Duo or Group," as well winning as an ASCAP Rhythm & Soul Award for most airplay on the R&B and Gospel charts.

Charlie Wilson follow-up single "Good Time" featured Pitbull, Teddy Riley and Ray Parker Jr., to which Hetrick is also responsible for.

Hetrick has also had a string of releases with Korean, Japanese and Chinese artists like Girl's Day, A.O.A., SEEART, and the full Season 2 cast of the hit Korean-based talent show Produce 101. Song releases include the singles "Whatta Man (Good Man)" by I.O.I, "Can't Stop Won't Stop Loving You" by Japanese artist Daichi Miura, the self-titled single "Playback" by South-Korean group Playback, and "So Beautiful" by South-Korean artist Jin Won. Particularly, "It's Me (Pick Me)," a 2017 single by K-pop group Wanna One, was described as "one of the most influential and memorable K-pop songs of 2017". It later went on to become a certified platinum single.

Rounding out his 2017, the Make-a-Wish Foundation used the Madison McWilliams song "Fighter" (which Hetrick co-wrote and produced) for their campaign in the Texas and Southern US regions.

In September 2018, Hetrick partnered up with End Slavery to perform at their annual Voices of Freedom event, in hopes of raising awareness to human trafficking and sex slavery in the state of Tennessee.

In August 2020, Hetrick wrote/produced the song "Feel It Now" (performed by the group Now United), that was used by Pepsi for their #FeelItNow & #ForTheLoveOfIt international campaign. Also, in October of that same year, the Now United song "Come Together" won "Best International Hit" at the Nickelodeon Kids Choice Awards (Meus Prêmios Nick) in Brazil.

In March 2021, Now United partnered up with Kit Kat to release the songs "Turn It Up" & "Fiesta," along with accompanying limited edition bar on Kit Kat's "Break Society" platform, to which Keith wrote & produced. The special edition bar reflects Now United's colors with 12 different colored fingers.

Hetrick produced the song On My Way for the 2022 Universal Pictures film Marry Me.

Hetrick has had songs on ABC's The Today Show, Dancing With The Stars, NBC's Jimmy Kimmel Live!, CBS's The Talk, the Netflix series Unplanned America, Lifetime's UnREAL, MTV's Finding Carter, VH1 and BET's Hit The Floor, as well commercials, local TV shows, and airliners all around the world.

== Discography ==
Year	Song	Artist	Album	Label
2013	Take Me Down To Mexico	Inna	Party Never Ends	Roton
2014	As Long As I'm With You	Boyz II Men	Collide	BMG
2014	Ladies Man	Boyz II Men	Collide	BMG
2014	Get To Know You	IM5		
2015	Bad Mutha	Benj	Snack Pack, Vol. 1	Latium Entertainment
2015	What I Like (feat. Cher Lloyd)	Benj	Snack Pack, Vol. 1	Latium Entertainment
2015	Somebody Loves You	Charlie Wilson	Forever Charlie	RCA Records
2015	Infectious (feat. Snoop Dogg)	Charlie Wilson	Forever Charlie	RCA Records
2015	Unforgettable (feat. Shaggy)	Charlie Wilson	Forever Charlie	RCA Records
2016	Playback	Playback (South Korean band)	single	Clear Company
2016	Closer	New District		ISINA records, LLC
2016	Ain't Got Money	New District		ISINA records, LLC
2016	Girl In The Mirror (feat. Silentó)	Sophia Grace	Hollywood EP	SGE / Universal
2016	Whatta Man (Good Man)	I.O.I		YMC Entertainment
2016	So Beautiful	Jin Won		Loen Entertainment Inc
2016	Cupcake (All This Love) feat. Hanhae	SEEART		Yama & Hot Chicks Entertainment
2016	Smoke From Distant Fires	Will Jay		
2016	Christmas Come Early	Will Jay		
2016	The Christmas Song	Sonika Vaid		
2016	I'm Blessed (feat. T.I.)	Charlie Wilson	single	RCA Records
2017	Good Time (feat. Pitbull)	Charlie Wilson	In It to Win It	RCA Records
2017	Precious Love	Charlie Wilson	In It to Win It	RCA Records
2017	U.K. Girl	Sophia Grace	Hollywood EP	SGE / Universal
2017	Notayo	Claydee		Down2Earth
2017	I Like It Like That	Sara Serena	Skyline	Nexar
2017	Five Years	Sara Serena	Skyline	Nexar
2017	Can't Stop Won't Stop Loving You	Daichi Miura	HIT	Avex / Sonic Groove
2017	I'll Be Yours	Girl's Day	Girl's Day Everyday #5	DreamT Entertainment
2017	It's Me (Pick Me)	Produce 101 Season 2 & Wanna One		CJ E&M
2017	Coins	Savannah Outen		
2017	If This Is Love	RYDYR	WOLF	
2017	Wonderful Life (feat. Olivia O'Brien)	RYDYR	WOLF	
2017	Burn and Crash	Madison McWilliams	Madison - EP	
2017	We've Got Today	Madison McWilliams	Madison - EP	
2017	Fighter	Madison McWilliams	Madison - EP	
2017	Can't Live Without Your Love	Jesse Campbell		Desta Holdings / Hiz Media
2017	Ladies Man	Boyz II Men	Under The Streetlight	Sony Masterworks
2018	Down For You (feat. RYDYR & Alex Moore)	Alex Ritchie		Alex Ritchie Music
2018	파르페 (Parfait)	AOA	Bingle Bangle	FNC Entertainment
2018	Don't Drag Me Down	Marie Wise-Hawkins	The Road Back To Me	
2018	Living For The Weekend	Madison McWilliams		
2018	Waste Away	Jaira Burns	Burn Slow	Interscope
2018	Change In The Water	Carah Faye Charnow	Watch Me	
2018	Rule Breaker	Nine Percent	To The Nines	Sony Music
2018	XXX	Nine Percent	To The Nines	Sony Music
2018	Wagon Train Lover	King Margo	Barely Gettin' By	
2018	No More Goodbyes	King Margo	Barely Gettin' By	
2018	Everything Is My Fault	King Margo	Barely Gettin' By	
2018	Baby's All Right	King Margo	Barely Gettin' By	
2018	Don't Lose Your Marbles	King Margo	Barely Gettin' By	
2018	Volunteer State of Mind	King Margo	Barely Gettin' By	
2018	Big Girl Cups	King Margo	Barely Gettin' By	
2018	Gotta Go	King Margo	Barely Gettin' By	
2018	Bones	King Margo	Barely Gettin' By	
2018	Pickin' Off The Pickers	King Margo	Barely Gettin' By	
2018	Determined Man "(孤注)"	Roy Wang		TF Entertainment
2018	Tinsel Town (Fa La La Land)	The Lady & The Gent		Hummingbird Hills, LLC
2019	Harvest Moon	The Lady & The Gent		Hummingbird Hills, LLC
2019	Momentum	NSUO	The Sky Is Fiction	Hummingbird Hills, LLC
2019	The Meeting	NSUO	The Sky Is Fiction	Hummingbird Hills, LLC
2019	Set Me On Fire	NSUO	The Sky Is Fiction	Hummingbird Hills, LLC
2019	Bleeding Thru Blinds	NSUO	The Sky Is Fiction	Hummingbird Hills, LLC
2019	All That Matters	NSUO	The Sky Is Fiction	Hummingbird Hills, LLC
2019	Phosphorescent (The Knock)	NSUO	The Sky Is Fiction	Hummingbird Hills, LLC
2019	M N D S T	NSUO	The Sky Is Fiction	Hummingbird Hills, LLC
2019	The Gambling Priest	NSUO	The Sky Is Fiction	Hummingbird Hills, LLC
2019	sHANGri-LA [city wizdumb]	NSUO	The Sky Is Fiction	Hummingbird Hills, LLC
2019	Quantum Obscuriuum	NSUO	The Sky Is Fiction	Hummingbird Hills, LLC
2019	Levy Breaking	NSUO	The Sky Is Fiction	Hummingbird Hills, LLC
2019	Raumzeichnung (The Drawing Room)	NSUO	The Sky Is Fiction	Hummingbird Hills, LLC
2019	Synthphony in C Major	NSUO	The Sky Is Fiction	Hummingbird Hills, LLC
2019	In Suspended Animation	NSUO	The Sky Is Fiction	Hummingbird Hills, LLC
2019	Where Do We Go?	NSUO		Hummingbird Hills, LLC
2019	2U4U	NSUO		Hummingbird Hills, LLC
2019	Want It?	ITZY	It'z Different	JYP Entertainment
2019	Drunk On You	Jus2	FOCUS	JYP Entertainment
2019	Rocket Boom	Rocket Girls 101		Sony Music / Tencent
2019	8Smoov & The Reckless Brains	NSUO	Beach Tapes, Vol. 1	Hummingbird Hills, LLC
2019	Converse Nation	NSUO	Beach Tapes, Vol. 1	Hummingbird Hills, LLC
2019	indiviDIGITAL pt. 1	NSUO	Beach Tapes, Vol. 1	Hummingbird Hills, LLC
2019	indiviDIGITAL pt. 2	NSUO	Beach Tapes, Vol. 1	Hummingbird Hills, LLC
2019	CHillCyphDil	NSUO	Beach Tapes, Vol. 1	Hummingbird Hills, LLC
2019	indie & the beats	NSUO	Beach Tapes, Vol. 1	Hummingbird Hills, LLC
2019	Mainframe	NSUO	Beach Tapes, Vol. 1	Hummingbird Hills, LLC
2019	Hitus.Power	NSUO	Beach Tapes, Vol. 1	Hummingbird Hills, LLC
2019	whyyyCANTweBEEEEfrieeends	NSUO	Beach Tapes, Vol. 1	Hummingbird Hills, LLC
2019	sumpn bout tha kickback kid	NSUO	Beach Tapes, Vol. 1	Hummingbird Hills, LLC
2019	Paintings & Portraits of Strange & Unusual Things (Breakfast in the Afternoon)	NSUO	Beach Tapes, Vol. 1	Hummingbird Hills, LLC
2019	Meta-Cosmoz	NSUO	Beach Tapes, Vol. 1	Hummingbird Hills, LLC
2019	All of Me is Mostly Brain Dead; an Introspective	NSUO	Beach Tapes, Vol. 1	Hummingbird Hills, LLC
2019	And What's Left of Me is Hiding in Spaces Between Words; an Outrospective	NSUO	Beach Tapes, Vol. 1	Hummingbird Hills, LLC
2019	nonversationalism	NSUO	Beach Tapes, Vol. 2	Hummingbird Hills, LLC
2019	wonder	NSUO	Beach Tapes, Vol. 2	Hummingbird Hills, LLC
2019	undecided	NSUO	Beach Tapes, Vol. 2	Hummingbird Hills, LLC
2019	tonight / time	NSUO	Beach Tapes, Vol. 2	Hummingbird Hills, LLC
2019	nessuno	NSUO	Beach Tapes, Vol. 2	Hummingbird Hills, LLC
2019	nuni	NSUO	Beach Tapes, Vol. 2	Hummingbird Hills, LLC
2019	distractions	NSUO	Beach Tapes, Vol. 2	Hummingbird Hills, LLC
2019	drowning / swimming	NSUO	Beach Tapes, Vol. 2	Hummingbird Hills, LLC
2019	xxzxcuzxx / aka / panoramic / paranoia	NSUO	Beach Tapes, Vol. 2	Hummingbird Hills, LLC
2019	waiting	NSUO	Beach Tapes, Vol. 2	Hummingbird Hills, LLC
2019	caught / in / the / middle	NSUO	Beach Tapes, Vol. 2	Hummingbird Hills, LLC
2019	daydreaming / about / coffee / dates / with / van gogh	NSUO	Beach Tapes, Vol. 2	Hummingbird Hills, LLC
2019	Up All Night, Pt. 1	NSUO	Up All Night, The Quiet High, & The Morning After	Hummingbird Hills, LLC
2019	Up All Night, Pt. 2/The Quiet High	NSUO	Up All Night, The Quiet High, & The Morning After	Hummingbird Hills, LLC
2019	The Morning After	NSUO	Up All Night, The Quiet High, & The Morning After	Hummingbird Hills, LLC
2019	Figure It Out	Teddi Gold		
2019	Priority	Csöke		Top Dog Recordings
2019	Lovin' Too Hard	Annaya		
2019	Want It? (Imad Royal Remix)	ITZY	It'z Icy	JYP Entertainment
2019	Give It All (Wedding Song)	Drew Ryn		
2020	Come Together	Now United		XIX Entertainment / AWAL
2020	By My Side	Now United		XIX Entertainment / AWAL
2020	Feel It Now	Now United		XIX Entertainment / AWAL
2020	Habibi	Now United		XIX Entertainment / AWAL
2020	حبيبي	Now United		XIX Entertainment / AWAL
2020	Hewale	Now United		XIX Entertainment / AWAL
2020	Trust My Love	Got7	DYE	JYP Entertainment / Sony Music Entertainment Japan
2020	Annie Oakley	Cassandra Sotos		
2020	Isn't You	Alex Ritchie		Alex Ritchie Music
2020	Better	Nikita Karmen		November Records / EMPIRE
2020	Misfit	NCT U	NCT 2020 Resonance Pt. 1	SM Entertainment / Dreamus / Capitol / Caroline
2020	Fly Away	RYDYR	These Things Always Change	Shadow Wood Records
2020	Flight	RYDYR	These Things Always Change	Shadow Wood Records
2020	Past Midnight	The Southern Gothic		
2020	On The Way	Jon Robert Hall		HallPass / EMPIRE
2021	Lean On Me	Now United		XIX Entertainment / AWAL
2021	Turn It Up	Now United		XIX Entertainment / AWAL
2021	Fiesta	Now United		XIX Entertainment / AWAL
2021	Badna Nghanni	Now United		XIX Entertainment / AWAL
2021	I Got You	Now United		XIX Entertainment / AWAL
2021	On My Way	Jennifer Lopez	Marry Me	Universal Pictures / Sony Music Latin
2022	It's Your Birthday	Now United		XIX Entertainment / AWAL
2022	On My Way	Jimmie Allen	Tulip Drive	Stoney Creek Records
2023	Love Louder	The Meeps	The Meeps Drop “Love Louder”	
2023	Love Me Crazy	Lim Kim & Jaime	SM Station	SM Entertainment
2023	Dabke	Now United		XIX Entertainment / AWAL
2023	Rodeo In Tokyo	Now United		XIX Entertainment / AWAL
2023	Flex That Ego	Now United		XIX Entertainment / AWAL
2023	Somewhere In Mexico	Marie Wise-Hawkins		
2023	Find Me On A Beach	Marie Wise-Hawkins		
2023	Island Time	Marie Wise-Hawkins		
2023	There's A House ft. Sid Tipton & Keith Hetrick	The Road		J-Ky Music
2023	Go	Alex Ritchie		Alex Ritchie Music
2023	The Ride	Robby Longo		RL Records / Buzzard
