= Goodnight Kisses =

Single by Charlie Wilson

from the album Forever Charlie
- Released: October 7, 2014
- Recorded: 2014
- Genre: R&B; Soul
- Length: 3:37
- Label: RCA
- Songwriters: Charlie Wilson; Emile Ghantous; Erik Nelson; Tolbert; Brandon Bassir; Mahin Wilson; Michael Paran
- Producers: Charlie Wilson; Emile Ghantous

Charlie Wilson singles chronology
"I Still Have You" (2013)	"Goodnight Kisses" (2014)	"Peaches N Cream" (2015)

"Goodnight Kisses" is a song by American R&B singer Charlie Wilson. It was released on October 7, 2014. The song is the first single from the seventh studio album Forever Charlie (2015).

== Track listing ==
- Digital download
1. "Goodnight Kisses" — 3:37

== Music video ==
On October 7, 2014, Charlie uploaded the audio video for "Goodnight Kisses" on his YouTube and Vevo account.

== Chart performance ==
Chart (2015)	Peak position
US Adult R&B Songs (Billboard)	6
US R&B/Hip-Hop Airplay (Billboard)	26
