= Johann Vera =

Ecuadorian singer and actor (born 1995)

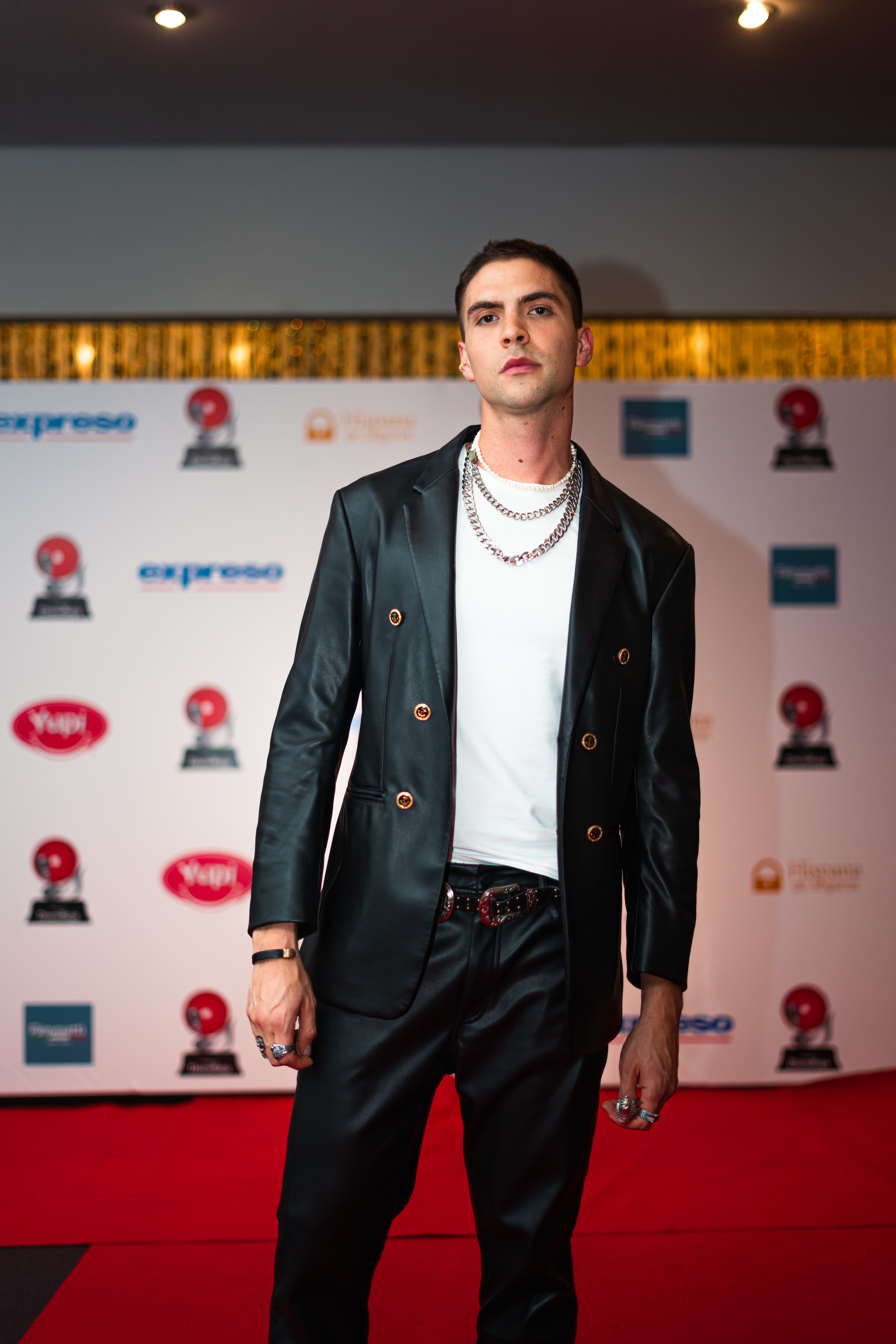
- Johann Vera - Latin Grammy 2017

Background information
- Born: Johann Alexander Vera Tapia; December 4, 1995 (age 30); Guayaquil, Ecuador
- Occupations: Singer; songwriter; actor
- Years active: 2006–present
- Musical career
- Genres: Latin pop; pop; Reggaeton
- Instrument: Vocals

Johann Alexander Vera Tapia (December 4, 1995) better known as Johann Vera, is an Ecuadorian singer, songwriter, and actor from Guayaquil.

He started his career at 10 years old by participating in the RCN show Factor X alongside Camilo and Greeicy. He then participated in La Banda, a reality TV-Show created by Ricky Martin and Simon Cowell. In both instances, he ended up in the finalists group.

Working as an independent artist, he has released various singles such as “Donde Nací”, “Vuelo a París” and “Pretty Girl”, and appeared on TV Shows such as Disney Channel's Champeta, Nickelodeon's Club 57, Kally's Mash Up, among others.

On 2020, Vera represented Ecuador on the Viña del Mar International Song Festival, winning a "Gaviota de Plata" (Silver Seagull) award; The second ever received by an Ecuadorian artist.

== Personal life ==
Johann Alexander Vera Tapia was born on Guayaquil, December 4, 1995 to Jayo Vera and Shirley Tapia. He has a younger sister named Stephanie and an older brother named Christian.

When Johann turned six, the family moved to Bogotá, where he lived for the next 10 years and met most of his lifelong friends. During his time in Colombia he participated on Factor X and later joined MISI, a well known arts academy.

Graduating high school at 15 years old, he moved to the United States, where he could better pursue his life-long dream. He worked as an extra on TV shows and commercials; but his life changed on 2015 when he joined La Banda by Univisión.

As of 2022, he resides in Miami, Florida and remains working as an independent artist. He has been releasing music every year, acting, and posting on his YouTube channel.

== Career ==
Vera got started as a singer at the age of nine on the RCN show Factor X, where his position as finalist, alongside Camilo and Greeicy, allowed him to access a scholarship to the MISI arts academy. After moving to the US, he participated on the 2015 Univisión show La Banda where he worked with notorious singers such as Ricky Martin, Simon Cowell, Alejandro Sanz and Laura Pausini.

In August 2016, he released his first independent single and music video, "Pretty Girl (Tu Canción)". The video was mostly recorded in Los Angeles. Later in that year, he also released a single called "Tíralo" with the music video being recorded in Bogota, Colombia.

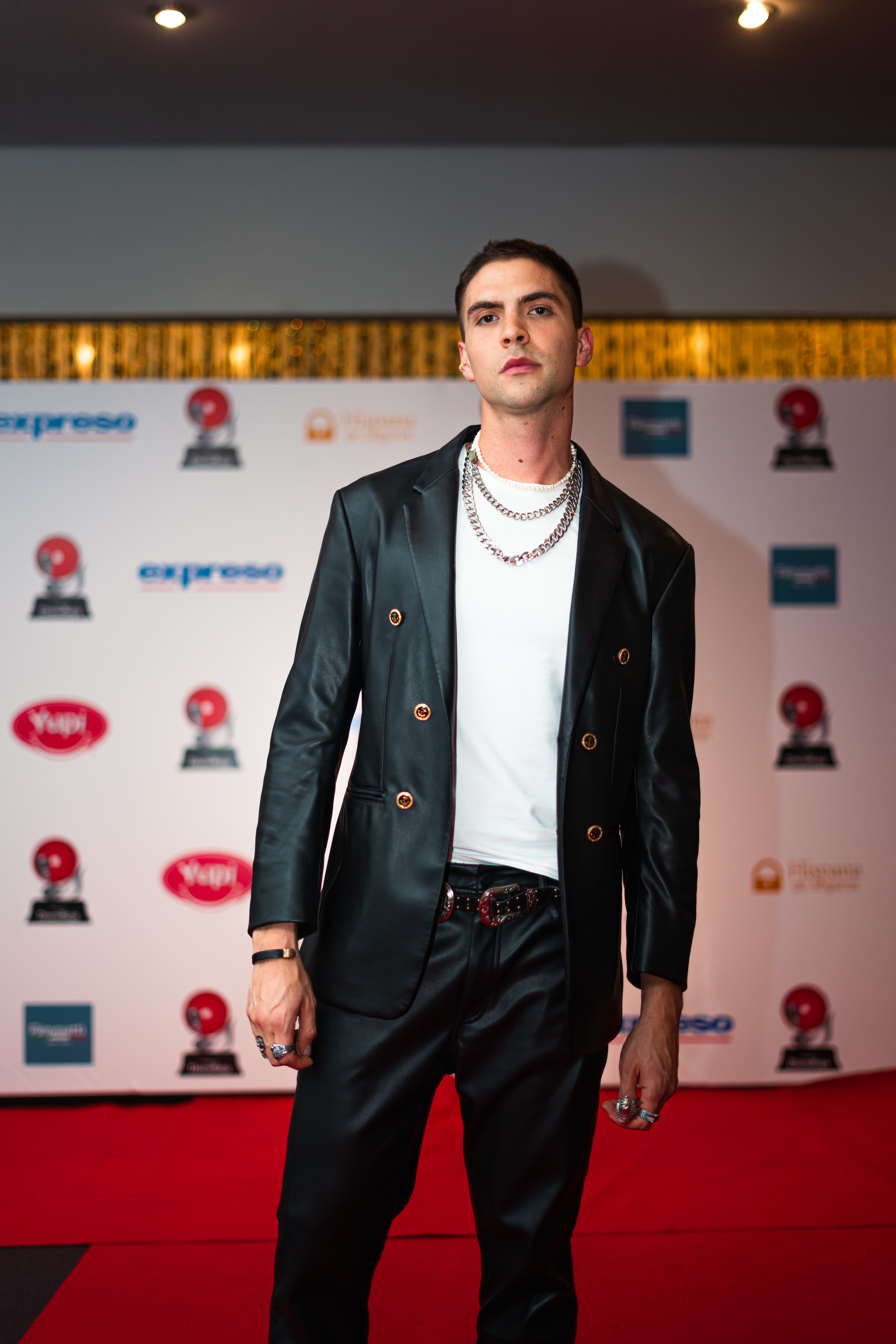
Johann Vera - Premios Disco Rojo 2022

In 2017, he released another single, this time with a more sentimental note: "Vuelo a París". The music video was recorded in New York City. That same year he released "Ojo por Ojo" on his birthday.

In 2018 he released the song "Nervioso" with the adjacent video recorded in Japan. That year he also became the first Ecuadorian artist to ever sing on an awards ceremony on the United States by releasing his single "Astronauta" on Univision's Premios Juventud.

In 2019 he followed up with "Ahogando". The music video was directed and produced by Vera himself. Being shot in various locations on the Ecuadorian coast, we can see the appearance of 2 notable Ecuadorian celebrities, Nathaly Quiñonez and Michela Pincay.

On February 13, 2020 he released "Perdón", which was the one chosen for him to sing on the Viña del Mar International Song Festival 2020, The largest Latin American Music Award. His performance awarded him a "Gaviota de Plata" (Silver Seagull) award. Later that year he released “En Donde Están”.

On 2021, Vera released “Me Tienes Mal” and “Inevitable”. The latter ended up on Ecuador's top charts for several weeks on that same year. Additionally, the music video was recorded alongside her longtime friend Pautips on their former school in Colombia. That same year, Johann finished up the taping of "Kally's Mashup ¡Un cumpleaños muy Kally!" and “Club 57”.

On 2022, Vera was inspired to create a new Ecuador inspired FIFA World Cup song that reached top charts on the country. “Donde Nací” was adopted by Ecuadorian fans as the unofficial team cheer in this year’s cup. The song has been used in thousands of TikTok and Instagram videos including some by influential Ecuadorian figures such as Guillermo Lasso. One of the most viral songs of the season.

== Discography ==
=== Singles and EPs ===
Year	Title	Notes
2016	Pretty Girl (Tu Canción)	
2016	Pretty Girl (This One's For You) [Spanglish Version]	
2016	Tiralo	
2017	Tiralo (The RNWY Remix)	
2017	Vuelo a París	
2017	Flight to Paris	
2017	Ojo por Ojo	
2018	Nervioso	
2018	Astronauta	
2019	Ahogando	
2020	Perdón	
2020	En Dónde Están?	
2021	En Dónde Están? (Acústico)	
2021	Inevitable	
2021	Inevitable (English Live Session)	
2021	Me Tienes Mal	
2022	El Profe	Song released in collaboration with Brray and Jd Patoja
2022	Donde Nací	
2024	Cielo	
2024	Closet	
2024	Maletas En Mi Cuarto	
2025	Artificial	
2025	Llorando en el Bar	
2025	Nada Importa En Verdad	
2025	Julieta y Romeo	

== Filmography ==
=== Television ===
Year	Title	Role	Notes
2007	Factor X - RCN Colombia	Contestant	Finalist
2013 - 2014	Every Witch Way - Nickelodeon	Giant John	
2014	Demente Criminal – Venevisión Internacional	Jerónimo	
2015	La Banda - Univisión	Contestant	Finalist
2020 - 2021	Club 57 (Season 2) - Nickelodeon	Nero	
2021	Master Chef Ecuador (Season 2)	Himself	Guest Appearance as Celebrity Judge
2022	Master Chef Ecuador (Season 3)	Himself	Guest Appearance as Celebrity Judge
2021	Enfermeras - RCN Colombia	Diego	
2023	Champeta: El ritmo de la tierra - Disney Plus	Michael	Lead Role
2024	Primate - Prime Video	Juan Felipe	

=== Movies ===
Year	Title	Role	Notes
2021	Kally's Mashup ¡Un cumpleaños muy Kally! - Kally's Mashup	Storm	Lead Role

== Theatre ==
Year	Title	Role	Notes
2008-2009	Oliver - MISI Colombia	Ensemble	
2010-2011	Michael Jackson Tribute - Colombia	Lead Singer	

== Awards and nominations ==
Award	Year	Category	Result
Kids Choice Awards Colombia - Nickelodeon	2017	Musical.ly (TikTok) Creator of the Year	Won
Premios Tu Mundo - Telemundo	2017	Favorite Influencer	Won
Premios Tu Mundo - Telemundo	2017	Favorite Artist of the Night	Won
Premios Disco Rojo - Radio Punto Rojo	2017	Mejor Canción Urbana - Pretty Girl	Won
Premios MBN Ecuador	2018	Mejor Artista Revelación	Won
Premios Disco Rojo - Radio Punto Rojo	2018	Mejor Canción Pop - Vuelo a Paris	Won
Premios Disco Rojo - Radio Punto Rojo	2018	Mejor Artista Masculino	Won
Viña del Mar International Song Festival	2020	Gaviota de Plata (Silver Seagull)	Won
Premios Charts Ecuador	2022	Mejor Video Musical - Donde Nací	Won
