= Love, Charlie =

Studio album by Charlie Wilson
- Released: January 25, 2013
- Length: 46:21
- Label: RCA
- Producers: Emile Ghantous; Wirlie Morris; Erik Nelson; Gregg Pagani; Optimas Pryme; Charlie Singleton; Charlie Wilson

Charlie Wilson chronology
Just Charlie (2010)	Love, Charlie (2013)	Forever Charlie (2015)

Singles from Love, Charlie
- 1. "My Love Is All I Have" Released: October 30, 2012; 2. "I Still Have You" Released: March 19, 2013

Love, Charlie is the sixth studio album by American singer Charlie Wilson. It was released on January 25, 2013 by RCA Records. The album debuted at number 4 on the US Billboard 200, and atop the Top R&B/Hip-Hop Albums, selling 44,000 copies for the week. As of January 2015, the album has sold 211,000 copies in the US.

== Critical reception ==
Professional ratings
Review scores
Source	Rating
AllMusic	3/5 stars

AllMusic editor Andy Kellman called Love, Charlie Wilson's "most modest and low-key set. Some listeners might bemoan the increasingly reserved nature of Wilson's releases since the singer's unexpected 2000s resurgence, but the direction is natural. It would make little sense for him to continue teaming with songwriters and producers accustomed to working with pop-oriented R&B artists less than half his age." Kellman cloncluded: "While it does not feature as many standouts as the three previous Charlie albums, Love, Charlie is another enjoyable and genuine addition to the catalog of a funk heavyweight."

== Track listing ==
No.	Title	Writer(s)	Producer(s)	Length
1.	"If I Believe"	Charlie Wilson; Mahin Wilson; Michael Paran; Wirlie Morris	Morris; C. Wilson	4:03
2.	"I Still Have You"	Gregg Pagani; Lance Tolbert; Edwin "Lil Eddie" Serrano; Jimmy Burney; C. Wilson; M. Wilson	Gregg Pagani; C. Wilson	4:05
3.	"I Think I'm in Love"	Emile Ghantous; Erik Nelson; C. Wilson; Dominic Andrew Gomez; M. Wilson	Ghantous; Nelson; C. Wilson	3:41
4.	"My Love is All I Have"	Morris; C. Wilson; M. Wilson; Paran	Optimas Pryme; C. Wilson	3:36
5.	"Our Anniversary"	Pagani; Tolbert; E. Serrano; C. Wilson; M. Wilson	Pagani; C. Wilson	3:53
6.	"Turn Off the Lights"	Morris; C. Wilson; M. Wilson; Paran	Optimas Pryme; C. Wilson	3:51
7.	"A Million Ways to Love You"	Pagani; Tolbert; E. Serrano; C. Wilson; M. Wilson; William Serrano	Pagani; C. Wilson	3:52
8.	"Show You"	Morris; C. Wilson; James R. Smith; Eric N. Grant; M. Wilson; Paran	Optimas Pryme; C. Wilson	3:50
9.	"My Baby"	Charlie Singleton; C. Wilson; M. Wilson; Paran	Singleton; C. Wilson	3:59
10.	"Oooh Wee"	Morris; C. Wilson; Clarice Bell-Strayhorn; Carl M. Days, Jr.; M. Wilson; Paran	Optimas Pryme; C. Wilson	3:38
11.	"Say"	Morris; C. Wilson; Smith; Grant; M. Wilson; Paran	Optimas Pryme; C. Wilson	4:07
12.	"Whisper" (featuring Keith Sweat)	Morris; C. Wilson; Dennis Bettis; Days; Clarice Bell-Strayhorn; M. Wilson; Paran	Optimas Pryme; C. Wilson	3:47
Total length:				46:21

== Personnel ==
Credits for Love, Charlie adapted from Allmusic.

- Clarice Bell-Strayhorn - Composer
- Dennis Bettis - Composer
- Jacki Brown - Grooming, Hair Stylist
- Jimmy Burney - Composer
- Josh Cheuse - Art Direction, Design
- Kamilah Chevel - Vocals (Background)
- Rob Chiarelli - Mixing
- Carl M. Days Jr. - Composer
- DJ Wayne Williams - A&R
- Emile Ghantous - Composer, Editing, Engineer, Producer, Vocal Arrangement
- Dominic Gomez - Composer, Vocal Arrangement
- Eric Grant - Composer
- Denise Hudson - Vocals (Background)
- The Insomniax - Programming
- Tom Kahre - Mixing Assistant
- Lance Tolbert - Bass, Composer, Piano, Programming
- Marlon McClain - Guitars
- Wirlie Morris - Composer, Editing, Engineer, Producer, Programming, Vocal Producer, Vocals (Background)
- Erik Nelson - Bass, Composer, Guitars, Producer, Vocal Arrangement
- Greg Pagani - Composer, Editing, Engineer, Producer, Programming
- Michael Paran - A&R, Composer, Production Coordination
- Aliesh Pierce - Grooming, Hair Stylist
- Herb Powers, Jr. - Mastering
- Brinson Poythress - Guitars
- Edwin "Lil Eddie" Serrano - Composer, Vocals (Background)
- William Serrano - Composer
- Charlie Singleton - Composer, Engineer, Producer, Vocals (Background)
- James R. Smith - Composer
- Randee St. Nicholas - Photography
- Keith Sweat - Featured Artist
- Pamela Watson - Stylist
- Charlie Wilson - Composer, Executive Producer, Primary Artist, Producer, Vocal Arrangement, Vocals, Vocals (Background)
- Mahin Wilson - A&R, Composer

== Charts ==
=== Weekly charts ===
Chart (2013)	Peak position
US Billboard 200	4
US Top R&B/Hip-Hop Albums (Billboard)	1

=== Year-end charts ===
Chart (2013)	Position
US Billboard 200	180
US Top R&B/Hip-Hop Albums (Billboard)	34
