= La Banda (American TV series) season 2 =

La Banda
- Season 2
- Hosted by: Alejandra Espinoza
- Coaches: Wisin; Laura Pausini; Mario Domm
- Winners: MIX5 (Garmandy Candelario; Christian Castro; Brian Cruz; Danelly Hoyer; Taishmara Rivera)

Release
- Original network: Univision
- Original release: September 11 – December 11, 2016

Season chronology
- ← Previous; Season 1

La Banda ("the band") is a Spanish-language singing competition series created by Ricky Martin and Simon Cowell, and produced by Ricky Martin. The goal of the series is to look for talented young teens to make the next musical phenomenon. The show was renewed for season 2, in the search for the next Latin boy and girl band. The judges in Season 2 were Wisin, Laura Pausini and Mario Domm.

Season 2 premiered on September 11, 2016, and concluded on December 11, 2016. The second season ended with a band mixed of three boys and two girls; composed of Brian Cruz (16), (Cuba), Taishmara Rivera (16), (Puerto Rico), Christian Castro (22), (Puerto Rico), Danelly Hoyer (21), (Mexico), and Garmandy Candelario (21), (Dominican Republic). The band is called MIX5.

== Participants ==
The young people listed below were voted through to the competition by at least two of the three star judges of the show. Their ages at the time of their televised audition and their Latin American countries of ethnic or national origin are also displayed.

The top 57 participants showed who passed the audition but failed to continue towards the second phase of the competition.

Top 57

Participant	Age	Origin
Abby Jim	16	Ecuador
Alleanne Marie Ponce	16	Puerto Rico
Amber Norman	14	Dominican Republic
Andi Feliu	16	Cuba
Angie Vargas	16	Mexico
Angie Vasquez	15	Peru
Anthony Cruz	18	Puerto Rico
Christian González	14	Puerto Rico
Darian Moran	17	Mexico
Gilmarie Villanueva	17	Puerto Rico
Iosvany Medina	18	Mexico
Jose Diaz	17	Mexico
Karina Tirado	15	Puerto Rico
Katherine Lopez	16	Cuba
Kenny Almanza	20	Mexico
Maria Cristina Bravo	17	Mexico
Micke Moreno	18	Colombia
Nikki Alva	14	Colombia
Sheniel Maisonet	20	Mexico
Xavier Perez	19	Puerto Rico
Yadiel Martínez	22	Puerto Rico

Top 36

Participant	Age	Origin
Alec Hernández	17	Puerto Rico
Alex Ponce	18	Mexico
Alondra Santos	14	Mexico
Andrés Melgarejo	22	Bolivia
Elaine Sanchez	16	Dominican Republic
Jesus Ulloa	14	Mexico
Jose Cadena	20	Mexico
Lianishka Rivas	18	Puerto Rico
Kimberly Garcia	21	Dominican Republic
Murckpys Nicieza	19	Cuba
Ronald Ohallorans Milanés	22	Cuba
Wendy Sarmiento	15	Cuba
Yashira Rodríguez	20	Puerto Rico

Top 24

Participant	Age	Origin
Alex La Torre	19	Mexico
Stephanie Portillo	18	Venezuela
April Vega	18	Mexico
Carolina Schott	15	Dominican Republic
Gabriel Carrero	19	Puerto Rico
Jeidimar Rijos	16	Puerto Rico
Jorge Cruz	15	Puerto Rico
Kevin Sánchez	22	Puerto Rico

Top 16

Participant	Age	Origin
Abdiel Larralde	20	Cuba
Abel Margo	16	Mexico
Aimee Miranda	16	Ecuador
Alondra Martínez	15	Puerto Rico
Brian Cruz	15	Cuba
Christian Castro	22	Puerto Rico
Edward Baeza	17	Mexico
Danelly Hoyer	21	Mexico
Fabyan Sánchez	19	Puerto Rico
Felix Gabriel	22	Puerto Rico
Garmandy Candelario	21	Dominican Republic
Megamy Bowles	21	Bolivia
Sofía Delfino	16	Venezuela
Taishmara Rivera	15	Puerto Rico
Verónica Rodríguez	16	Puerto Rico
Zhamira Zambrano	18	Venezuela

The final 5 that won the competition were Brian Cruz, Taishmara Rivera, Christian Castro, Danelly Hoyer and Garmandy Candelario.

== Results ==
=== Results summary ===
Contestants' color key:

– Contestant announced as safe in no particular order.
– No eliminations for that week for those particular contestants.
– Contestant in the bottom three and was saved by the public vote.
– Contestant in the bottom four and was saved by the public vote.
– Contestant in the bottom three and was eliminated.
– Last contestant to be saved and was chosen by the three judges.
– A winning contestant of La Banda.

Note: The eliminations are based on the previous weeks' performances and the viewers' votes each week.

Contestant	November 6	November 13	November 20	November 27	December 4	December 11
Brian Cruz	N/A	Fans' Save (2nd)	Safe	Safe	Safe	1st Member
Taishmara Rivera	Fans' Save (1st)	N/A	Safe	Safe	Safe	2nd Member
Christian Castro	N/A	Safe	Safe	Safe	Safe	3rd Member
Danelly Hoyer	Safe	N/A	Saved live by fans	Safe	Judges' Save	4th Member
Garmandy Candelario	N/A	Safe	Safe	Safe	Safe	5th Member
Fabyán Sánchez	N/A	Safe	Safe	Safe	Safe	Eliminated
Félix Gabriel	N/A	Fans' Save (1st)	Safe	Safe	Saved live by fans	Eliminated
Megamy Bowles	Safe	N/A	Judges' Save	Judges' Save	Safe	Eliminated
Zhamira Zambrano	Safe	N/A	Safe	Safe	Saved live by fans	Eliminated
Alondra Martínez	Safe	N/A	Safe	Saved live by fans	Safe	Eliminated
Abel Margo	N/A	Judges' Save	Safe	Safe	Eliminated	Eliminated
Verónica Rodríguez	Fans' Save (2nd)	N/A	Safe	Eliminated (2nd)	Eliminated	Eliminated
Abdiel Larralde	N/A	Safe	Safe	Eliminated (1st)	Eliminated	Eliminated
Sofia Delfino	Judges' Save	N/A	Eliminated	Eliminated	Eliminated	Eliminated
Edward Baeza	N/A	Eliminated	Eliminated	Eliminated	Eliminated	Eliminated
Aimee Miranda	Eliminated	Eliminated	Eliminated	Eliminated	Eliminated	Eliminated

=== October 30 – Female Live Show. ===
The first live show was the girls from the top 16. They all performed solo songs as well as two group performances. The best group is safe, and the other risks elimination. In the second live show, the first band from last week confirmed that Taishmara and Veronica were saved by the fans. Sofia was saved by the judges, and Aimee was the first finalist eliminated.

Order of performance	Song	Performed by
1	"La Bicicleta" (Shakira & Carlos Vives)	Top 16
2	"Dueles" (Jesse y Joy)	Sofia Delfino
3	"Shower" (Becky G)	Aimee Miranda
4	"Conmigo" (Sofia Reyes)	Taishmara Rivera
5	"Aire" (Leslie Grace ft Maluma)	Veronica Rodriguez
6	"Just Like Fire" (Pink)	Band #1 Sofia, Aimee, Taishmara, Veronica
7	"Casi Nada" (Karol G)	Zhamira Zabrano
8	"Super Bass" (Nicki Minaj)	Danelly Hoyer
9	"No" (Meghan Trainor)	Alondra Martinez
10	"Vuélveme a Querer" (Thalia)	Megamy Bowles
11	"On the Floor" (Jennifer Lopez ft Pitbull)	Band #2 Zhamira, Danelly, Alondra, Megamy

Live show 1 (Female)
Contestant	Group	Result
Aimee Miranda	1	Eliminated
Sofia Delfino	1	Safe
Taishmara Rivera	1	Safe
Veronica Rodriguez	1	Safe
Zhamira Zabrano	2	Safe
Danelly Hoyer	2	Safe
Alondra Martinez	2	Safe
Megamy Bowles	2	Safe

=== November 6 – Male Live Show. ===
The second live show was the boys from the top 16. They all performed solo songs as well as two group performances. The best group gets immunity, and the other needs the fans to vote for them in order to avoid elimination. On November 13, 2016, it was confirmed that Brian and Felix were saved by the fans. Abel was saved by the judges, and Edward was the second finalist eliminated.

Order of performance	Song	Performed by
1	"Cheap Thrills" (Sia, Nicky Jam, & Big Sean)	Top 16
2	"Nunca me olvides" (Yandel)	Brian Cruz
3	"See You Again" (Wiz Khalifa & Charlie Puth)	Felix Gabriel
4	"Decidiste Dejarme" (Camila)	Edward Baeza
5	"Treat You Better" (Shawn Mendes)	Abel Margo
6	"Otra Vez" (Zion & Lennox ft. J Balvin)	Band #1 Brian, Felix, Edward, Abel
7	Eres una Nina (Gerardo Ortiz)	Garmandy Candelario
8	Ya Me Entere (Reik & Nicky Jam)	Fabyan Sanchez
9	La Carretera (Prince Royce)	Abdiel Larralde
10	"Cold Water" (Major Lazer & Justin Bieber)	Christian Castro
11	De Pies a Cabeza	Band #2 Garmandy, Fabyan, Abdiel, Christian

Live show 2 (Male)
Contestant	Group	Result
Brian Cruz	1	Safe
Felix Gabriel	1	Safe
Edward Baeza	1	Eliminated
Abel Margo	1	Safe
Garmandy Candelario	2	Safe
Fabyan Sanchez	2	Safe
Abdiel Larralde	2	Safe
Christian Castro	2	Safe

=== November 13 – Girls VS Boys. ===
At the end of the group presentations, the public votes saved Felix and Brian, and then the judges chose Abel to stay. So therefore, Edward was eliminated.

Group	Members
1	Garmandy, Christian, Edward, Brian
2	Alondra, Zhamira, Sofia
3	Abel, Abdiel, Felix, Fabyan
4	Megamy, Danelly, Veronica, Taishmara

=== November 20 – Mixed groups. ===
In the bottom three, fans were able to vote through the Univision Connecta app for their favorite live. Danelly was saved by public vote, then the judges chose Megamy to stay. So therefore, Sofia was eliminated. CNCO came to perform their hit, Reggaeton Lento.

Group	Members
1	Alondra, Veronica, Felix
2	Sofia, Abel, Garmandy
3	Taishmara, Danelly, Christian, Brian
4	Megamy, Zhamira, Fabyan, Abdiel

=== November 27 – Quarterfinal ===
It was announced the previous week that 2 contestants will be eliminated. In the fifth live show, after the group presentations, it was revealed that Abdiel was the first of the two finalists eliminated. Alondra, Megamy, and Veronica were at risk of elimination. The public vote saved Alondra, and the judges chose Megamy to stay. So therefore, Veronica was the second finalist eliminated.

Group	Members
1	Abel, Taishmara, Zhamira
2	Brian, Garmandy, Alondra, Veronica
3	Felix, Christian, Megamy
4	Danelly, Fabyan, Abdiel

=== December 4 – Semifinal ===
This time, they would announce the eliminated contestant after the opening of the show. Abel, Felix, Zhamira, and Danelly were risk of elimination. The public votes saved both Zhamira and Felix. Then the judges choose Danelly, and so therefore, Abel was next finalist eliminated. The ten remaining contestants presented a solo performance following Abel's elimination.

Order of performance	Song	Performed by
1	""	Top 11
2	"Baddest Girl in Town"	Fabyan Sanchez
3	"Quedate con Ella"	Megamy Bowles
4	"Entre Tu y Mil Mares"	Felix Gabriel
5	"Closer"	Alondra Martinez
6	"Safari"	Garmandy Candelario
7	"Let Me Love You"	Taishmara Rivera
8	"Dangerous Woman"	Zhamira Zambrano
9	"Nunca te Olvidare"	Brian Cruz
10	"Hasta el Amanecer"	Danelly Hoyer
11	"One Dance"	Christian Castro

=== December 11 – The Finals ===
The Winners were announced the public vote chose Brian Cruz and Taishmara Rivera as the two most voted contestants making them the first two members to join the band. Then the judges chose the next two members which were Christian Castro and Danelly Hoyer. The final member was chosen by the public which was Garmandy Candelario. The band's named was announced as Mix5.
