= Tino Coury =

American businessman

Robertino Coury
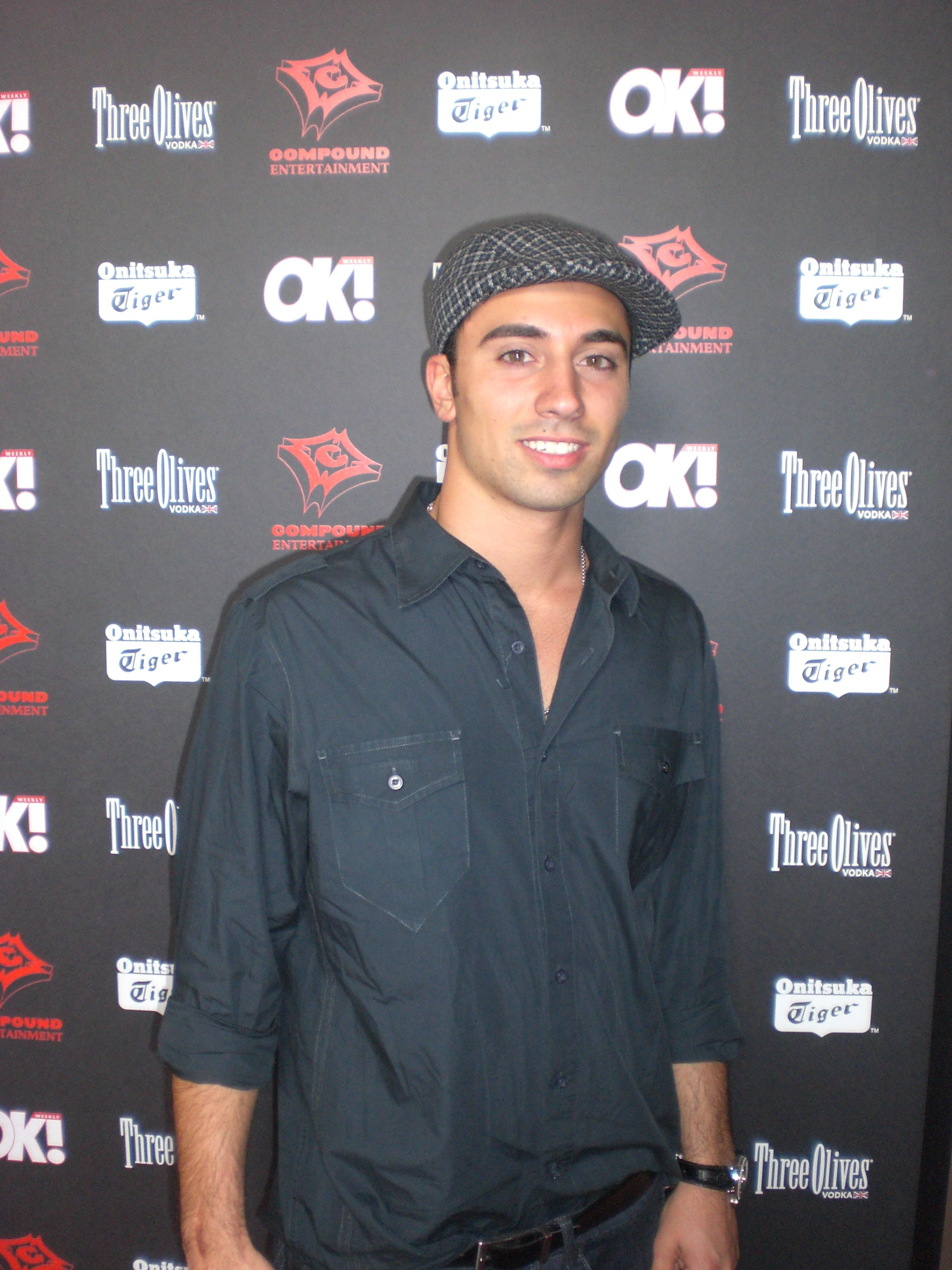
- Coury at Ne-yo's EMI Party

Background information
- Also known as: Tino Coury
- Born: August 17, 1988 (age 36)
- Origin: Pittsburgh, Pennsylvania, U.S.
- Occupation(s): President and member of the Board of Directors of The Coury Firm and ÉO Management, Singer-songwriter, Eleventh Records
- Website: www.tinocoury.com

Robertino Coury is the American President and member of the Board of Directors of The Coury Firm and ÉO Management. He is also the Treasurer and member of the Board of Directors for The Robert J. Coury Family Foundation. As owner of Eleventh Records, and as a singer songwriter under the name Tino Coury he had a number of hits, with his song "Diary" charted on Top 40 radios and on Billboard Hot Dance Club Songs.

== Business ==
The Coury Firm, founded in 1984 by Robert J. Coury, and headquartered in Pittsburgh, PA and with offices in Los Angeles, CA, works with prominent individuals, families and their family offices, businesses, and institutional clients to help them define, implement, and protect their financial and investment objectives. Robertino also serves as the Co-Chief Investment Officer of Coury Firm Asset Management LLC, where he focuses on designing and implementing algorithmic trading programs focused on macro investing and rooted in quantitative finance.

In addition to his role at Coury, Robertino serves as President and Chairman of the Investment Committee for ÉO Management. To fulfill the family’s objective of giving back, The Robert J. Coury Family Foundation was formed in 2014 where Robertino Coury serves on the Board of Directors. The foundation’s mission is to support efforts to expand the opportunity and educational experience for young, motivated, and passionate individuals around the world, aiding to enhance their knowledge base with guiding principles that can be applied to their professional careers.

== Music ==
Prior to joining Coury, Robertino co-founded Eleventh Records, an independent music label, where as a producer and songwriter he launched a single in 2010 as Tino Coury. His follow-up was "Up Against The Wall" from EP Page One and "Drink My Love Away" from his 2012 debut album This One's For. Collaborations on the album included Da Internz, Sham & Motesart, Kadis & Sean and Mansur and songwriters Redd Stylez, Jackie Boyz, Lil Eddie, and Marlin "Hookman" Bonds.

== Discography ==
=== Albums ===
- 2012: This One's For

=== EPs ===
- 2011: Page One EP

=== Singles ===
Year	Single	Peak positions	Album
Year	Single	US Dance	Album
2010	"Diary"	11	Page One
2010	"Up Against the Wall"	–	Page One
2012	"Drink My Love Away"	–	This One's For

=== Music videos ===
Year	Song	Director
2010	"Diary"	Roman White

== In popular culture ==
- "Diary" music was featured on soundtrack of the game Tap Tap Revenge 3.
