= In It to Win It (Charlie Wilson album) =

Studio album by Charlie Wilson
- Released: February 17, 2017
- Length: 49:51
- Label: RCA
- Producers: Charlie Wilson; Emile Ghantous; Keith Hetrick; Steve Daly; Gregg Pagani; Lance Tolbert; Damon Sharpe; J. R. Rotem

Charlie Wilson chronology
Forever Charlie (2015)	In It to Win It (2017)

Singles from In It to Win It
- 1. "I'm Blessed" Released: December 16, 2016; 2. "Good Time" Released: May 26, 2017

In It to Win It is the eighth studio album by American R&B singer-songwriter Charlie Wilson. It was released on February 17, 2017, by RCA Records. The album includes collaborations with Snoop Dogg, Lalah Hathaway, Wiz Khalifa, T.I., Robin Thicke and Pitbull.

== Critical reception ==
Professional ratings
Review scores
Source	Rating
AllMusic	3/5 stars

AllMusic reviewer Andy Kellman found that "the material on In It to Win It mostly sticks to an "If it ain't broke, don't fix it" approach that has brought the singer commercial and Grammy-nominated success for well over a decade. Wilson continues to offer traditional, uplifting R&B that sounds modern and mature without pandering to younger or older audiences. He simply stocks the album with affectionate, gracious love songs and breaks them up with the occasional upbeat funk track or contemporary gospel number – nothing fancy." Melody Charles, writing for SoulTracks wrote: "Gap-Band-recalling up-tempos, rapper cameos, and inspirational bits of testimony in-between: if life were a religion, this In It to Win It chapter from The Book of Charlie is proof that faith and works, paired with God's grace, will make beautiful music out of the madness of life."

== Commercial performance ==
In It to Win It debuted at number seven on the Billboard 200 with 48,000 album-equivalent units, of which 47,000 were pure album sales.

== Track listing ==
In It to Win It track listing
No.	Title	Writer(s)	Producer(s)	Length
1.	"I'm Blessed" (featuring T.I.)	Charlie Wilson; Emile Ghantous; Keith Hetrick; Steve Daly; Mahin Wilson; Michael Paran; Clifford Harris	C. Wilson; Ghantous; Hetrick; Daly	4:04
2.	"Chills"	C. Wilson; Gregg Pagani; Lance Tolbert; Edwin Parrano; M. Wilson; Michael Paran	C. Wilson; Pagani; Tolbert^{[a]}	3:45
3.	"Good Time" (featuring Pitbull)	C. Wilson; Ghantous; Keith Hetrick; Daly; Damon Sharpe; M. Wilson; Paran; Armando C. Perez	C. Wilson; Ghantous; Hetrick; Daly; Sharpe	3:36
4.	"Us Trust" (featuring Wiz Khalifa)	C. Wilson; Rob Knox; Eric Hudson; Bryan Jackson; M. Wilson; Paran; Cameron Thomaz	Knox; Hudson; Bryan J^{[b]}	4:17
5.	"Precious Love"	C. Wilson; Ghantous; Keith Hetrick; Tyler Conti; M. Wilson; Paran	C. Wilson; Ghantous; Hetrick	3:23
6.	"Smile for Me" (featuring Robin Thicke)	C. Wilson; Pagani; Carlos Battey; M. Wilson; Paran	C. Wilson; Pagani	3:18
7.	"In It to Win It"	C. Wilson; Pagani; Battey; M. Wilson; Paran	C. Wilson; Pagani	4:05
8.	"Dance Tonight"	C. Wilson; Knox; Hudson; Jackson; M. Wilson; Paran	Knox; Hudson; Bryan J^{[b]}	3:14
9.	"Made for Love" (featuring Lalah Hathaway)	C. Wilson; Wirlie Morris; C. Bell-Strayhorn; M. Wilson; Paran	C. Wilson; Morris	4:15
10.	"Better"	C. Wilson; Knox; Hudson; Jackson; M. Wilson; Paran	Knox; Hudson; Bryan J^{[b]}	4:01
11.	"Gold Rush" (featuring Snoop Dogg)	C. Wilson; Knox; Hudson; Jackson; M. Wilson; Paran; Daryl Camper; Calvin Broadus	Knox; Hudson; Bryan J^{[b]}	3:44
12.	"New Addiction"	C. Wilson; Jonathan Reuven Rotem; John Newman; Andrew Jackson	J. R. Rotem	2:55
13.	"Amazing God"	C. Wilson; Morris; C. Bell-Strayhorn; M. Wilson; Paran	C. Wilson; Morris	5:18
Total length:				49:51

Notes

- ^a signifies co-producer
- ^b signifies a vocal producer

== Charts ==
=== Weekly ===
Weekly chart performance for In It to Win It
Chart (2017)	Peak position
US Billboard 200	7
US Top R&B/Hip-Hop Albums (Billboard)	6

=== Year-end ===
Year-end chart performance for In It to Win It
Chart (2017)	Rank
US Top R&B/Hip-Hop Albums (Billboard)	100

== Release history ==
Release history and formats for In It to Win It
Region	Date	Format(s)	Label	Ref
United States	February 17, 2017	CD; digital download	RCA	
