= La Banda (American TV series) season 1 =

La Banda
- Season 1
- Hosted by: Alejandra Espinoza
- Coaches: Ricky Martin; Laura Pausini; Alejandro Sanz
- Winners: CNCO (Christopher Vélez; Joel Pimentel; Erick Brian Colón; Richard Camacho; Zabdiel de Jesús)

Release
- Original network: Univision
- Original release: September 13 – December 13, 2015

Season chronology
- Next → Season 2

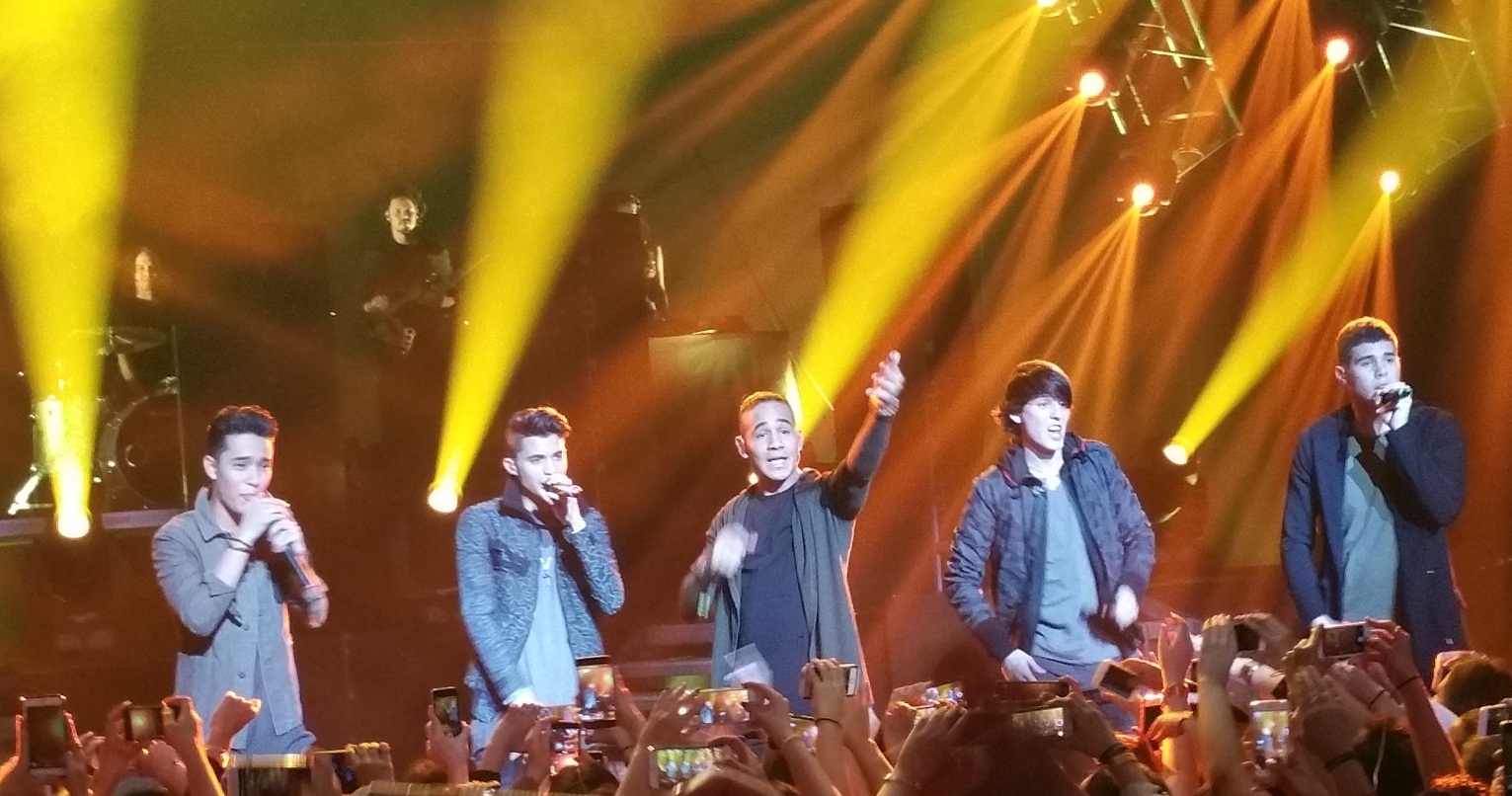
CNCO, Season 1 winners debut concert, January 30, 2016, The Fillmore Miami Beach. L-R: Joel Pimentel Deleōn (Mexican-American), Erick Brian Colón (Cuban), Richard Camacho (Dominican-American), Christopher Vélez (Ecuadorian-American), Zabdiel De Jesus (Puerto Rican).

La Banda ("the band") is a Spanish-language singing competition series created by Ricky Martin and Simon Cowell, and produced by Ricky Martin. It is presented by Alejandra Espinoza and premiered on September 13, 2015. The judges in Season 1 were Ricky Martin, Laura Pausini, and Alejandro Sanz. The goal of the series is to look for talented young teens to make the next musical phenomenon. The show was renewed for season 2.

Auditions for the inaugurative season were held in Los Angeles, Miami, Chicago, Houston, New York and also in Puerto Rico. Season 1 premiered on September 13, 2015, and ended on December 13, 2015. The new band entitled CNCO is composed of (current ages): Christopher Vélez (24), (Ecuador), Richard Camacho (23), (Dominican Republic), Joel Pimentel (21), (Mexico), Erick Brian Colon (19), (Cuba), and Zabdiel de Jesús (22), (Puerto Rico).

== Participants ==
The young men listed below were voted through to the competition by at least two of the three star judges of the show. Their ages at the time of their televised audition and their Latin American countries of ethnic or national origin are also displayed.

The top 41 participants showed who passed the audition but failed to continue towards the second phase of the competition. The judges decided to form four five-member boy bands to perform during this phase. The fifth five-member boy band was to be made up of five of the participants left behind. After performing, the judges sent all but five boys home. The top 20 shows the participants who moved on to the third round but failed to continue on after that.

Top 41

Participant	Age	Origin
Yashua Camacho	16	Dominican Republic
Franco Tortolani	17	Venezuela
Ezequiel Cárdenas; Jeremías Cárdenas	20	Mexico / Spain
Adán Allende	24	Puerto Rico
Ricardo Moreno	16	Mexico
Anthony Ortiz	17	United States
Luis Gamarra	22	Bolivia
Diydan López	21	Mexico
Cristhian Camacho	17	Colombia
Jorge Gabriel Rodríguez	21	Cuba
Jordan Hernańdez	18	Mexico
José López Cepero	17	Puerto Rico
Mateo Urrea	16	Colombia
José Barrientos	19	Mexico
Mauricio Novoa	18	Mexico
Fabyan Sánchez	18	Puerto Rico
Brian Gallardo	19	Mexico
Garmandy Candelario	20	Dominican Republic
Joseph Picorelli	16	Puerto Rico
Felix Gabriel	21	Puerto Rico

Each boy band performed its cover of a song in a music video. After watching the videos, the judges eliminate five more contestants.

Top 20

Participant	Age	Origin
Micke Moreno	17	Colombia
Jason Medina	18	Mexico
Elison Joel Morban	18	Dominican Republic
José Tunon	16	Mexico
Matthews Charlotten	18	Puerto Rico

Top 15

The judges had the top 15 participants performing as a solo artist. The fans are in charge of whose performance was their most favorite.

Participant	Age	Origin
José Antonio Monroig	17	Puerto Rico
Nickie Jon Pabon	19	Puerto Rico
Kevin González **	20	El Salvador

- Kevin González was originally part of the top 12, but for unknown reasons, Gonzalez decided to quit from the competition. During the first live show it was revealed that Alan Matheus would replace Gonzalez.

Top 12

Here the 12 finalists that will fight for their goal in the final phase of the competition.

Participant	Age	Origin
Aarón Bodden	18	Honduras
Christopher Vélez	20	Ecuador
Joshua Greaux	17	Puerto Rico
Zabdiel de Jesús	18	Puerto Rico
Joel Pimentel	16	Mexico
Johann Vera	20	Ecuador
Erick Brian Colón	14	Cuba
Yoandri Cabrera	16	Cuba
Jaime Cruz	15	Puerto Rico
Sebastián Rivera	15	Puerto Rico
Alan Matheus **	14	Venezuela
Richard Camacho	19	Dominican Republic

The final 5 that won the competition were Joel Pimentel, Erick Brian Colón, Richard Camacho, Zabdiel de Jesús, and Christopher Vélez

== Results ==
=== Results summary ===
Contestants' color key:

– Contestant announced as safe in no particular order.
– Contestant in the bottom three and was saved by the judges.
– Contestant in the bottom three and was saved by the public vote.
– Contestant in the bottom three and was eliminated.
– Winning contestants who join La Banda.

Note: No eliminations occurred during the Week 1 of the live shows, due to the fact that the contestants needed to obtain votes in order for elimination to occur the following week.
Note: On week seven the judges could not decide who would be the fourth member so the public live votes chose Erick Brian Colon.

Contestant	Week 2	Week 3	Week 4	Week 5	Week 6	Week 7	La Banda
Christopher Velez	Safe	Safe	Safe	Safe	Safe	Safe	1st Member
Richard Camacho	Safe	Safe	Safe	Safe	Safe	Safe	2nd Member
Joel Pimentel	Safe	Safe	Safe	Safe	Bottom three	Safe	3rd Member
Erick Brian Colón	Safe	Safe	Safe	Safe	Safe	Safe	4th Member
Zabdiel de Jesús	Safe	Safe	Safe	Bottom three	Safe	Bottom three	5th Member
Yoandri Cabrera	Safe	Bottom three	Bottom three	Safe	Bottom three	Bottom three	Eliminated (Week 7)
Jaime Cruz	Bottom three	Bottom three	Safe	Bottom three	Safe	Bottom three	Eliminated (Week 7)
Johann Vera	Safe	Safe	Safe	Safe	Bottom three	Eliminated (Week 6)	
Aaron Bodden	Safe	Safe	Bottom three	Bottom three	Eliminated (Week 5)		
Alan Matheus	Safe	Safe	Bottom three	Eliminated (Week 4)			
Sebastián Rivera	Bottom three	Bottom three	Eliminated (Week 3)				
Joshua Greaux	Bottom three	Eliminated (Week 2)					
Judges voted to Save
Alejandro's vote	Sebastián Rivera	Jaime Cruz	Alan Matheus	Zabdiel de Jesus	Yoandri Cabrera	Yoandri Cabrera	
Laura's vote	Joshua Greaux	Sebastián Rivera	Aaron Bodden	Zabdiel de Jesus	Yoandri Cabrera	Erick Brian Colón	
Ricky's vote	Sebastián Rivera	Jaime Cruz	Aaron Bodden	Zabdiel de Jesus	Johann Vera	Zabdiel De Jesús	

=== Live show details ===
Ricky Martin saved Erick Brian Colon.

==== Week 1 (November 1) ====
- Group performance: "La Gozadera"

Band performances
Band	Order	Song(s)	
Band #1: Aaron Boden; Richard Camacho; Zabdiel de Jesus; Johann Vera	1	"Fun"	
Band #2: Christopher Velez; Joel Pimentel; Sebastian Rivera; Erick Brian Colon	2	"El Perdón"	
Band #3: Jaime Cruz; Yoandri Cabrera; Alan Matheus; Joshua Greaux	3	"Drag Me Down"	
Individual performances
Contestant	Order	Song(s)	Result
Richard Camacho	4	"Sunset"	Safe
Zabdiel de Jesus	5	"A Thousand Years"	Safe
Erick Brian Colon	6	"La Temperatura"	Safe
Aaron Bodden	7	"Que Viva la Vida"	Safe
Jaime Cruz	8	"Stitches"	Bottom 3
Alan Matheus	9	"Darte un Beso"	Safe
Sebastian Rivera	10	"Isn't She Lovely"	Bottom 3
Joshua Greaux	11	"Duele el Amor"	Eliminated
Johann Vera	12	"Impossible"	Safe
Christopher Velez	13	"Contigo"	Safe
Yoandri Cabrera	14	"Fight Song"	Safe
Joel Pimentel	15	"I See Fire"	Safe

==== Week 2 (November 8) ====
Band performances
Band	Order	Song(s)	
Band #1: Yoandri Cabrera; Richard Camacho; Sebastian Rivera; Joel Pimentel	1	"Cheerleader"	
Band #2: Christopher Velez; Alan Matheus; Aaron Bodden; Erick Brian Colon	2	"Me Voy Enamorando"	
Band #3: Jaime Cruz; Johann Vera; Joshua Greaux; Zabdiel de Jesus	3	"Uptown Funk"	
Individual performances
Contestant	Order	Song(s)	Result
Johann Vera	4	"Vivir Mi Vida"	Safe
Aaron Bodden	5	"Back It Up"	Safe
Zabdiel de Jesus	6	"Ginza"	Safe
Yoandri Cabrera	7	"Noviembre Sin Ti"	Bottom 3
Christopher Velez	8	"Steal My Girl"	Safe
Erick Brian Colon	9	"Cuando Me Enamoro"	Safe
Sebastian Rivera	10	"¡Corre!"	Eliminated
Alan Matheus	11	"Me Enamora"	Safe
Jaime Cruz	12	"Héroe"	Bottom 3
Richard Camacho	13	"Marvin Gaye"	Safe
Joel Pimentel	14	"Dreaming of You"	Safe

==== Week 3 (November 15) ====
Band performances
Band	Order	Song(s)	
Band #1: Zabdiel de Jesus; Richard Camacho; Alan Matheus; Erick Brian Colon	1	"Algo Me Gusta de Ti"	
Band #2: Christopher Velez; Yoandri Cabrera; Joel Pimentel; Jaime Cruz	2	"Sígueme y Te Sigo"	
Band #3: Johann Vera; Sebastian Rivera; Aaron Bodden	3	"Rain Over Me"	
Individual performances
Contestant	Order	Song(s)	Result
Zabdiel de Jesus	4	"Volví a Nacer"	Safe
Aaron Bodden	5	"Get Lucky"	Bottom 3
Alan Matheus	6	"Looking for Paradise"	Eliminated
Johann Vera	7	"Disparo al Corazón"	Safe
Joel Pimentel	8	"Stand By Me"	Safe
Yoandri Cabrera	9	"Viva la Vida"	Bottom 3
Christopher Velez	10	"Víveme"	Safe
Jaime Cruz	11	"Danza Kuduro"	Safe
Erick Brian Colon	12	"Calentura"	Safe
Richard Camacho	13	"Propuesta Indecente"	Safe

==== Week 4 (November 22) ====
- Musical guests: Gente de Zona ft. Marc Anthony – "Traidora" and Becky G – "Break a Sweat"

Band performances
Band	Order	Song(s)	
Band #1: Richard Camacho; Zabdiel de Jesus; Aaron Bodden; Alan Matheus; Johann Vera	1	"Tú Me Quemas"	
Band #2: Christopher Velez; Erick Brian Colon; Joel Pimentel; Jaime Cruz; Yoandri Cabrera	2	"What Do You Mean?"	
Individual performances
Contestant	Order	Song(s)	Result
Jaime Cruz	3	"La Mordidita"	Bottom 3
Yoandri Cabrera	4	"Mi Peor Error"	Safe
Richard Camacho	5	"Am I Wrong"	Safe
Johann Vera	6	"El Amor de Su Vida"	Safe
Aaron Bodden	7	"Pierdo La Cabeza"	Eliminated
Joel Pimentel	8	"Photograph"	Safe
Zabdiel de Jesus	9	"Coleccionista de Canciones"	Bottom 3
Erick Brian Colon	10	"Ay Vamos"	Safe
Christopher Velez	11	"Fuiste Tú"	Safe

==== Week 5 (November 29) ====
- Musical guests: Jesse y Joy – "Ecos de Amor" and Calibre 50 – "Contigo"

Band performances
Band	Order	Song(s)	
Band #1: Christopher Velez; Jaime Cruz; Joel Pimentel; Johann Vera; Richard Camacho	1	"Nota de Amor" / "Bailar Contigo"	
Band #2: Aaron Bodden; Erick Brian Colon; Yoandri Cabrera; Zabdiel de Jesus	2	"Locked Away" / "Rude"	
Individual performances
Contestant	Order	Song(s)	Result
Christopher Velez	3	"Odio"	Safe
Joel Pimentel	4	"Espacio Sideral"	Bottom 3
Jaime Cruz	5	"No Sales de Mi Mente"	Safe
Richard Camacho	6	"Lay Me Down"	Safe
Zabdiel de Jesus	7	"Aunque Ahora Estes con El"	Safe
Johann Vera	8	"Miedo"	Eliminated
Yoandri Cabrera	9	"One Last Time"	Bottom 3
Erick Brian Colon	10	"Hablé de Ti" / "Don't You Worry Child"	Safe

==== Week 6: Semi-final (December 6) ====
- Musical guests: Reik – "Voy a Olvidarte" / "Inolvidable" and Luis Coronel – "Nada Mas por Eso"

Band performances
Band	Order	Song(s)	
Band #1: Joel Pimentel; Erick Brian Colon; Zabdiel de Jesus; Yoandri Cabrera	1	"Que Se Sienta El Deseo"	
Band #2: Christopher Velez; Jaime Cruz; Johann Vera; Richard Camacho	2	"I Gotta Feeling"	
Individual performances
Contestant	Order	Song(s)	Result
Joel Pimentel	3	"Bendita tu luz"	3rd
Johann Vera (Note: In week 6, the results of the week 5's votes were announced at the end of the episode, allowing all 8 contestants to perform individually before Johann Vera's elimination.)	4	"Levels"	—N/a
Erick Brian Colon	5	"Tranquila"	4th
Yoandri Cabrera	6	"El Próximo Viernes"	Bottom 3
Jaime Cruz	7	"Vaivén"	Bottom 3
Christopher Velez	8	"Kilómetros"	1st
Richard Camacho	9	"Sorry"	2nd
Zabdiel de Jesus	10	"Salomé"	Bottom 3 (5th member)
