= Radio Killer =

Romanian dance music group

- Damixie in studio

Background information
- Origin: Bucharest, Romania
- Genres: Popcorn; dance-pop
- Years active: 2009–2015, 2026 - present
- Label: Roton
- Members: Paul Damixie; Lee Heart

Radio Killer was a Romanian dance-pop and Eurodance music group. Their debut single was released in 2009 and is called "Voila". It was the most broadcast song in Romania and Russia of that year. The name "Radio Killer" comes from the fact that "radio killer" means "hit" in US slang; Radio Killer intended all its songs to be hits.

They have had songs chart in countries including Germany, Italy, Spain, England, France, Russia, Slovenia, Greece, and Switzerland and even got a first place in the UK charts and won an award for "Best New Act" in the 2010 Romanian Music Awards. Their single "Calling You" was the first song by a Romanian DJ project to be in the BBC Radio 1 playlist. Their song "Is It Love Out There" is the official anthem for the Liberty Parade, the biggest street dance event in Romania.

Paul Damixie (born on 12 September, 1988), the group's DJ, has won the Remix Award in Miami for his remix of Adele's "Hello" in March 2016.

== Members ==
- Smiley
- EleFunk
- Paul Damixie
- Crocodealer
- DJ CellBlock
- Karie
- Boogie Man
- Lee Heart

== Discography ==
Singles

- Voila, 2009
- Be Free, 2010
- Lonely Heart, 2010
- Don't Let the Music End, 2011
- Calling You, 2012
- Is It Love Out There, 2012
- You and Me, 2012
- Middle of the Night, 2013
- Raise Me Up, 2013
- Beautiful People, 2013
- Perfect Day, 2013
- Kill the Lights, 2014
- Living It Up, 2014
- It Hurts Like Hell, 2015

=== Popular singles ===
List of singles, with selected chart positions
Title	Year	Peak chart positions	Album
Title	Year	ROM	Album
"Voila"	2009	—	Voila
"Be Free"	2010	—	Be Free
"Lonely Heart"	2011	—	Lonely Heart

== See also ==
- List of music released by Romanian artists that has charted in major music markets
