= Champeta, el ritmo de la Tierra =

2025 Colombian television series

- Genre: Comedy drama; Fantasy; Musical
- Written by: Andrés Gelós; Pablo Junovich; Santiago Guerty
- Directed by: Riccardo Gabrielli R.
- Composer: Mr Black El Presidente
- Country of origin: Colombia
- Original language: Spanish
- No. of seasons: 2
- No. of episodes: 18

Production
- Production locations: Bogotá; Cartagena de Indias; Santa Marta; Ciénaga
- Cinematography: Julian Torres
- Running time: 40 minutes
- Production companies: Vista Productions, Inc.

Original release
- Network: Disney Channel Latin America
- Release: 3 February – 14 May 2025

Champeta, el ritmo de la Tierra (English: Champeta, The Rhythm of the Earth) is a Colombian comedy-drama television series for children and adolescents, which is produced by Vista Productions for The Walt Disney Company. In Latin America, the series became a Disney Channel original series, which premiered on February 3, 2025.

== Plot ==
Fatimah and Duma come from two completely different worlds. Near the Colombian Caribbean coast, the two young people fall in love while dancing Champeta together in the streets of Barrio de la Bahía. Not far away also lives Elías, an enigmatic elderly man who knows about the mysterious power emanating from the rhythm of the local champetas. Chosen by this ancient power of the earth, Fatimah and Duma receive supernatural powers which they awaken when their feet touch the ground to the rhythm of the champeta. This power was given to the two to save the earth from a powerful and ruthless corporation that not only harms the environment, but also threatens the lives of all beings. Together with their friends and allies, Fatimah and Duma develop their skills and fight together for the preservation of Barrio de la Bahía and the whole of the earth.

== Cast ==
- Daniela Trujillo as Fatimah Vallejos
- Keyller de la Hoz as Duma
- Marlon Moreno as Elías
  - Manuel Alvarez Parra as Simón / Younger Elías.
- Bárbara Perea as Alma
- Mr Black El Presidente as Chamo Bialetti
- Angely Gaviria as Luz
- Johann Vera as Michael Hurtado
- Sergio Herrera as Alexander Osuna
- Allison Vega as Majo
- Danharry Colorado as Ronnie
- Blanca Palacio as Vera Osuna
- Julián Calderón as Pipa
- Jean Carlo Posada as Don Orlando
- Sebastian González as Emiliano
- Rafael Novoa as Eduardo
- James Vargas as old Man
- Cristian Vargas as Pedro
- Ricardo Vélez as César Osorio
- Carolina Angarita as Verónica

== Episodes ==
No. overall	No. in season	Title	Directed by	Written by	Original release date
1	1	"El llamado de la tierra"	Unknown	Unknown	3 February 2025
2	2	"Predestinados"	Unknown	Unknown	4 February 2025
3	3	"El tiempo está de nuestro lado"	Unknown	Unknown	5 February 2025
4	4	"Perdidas en el olvido"	Unknown	Unknown	6 February 2025
5	5	"Tú"	Unknown	Unknown	7 February 2025
6	6	"La sombra"	Unknown	Unknown	10 February 2025
7	7	"Yelenkes"	Unknown	Unknown	11 February 2025
8	8	"El dolor de la tierra"	Unknown	Unknown	12 February 2025
9	9	"Las dos caras del mal"	Unknown	Unknown	13 February 2025
10	10	"Con o sin tí"	Unknown	Unknown	14 February 2025
