= Madison McWilliams =

American pop singer and songwriter

- Born: Austin, TX
- Genre: Pop
- Occupations: Singer, songwriter
- Instrument: Piano
- Years active: 2012–present
- Website: https://www.madisonmcwilliams.com

Madison McWilliams is an American pop singer and songwriter best known for the songs "Melodramatic" and "Living for the Weekend".

== Early life and education ==
Madison McWilliams was born and raised in Austin, TX. She began singing and playing piano at a young age, then performing Italian opera and in musical theatre throughout her school years. At age 11, she trained with the Broadway Artists Alliance program under Tony Award-winning instructors in New York City. Shortly after, she connected with Asleep at the Wheel's Ray Benson and began writing her own music. In 2017, she began attending online high school to focus on her music career.

She cites Aretha Franklin, The Beatles, Michael Jackson, and Donny Hathaway as her influences. She is also currently attending Harvard University.

== Career ==
In 2014, McWilliams began writing and recording pop music in Nashville with producer Rob Hawkins. Her cover of Nina Simone's "Feeling Good" garnered over 1 million views on social media the following year. In July 2015, she released her debut EP The Beginning, along with three music videos. The following year, she released her debut single "Smell the Roses" and a cover of "The Christmas Song (Chestnuts Roasting on an Open Fire)". In 2017, she released her self-titled debut EP which included six tracks: "We've Got Today", "Fighter", "Melodramatic", "End of the Tunnel", "Easy", and "Burn and Crash". In 2018, she released the single "Melodramatic" from her EP, which premiered on Vevo, and the music video garnered over 125,000 views on YouTube. She also released the single "Living for the Weekend" in July 2018. The music video was directed by Scott Rice and choreographed by Tina Landon. which was featured on EXTRA News and Girls’ Life. Landon stated of McWilliams: "There are very few artists I've worked with in my career who are so on-point with all the ideas they have. Along with the work ethic, she really has the whole package." In October 2018, the music video aired in Foot Locker stores across the US. Her music combines the pop, pop rock, jazz, R&B, and blues genres.

She has performed several times live at South by Southwest in Austin, TX in March 2017 and at Make-A-Wish World Wish Day in San Antonio, TX in April 2017. In September 2017, she performed on Voice of America with Larry London and sang the National Anthem for the Staten Island Yankees. She also performed the national anthem at the NASCAR Xfinity Series race at Texas Motor Speedway in Fort Worth, TX in November 2017. and at the MotoGP Red Bull Grand Prix at Circuit of Americas in Austin, Texas in 2019. In July 2018, Waterloo Records hosted a CD signing for her EP and she performed on the Boys of Summer tour. Over the years, she has also opened at the Hill Country Galleria in Austin, Texas for Plain White Tees, EchoSmith and Andy Grammer.

McWilliams was named as Artist of the Month by Austin Monthly in July 2017, as an IHeartRadio and KIIS-FM NextUp Artist of the Week in May 2018, and as an artist in the KTLA Artist Spotlight. Her single "We've Got Today" was featured in Musical.ly's NextWave April 2017 video competition for which she was named as one of 15 emerging artists internationally. She has received praise for her "dreamy vocals" and "catchy songs". Girls' Life named Madison 2018's IT GIRL . Legendary songwriter, Billy Steinberg, recognized Madison "One To Watch" in his 2019 interview with Live Nation. This year, she was the recipient of the "Blazing Star Award" from the Women's Chamber of Commerce of Texas.

She is an official Make-A-Wish ambassador for Texas, and wrote her song "Fighter" as a tribute to the Make-A-Wish Children. She headlined Make A Wish's World Wish Day in 2017 , Macy's BELIEVE Campaign and Annual Wish Night in 2018, the latter of which raised over $1 million. She is also the official spokesperson for the Art of Kindness campaign, which is partnered with Lady Gaga's Born This Way Foundation. A Travis County election clerk at just 15, Madison headlined a 2018 West Coast tour with The Headcount and AwesomenessTV to empower her fans by preregistering high school students to vote. In 2019, she partnered with Teen Vogue to support the publication's Sweet 16 Bash hosted by Teen Vogue’s Editor in Chief, Linsday Peoples Wagner.

== Discography ==
Year	Title	Label	Notes
2016	"Smell the Roses"	Independent	Single
2016	"The Christmas Song (Chestnuts Roasting on an Open Fire)"	Independent	Single
2017	Madison	Independent	EP
2017	"Fighter"	Independent	Single
2018	"Living for the Weekend"	Independent	Single
