= Steve Powers =

American journalist (born 1934)

Steve Powers (born February 25, 1934) is a musician, journalist and teacher who has had a 45-year career in New York City radio and television, as well as academia.

== Education ==
Born and Bar Mitzvahed in the Bronx, New York City, on February 25, 1934, Powers attended the City College of New York where he became editor of Roundhouse Magazine. In 1956 he received a degree in Business Administration from CCNY. Powers attended the University of Virginia where he worked at the student radio station, WUVA. He was a member of the UVA Jazz Club, which integrated the university auditorium with a concert by Dizzy Gillespie. Mr. Gillespie invited Powers to sit in. It was an experience that was repeated thirty years later when he played another concert with Gillespie at New York's Blue Note club. In 1987 Powers earned a PhD from New York University in Neil Postman's Media Ecology program.

== Journalism career ==
After graduating from CCNY in 1956, and serving as a Search and Rescue officer in the United States Coast Guard in Puerto Rico, Powers returned to the New York area and started looking for work as a jazz disc jockey. He was hired by radio station WADS, in Ansonia, Connecticut, in 1961 as a newscaster. He subsequently worked as a newscaster and news director for several radio stations in Connecticut. In 1963 he anchored the coverage of the assassination of John F. Kennedy on WICC for 13 straight hours.

Powers moved to WMCA radio in New York City and went on to anchor his own morning drive-time news/talk show. He left WMCA in 1972 to become a correspondent at ABC radio network news and worked at RKO radio network news.

In 1980, Powers became an anchor/reporter on television at WNYW-TV, NY (Fox-TV) where he worked for 12 years. He was the first reporter to cover John Lennon's death on December 8, 1980, broadcasting the first network radio reports while assisting with WNYW-TV's television coverage of the story. From 1980 until December 1992, he was the anchor/reporter for WNYW-TV Channel 5 News, where he was awarded an Emmy Award in 1981; in 1986 he was also nominated for an Emmy for an Outstanding Feature story. In later years, Powers was the anchor of noon-6:00 P.M.newscasts for New York Times Radio, and the writer/producer/voice of the "Health Times" medical reports on WQXR-FM, NY. He signed off for the last time from New York Times radio] in June 2007.

In addition to his work in radio and television, Powers served as a college professor in the field of media communications. From 1976 to 1993 Powers periodically taught as an adjunct professor at the Columbia School of Journalism, The New School, and New York University. In 1993, he became an associate professor at St. John's University teaching journalism and media.

Powers has also lent his voice narrating Aaron Copland's Lincoln Portrait in concert and has appeared in diverse commercials and documentaries. He has appeared in the films "In The Spirit" and "Home Free All.

== Books authored ==
In 1992 Powers co-authored the book How to Watch TV News with media theory pioneer Neil Postman. The book is an explication of the difference between what TV news says it is presenting and what it actually delivers - "real news" versus entertainment fodder - illuminating the biases, strengths, and weaknesses of TV news as well as the influence of commercials. It has been adopted by college professors and teachers as required reading for their journalism and media literacy courses. In the year following his retirement from broadcasting, Powers released a new, updated edition of the book (Penguin Books, June 23, 2008). This newly revised edition explores the power of the Internet and the abundance of cable channels and their influences on the devolving quality of America’s television news programming. Less than five months later, the book's second chapter, "What is News," resurfaced in the textbook, Key Readings in Media Today (Routledge, November 18, 2008), where it serves as the opening chapter in the section on electronic media.

== Music career ==
In addition to the Gillespie concerts, Powers had a career as a professional musician. He taught himself Latin percussion and played with Willie Rodriguez, Charlie Palmieri and Randy Carlos as well as playing drums with Tony Bennett, Joe Jones, and David Amram. Powers was a co-inventor of a drum that can change its pitch while being played, receiving a patent in 1987.

== Personal life ==
Powers currently lives in New Mexico with his wife, Sheri Powers. He has four adult children from a previous marriage; Lisa, Marisa, Laura and Anthony Powers.

== Professional honors and awards ==
- 1970 Clio Award, Broadcast Radio Promo, WMCA RAdio, New York.
- 1978 "Partner in Education" Award from the City of New York, benefitting students of the New York City public schools". WMCA Radio New York.
- 1981-1982 New York Emmy Award, reporter and segments producer, contributing to outstanding news broadcast for the 10 o'clock News, WNEW-TV.
- 1981 New York Press Club Byline Award, WNEW-TV. TV News Reporting on a Breaking Story, the death of legendary Broadway Producer, Gower Champion.
- April 16, 1982. UPI New York City Broadcast Nomination, Best Enterprise TV Awards News Reporting for the entry, New Jersey "Boarding Homes Scandal". WNEW-TV.
- May 26, 1986, Nomination for "Outstanding Single News Feature" as Producer/Reporter called "Pig Races", WNYW/5 New York.
