= Cody Simpson discography =

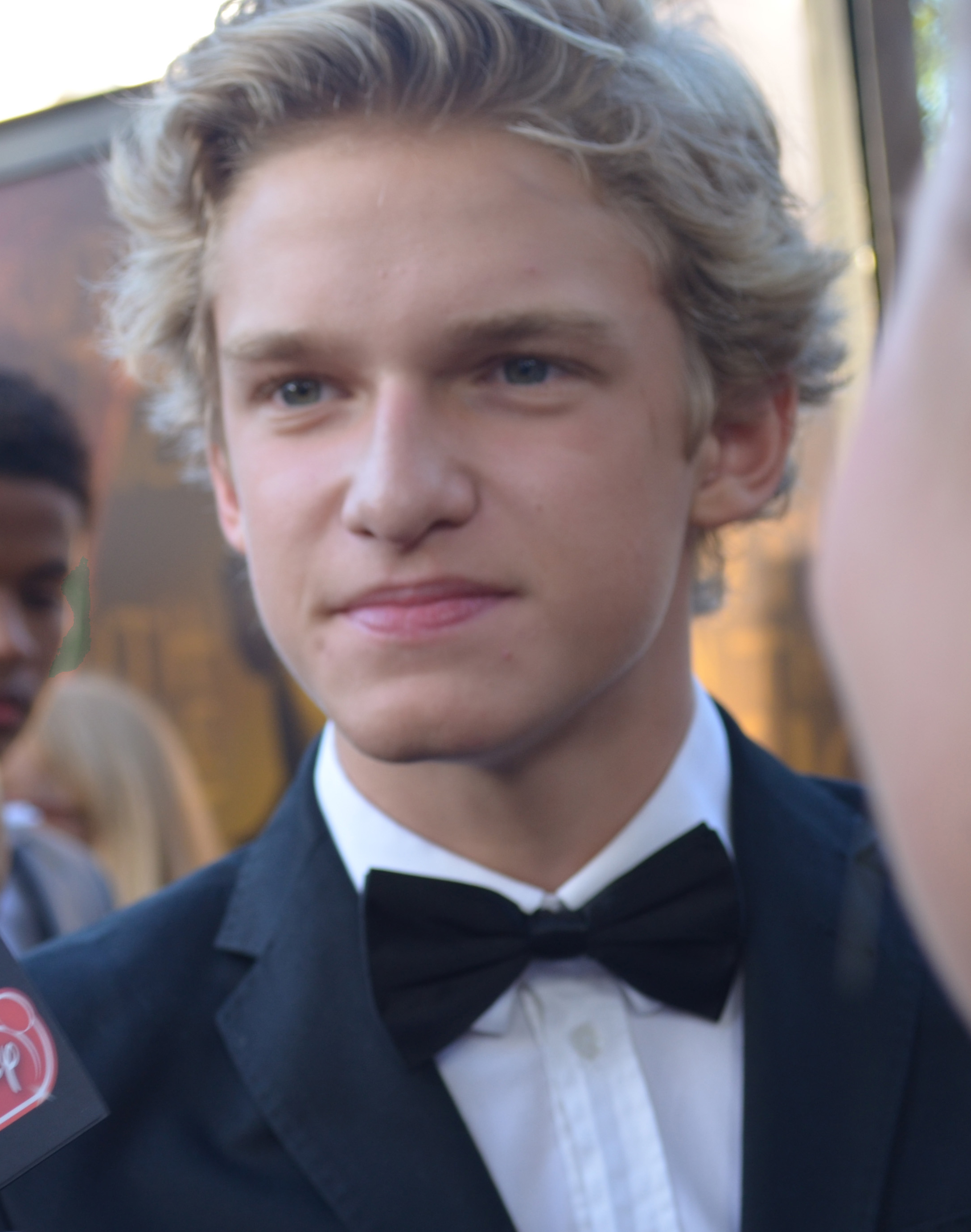
- Simpson at the Hollywood premiere of Disney Channel's Let It Shine in 2012
- Studio albums: 4
- Extended plays: 9
- Singles: 24
- Music videos: 17
- Mixtapes: 1
- Promotional singles: 5

Australian singer Cody Simpson has released four studio albums, nine extended plays, one mixtape, twenty four singles (including one as a featured artist), five promotional singles and seventeen music videos. Simpson released his debut extended play, 4 U, on 21 December 2010 under Atlantic Records, preceded by the lead single "iYiYi", which peaked at number 73 on the Canadian Hot 100. The album spawned a second single, "All Day", which peaked at number 79 on the Canadian Hot 100.

Simpson released the first single from the album, "On My Mind", on 23 April 2011. Shortly afterwards, he confirmed the title of his debut album to be Coast to Coast. The second single, "Not Just You" was released on 16 September 2011, "Angel" was released on 16 December 2011. In April 2012, Simpson released the mixtape Angels & Gentlemen while waiting to release his first full-studio album Paradise.

== Albums ==
=== Studio albums ===
List of studio albums, with selected chart positions
Title	Album details	Peak chart positions									
Title	Album details	AUS	BEL (FL)	CAN	DEN	FRA	IRE	NOR	SPA	UK	US
Paradise	Released: 2 October 2012; Label: Atlantic; Format: CD, digital download	31	40	16	—	157	53	—	81	—	27
Surfers Paradise	Released: 16 July 2013; Label: Atlantic; Format: CD, digital download	25	38	2	30	130	29	20	—	30	10
Free	Released: 10 July 2015; Label: Bananabeat, Coast House; Format: CD, digital download	74	82	23	—	—	—	—	—	—	128
Cody Simpson	Released: 8 April 2022; Label: Coast House; Format: Digital download, streaming	—	—	—	—	—	—	—	—	—	—
"—" denotes a recording that did not chart or was not released in that territory.

=== Compilation albums ===
Title	Album details
B-Sides	Released: 24 May 2019; Label: Coast House; Format: Digital download

=== Mixtapes ===
Title	Album details
Angels & Gentlemen	Released: 28 April 2012; Label: Atlantic; Format: Digital download

== Extended plays ==
List of extended plays, with selected chart positions
Title	EP details	Peak chart positions		
Title	EP details	AUS	US	US Heat
4 U	Released: 21 December 2010; Label: Atlantic; Format: CD, Digital download	—	—	4
Coast to Coast	Released: 20 September 2011; Label: Atlantic; Format: CD, digital download	16	12	1
Preview to Paradise	Released: 12 June 2012; Label: Atlantic; Format: Digital download	—	—	—
The Acoustic Sessions	Released: 19 November 2013; Label: Atlantic; Format: CD, digital download; Track listing: 1. "Pretty Brown Eyes (Acoustic)"; 2. "All Day (Acoustic)"; 3. "La Da Dee (Acoustic)"; 4. "Please Come Home for Christmas (Acoustic)"	—	118	—
Wave One	Released: 29 September 2017; Label: Entertainment One Music; Format: Digital download, streaming; Track listing: 1. "Waiting for the Tide"; 2. "Sun Go Down"; 3. "Tell Me Why"; 4. "Ramona"	—	—	—
Wave Two	Released: 3 August 2018 – 8 February 2019; Label: Entertainment One; Format: Digital download, streaming; Track listing: 1. "Underwater"; 2. "Don't Let Me Go"; 3. "Daybreak"; 4. "Way Way"; 5. "Underwater (Midi Jones Remix)"; 6. "Daybreak (Acoustic)"; 7. "Don't Let Me Go(Reef Mix)"	—	—	—
B-Sides	Released: 3 August–21 November 2018; Label: Cody Simpson; Format: Digital download; Track listing: 1. "Pirates Dream"; 2. "It's Always You"; 3. "I Fall in Love Too Easily"; 4. "New Crowned King"	—	—	—
B-Sides: We Had	Released: 22 February 2019; Label: Cody Simpson; Format: Digital download, streaming; Track listing: 1. "We Had"; 2. "No Longer Blue"; 3. "Dear Marie, I'd Love to Meet Your Mum"; 4. "Temple"	—	—	—
B-Sides: Part the Seas	Released: 15 March 2019; Label: Coast House; Format: Digital download, streaming; Track listing: 1. "Part the Sea"; 2. "Siren Song"; 3. "That's What Love Is All About"; 4. "Palm of Your Hand"	—	—	—
Prince Neptune: Singles & Rarities	Released: 13 August 2021; Label: Coast House; Format: Digital download, streaming	—	—	—

== Singles ==
=== As lead artist ===
List of singles as lead artist, with selected chart positions and certifications, showing year released and album name
Title	Year	Peak chart positions									Certifications	Album
Title	Year	AUS	BEL (FL)	CAN	IRE	JPN	NZ	UK	US Pop	US Bub.	Certifications	Album
"iYiYi" (featuring Flo Rida)	2010	19	— (Note: "iYiYi" did not enter the Ultratop 50, but peaked at number 33 on the Flemish Ultratip chart.)	73	—	61	29	—	—	12	ARIA: Gold; MC: Gold	4 U
"All Day"	2011	97	19	79	—	—	—	—	—	22	MC: Gold	4 U
"On My Mind"	2011	51	—	79	—	5	—	—	39	—	MC: Gold	Coast to Coast
"Not Just You"	2011	—	—	—	—	—	—	—	—	—		Coast to Coast
"Angel"	2011	—	—	—	—	—	—	—	—	—		Coast to Coast
"Got Me Good"	2012	—	—	—	—	—	—	—	—	—		Paradise
"Wish U Were Here" (featuring Becky G)	2012	—	— (Note: "Wish U Were Here" did not enter the Ultratop 50, but peaked at number 10 on the Flemish Ultratip chart.)	—	99	—	—	—	—	—		Paradise
"Pretty Brown Eyes"	2013	90	—	61	75	—	—	61	33	8	MC: Gold; RIAA: Gold; RMNZ: Gold	Surfers Paradise
"Summertime of Our Lives"	2013	—	—	—	—	—	—	—	—	—		Surfers Paradise
"La Da Dee"	2013	77	—	89	—	—	—	—	—	—	RIAA: Gold; RMNZ: Gold	Surfers Paradise
"Love" (featuring Ziggy Marley)	2014	—	—	—	—	—	—	—	—	—		Surfers Paradise
"Surfboard"	2014	97	—	65	—	—	—	99	—	—		Non-album single
"Home to Mama" (with Justin Bieber)	2015	—	—	—	—	—	—	—	—	—		Purpose (Japanese Edition)
"Flower"	2015	—	—	—	—	—	—	—	—	—		Free
"New Problems"	2015	—	—	—	—	—	—	—	—	—		Free
"White Christmas"	2017	—	—	—	—	—	—	—	—	—		Non-album single
"Tell Me Why"	2017	—	—	—	—	—	—	—	—	—		Wave One
"Underwater"	2018	—	—	—	—	—	—	—	—	—		Wave Two
"Don't Let Me Go"	2018	—	—	—	—	—	—	—	—	—		Wave Two
"Please Come Home for Christmas"	2019	—	—	—	—	—	—	—	—	—		Non-album singles
"Golden Thing"	2019	—	—	—	—	—	— (Note: "Golden Thing" did not enter the NZ Top 40 Singles Chart, but peaked at number 18 on the NZ Hot Singles Chart.)	—	—	—		Non-album singles
"Captain's Dance with the Devil"	2020	—	—	—	—	—	—	—	—	—		Prince Neptune: Singles & Rarities
"Hoochie Coochie Man" (featuring North Mississippi AllStars)	2020	—	—	—	—	—	—	—	—	—		Non-album singles
"High Forever" (featuring Nairobi)	2020	—	—	—	—	—	—	—	—	—		Non-album singles
"Christmas Dreaming"	2020	—	—	—	—	—	—	—	—	—		Non-album singles
"Nice to Meet You"	2022	—	—	—	—	—	—	—	—	—		Cody Simpson
"Let Go"	2022	—	—	—	—	—	—	—	—	—		Cody Simpson
"On My Mind (Forever Version)"	2024	—	—	—	—	—	—	—	—	—		Non-album singles
"Fly"	2024	—	—	—	—	—	—	—	—	—		Non-album singles
"Baby Blue"	2026	— (Note: "Baby Blue" did not enter the ARIA top 100, but peaked at number 13 on the Australian Artist chart.)	—	—	—	—	— (Note: "Baby Blue" did not enter the NZ Top 40 Singles Chart, but peaked at number 15 on the NZ Hot Singles Chart.)	—	—	—		TBA
"When It Comes to Loving You"	2026	—	—	—	—	—	—	—	—	—		TBA
"Fluent"	2026	—	—	—	—	—	—	—	—	—		TBA
"—" denotes a recording that did not chart or was not released in that territory.

=== As featured artist ===
List of singles as featured artist, with selected chart positions, showing year released and album name
Title	Year	Peak chart positions	Album
Title	Year	CAN	Album
"They Don't Know About Us" (Victoria Duffield featuring Cody Simpson)	2012	74	Shut Up and Dance
"When the Lights Go Down" (Galantis and DVBBS featuring Cody Simpson)	2022	—	Non-album single
"—" denotes a recording that did not chart or was not released in that territory.

=== Promotional singles ===
List of promotional singles, with selected chart positions, showing year released and album name
Title	Year	Peak chart positions	Album
Title	Year	JPN	Album
"Summertime"	2010	77	—N/a
"I Want Candy"	2011	—	Hop
"Love"	2011	—	—N/a
"So Listen" (featuring T-Pain)	2012	—	Preview to Paradise
"No Ceiling"	2014	—	Surfers Paradise
"Livin' Easy"	2015	—	Free
"Happy Lil' Hippie"	2015	—	Free
"—" denotes a recording that did not chart or was not released in that territory.

== Guest appearances ==
Title	Year	Other artist(s)	Album
"Make It Hot (Shot for Me Reimagined)"	2011	Jessica Jarrell	—N/a
"Inescapable"	2012	Jessica Jarrell	Glow

== Soundtracks ==
Title	Year	Film/Album
"I Want Candy"	2011	Hop
"Shine Supernova"	2013	Escape from Planet Earth
"La Da Dee"	2013	Cloudy with a Chance of Meatballs 2
