= Paradise Tour (Cody Simpson) =

2013–14 concert tour by Cody Simpson

- Tour by Cody Simpson
- Associated album: Surfers Paradise; The Acoustic Sessions
- Start date: 30 May 2013
- End date: 31 January 2014
- Legs: 2
- No. of shows: 48 in North America

Cody Simpson concert chronology
- Welcome to Paradise Tour (2012); Paradise Tour (2012–13); The Acoustic Sessions Tour (2014)

The Paradise Tour was Cody Simpson's 2013–2014 tour.

== Opening acts ==
- Ryan Beatty (30 May-20 July 2013)
- Before You Exit (30 May-20 July 2013, select shows)
- Plug in Stereo (10-31 January 2014)

== Setlist ==
The following songs were performed at 4 June 2013 concert at Club Nokia in Los Angeles. It does not represent all shows during the tour

1. "Be the One"
2. "Paradise"
3. "La Da Dee"
4. "No Ceiling"
5. "Wish U Were Here"
6. "Awake All Night"
7. "Hallelujah"
8. "Summertime of Our Lives"
9. "Good as It Gets"
10. "Round of Applause"
11. "On My Mind"
12. "All Day"
13. "Angel"
14. "Summer Shade"
15. "Gentleman"
16. "Don't Cry Your Heart Out"
17. "Love"
18. "Back to You"
19. "Not Just You"
20. "Tears On Your Pillow"
21. "Got Me Good"
22. "If You Left Him For Me"
23. "Pretty Brown Eyes"

Encore

24. "Be the One"
25. "iYiYi"

== Tour dates ==
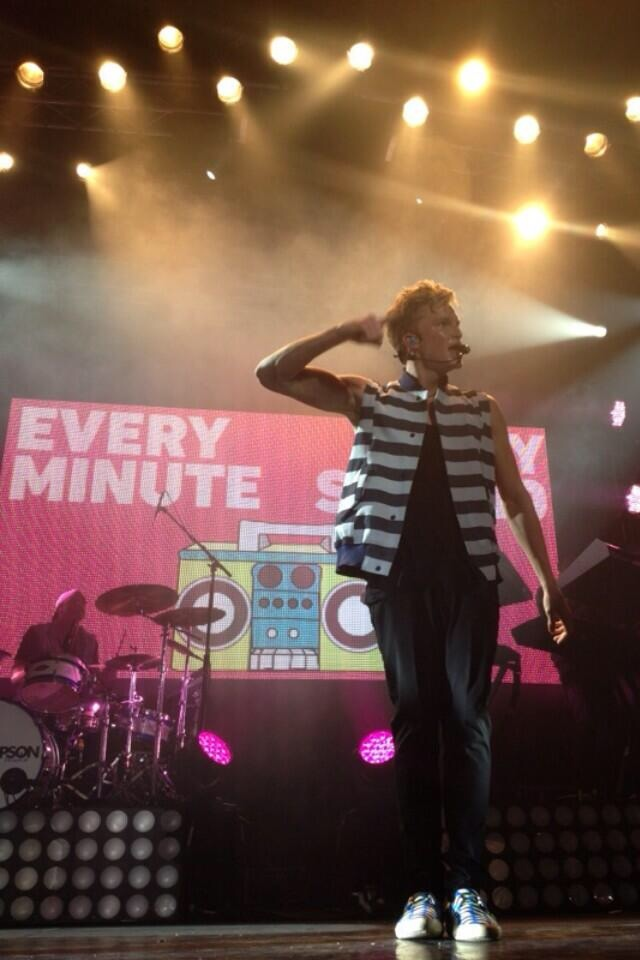
Simpson performing at the DAR Constitution Hall, 14 July 2013

Date	City	Country	Venue
North America
30 May 2013	Jacksonville	United States	Moran Theater
31 May 2013	Tampa	United States	Morsani Hall
1 June 2013^{[A]}	Panama City Beach	United States	Aaron Bessant Park Amphitheater
2 June 2013	Birmingham	United States	BJCC Concert Hall
4 June 2013	Atlanta	United States	Cobb Energy Performing Arts Centre
6 June 2013	Houston	United States	Bayou Music Center
7 June 2013	Dallas	United States	South Side Ballroom
8 June 2013	San Antonio	United States	Lila Cockrell Theatre
9 June 2013	El Paso	United States	Plaza Theatre
12 June 2013	Phoenix	United States	Celebrity Theatre
14 June 2013	Los Angeles	United States	Club Nokia
19 June 2013	Fresno	United States	Saroyan Theatre
20 June 2013	San Francisco	United States	Warfield Theatre
21 June 2013	Sacramento	United States	Community Center Theater
22 June 2013	Portland	United States	Roseland Theater
23 June 2013	Seattle	United States	Paramount Theatre
24 June 2013	Vancouver	Canada	Orpheum Theatre
27 June 2013	Calgary	Canada	MacEwan Conference & Event Centre
28 June 2013	Edmonton	Canada	Northern Alberta Jubilee Auditorium
30 June 2013	Winnipeg	Canada	Cummings Theatre for the Performing Arts
2 July 2013	Minneapolis	United States	Mill City Nights
3 July 2013^{[B]}	Milwaukee	United States	BMO Harris Pavilion
5 July 2013	Rosemont	United States	Rosemont Theatre
8 July 2013	Toronto	Canada	Massey Hall
10 July 2013	Montreal	Canada	Métropolis
12 July 2013	Upper Darby Township	United States	Tower Theater
13 July 2013	Munhall	United States	Carnegie Library Music Hall
14 July 2013	Washington, D.C.	United States	DAR Constitution Hall
17 July 2013	New Brunswick	United States	State Theatre
18 July 2013	New York City	United States	Best Buy Theater
20 July 2013	Boston	United States	House of Blues
10 January 2014	Santa Ana	United States	Constellation Room
11 January 2014	Los Angeles	United States	El Rey Theatre
15 January 2014	Detroit	United States	Saint Andrew's Hall
16 January 2014	Toronto	Canada	Virgin Mobile Mod Club
17 January 2014	Toronto	Canada	Virgin Mobile Mod Club
18 January 2014	Montreal	Canada	Virgin Mobile Corona Club
19 January 2014	Philadelphia	United States	Prince Music Theater
20 January 2014	Cambridge	United States	The Sinclair
21 January 2014	New York City	United States	Highline Ballroom
22 January 2014	Washington, D.C.	United States	The Hamilton
24 January 2014	Atlanta	United States	Loft at Center Stage Theater
25 January 2014	Birmingham	United States	WorkPlay Theatre
26 January 2014	Nashville	United States	Mercy Lounge
28 January 2014	Indianapolis	United States	Deluxe at Old National Centre
29 January 2014	Chicago	United States	Lincoln Hall
30 January 2014	St. Louis	United States	Firebird
31 January 2014	Denver	United States	Marquis Theatre

Festivals and other miscellaneous performances
^{A} Real.Fun.BeachFest
^{B} Summerfest

Cancellations and rescheduled shows

13 June 2013	Tucson, Arizona	Rialto Theatre	Cancelled
16 June 2013	Las Vegas	The Joint	Cancelled
2 July 2013	Minneapolis, Minnesota	State Theatre	Moved to Mill City Nights
23 July 2013	Royal Oak, Michigan	Royal Oak Music Theatre	Cancelled
24 July 2013	St. Louis	Peabody Opera House	Cancelled
25 July 2013	Kansas City, Missouri	The Midland by AMC	Cancelled
26 July 2013	Wichita, Kansas	Cotillion Ballroom	Cancelled
27 July 2013	Denver	Ogden Theatre	Cancelled
