= Dancing with the Stars (American TV series) season 18 =

Dancing with the Stars
- Season 18
- Promotional poster, featuring former pro dancer Anna Trebunskaya
- Hosted by: Tom Bergeron; Erin Andrews
- Judges: Carrie Ann Inaba; Len Goodman; Bruno Tonioli
- Celebrity winner: Meryl Davis
- Professional winner: Maksim Chmerkovskiy
- No. of episodes: 12

Release
- Original network: ABC
- Original release: March 17 – May 20, 2014

Season chronology
- ← Previous; Season 17 Next → Season 19

Season eighteen of Dancing with the Stars premiered on March 17, 2014, on the ABC network.

On May 20, 2014, Olympic ice dancer Meryl Davis and Maksim Chmerkovskiy were crowned the champions, while snowboarder Amy Purdy and Derek Hough finished in second place, and actress Candace Cameron Bure and Mark Ballas finished in third.

This season was also first to feature a new twist called "The Switch Up", which gave viewers the opportunity to vote and change up the celebrity/professional pairings for a week during the season. Each celebrity was required to perform with a new pro for one week.

== Cast ==
=== Couples ===
This season featured twelve celebrity contestants. The cast and their professional partners were revealed on March 4, 2014, on Good Morning America. Sasha Farber returned to the dance troupe, while Witney Carson and Henry Byalikov were elevated to professional status, and Maksim Chmerkovskiy also returned following a two-season hiatus. Jenna Johnson, who competed on season ten of So You Think You Can Dance, and Artem Chigvintsev, who was a professional on the British Strictly Come Dancing, joined the dance troupe.

Celebrity	Notability	Professional partner	Status
Diana Nyad	Long-distance swimmer	Henry Byalikov	Eliminated 1st on March 24, 2014
Sean Avery	NHL player	Karina Smirnoff	Eliminated 2nd on March 24, 2014
Billy Dee Williams	Movie actor	Emma Slater	Withdrew on March 31, 2014
Cody Simpson	Singer-songwriter	Witney Carson; Sharna Burgess (Week 4)	Eliminated 3rd on April 14, 2014
Drew Carey	Television host, actor & comedian	Cheryl Burke; Witney Carson (Week 4)	Eliminated 4th on April 21, 2014
NeNe Leakes	Reality television personality & actress	Tony Dovolani; Derek Hough (Week 4)	Eliminated 5th on April 28, 2014
Danica McKellar	The Wonder Years actress & author	Valentin Chmerkovskiy; Maksim Chmerkovskiy (Week 4)	Eliminated 6th on May 5, 2014
Charlie White	Olympic ice dancer	Sharna Burgess; Peta Murgatroyd (Week 4)	Eliminated 7th on May 12, 2014
James Maslow	Big Time Rush singer & actor	Peta Murgatroyd; Cheryl Burke (Week 4)	Eliminated 8th on May 19, 2014
Candace Cameron Bure	Full House actress & author	Mark Ballas; Tony Dovolani (Week 4)	Third place on May 20, 2014
Amy Purdy	Paralympic snowboarder	Derek Hough; Mark Ballas (Week 4)	Runners-up on May 20, 2014
Meryl Davis	Olympic ice dancer	Maksim Chmerkovskiy; Valentin Chmerkovskiy (Week 4)	Winners on May 20, 2014

=== Host and judges ===
Len Goodman, Carrie Ann Inaba and Bruno Tonioli returned as judges; Tom Bergeron returned as host, while Erin Andrews replaced Brooke Burke Charvet as co-host. Bandleader Ray Chew replaced the Harold Wheeler orchestra and singers.

Beginning in week three, a celebrity guest judge joined the judges panel. As a result, couples could receive a top score of 40 for their dances.

Date	Guest judge	Occupation(s)	Ref.
March 31	Robin Roberts	Anchor of Good Morning America	
April 7	Julianne Hough	Actress, singer, dancer & choreographer	
April 14	Donny Osmond	Singer, actor & season 9 winner	
April 21	Redfoo	Singer/rapper (member of LMFAO) & season 20 contestant	
April 28	Ricky Martin	Singer, actor & author	
May 5	Abby Lee Miller	Choreographer & dance instructor on Dance Moms	
May 12	Kenny Ortega	Producer, director & choreographer	

== Episodes ==
No. overall	No. in season	Title	Rating (18–49)	Original release date	U.S. viewers (millions)
319	1	"First Dances"	2.56	March 17, 2014	15.44
320	2	"Celebrity's Pick Night"	2.30	March 24, 2014	14.49
321	3	"Most Memorable Year Night"	2.29	March 31, 2014	14.10
322	4	"Switch-Up Night"	2.17	April 7, 2014	14.47
323	5	"Disney Night"	2.33	April 14, 2014	14.78
324	6	"Party Anthems Night"	2.17	April 21, 2014	14.06
325	7	"Latin Night"	2.57	April 28, 2014	15.88
326	8	"Celebrity Dance Duels Night"	1.91	May 5, 2014	13.12
327	9	"American Icons Night"	2.28	May 12, 2014	14.36
328	10	"Finals: Night 1"	2.59	May 19, 2014	15.66
329	11	"Road to the Finals"	1.64	May 20, 2014	11.64
330	12	"Finals: Night 2"	2.40	May 20, 2014	15.07

== Scoring chart ==
The highest score each week is indicated in bold green with a dagger (†), while the lowest score each week is indicated in italicized red with a double-dagger (‡).

Color key:

Winners
Runners-up
Third place
Withdrew from competition
Eliminated

Dancing with the Stars (season 18) - Weekly scores
Couple	Pl.	Week										
Couple	Pl.	1	2	3	4	5	6	7	8	9	10	
Couple	Pl.	1	2	3	4	5	6	7	8	9	Night 1	Night 2
Meryl & Maks	1st	24	**25**†	**39**†	**39**†	36	**40**†	39+39=**78**†	36+34=70‡	40+40=**80**†	30+30=**60**†	+30=**90**† (Note: This couple finished in first place.)
Amy & Derek	2nd	24	24	36	34	37	38	36+39=75	40+39=**79**†	39+39=78	30+29=59	+30=89 (Note: This couple finished in second place.)
Candace & Mark	3rd	25	21	32	28‡	35	32‡	35+39=74	36+38=74	34+38=72‡	27+24=51‡	+27=78‡ (Note: This couple finished in third place.)
James & Peta	4th	21	**25**†	36	35	**40**†	35	35+35=70	36+39=75	40+36=76	29+29=58 (Note: This couple was eliminated.)	
Charlie & Sharna	5th	**27**†	**25**†	36	33	37	36	36+35=71	40+38=78	40+36=76		
Danica & Val	6th	24	24	36	32	39	36	33+39=72	38+34=72			
NeNe & Tony	7th	21	21	31	32	36	33	31+35=66‡				
Drew & Cheryl	8th	21	21	30‡	33	28‡	32‡					
Cody & Witney	9th	22	22	35	31	34						
Billy Dee & Emma	10th	15‡	15‡	(Note: This couple withdrew from the competition.)								
Sean & Karina	11th	20	21									
Diana & Henry	12th	18										

== Weekly scores ==
Individual judges' scores in the charts below (given in parentheses) are listed in this order from left to right: Carrie Ann Inaba, Len Goodman, Bruno Tonioli.

=== Week 1: First Dances ===
Couples performed either the cha-cha-cha, contemporary, or the foxtrot, and are listed in the order they performed.

Couple	Scores	Dance	Music
NeNe & Tony	21 (7, 7, 7)	Cha-cha-cha	"Give It 2 U" — Robin Thicke, feat. Kendrick Lamar
James & Peta	21 (7, 7, 7)	Foxtrot	"Story of My Life" — One Direction
Danica & Val	24 (8, 8, 8)	Foxtrot	"Walk Away" — Kelly Clarkson
Sean & Karina	20 (7, 6, 7)	Contemporary	"Somewhere Only We Know" — Keane
Billy Dee & Emma	15 (5, 5, 5)	Cha-cha-cha	"Star Wars Theme/Cantina Band" — Meco
Meryl & Maks	24 (8, 8, 8)	Cha-cha-cha	"All Night" — Icona Pop
Candace & Mark	25 (9, 8, 8)	Contemporary	"Burn" — Ellie Goulding
Cody & Witney	22 (7, 7, 8)	Cha-cha-cha	"Timber" — Pitbull, feat. Kesha
Drew & Cheryl	21 (7, 7, 7)	Foxtrot	"Money (That's What I Want)" — Barrett Strong
Amy & Derek	24 (8, 8, 8)	Cha-cha-cha	"Counting Stars" — OneRepublic
Diana & Henry	18 (6, 6, 6)	Foxtrot	"Beyond the Sea" — Bobby Darin
Charlie & Sharna	27 (9, 9, 9)	Contemporary	"Let Her Go"—Passenger

=== Week 2: Celebrity's Pick Night ===
Couples are listed in the order they performed. Two couples were eliminated at the end of the night. Diana Nyad and Henry Byalikov were eliminated before they had a chance to perform their cha-cha-cha, although they did perform in exhibition and received no scores from the judges.

Couple	Scores	Dance	Music	Result
Drew & Cheryl	21 (7, 7, 7)	Jive	"You Can't Sit Down" — The Dovells	Safe
Danica & Val	24 (8, 8, 8)	Samba	"All Nite (Don't Stop)" — Janet Jackson	Safe
Billy Dee & Emma	15 (5, 5, 5)	Tango	"Peter Gunn" — Henry Mancini	Safe
Meryl & Maks	25 (8, 9, 8)	Swing	"Big and Bad" — Big Bad Voodoo Daddy	Safe
Diana & Henry	No scores received	Cha-cha-cha	"Move Your Feet" — Junior Senior	Eliminated
Candace & Mark	21 (7, 7, 7)	Rumba	"Say Something" —A Great Big World & Christina Aguilera	Safe
Amy & Derek	24 (8, 8, 8)	Swing	"Swing Set" — Jurassic 5	Safe
James & Peta	25 (9, 8, 8)	Salsa	"Follow the Leader" — Wisin & Yandel, feat. Jennifer Lopez	Safe
Charlie & Sharna	25 (9, 7, 9)	Tango	"Addicted to You" — Avicii	Safe
NeNe & Tony	21 (7, 7, 7)	Jive	"Do My Thing" — Estelle, feat. Janelle Monáe	Safe
Sean & Karina	21 (7, 7, 7)	Salsa	"Dance Bailalo" —Kat DeLuna	Eliminated
Cody & Witney	22 (7, 7, 8)	Tango	"Yeah 3x" — Chris Brown	Safe

=== Week 3: Most Memorable Year Night ===
Individual judges scores in the chart below (given in parentheses) are listed in this order from left to right: Carrie Ann Inaba, Len Goodman, Robin Roberts, Bruno Tonioli.

At the beginning of the show, it was announced that Billy Dee Williams had to withdraw from the competition due to a chronic back problem. Therefore, no one was eliminated at the end of the show. Couples are listed in the order they performed.

Couple	Scores	Dance	Music
James & Peta	36 (9, 9, 9, 9)	Jive	"The Middle" — Jimmy Eat World
NeNe & Tony	31 (8, 7, 8, 8)	Rumba	"I Believe in You and Me" — Whitney Houston
Cody & Witney	35 (9, 8, 9, 9)	Jazz	"Surfboard" — Cody Simpson
Danica & Val	36 (9, 9, 9, 9)	Contemporary	"Lullabye (Goodnight, My Angel)" — Billy Joel
Drew & Cheryl	30 (7, 7, 8, 8)	Waltz	"Fade into You" — Sam Palladio & Clare Bowen
Meryl & Maks	39 (10, 9, 10, 10)	Foxtrot	"All of Me" — John Legend
Amy & Derek	36 (9, 9, 9, 9)	Contemporary	"Human" — Christina Perri
Charlie & Sharna	36 (9, 9, 9, 9)	Jive	"Happy" — Pharrell Williams
Candace & Mark	32 (8, 8, 8, 8)	Jive	"Blue Suede Shoes" — Elvis Presley

=== Week 4: Switch-Up Night ===
Individual judges scores in the chart below (given in parentheses) are listed in this order from left to right: Carrie Ann Inaba, Len Goodman, Julianne Hough, Bruno Tonioli.

The couples switched professional partners this week and learned a new dance style. Due to the nature of the week, no elimination took place at the end of the show. Couples are listed in the order they performed.

Couple	Scores	Dance	Music
Candace & Tony	28 (7, 7, 7, 7)	Quickstep	"The Ballroom Blitz" — Sweet
James & Cheryl	35 (9, 8, 9, 9)	Tango	"Dark Horse" — Katy Perry, feat. Juicy J
Drew & Witney	33 (8, 8, 9, 8)	Cha-cha-cha	"Sugarfoot" — Black Joe Lewis & the Honeybears
Danica & Maks	32 (8, 8, 8, 8)	Jive	"Love Me Right!" — The Swag Geeks, feat. Brook Penning
Charlie & Peta	33 (7, 8, 9, 9)	Rumba	"Wildest Moments" — Jessie Ware
Amy & Mark	34 (9, 8, 8, 9)	Salsa	"Brand New" — Pharrell, feat. Justin Timberlake
Cody & Sharna	31 (8, 7, 8, 8)	Foxtrot	"I'm Yours" — Jason Mraz
NeNe & Derek	32 (8, 8, 8, 8)	Jazz	"Grown Woman" — Beyoncé
Meryl & Val	39 (10, 9, 10, 10)	Argentine tango	"Too Close" — Alex Clare

=== Week 5: Disney Night ===
Individual judges scores in the chart below (given in parentheses) are listed in this order from left to right: Carrie Ann Inaba, Len Goodman, Donny Osmond, Bruno Tonioli.

Couples performed one unlearned dance to a song from a Disney film. Couples are listed in the order they performed.

Couple	Scores	Dance	Music	Disney film	Result
Drew & Cheryl	28 (7, 7, 7, 7)	Quickstep	"Friend Like Me" — Robin Williams	Aladdin	Safe
Charlie & Sharna	37 (9, 10, 9, 9)	Jazz	"Supercalifragilisticexpialidocious" — Julie Andrews & Dick Van Dyke	Mary Poppins	Safe
Danica & Val	39 (10, 9, 10, 10)	Quickstep	"Be Our Guest" — Jerry Orbach & Angela Lansbury	Beauty and the Beast	Safe
Amy & Derek	37 (9, 9, 10, 9)	Waltz	"So This Is Love" — Ilene Woods	Cinderella	Safe
Cody & Witney	34 (9, 8, 8, 9)	Samba	"I Just Can't Wait to Be King" — Jason Weaver, Laura Williams & Rowan Atkinson	The Lion King	Eliminated
NeNe & Tony	36 (9, 9, 9, 9)	Foxtrot	"Cruella De Vil — Bill Lee	101 Dalmatians	Safe
James & Peta	40 (10, 10, 10, 10)	Contemporary	"Let It Go" — Idina Menzel	Frozen	Safe
Meryl & Maks	36 (9, 9, 9, 9)	Samba	"I Wan'na Be Like You (The Monkey Song)" — Louis Prima	The Jungle Book	Safe
Candace & Mark	35 (8, 9, 9, 9)	Samba	"Under the Sea" — Samuel E. Wright	The Little Mermaid	Safe

=== Week 6: Party Anthems Night ===
Individual judges scores in the chart below (given in parentheses) are listed in this order from left to right: Carrie Ann Inaba, Redfoo, Len Goodman, Bruno Tonioli.

Couples are listed in the order they performed.

Couple	Scores	Dance	Music	Result
NeNe & Tony	33 (8, 9, 8, 8)	Salsa	"Hot in Herre" — Nelly	Safe
Candace & Mark	32 (8, 8, 8, 8)	Cha-cha-cha	"I Love It" — Icona Pop, feat. Charli XCX	Safe
James & Peta	35 (9, 9, 8, 9)	Quickstep	"You're the One That I Want" — John Travolta & Olivia Newton-John	Safe
Danica & Val	36 (9, 9, 9, 9)	Cha-cha-cha	"I Wanna Dance with Somebody (Who Loves Me)" — Whitney Houston	Safe
Meryl & Maks	40 (10, 10, 10, 10)	Tango	"Feel So Close" — Calvin Harris	Safe
Drew & Cheryl	32 (8, 9, 7, 8)	Tango	"Super Freak" — Rick James	Eliminated
Charlie & Sharna	36 (9, 9, 9, 9)	Cha-cha-cha	"Gonna Make You Sweat (Everybody Dance Now)" — C+C Music Factory	Safe
Amy & Derek	38 (9, 10, 9, 10)	Jive	"Shout" — The Isley Brothers	Safe

=== Week 7: Latin Night ===
Individual judges scores in the chart below (given in parentheses) are listed in this order from left to right: Carrie Ann Inaba, Ricky Martin, Len Goodman, Bruno Tonioli.

Couples performed one unlearned dance style and one team dance. Due to an injury suffered by Amy Purdy after performing her rumba, Team Loca's dance was scored based on the rehearsal footage filmed prior to the live show. Couples are listed in the order they performed.

Couple	Scores	Dance	Music	Result
Amy & Derek	36 (9, 9, 9, 9)	Rumba	"Light My Fire" — José Feliciano	Safe
James & Peta	35 (9, 9, 8, 9)	Samba	"Gasolina" — Daddy Yankee	Safe
Danica & Val	33 (8, 9, 8, 8)	Salsa	"Watch Out for This (Bumaye)" — Major Lazer, feat. Busy Signal, The Flexican & FS Green	Safe
NeNe & Tony	31 (8, 8, 7, 8)	Argentine tango	"Can't Remember to Forget You" — Shakira, feat. Rihanna	Eliminated
Charlie & Sharna	36 (9, 10, 8, 9)	Paso doble	"Sail" — Awolnation	Safe
Candace & Mark	35 (8, 9, 9, 9)	Argentine tango	"1977" — Ana Tijoux	Safe
Meryl & Maks	39 (10, 10, 9, 10)	Salsa	"Adrenalina" — Wisin, feat. Ricky Martin & Jennifer Lopez	Safe
Charlie & Sharna James & Peta NeNe & Tony	35 (8, 10, 8, 9)	Latin Freestyle (Team Vida)	"La Copa de la Vida" — Ricky Martin	
Amy & Derek Candace & Mark Danica & Val Meryl & Maks	39 (10, 10, 9, 10)	Latin Freestyle (Team Loca)	"Livin' la Vida Loca — Ricky Martin	

=== Week 8: Celebrity Dance Duels Night ===
Individual judges scores in the chart below (given in parentheses) are listed in this order from left to right: Carrie Ann Inaba, Len Goodman, Abby Lee Miller, Bruno Tonioli.

Although billed as "dance duels," the two celebrities in each pairing received the same score. During the routine, the celebrities were required to dance with each other for 20 seconds on the dance floor without their professional partners. Couples are listed in the order they performed.

Couple	Scores	Dance	Music	Result
Charlie & Sharna	40 (10, 10, 10, 10)	Quickstep	"My Heart Goes Boom" — Miss Li	Safe
Danica & Val	38 (10, 9, 9, 10)	Tango	"Everybody Wants to Rule the World" — Lorde	Eliminated
Meryl & Maks	36 (9, 9, 8, 10)	Rumba	"Read All About It (Pt. III)" — Emeli Sandé	Safe
Candace & Mark	36 (9, 9, 9, 9)	Foxtrot	"That's It, I Quit, I'm Movin' On" — Sam Cooke	Safe
James & Peta	36 (8, 9, 10, 9)	Viennese waltz	"6'2" — Marie Miller	Safe
Amy & Derek	40 (10, 10, 10, 10)	Argentine tango	"Heart Upon My Sleeve" — Avicii	Safe
Danica & Val Meryl & Maks	34 (8, 9, 8, 9)	Samba	"I Luh Ya Papi" — Jennifer Lopez, feat. French Montana	
Candace & Mark Charlie & Sharna	38 (9, 9, 10, 10)	Contemporary	"Stay with Me" — Sam Smith	
Amy & Derek James & Peta	39 (9, 10, 10, 10)	Jive	"Ain't Nothing Wrong with That" — Robert Randolph and the Family Band	

=== Week 9: American Icons Night ===
Individual judges scores in the chart below (given in parentheses) are listed in this order from left to right: Carrie Ann Inaba, Len Goodman, Kenny Ortega, Bruno Tonioli.

The semifinalists performed two unlearned dances to songs by American music icons. Couples are listed in the order they performed.

Couple	Scores	Dance	Music	Result
Candace & Mark	34 (8, 9, 9, 8)	Viennese waltz	"If I Knew" — Bruno Mars	Safe
Candace & Mark	38 (9, 10, 10, 9)	Jazz	"Nasty" — Janet Jackson	Safe
Charlie & Sharna	40 (10, 10, 10, 10)	Foxtrot	"New York, New York" — Frank Sinatra	Eliminated
Charlie & Sharna	36 (9, 9, 9, 9)	Samba	"Mo Money Mo Problems" — The Notorious B.I.G.	Eliminated
Amy & Derek	39 (10, 9, 10, 10)	Quickstep	"You Can't Hurry Love" — The Supremes	Safe
Amy & Derek	39 (9, 10, 10, 10)	Jazz	"Too Darn Hot (RAC Mix)" — Ella Fitzgerald	Safe
James & Peta	40 (10, 10, 10, 10)	Cha-cha-cha	"Love Never Felt So Good" — Michael Jackson	Safe
James & Peta	36 (9, 9, 9, 9)	Rumba	"Islands in the Stream" — Kenny Rogers, feat. Dolly Parton	Safe
Meryl & Maks	40 (10, 10, 10, 10)	Jive	"Hound Dog" — Elvis Presley	Safe
Meryl & Maks	40 (10, 10, 10, 10)	Viennese waltz	"Just a Fool" — Christina Aguilera & Blake Shelton	Safe

=== Week 10: Finals ===
The four finalists performed two dances on the first night: the first was a new routine using the same dance style the celebrities had performed in week four with their switch-up partners, but now with their regular pro partners, and the second was a freestyle dance. On the second night, the couples danced a fusion dance of two previously learned dance styles. Couples are listed in the order they performed.

Night 1

Couple	Scores	Dance	Music	Result
James & Peta	29 (9, 10, 10)	Tango	"Adore You (Cedric Gervais Remix)" — Miley Cyrus	Eliminated
James & Peta	29 (10, 9, 10)	Freestyle	"Original Don" — Major Lazer, feat. The Partysquad	Eliminated
Meryl & Maks	30 (10, 10, 10)	Argentine tango	"Montserrat" — Bajofondo	Safe
Meryl & Maks	30 (10, 10, 10)	Freestyle	"Latch (Acoustic)" — Sam Smith	Safe
Candace & Mark	27 (9, 9, 9)	Quickstep	"Umbrella" — The Baseballs	Safe
Candace & Mark	24 (8, 8, 8)	Freestyle	"Canned Heat" — Jamiroquai	Safe
Amy & Derek	30 (10, 10, 10)	Salsa	"Ran Kan Kan" — Tito Puente	Safe
Amy & Derek	29 (10, 9, 10)	Freestyle	"Dare You" — Hardwell	Safe

Night 2

Couple	Scores	Dance	Music	Result
Amy & Derek	30 (10, 10, 10)	Argentine tango & Cha-cha-cha	"Rather Be" — Clean Bandit, feat. Jess Glynne	Runners-up
Candace & Mark	27 (9, 9, 9)	Quickstep & Samba	"Sir Duke" — Stevie Wonder	Third place
Meryl & Maks	30 (10, 10, 10)	Cha-cha-cha & Foxtrot	"Glowing" — Nikki Williams	Winners

== Dance chart ==
The couples performed the following each week:

- Week 1: One unlearned dance (cha-cha-cha, contemporary, or foxtrot)
- Week 2: One unlearned dance
- Week 3: One unlearned dance
- Week 4: One unlearned dance
- Week 5: One unlearned dance
- Week 6: One unlearned dance
- Week 7: One unlearned dance & team dance
- Week 8: One unlearned dance & dance duel
- Week 9: Two unlearned dances
- Week 10 (Finals, Night 1): "Partner Switch-Up Night" dance & freestyle
- Week 10 (Finals, Night 2): Fusion dance

Color key:

No scores received

Dancing with the Stars (season 18) - Dance chart
Couple	Week														
Couple	1	2	3	4	5	6	7		8		9		10		
Couple	1	2	3	4	5	6	7		8		9		Night 1		Night 2
Meryl & Maks	Cha-cha-cha	Swing	Foxtrot	Argentine tango	Samba	Tango	Salsa	Team Freestyle	Rumba	Samba	Jive	Viennese waltz	Argentine tango	Freestyle	Cha-cha-cha & Foxtrot
Amy & Derek	Cha-cha-cha	Swing	Contemp.	Salsa	Waltz	Jive	Rumba	Team Freestyle	Argentine tango	Jive	Quickstep	Jazz	Salsa	Freestyle	Argentine tango & Cha-cha-cha
Candace & Mark	Contemp.	Rumba	Jive	Quickstep	Samba	Cha-cha-cha	Argentine tango	Team Freestyle	Foxtrot	Contemp.	Viennese waltz	Jazz	Quickstep	Freestyle	Quickstep & Samba
James & Peta	Foxtrot	Salsa	Jive	Tango	Contemp.	Quickstep	Samba	Team Freestyle	Viennese waltz	Jive	Cha-cha-cha	Rumba	Tango	Freestyle	Freestyle (Note: No scores were received for this dance.)
Charlie & Sharna	Contemp.	Tango	Jive	Rumba	Jazz	Cha-cha-cha	Paso doble	Team Freestyle	Quickstep	Contemp.	Foxtrot	Samba			Jazz
Danica & Val	Foxtrot	Samba	Contemp.	Jive	Quickstep	Cha-cha-cha	Salsa	Team Freestyle	Tango	Samba					Freestyle
NeNe & Tony	Cha-cha-cha	Jive	Rumba	Jazz	Foxtrot	Salsa	Argentine tango	Team Freestyle							Jazz
Drew & Cheryl	Foxtrot	Jive	Waltz	Cha-cha-cha	Quickstep	Tango									Jive
Cody & Witney	Cha-cha-cha	Tango	Jazz	Foxtrot	Samba										
Billy Dee & Emma	Cha-cha-cha	Tango													
Sean & Karina	Contemp.	Salsa													
Diana & Henry	Foxtrot	Cha-cha-cha													
