= Camryn (singer) =

American pop singer and musician (1999–2025)

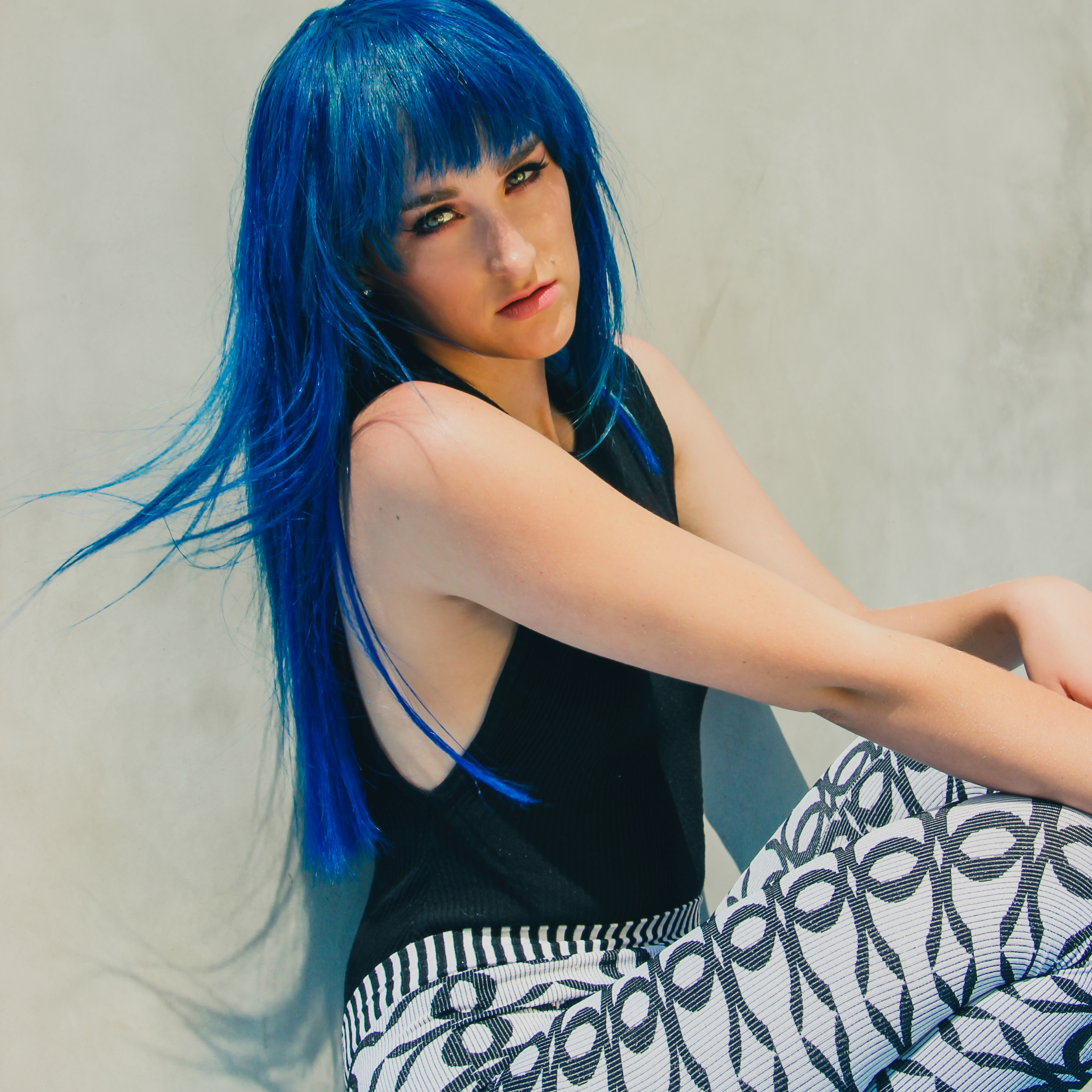
- Camryn in 2017

Background information
- Born: July 14, 1999; Denver, Colorado, U.S.
- Died: December 5, 2025 (aged 26) Miami, Florida, U.S.
- Genres: Pop
- Occupations: Singer; musician
- Instruments: Piano; vocals; guitar; drums
- Years active: 2008–2025
- Label: 5280 Media
- Website: www.camrynmusic.com

Camryn Betsy Magness (July 14, 1999 – December 5, 2025), known mononymously as Camryn, was an American singer and musician. She gained attention through YouTube videos she posted in 2010, which led to her first American tour alongside Greyson Chance and Cody Simpson. She joined One Direction on their Up All Night Tour in 2011, rejoining them for 63 sold-out shows on their 2013 Take Me Home tour of Europe. In 2016, she joined Fifth Harmony on their European 7/27 Tour.

== Early life ==
Camryn Betsy Magness was born in Denver, Colorado, on July 14, 1999, the daughter of Sarah and Gary Magness. She had a sister named Chelsea and a brother named Cable. Her grandfather was Mo Siegel, a businessman best known as the co-founder of the tea company Celestial Seasonings. At the age of eight, she volunteered at the 2008 edition of the Denver Rescue Mission's annual Christmas Banquet.

== Career ==
=== 2008–2011: Career beginnings ===
In late 2008, Camryn was signed to 5280 Media and moved to Los Angeles. Throughout 2009, Camryn wrote and recorded her first single "Wait and See" with Frank Shooflar of the band Blessed by a Broken Heart and long-time family friend Lennon Murphy. The song was subsequently mixed by Brian Malouf (known for producing songs from Michael Jackson, Pink and Madonna). John Schultz chose "Wait and See" to serve as the title track in the 2011 film adaptation of the children's book Judy Moody and the Not Bummer Summer. The film was produced by Smokewood Entertainment. Additionally, the music video for "Wait and See" featured Family Matters star and Dancing with the Stars contestant Jaleel White.

In April 2011, it was announced that Camryn had joined Cody Simpson and Greyson Chance on their Waiting 4U Tour. The tour stopped at venues across the United States and hit major markets including Chicago, New York City and Los Angeles. During the summer of 2011, Camryn toured the Midwestern United States with Allstar Weekend.

In fall 2011, Camryn started her own tour called the "Back 2 School Tour" after her touring management realized some of the artists she was offered to join for their tours were not family-friendly ones. The tour began on November 7, 2011, in La Quinta, California. Camryn spent the next several months touring the United States, performing at nearly 100 schools and for over 80,000 students. During this time, she also performed her new single "Set the Night on Fire" on dozens of television and radio programs.

=== 2012: Breakthrough and One Direction tour ===
Camryn's second single, "Set the Night on Fire", was also written by Camryn, Frank Schooflar, and Lennon Murphy and produced by Spider and Murphy. The single was mixed by industry veteran Tony Maserati, and debuted on Top 40 radio in the United States in May 2012. The song steadily gained airplay on various stations, including the nationally syndicated Sirius XM Top Top 20 on 20 and in major markets like Las Vegas and San Francisco.

On February 16, 2012, Camryn rejoined former tourmate Greyson Chance on his arena tour in Asia. The tour began in Kuala Lumpur, Malaysia on April 17, 2012. In the days leading up to the concert, she made many radio appearances; she also appeared on The 8TV Quickie late-night television program. The following day, Camryn performed at the Festive Grand Theatre in Singapore. Camryn then made stops at Jitec Hall in Jakarta and the Smart Araneta Coliseum in Manila before returning to Los Angeles.

One month later, Camryn joined British boy band One Direction on their Up All Night Tour of the United States. On the tour's first night, Camryn debuted a new song, "Now or Never", and received favorable reviews for her performances in each city.

In fall 2012, Camryn joined with brands Tilly's and High School Nation to headline a Warped Tour style festival with The Rocket Summer, BLUSH, PK Band (Red Bull Records) and The Stamps. The Tilly's High School Nation tour hit major markets across California and raised money to help keep the arts in the classroom. The event included local vendors as well as booths from Jamba Juice, LA Music Academy, Brooks Institute, FIDM, Music Saves Lives, The Canvas Foundation, Academy of Art University, American Musical and Dramatic Academy as well as staging and concert production from Ernie Ball. During this time, Camryn invited local radio and television stations to the concerts and received many reviews, which called her performance "remarkable".

Camryn's third single, "Now or Never", was debuted exclusively on the One Direction tour in summer 2012, and premiered on Top 40 Radio in the United States on October 16, 2012. Within its first week on the radio, Camryn had become the number 1 Most Added Independent Artist on the chart, which included adds across Top 40, Rhythmic and Adult Contemporary stations. On November 15, 2012, MTV Buzzworthy debuted her music video for "Now or Never" on the blog, which trended to the homepage of MTV.com. Additionally, American Top 40 host Ryan Seacrest posted the video while commenting on the success of her career in such a short time. During her off time, Camryn visited radio stations across the United States to perform and promote "Now or Never".

After releasing her One Direction tour exclusive single "Now or Never" and becoming the number 1 Most Added Independent Artist at Top 40 radio for a second time, Camryn was invited to rejoin One Direction for the remainder of their U.S. tour dates for 2012. After playing nine sold-out shows with them at this point, One Direction reinvited Camryn again to open for them on 63 sold-out shows on their 2013 European Take Me Home Tour.

=== 2013: Take Me Home Tour and "Lovesick" ===
In early 2013, Camryn toured with One Direction for 63 sold-out arena concerts on the Take Me Home Tour, making 37 stops all across the United Kingdom before hitting major markets in Europe over a four-month period. Camryn was also joined by openers 5 Seconds of Summer for the 37 United Kingdom tour dates.

While on tour, Camryn showcased her fourth single "Lovesick", performing it for radio stations and on television shows across the continent. The largest audience was on May 8, 2013, when Camryn performed for over 36,000 people at the Stockholm Friends Arena in Sweden. In May 19, in Verona, Italy, Camryn was on top of the Arena di Verona with One Direction on syndicated tabloid TMZ.

After returning to Los Angeles, Camryn announced on Twitter that her next single would be "Lovesick". The single was released in October 2013, and charted on Top 40 and Rhythmic Radio in the United States.

=== 2016: "Machines" ===
Camryn released a single entitled "Machines" on March 25, 2016. The video for the song premiered exclusively via Fuse and fuse.tv. She also was a supporting act for Fifth Harmony on several stops of their European leg of the 7/27 Tour.

== Personal life and death ==
Magness was engaged to Christian Name, with whom she owned dogs named Brooklyn and Zeppelin.

On December 5, 2025, Magness died at the age of 26 after being struck while riding an electric scooter in Miami.

== Discography ==
=== Singles ===
Taken from iTunes and SoundCloud.

- 2017: "Glow"
- 2016: "Machines"
- 2014: "Supermad"
- 2014: "Like Madonna"
- 2013: "Lovesick"
- 2012: "Now or Never"
- 2012: "Now or Never (Remix)"
- 2011: "Set the Night on Fire"
- 2011: "Summer"
- 2010: "Wait and See"

== Tours ==
- 2011: Waiting 4U Tour
- 2011: North America Tour w/ Allstar Weekend
- 2011–12: Back 2 School Tour
- 2012: Greyson Chance Asia Tour
- 2012: One Direction Up All Night Tour
- 2012: Tilly's High School Nation Tour
- 2013: One Direction Take Me Home Tour (63 shows in Europe)
- 2016: Fifth Harmony The 7/27 Tour (European dates)
