= Waiting for You =

Waiting for You may refer to:

== Film ==
- Waiting for You (film), a British mystery drama film

== Music ==
=== Albums ===
- Waiting for You (Gordon Lightfoot album), 1993
- Waiting for You (F4 album), 2007
- Waiting for You (Lindsay Dracass album), 2019

=== Songs ===
- "Waiting for You" (Seal song), 2003
- "Waiting for You" (Sharon O'Neill song), 1981
- "Waiting for You", 1968 hit song for BZN #24
- "Waiting for You", a song on the B-side of Andy Gibb's single "Desire"
- "Waiting for You", a song on the Bangles' album Everything
- "Waiting for You", a song on Corey Hart's album Boy in the Box
- "Waiting for You", a song on Golden Earring's album Just Earrings
- "Waiting for You", a song on Gotye's album Boardface
- "Waiting for You", a song on Jay Chou's album Greatest Works of Art
- "Waiting for You", a musical piece in The Bodyguard: Original Soundtrack Album, composed by Kenny G
- "Waitin for You", a song by Demi Lovato
- "Waiting for You", a song by Sick Individuals and DBSTF

== See also ==
- I've Been Waiting for You (disambiguation)
- "Tired of Waiting for You", a song by The Kinks
- "Right Here Waiting", a song by Richard Marx
- "Say Say Say (Waiting 4 U)", song by Hi_Tack
- Waiting 4U Tour, Cody Simpson concert tour
- "Waiting for a Girl Like You", Foreigner single
