= Surfers Paradise (album) =

Studio album by Cody Simpson
- Released: 12 July 2013
- Genre: Pop, R&B
- Length: 27:43
- Label: Atlantic
- Producer: Lucas Secon; DJ Frank E; Adam Messinger; Nasri; A.C; CJ Baran; Shawn Campbell; Andrew Goldstein; Dr. Luke; Supa Dups; Matt Squire; Alex Dezen; Chris Morris; Emanuel Kiriakou; Drew Pearson; The Futuristics; Watt; Wayne Wilkins

Cody Simpson chronology
Paradise (2012)	Surfers Paradise (2013)	Free (2015)

Singles from Surfers Paradise
- 1. "Pretty Brown Eyes" Released: 23 April 2013; 2. "Summertime of Our Lives" Released: 17 June 2013; 3. "La Da Dee" Released: 12 September 2013; 4. "Surfboard" Released: 15 April 2014

Surfers Paradise is the second studio album by Australian recording artist Cody Simpson, released on 16 July 2013 by Atlantic Records. The album includes the singles "Pretty Brown Eyes", "Summertime of Our Lives", and "La Da Dee". The album is named after the Surfers Paradise beach on Gold Coast, Queensland, Australia, where Simpson grew up. This was Simpson's second and final studio album under Atlantic Records.

The album debuted at number 10 on the US Billboard 200 with over 24,000 copies sold in its first week.

== Background ==
On 18 May 2013, Simpson announced that his upcoming second studio album Surfers Paradise would be released on 16 July. The album would include the already released single "Pretty Brown Eyes", which was described by Billboard as a "happy-go-lucky... summer anthem".

Of the album title, Simpson explained to Seventeen magazine "I try to stay very, very true to my roots and my lifestyle and I wanted to be able to share that with my fans. I thought that the title was perfect because I wanted to stay in the paradise theme but also build a title that would reflect that and the sound of the music". He also explained that the album was "definitely a classic summer album" sound-wise, and that there would be "a few reggae songs... a lot of acoustic guitar, some ukulele".

== Promotion ==
To promote the album, Simpson appeared on various television and radio shows both in North America and in Australia, including the Young Hollywood Awards, The Morning Show, and Sunrise.

He also commenced his first headlining tour, the Paradise Tour, on 30 May 2013. This tour consisted of 48 shows throughout the United States and Canada, and finished on 31 January 2014. The concerts included songs from Surfers Paradise, as well as Simpson's previous album Paradise, and EPs Coast to Coast and 4 U.

== Singles ==
- "Pretty Brown Eyes" was released as the lead single from the album on 23 April 2013.
- "Summertime of Our Lives" was released as the second single from the album on 18 June 2013
- "La Da Dee" was released as the third single from the album on 12 September 2013. This song was featured in the film Cloudy with a Chance of Meatballs 2 as well as the Nickelodeon Original Movie, One Crazy Cruise.
- "Surfboard" was released as a stand alone single on 15 April 2014. The music video featured his then-girlfriend, Gigi Hadid. "Surfboard" was later added to the Expanded Edition of Surfers Paradise, which was released on streaming in 2019.

== Track listing ==
Surfers Paradise – Standard edition
No.	Title	Writer(s)	Length
1.	"La Da Dee"	Cody Simpson, Wayne Wilkins, Antwoine Collins, K'naan, Rome Ramirez, Rich King, Kevin Anyaeji	3:18
2.	"Pretty Brown Eyes"	Simpson, Theron & Timothy Thomas, Alexandre Castillo Vasquez	2:49
3.	"No Ceiling"	Simpson, Lucas Secon, T Coles, Mintman	3:37
4.	"Sinkin' In"	Andrew Watt	3:38
5.	"Summertime of Our Lives"	Simpson, Toby Gad, Nolan Sipe, Ryan Petersen, Emanuel Kiriakou	3:17
6.	"Imma Be Cool" (featuring Asher Roth)	Simpson, Roth, Ryan Williamson, Jacob Lutrell, Chewzie	4:01
7.	"If You Left Him for Me"	Simpson, Alex DeLeon, CJ Baran, Matt Squire	3:55
8.	"Love" (featuring Ziggy Marley)	Simpson, Ziggy Marley, Michael Warren, Brandon Salaam-Bailey, Alex Schwartz, Joe Khajadourian	3:13
Total length:			27:43

Surfers Paradise – Deluxe edition (bonus tracks)
No.	Title	Writer(s)	Length
9.	"Better Be Mine"	Baran, Jimmy Welsh, Kevin Bard	2:50
10.	"Children of the Ocean"	Watt, Simpson	3:09
11.	"Rainy Day"	Alex Dezen, Lutrell	3:27
12.	"Awake All Night"	Simpson	3:05
Total length:			40:12

Surfers Paradise – Expanded edition (bonus tracks)
No.	Title	Writer(s)	Length
13.	"Pretty Brown Eyes" (acoustic version)	Vasquez, Simpson, Theron & Timothy Thomas	3:07
14.	"La Da Dee" (acoustic version)	Simpson, Wilkins, Collins, K'naan, Ramirez, King, Anyaeji	3:34
15.	"Pretty Brown Eyes (featuring Ish)"	Vasquez, Simpson, Theron & Timothy Thomas	2:49
16.	"Surfboard"	Jon Bellion, Watt, Baran, Simpson	2:56
Total length:			52:34

== Charts ==
Chart performance for Surfers Paradise
Chart (2013)	Peak position
Australian Albums (ARIA)	25
Belgian Albums (Ultratop Flanders)	38
Canadian Albums (Billboard)	2
Danish Albums (Hitlisten)	30
Dutch Albums (Album Top 100)	50
French Albums (SNEP)	130
Irish Albums (IRMA)	29
New Zealand Albums (RMNZ)	9
Norwegian Albums (VG-lista)	20
Scottish Albums (OCC)	44
Spanish Albums (Promusicae)	25
UK Albums (OCC)	30
US Billboard 200	10

== Release history ==
Release history for Surfers Paradise
Country	Date	Format	Label
Australia	12 July 2013	CD, digital download	Warner Music Australia
