= Paradise Tour (disambiguation) =

Paradise Tour is a 2013–14 concert tour by Lana Del Rey.

Paradise Tour may also refer to:

- Paradise Tour, a 1984–85 concert tour by Barry Manilow
- Paradise Tour (Cody Simpson), a 2013–14 concert tour
