= Henry Byalikov =

Australian dancer

- Born: 5 December 1985 (age 40); Sydney, Australia
- Occupation: Dancer

Henry Byalikov is an Australian reality show personality and dancer. He best known for his appearances on Dancing with the Stars.

== Career ==
Byalikov began his dancing career at the age of 9. When he was only 11, he became the Australian Juvenile Graded Latin Champion. He also acquired other accolades such as Undefeated State Adult Latin and Ballroom Champion, and South Pacific Champion.

At the age of 18 he made his first TV appearance on the Australian show Strictly Dancing. When he turned 22 he competed on So You Think You Can Dance Australia and placed in the top 4 males of the country. He then appeared on the eighth season of the Australian version of Dancing with the Stars as a professional dancer paired with TV presenter Toni Pearen.

Following his success in Australia, he was invited to represent his nation in the couple's category of NBC's Superstars of Dance. He and his partner received Bronze for Australia. In 2010 he took part on So You Think You Can Dance as a guest partner where he received rave reviews from Nigel Lythgoe, Mia Michaels and Adam Shankman.

Henry was hand-picked by Australia's leading contemporary ballet choreographer Mr Graeme Murphy to perform as a principal dancer in his brand new Contemporary ballet company 'Graeme Murphy’s Suite Synergy 2011. He was also a featured dancer on Baz Luhrmann's The Great Gatsby as well as a rehearsal dance partner to the lead actress. The end of 2011 brought him back to The Trocadero Dance Palace for the Sydney Festival in January 2012, and he was later featured in the Australian Academy of Cinema and Television Arts (AACTA) Awards Opening Ceremony, which aired on the Australian television network Channel Nine.

In 2012, Byalikov was featured on the U.S. version of Dancing with the Stars as a member of the Dance Troupe. After spending four seasons on the Dance Troupe, Byalikov became a competing professional dancer on the show's 18th season. He paired with long-distance swimmer, Diana Nyad and were the first couple eliminated. He returned to the Dance Troupe for the show's 19th season and 20th season. In 2014 and 2015, Henry was also a performer in the popular dance musical Sway: A Dance Trilogy. Also in 2015 he starred in the dance musical In Your Arms from September to October, and the dance musical Forever Tango in November. Henry performed in the stage musical version of Dirty Dancing in 2016 and 2017. He currently performs in the US tour for the stage musical of The Bodyguard

== Dancing with the Stars Australia ==
Season	Partner	Place
8	Toni Pearen	5th

=== Scoring Chart ===
Red numbers indicate the lowest score for the week.
Green numbers indicate the highest score for the week.

1^{1}	2^{1}	3	4	5	6	7	8	9	10
35	31	23	28	24	24	25+18=43			

^1 In Weeks 1 and 2, special guest judge Bruno Tonioli was part of the judging panel, and scores were out of 40 instead of 30.

== Dancing with the Stars United States ==
Season	Partner	Place
18	Diana Nyad	12th

=== Scoring Chart ===
- Season 18 – With celebrity partner: Diana Nyad

Week #	Dance/Song	Judges' score			Result
Week #	Dance/Song	Inaba	Goodman	Tonioli	Result
1	Foxtrot / "Beyond the Sea"	6	6	6	No Elimination
2	Cha-cha-cha / "Move Your Feet"	No Scores Given			Eliminated
