= Baby Blue (Cody Simpson song) =

Single by Cody Simpson
- Released: 27 March 2026
- Length: 2:51
- Label: BMG
- Songwriters: Cody Simpson; Harrison Borts; Bailey Bryan
- Producers: Cody Simpson; Harrison Borts

Cody Simpson singles chronology
"Fly" (2024)	"Baby Blue" (2026)

"Baby Blue" is a song by Australian singer Cody Simpson. It was released on 27 March 2026 with "When It Comes to Loving You" as the B-side. It's the first after signing a new deal with BMG.

Upon release, Simpson said he had "been experimenting in the studio for almost a year when one day I came in extremely open hearted and open-minded, sensing something vibrant and new wanted to come through. I grabbed a guitar next to my friend and producer Harrison Borts on synths, and this is where the sound that birthed 'Baby Blue' and 'When It Comes to Loving You' was born. I hope everybody enjoys listening to them as much as I enjoyed making them."

== Music video ==
The music video for "Baby Blue" was released the same day. It was directed by Antony Muse and shot across Los Angeles.

== Track listing ==
digital single

1. "Baby Blue" - 2:51
2. "When It Comes to Loving You" - 2:30

== Charts ==
Chart performance for "Baby Blue"
Chart (2026)	Peak position
Australia Digital Singles (ARIA)	48
Australian Artist Singles (ARIA)	13
NZ Hot Singles Chart (RMNZ)	15
