= DJ Frank E =

American DJ, record producer, and songwriter from Colorado

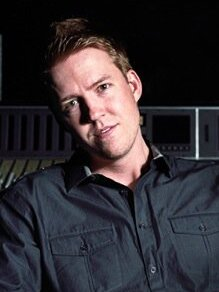
- DJ Frank E around 2010

Background information
- Born: Justin Scott Franks
- Origin: Denver, Colorado, U.S.
- Genres: R&B; hip hop; pop
- Years active: 2002−present
- Labels: APG; Atlantic Records

Justin Scott Franks, known professionally as DJ Frank E, is an American DJ and music producer from Denver, Colorado.

Frank E started working closely with Adelio Lombardi, founder of Side 3 Entertainment and owner of Side 3 Studios in Denver, while working his way up in the Denver club circuit as a DJ/remixer and as a member of the Radiobums DJ crew. He began focusing all of his free time on becoming a producer. In 2007, DJ Frank E submitted a track via PMP Worldwide, and was discovered by Mike Caren of Artist Publishing Group and Atlantic Records, who signed him in early 2008.

Since 2008, Frank E has produced songs for Flo Rida, Pitbull, Enrique Iglesias, Justin Bieber, Kanye West, Lecrae, Charlie Puth, The Vamps, Lil Wayne, G-Eazy, Ed Sheeran, Madonna, Jason Derulo, Wiz Khalifa, The Black Eyed Peas, Chris Brown, PnB Rock, Travie McCoy, Sean Kingston, Toni Braxton, B.o.B, Three 6 Mafia, Leona Lewis, The Lonely Island, and many others.

== Discography ==
Year	Artist	Album	Track
2008	T-Pain	Pr33 Ringz (preview for Thr33 Ringz)	"Super Man" featuring DJ Khaled
2008	Flo Rida	Mail on Sunday	"Me & U"
2008	Plies	Definition of Real	"Please Excuse My Hands"
2009	Flo Rida	R.O.O.T.S.	"Right Round featuring Kesha and DJ Frank E"
2009	Madonna	Celebration	"Revolver"
2009	Chamillionaire	Venom	"Good Morning"
2009	Toni Braxton	Pulse	"Yesterday"
2009	Sean Kingston	Tomorrow	"Shoulda Let You Go" featuring Good Charlotte
2009	Ludacris		"Work for It"
2009	Omar Cruz		"Where The Booty At" featuring Pitbull
2009	Black Dada		"Round, Round, Round"
2009	Justin Bieber	My World	"Love Me"
2009	DJ Tiesto	Kaleidoscope	"Who Wants to Be Alone" featuring Nelly Furtado
2009	Shontelle	Licky	"Licky (Under the Covers)"
2009	Three 6 Mafia	Laws of Power	"Feel It" featuring Flo Rida, Sean Kingston & DJ Tiesto
2010	B.o.B	B.o.B Presents: The Adventures of Bobby Ray	"Airplanes" featuring Hayley Williams of Paramore
2010	B.o.B	B.o.B Presents: The Adventures of Bobby Ray	"The Kids"
2010	Black Dada		"Naughty Girl"
2010	Sky Ferreira		"Obsession"
2010	Cody Simpson		"Summertime"
2010	Cody Simpson	4 U	"iYiYi" featuring Flo Rida
2010	Travie McCoy	Lazarus	"Superbad" (11:34)
2010	Trina		"Dang-A-Lang" featuring Lady Saw & Nicki Minaj
2010	Estelle	All of Me	"Fall in Love" featuring John Legend & Nas
2010	Flo Rida	Only One Flo (Part 1)	"Turn Around (5, 4, 3, 2, 1)"
2010	Enrique Iglesias	Euphoria	"Tonight (I'm Lovin' You)" featuring Ludacris and DJ Frank E
2010	Chris Brown	F.A.M.E.	"Yeah 3x"
2010	Kanye West	My Beautiful Dark Twisted Fantasy	"Blame Game" featuring John Legend
2010	The Black Eyed Peas	The Beginning	"Someday"
2010	The Lonely Island	Turtleneck and Chain	"I Just Had Sex"
2010	Tino Cochino		"I Go Hard" featuring Three 6 Mafia & DJ Frank E
2011	Akon	Stadium	"Drop Down" featuring Ludacris
2011	Pitbull	Planet Pit	"Mr. Right Now" featuring Akon and DJ Frank E
2011	Pitbull	Planet Pit	"Castle Made of Sand" featuring Kelly Rowland and Jamie Drastik
2011	Jason Derulo	Future History	"Breathing"
2011	Inna	Party Never Ends	"More than Friends" featuring Daddy Yankee
2011	Ed Sheeran	+	"Kiss Me"
2012	Cody Simpson	Paradise	"So Listen"
2012	CROSS GENE	Timeless:Begins	"La Di Da Di"
2012	Flo Rida	Wild Ones	"Whistle"
2012	Jason Derulo	Future History	"Undefeated"
2012	Leona Lewis	Glassheart	"Glassheart"
2013	Nelly	M.O.	"Hey Porsche"
2013	Delta Goodrem		"Heart Hypnotic"
2013	Lupe Fiasco	Tetsuo & Youth	"Old School Love"
2014	Pitbull	Globalization	"Celebrate"
2014	Flo Rida	My House	"G.D.F.R."
2014	Enrique Iglesias	Sex and Love	"There Goes My Baby"
2015	Flo Rida	My House	"Here It Is" featuring Chris Brown"
2015	Wiz Khalifa	Furious 7: Original Motion Picture Soundtrack	"See You Again" featuring Charlie Puth
2015	Prince Royce	Furious 7: Original Motion Picture Soundtrack	"My Angel"
2015	Sevyn Streeter	Furious 7: Original Motion Picture Soundtrack	"How Bad Do You Want It (Oh Yeah)"
2015	Natalie La Rose		"Around the World" featuring Fetty Wap
2015	Chris Brown & Tyga	Fan of a Fan:The Album	"She Goin Up"
2016	Charlie Puth	Nine Track Mind	"One Call Away"
2016	Charlie Puth	Nine Track Mind	"Left Right Left"
2016	Lecrae	The Birth of a Nation: The Inspired By Album	"On My Own" (featuring Leon Bridges)
2016	Flo Rida		"Who's With Me?"
2016	The Vamps		"All Night" featuring Matoma
2016	Gnash		"Home" featuring Johnny Yukon
2017	Young Rising Sons		"Carry On"
2017	G-Eazy	The Fate of the Furious: The Album	"Good Life" featuring Kehlani
2017	Flo Rida		"Game Time" featuring Sage the Gemini
2017	Lecrae	All Things Work Together	"I'll Find You" featuring Tori Kelly
2017	Flo Rida		"Dancer"
2017	The Vamps		"Stay"
2018	Charlie Puth	Voicenotes	"How Long"
	OneRepublic	13 Reasons Why: Season 2 Soundtrack	"Start Again" feat Logic
2020	Louis Tomlinson	Walls	"Too Young"
	Lecrae		"Drown" feat John Legend
2021	Skylar Grey	Venom: Let There Be Carnage	"Last One Standing" feat Polo G, Mozzy, and Eminem
