= Paradise (Cody Simpson album) =

Studio album by Cody Simpson
- Released: 2 October 2012
- Length: 32:30
- Label: Atlantic
- Producer: DJ Frank E; Adam Messinger; Nasri; Shawn Campbell; Dr. Luke; Supa Dups; Alex Dezen; Chris Morris; Drew Pearson

Cody Simpson chronology
Coast to Coast (2011)	Paradise (2012)	Surfers Paradise (2013)

Singles from Paradise
- 1. "Got Me Good" Released: 25 May 2012; 2. "Wish U Were Here" Released: 7 August 2012

Professional ratings
Review scores
Source	Rating
AllMusic	3/5 stars

Paradise is the debut studio album by Australian singer Cody Simpson. It was released on 28 September 2012 by Atlantic Records. The album spawned two singles: "Got Me Good" and "Wish U Were Here" featuring Becky G.

== Background ==
On 12 June 2012, Simpson released Preview to Paradise, a four-song teaser EP. The EP featured the songs "Got Me Good", "So Listen", "Wish U Were Here", and "Gentleman". All of the songs, besides "So Listen" were released as a part of Paradise. Simpson stated the reason behind only having a few collaborations on the album is because "I wanted my debut full length album to be a representation of me." It was released on 28 September 2012.

== Singles ==
On 25 May 2012, the lead single, "Got Me Good" was released as a teaser on Simpson's official website and radio. The accompanying music video was released on 5 June.

"Wish U Were Here", which features American musician Becky G, was the second official single off the album, released on 12 June 2012. The music video debuted on 7 August 2012. Four days later, three remixes of the song were released.

=== Promotional singles ===
"So Listen" was released as a promotional single for Paradise. It features rapper T-Pain. It debuted on Simpson's YouTube channel on 12 March 2012 and was released to iTunes the following day. Simpson stated that the song was not an accurate example of the full album and he only put it on the preview "because my fans like it." The song is included on the Japanese special edition of Paradise.

== Track listing ==
Paradise – Standard edition
No.	Title	Writer(s)	Length
1.	"Paradise"	Nasri Atweh; Hayley Gene; Cody Simpson; Adam Messinger; Nolan Lambroza	3:16
2.	"Got Me Good"	Simpson; John Ryan; Rome; Jennifer Decilveo	2:54
3.	"Be the One"	Colby O'Donis; Simpson; Kay-Ta Matsuno; Bryan Nelson	2:55
4.	"Hello"	Simpson; Drew Pearson; Ryan Marrone; Garrick Smith; Jaden Michaels	3:36
5.	"Tears on Your Pillow"	August Rigo; Simpson; Dwayne Chin-Quee; Mitchum Chin	4:03
6.	"Wish U Were Here" (featuring Becky G)	Taio Cruz; Lukasz Gottwald; Bonnie McKee; Henry Walter; Rebbeca Marie Gomez	3:16
7.	"I Love Girls"	Simpson; Atweh; Messinger; Lambroza; Lizzy	2:49
8.	"Back to You"	Simpson; Jon Bellion	3:36
9.	"Summer Shade"	Simpson; Alex Schwartz; Joe Khajadourian; Michael Warren; Joe West; Jackson Michelson; Craig Paulson; Matt Salinas; Paul Wright	3:05
10.	"Gentleman"	Simpson; Alex Dezen; Edwin Serrano	3:00
Total length:			32:30

Paradise – Japan edition (bonus tracks)
No.	Title	Writer(s)	Length
11.	"So Listen" (featuring T-Pain)	Faheem Najm; Justin Franks; Shawn Campbell; Taylor Ross; Eddie Serrano; Simpson; Mac Faoro	3:06
12.	"The Reason"	Clarence Coffee, Jr.; Jordan Johnson; Stefan Johnson; Marcus "Marc Lo" Lomax
13.	"Torn Up"	David Jost; Geraldo Sandell; Joacim Persson; Niclas Molinder	3:00
14.	"Wish U Were Here" (featuring Becky G) (Sem Thomason Remix)		5:36
15.	"Wish U Were Here" (featuring Becky G) (Digi Radio Edit)		4:18

Paradise – Target edition (bonus tracks)
No.	Title	Writer(s)	Length
11.	"Standing in China"	Max Schneider; Kurt Schneider; Matthew Gerrard	3:18
12.	"The Reason"	Clarence Coffee, Jr.; Jordan Johnson; Stefan Johnson; Marcus "Marc Lo" Lomax
13.	"Torn Up"	David Jost; Geraldo Sandell; Joacim Persson; Niclas Molinder	3:00

Paradise – Digital expanded edition (bonus tracks)
No.	Title	Writer(s)	Length
14.	"Wish U Were Here" (acoustic)		3:36
15.	"So Listen" (featuring T-Pain)	Faheem Najm; Justin Franks; Shawn Campbell; Taylor Ross; Eddie Serrano; Simpson; Mac Faoro	3:06
16.	"Wish U Were Here" (featuring Becky G) (Sem Thomason Remix)		5:36
17.	"Wish U Were Here" (featuring Becky G) (Digi Radio Edit)		4:18
18.	"Wish U Were Here" (featuring Becky G) (DJ Laszlo Remix)		6:21

Preview to Paradise EP
No.	Title	Writer(s)	Length
1.	"Got Me Good"	Simpson; John Ryan; Rome; Jennifer Decilveo	2:56
2.	"Wish U Were Here" (featuring Becky G)	Taio Cruz; Lukasz Gottwald; Bonnie McKee; Henry Walter; Rebbeca Marie Gomez	3:13
3.	"So Listen" (featuring T-Pain)	Faheem Najm; Justin Franks; Shawn Campbell; Taylor Ross; Eddie Serrano; Simpson; Mac Faoro	3:06
4.	"Gentleman"	Simpson; Alex Dezen; Edwin Serrano	3:00
Total length:			12:15

== Charts ==
Chart performance for Paradise
Chart (2012)	Peak position
Australian Albums (ARIA)	31
Belgian Albums (Ultratop Flanders)	40
Belgian Albums (Ultratop Wallonia)	111
Canadian Albums (Billboard)	16
French Albums (SNEP)	157
Irish Albums (IRMA)	53
Spanish Albums (PROMUSICAE)	81
US Billboard 200	27

== Release history ==
Release history and formats for Paradise
Country	Date	Format	Label
Australia	1 August 2012	CD; digital download	Atlantic
Canada	1 August 2012	CD; digital download	Atlantic
New Zealand	1 August 2012	CD; digital download	Atlantic
United Kingdom	1 August 2012	CD; digital download	Atlantic
