= Free (Cody Simpson album) =

Studio album by Cody Simpson
- Released: 10 July 2015
- Recorded: April 2014 – June 2015
- Genre: Rock; acoustic rock
- Length: 49:16
- Label: Coast House Records; Banana Beat Records; The Orchard, Sony
- Producer: Cisco Adler

Cody Simpson chronology
Surfers Paradise (2013)	Free (2015)	Cody Simpson (2022)

Singles from Free
- 1. "Flower" Released: 10 February 2015; 2. "New Problems" Released: 2 March 2015

Free is the third studio album by Australian recording artist Cody Simpson, released in 2015 on Coast House Records (Simpson's personal label) and Bananabeat Records. The album, which represents Simpson's first independent release after leaving Atlantic Records, includes the singles "New Problems" and "Flower". Simpson chose the album title to reflect his desire to make the kind of music he wanted without pressure from outside sources.

== Track listing ==
All songs written by Cody Simpson and Cisco Adler except where noted.

No.	Title	Writer(s)	Length
1.	"Free"	Simpson, Bob DiPiero, Fancy Hagood, Andrew DeRoberts	4:53
2.	"Driftwood"		3:43
3.	"New Problems"		3:42
4.	"Flower"	Simpson, Branson Stefanson, Adler	3:00
5.	"Thotful"		4:09
6.	"I'm Your Friend"		3:38
7.	"It Don't Matter" (featuring Donavon Frankenreiter)	Donavon Frankenreiter	2:59
8.	"ABC"		3:06
9.	"Livin' Easy"	Simpson, Cary Barlowe, Ian Keaggy, Adler	3:27
10.	"Wilderness"		2:31
11.	"Palm of Your Hand"		2:46
12.	"Love Yourself" (featuring G. Love)	Simpson, Garrett Dutton, Adler	4:25
13.	"Happy Lil' Hippie"		3:29
14.	"Still Smiling"		3:16

== Charts ==
Chart (2015)	Peak position
Australian Albums (ARIA)	74
Belgian Albums (Ultratop Flanders)	82
Canadian Albums (Billboard)	23
Dutch Albums (Album Top 100)	81
US Billboard 200	128
US Folk Albums (Billboard)	4
US Top Rock Albums (Billboard)	16
