= El Rey (Tito Puente album) =

Studio album by Tito Puente
- Released: 1984
- Genre: Latin jazz

Tito Puente chronology
Cha Cha With Tito Puente at Grossinger's (1960)	El Rey (1984)	Percussion's King (1997)

El Rey is a 1984 Latin jazz album on the Concord Picante label by musician, band and orchestra leader, Tito Puente. Puente's move towards jazz came at the same time as Eddie Palmieri's albums. It includes performances by Tito Puente not only on timbales, but on vibraharp playing a medley of "Stella by Starlight" and "(Tu, Mi) Delirio", as well as "Autumn Leaves" and "Rainfall". There are also excellent, inventive, driving performances of two works by John Coltrane: "Giant Steps" and "Equinox", as well as Puente's own hit songs "Oye Como Va" and "Linda Chicana".

== Personnel ==
The 9-piece band includes: Tito Puente on timbales, vibes, and vocals; Johnny "Dandy" Rodriguez on bongos, congas, and vocals; Jose Madera on congas and timbales; Francisco Aguabella on congas; Ray Gonzales on trumpet and flugelhorn; Mario Rivera on flute, soprano, and tenor saxophone; Jimmy Frisaura on valve trombone; Jorge Dalto on acoustical and electric piano, and Bobby Rodriguez on bass.

All arrangements are by Tito Puente, with the exception of "Giant Steps," which was arranged by Jorge Dalto. Puente produced the album.

== Track listing ==
1. Oye Como Va - a new version of the 1963 hit
2. Autumn Leaves
3. Ran Kan Kan
4. Rainfall
5. Giant Steps
6. Linda Chicana
7. Stella By Starlight / Delirio
8. Equinox
9. El Rey del Timbal
