= Coast to Coast (Cody Simpson EP) =

EP by Cody Simpson
- Released: 20 September 2011
- Recorded: 2010–2011
- Length: 25:48
- Label: Atlantic

Cody Simpson chronology
4 U (2010)	Coast to Coast (2011)	Paradise (2012)

Singles from Coast to Coast
- 1. "On My Mind" Released: 23 April 2011; 2. "Not Just You" Released: 16 September 2011; 3. "Angel" Released: 16 December 2011

Coast to Coast is the second EP by Australian pop singer Cody Simpson. It was released on 20 September 2011 by Atlantic Records.

== Singles ==
"On My Mind" is the first single to be released from this EP. The song was written by Julie Frost, Fraser T Smith, Mike Caren and Nasri. It was released on 23 April 2011. It was released on iTunes 23 May 2011. The song was written by Nasri, Julie Frost, Fraser T Smith, and Mike Caren. The song is composed in a key of E major and sampled from a 1986 song, "Your Love", by The Outfield. Simpson performed "On My Mind" on CBS's The Early Show on 4 June 2011. Simpson also performed the song on Justin Bieber's "Believe Tour". The song reached #32 on the U.S. Social Chart. The music video was released on 17 June 2011.

"Not Just You" is the second single taken from this EP, released on 16 September 2011. The music video for "Not Just You" was released on 11 October 2011, directed by Roman White. The video was filmed on Venice Beach, and in downtown L.A. "Angel" is the third single from the album. It was released on 16 December 2011, and the music video was directed by Cody Simpson and Matt Graham. "Not Just You" was originally written and sung by Nasri Atweh back in 2009. Simpson made a cover of the song and its lyric video was uploaded to YouTube on 16 September. On 21 September 2011, "Not Just You" was the #1 free single on iTunes. On 11 October, a music video for the song was released on Simpson's YouTube channel.

== Music video ==
The video for "On My Mind" was released on 17 June 2011, directed by Travis Kopach and featuring dancer/actress Hailey Baldwin, wife of Justin Bieber. The video is based on Simpson finding a picture of a girl (Hailey) in the mall and searching the mall for her. Towards the end, he plays a video throughout the mall asking that girl to meet him at a theater. In the last scene, you see the girl come up behind him at the theater, take a picture of him, and walk into the theater together, both of their photos next to each other on the ground.

The video for "Not Just You" was filmed on 17 September 2011, with Roman White. The video was filmed on Venice Beach, and in downtown L.A. The video was directed by Roman White. Madison McMillin co-stars in the video. The video premiered on 11 October on MTV and MTV.com.

== Track listing ==
Coast to Coast – Standard edition
No.	Title	Writer(s)	Producer(s)	Length
1.	"Good as It Gets"	Nathaniel Hills, Kevin Cossom, Marcella Araica	Danja	3:45
2.	"Crazy but True"	Nathaniel Hills, Kevin Cossom, Marcella Araica	Danja	3:57
3.	"On My Mind"	Julie Frost, Fraser T Smith, Mike Caren, Nasri	Fraser T Smith	3:12
4.	"Not Just You"	Nasri, Adam Messinger	The Messengers	4:17
5.	"All Day"	Cody Simpson, Krys Ivory, Edwin "Lil' Eddie" Serrano	Shawn Campbell	3:07
6.	"Angel"	Simpson, Nasri, Adam Messinger	The Messengers	3:40

Coast to Coast – iTunes Store edition (bonus tracks)
No.	Title	Writer(s)	Producer(s)	Length
7.	"iYiYi" (featuring Flo Rida)	Cody Simpson, Smee, Colby O'Donis, Bei Maejor, Tramar Dillard, Michael White, Terrence Battle, Jerome Armstrong	DJ Frank E	3:55
8.	"On My Mind" (music video)

Coast to Coast – Target edition (bonus tracks)
No.	Title	Writer(s)	Length
7.	"Crash"	Edwin "Lil' Eddie" Serrano, Simpson	3:31
8.	"Ends with You"	Alex Dezen, Sam Hook	2:45

Coast to Coast – Digital expanded edition (bonus tracks)
No.	Title	Length
9.	"Guitar Cry"	3:15
10.	"Love"	2:25
11.	"All Day" (acoustic)	3:15
12.	"On My Mind" (Karsten Delgado and Mani Myles Mix)	3:26

Coast to Coast – Japan edition (bonus tracks)
No.	Title	Writer(s)	Producer(s)	Length
7.	"Round of Applause"	Cody Simpson	Shawn Campbell	3:31
8.	"iYiYi" (featuring Flo Rida)	Cody Simpson, Smee, Colby O'Donis, Bei Maejor, Tramar Dillard, Michael White, Terrence Battle, Jerome Armstrong	DJ Frank E	3:55
9.	"Don't Cry Your Heart Out"	Lucas Secon, Wayne Hector, Maiman	Lucas Secon	3:49
10.	"Summertime"			3:52
11.	"iYiYi" (Acoustic)	Cody Simpson, Colby O'Donis, Bei Maejor, Tramar Dillard	DJ Frank E	3:14
12.	"On My Mind" (Karsten Delgado and Mani Myles Mix)	Julie Frost, Fraser T Smith, Mike Caren, Nasri		3:26

Coast to Coast – Australia edition
No.	Title	Writer(s)	Producer(s)	Length
1.	"On My Mind"	Julie Frost, Fraser T Smith, Mike Caren, Nasri	Fraser T Smith	3:12
2.	"Good as It Gets"	Nathaniel Hills, Kevin Cossom, Marcella Araica	Danja	3:45
3.	"All Day"	Simpson, Krys Ivory, Edwin "Lil' Eddie" Serrano	Shawn Campbell	3:07
4.	"Angel"	Simpson, Nasri, Adam Messinger	The Messengers	3:40
5.	"Crash"	Edwin "Lil Eddie" Serrano, Simpson	Shawn Campbell	3:31
6.	"Crazy but True"	Nathaniel Hills, Kevin Cossom, Marcella Araica	Danja	3:57
7.	"Not Just You"	Nasri, Adam Messinger	The Messengers	4:17
8.	"On My Mind" (Karsten Delgado and Mani Myles Mix)	Julie Frost, Fraser T Smith, Mike Caren, Nasri		3:26

== Commercial performance ==
In the United States, the EP debuted at number 12 on the Billboard 200 chart with 24,000 copies sold in its first week. In Australia, the album debuted at number 26 on the Australian Albums Chart and rose to number 16 the following week.

On the week ending 27 August 2011, "On My Mind" debuted at number 39 on the US Pop Songs chart.

Album	Peak position
Australian Albums Chart	16
US Billboard 200	12

Chart performance for "On My Mind"
Chart (2011)	Peak position
Australia (ARIA)	51
US Mainstream Top 40 (Billboard)	39
