= I've Been Waiting for You =

I've Been Waiting for You can refer to:

- "I've Been Waiting for You" (Neil Young song), a song by Neil Young, later covered by Pixies and David Bowie
- "I've Been Waiting for You" (ABBA song), a song recorded in 1974 by Swedish pop group ABBA
- "I've Been Waiting for You", a 1990 song by Guys Next Door
- "I've Been Waiting for You", a song by Dannii Minogue from Club Disco
- I've Been Waiting for You (film), a 1998 film
