= All Day (Cody Simpson song) =

Single by Cody Simpson

from the EP 4 U and Coast to Coast
- Released: 17 March 2011
- Recorded: 2010
- Length: 3:07
- Label: Atlantic
- Songwriters: Lil' Eddie; Krys Ivory
- Producer: Shawn Campbell

Cody Simpson singles chronology
"iYiYi" (2010)	"All Day" (2011)	"On My Mind" (2011)

Music video
- "All Day" on YouTube

"All Day" is a song by Australian singer Cody Simpson. The song was written by Lil' Eddie and Krys Ivory, and was produced by Shawn Campbell.

All Day was originally featured on Simpson's debut EPs, 4 U and Coast to Coast.

== Performances ==
Cody performed at the Y100 Jingle Ball Village Concert in Ft. Lauderdale, Florida on 11 December 2010 and played "All Day." Cody also performed this song on the first episode of So Random on Disney Channel. In 2012 he performed "All Day" on Justin Bieber's Believe Tour.

== Music video ==
=== Development and release ===
The video was shot in January 2011. The video was released on 23 February 2011 on AOL Music. The video was directed by David Ovenshire with organization facilitated by Trevor Durham. It features cameo appearances by Jessica Jarrell, Aaron Fresh, Jacque Rae, Madison Pettis and his sister, Alli Simpson.

Pictures show Simpson and his friends dancing in the rain.

In August 2014, the "All Day" Music Video was set to private on YouTube following Cody Simpson's departure from Warner Music Group and Atlantic Records. However, as of 2022 the music video has been set back to public view.

=== Synopsis ===
The video, which features a love interest played by Yasmin Baildon, is about a girl Simpson wants to make his girlfriend. In the beginning of the video, Cody is seen walking towards Baildon, but is woken up by the alarm on his iPhone, revealing it was a dream. As he is walking downstairs he sees an image of Baildon, but it is a hallucination. He jumps in the car with a friend and goes to a concert rehearsal. He is dancing to the original choreography on the video. He then sees Balidon and runs after her, but she has driven off with her friend. He then imagines what life would be like with her, with them jumping into a pool at the end of his fantasy. He is seen dancing in the rain with many people. After, Simpson's love interest shows up at what seems to be a party. They reach out for each other's hand and the music video comes to an end.

== Charts ==
Weekly chart performance for "All Day"
Chart (2011)	Peak position
Australia (ARIA)	97
Belgium (Ultratop 50 Flanders)	19
Canada Hot 100 (Billboard)	79
US Bubbling Under Hot 100 (Billboard)	22

== Certifications ==
Certifications for "All Day"
Region	Certification	Certified units/sales
Canada (Music Canada)	Gold	40,000^{*}
^{*} Sales figures based on certification alone.

== Release history ==
Release history and formats for "All Day"
Country	Date	Format	Label
Various	17 March 2011	Digital download	Atlantic
