= 4 U (Cody Simpson EP) =

EP by Cody Simpson
- Released: 21 December 2010
- Recorded: 2010
- Length: 17:38
- Label: Atlantic
- Producer: Lucas Secon; DJ Frank E; Shawn Campbell

Cody Simpson chronology
4 U (2010)	Coast to Coast (2011)

Singles from 4 U
- 1. "iYiYi" Released: 1 June 2010; 2. "All Day" Released: 17 March 2011

4 U is the debut extended play (EP) release by Australian pop singer Cody Simpson. It was released on 21 December 2010 via Atlantic Records.

The album's lead single, "iYiYi", was released on 1 June 2010. The second single, "All Day", was released on 17 March 2011.

== Background ==
Simpson moved to Los Angeles in June 2010 to record his songs with Atlantic Records and his producer Campbell. On 4 December 2010, it was announced on Simpson's official website that an EP entitled 4 U would be released through iTunes on 21 December 2010. The EP includes 5 tracks in total, 4 of them being previously unreleased.

== Tour ==
Simpson went on tour promoting 4U, making stops at various locations in the United States. Most notably, Simpson participated in the "Camplified 2010" tour in June. Other tours include a middle school tour that took place from October–November 2010 and covered 9 U.S States. From 9 April 2011 to 18 May 2011 he and Greyson Chance took part in the Waiting 4U Tour. It started in Ivins, Utah and ended in Portland, Oregon.

== Singles ==
"iYiYi" is the first single that was released for digital download on 1 June 2010 via iTunes. It features American rapper Flo Rida. The music video for "iYiYi" was released on 30 June 2010. The song peaked at no.19 in Australia and no.29 in New Zealand in 2011. The song also peaked at no.33 in Belgium in 2011.

"All Day" was released as the second single on 17 March 2011. The video was shot in January 2011. The video was released on 23 February 2011 at 10am EST on AOL Music. The "All Day" music video was directed by David Ovenshire. It features cameo appearances by Jessica Jarrell, Aaron Fresh, Jacque Rae, and Madison Pettis. The song peaked at no. 47 in Belgium.

== Track listing ==
No.	Title	Writer(s)	Producer(s)	Length
1.	"Round of Applause"	Cody Simpson	Shawn Campbell	3:31
2.	"iYiYi" (featuring Flo Rida)	Cody Simpson, Smee, Colby O'Donis, Bei Maejor, Tramar Dillard, Michael White, Terrence Battle, Jerome Armstrong	DJ Frank E	3:55
3.	"All Day"	Cody Simpson, Krys Ivory, Edwin "Lil' Eddie" Serrano	Shawn Campbell	3:07
4.	"Don't Cry Your Heart Out"	Lucas Secon, Wayne Hector, Maiman	Lucas Secon	3:49
5.	"iYiYi" (Acoustic)	Cody Simpson, Colby O'Donis, Bei Maejor, Tramar Dillard	DJ Frank E	3:14

== Charts ==
Chart (2009)	Peak position
US Top Heatseekers	4
