= Pretty Brown Eyes =

Single by Cody Simpson

from the album Surfers Paradise
- Released: 23 April 2013
- Recorded: 2012
- Genre: Pop
- Length: 2:48
- Label: Atlantic
- Songwriter(s): Cody Simpson; Timothy Thomas; Theron Thomas; Vasquez Castillo

Cody Simpson singles chronology
"They Don't Know About Us" (2012)	"Pretty Brown Eyes" (2013)	"Summertime of Our Lives" (2013)

"Pretty Brown Eyes" is a song by Australian singer Cody Simpson. It is the lead single from his second studio album, Surfers Paradise (July 2013). It was released ahead of the album on 23 April, as a digital download in Australia. The song reached the top 100 on the Canadian, Irish and United Kingdom's singles charts. It was co-written by Simpson with songwriting duo, Timothy and Theron Thomas (brothers from Planet VI or Rock City) and Vasquez Castillo.

== Music video ==
A music video to accompany the release of "Pretty Brown Eyes" was first released onto YouTube on 22 April 2013, however the link was deleted or moved to private section, since August 2014. The music video is now back online.

== Charts ==
Chart performance for "Pretty Brown Eyes"
Chart (2013)	Peak position
Australia (ARIA)	90
Canada (Canadian Hot 100)	61
Ireland (IRMA)	75
UK Singles (OCC)	61
US Bubbling Under Hot 100 (Billboard)	8
US Digital Song Sales (Billboard)	68
US Pop Airplay (Billboard)	33

== Certifications ==
Certifications for "Pretty Brown Eyes"
Region	Certification	Certified units/sales
Canada (Music Canada)	Gold	40,000^{*}
New Zealand (RMNZ)	Gold	15,000^{‡}
United States (RIAA)	Gold	500,000^{‡}
^{*} Sales figures based on certification alone.^{‡} Sales+streaming figures based on certification alone.

== Release history ==
Release history and formats for "Pretty Brown Eyes"
Region	Date	Format	Label
Australia	23 April 2013	Digital download	Atlantic Records
United Kingdom	23 April 2013	Digital download	Atlantic Records
