= Waiting 4U Tour =

2011 concert tour by Cody Simpson and Greyson Chance

- Tour by Cody Simpson and Greyson Chance
- Location: North America
- Associated album: 4 U Hold On 'til the Night
- Start date: April 9, 2011
- End date: May 18, 2011
- Legs: 1
- No. of shows: 28
Cody Simpson tour chronology
Waiting 4U Tour (2011)	Coast to Coast Mall Tour (2011)
Greyson Chance tour chronology
Waiting 4U Tour (2011)	Asian Promo Tour (2011)

Waiting 4U Tour was a co-headlining concert tour by Australian singer Cody Simpson and American singer Greyson Chance. The tour was launched to promote Simpson's debut EP 4 U (2010) and to generate interest in and publicity for Greyson Chance. Both singers revealed the announcement of the tour on March 10, 2011 during a live chat with fans on Ustream.

== Opening act ==
- Camryn (select dates)
- Michael and Marisa (select dates)
- Shane Harper (select dates)
- Lily Halpern (select dates)

== Tour dates ==
List of 2011 concerts
Date	City	Country	Venue
April 9, 2011	St. George	United States	Dixie Center Ballroom
April 11, 2011	Englewood	United States	Gothic Theatre
April 13, 2011	Minneapolis	United States	First Avenue
April 14, 2011	St. Louis	United States	Pageant Concert NightClub
April 15, 2011	Chicago	United States	House of Blues
April 16, 2011	Milwaukee	United States	The Rave
April 17, 2011	Royal Oak	United States	Royal Oak Music Theatre
April 19, 2011	Cleveland	United States	House of Blues
April 20, 2011	Lancaster	United States	The Chameleon Club
April 21, 2011	Westbury	United States	NYCB Theatre at Westbury
April 22, 2011	Hampton Beach	United States	Hampton Beach Casino Ballroom
April 23, 2011	Foxborough	United States	Showcase Live
April 25, 2011	West Chester	United States	The Note
April 26, 2011	New York City	United States	Irving Plaza
April 27, 2011	New York City	United States	Gramercy Theatre
April 28, 2011	Washington, D.C.	United States	Sixth & I Historic Synagogue
May 1, 2011	Fort Lauderdale	United States	Culture Room
May 3, 2011	Lake Buena Vista	United States	House of Blues
May 4, 2011	Atlanta	United States	Center Stage Theater
May 6, 2011	Houston	United States	Bronze Peacock Room
May 8, 2011	Dallas	United States	Cambridge Room
May 10, 2011	Mesa	United States	Nile Theater
May 11, 2011	West Hollywood	United States	House of Blues
May 14, 2011	Anaheim	United States	House of Blues
May 15, 2011	San Francisco	United States	Great American Music Hall
May 17, 2011	Seattle	United States	Showbox at the Market
May 18, 2011	Portland	United States	Roseland Theater

Cancellations and rescheduled shows

April 11, 2011	Ivins, Utah	Tuacahn Amphitheatre and Center for the Arts	Moved to the Dixie Center Ballroom in St. George, Utah
April 13, 2011	Minneapolis, Minnesota	The Cedar Cultural Center	Moved to First Avenue
April 26, 2011	New York City, New York	Gramercy Theatre	Moved to Irving Plaza
May 15, 2011	San Francisco, California	Slim's	Moved to the Great American Music Hall
