= Wish U Were Here =

Single by Cody Simpson featuring Becky G

from the album Paradise
- Released: 7 August 2012
- Recorded: 2012
- Studio: The Ox (North Hollywood, CA)
- Genre: Dance-pop; Teen pop; Pop rap
- Length: 3:16
- Label: Atlantic
- Songwriter(s): Taio Cruz; Lukasz Gottwald; Bonnie McKee; Henry Russell Walter; Rebbeca Marie Gomez
- Producer(s): Cirkut; Dr. Luke

Cody Simpson singles chronology
| "Got Me Good" (2012) | "Wish U Were Here" (2012) | "They Don't Know About Us" (2012) |

Becky G singles chronology
| "Problem" (2012) | "Wish U Were Here" (2012) | "Oath" (2012) |

Music video
- "Wish U Were Here" on YouTube

"Wish U Were Here" is a song by Australian singer Cody Simpson, featuring vocals from American singer and rapper Becky G. The song was released on 7 August 2012, as the second single from Simpson's debut studio album Paradise (2012). The song was written by Taio Cruz, Bonnie McKee, Becky G, and its producers Dr. Luke and Cirkut.

== Music video ==
A music video to accompany the release of "Wish U Were Here" was first released onto YouTube alongside the song, with a total length of three minutes and 28 seconds. The video was directed by Cameron Duddy, who also directed Simpson's video for "Got Me Good", another song featured on Paradise.

== Track listing ==
Digital download
| No. | Title | Length |
|---|---|---|
| 1. | "Wish 'U Were Here" (feat. Becky G) | 3:16 |

Digital download - Remixes
| No. | Title | Length |
|---|---|---|
| 1. | "Wish U Were Here" (Sam Thomasson Radio Edit) | 3:07 |
| 2. | "Wish U Were Here" (Digi Radio Edit) | 2:52 |
| 3. | "Wish U Were Here" (DJ Laszlo Radio Edit) | 4:09 |

== Charts ==
Chart performance for "Wish U Were Here"
| Chart (2013) | Peak position |
|---|---|
| Belgium (Ultratip Bubbling Under Flanders) | 10 |
| Belgium (Ultratip Bubbling Under Wallonia) | 28 |
| Ireland (IRMA) | 99 |

== Release history ==
Release history and formats for "Wish U Were Here"
| Region | Date | Format | Label |
|---|---|---|---|
| Australia | 7 August 2012 | Digital download | Atlantic |
| United Kingdom | 14 August 2012 | Digital download | Atlantic |
