= IYiYi =

"iYiYi"

Single by Cody Simpson featuring Flo Rida and DJ Frank E

from the EP 4 U
- B-side: "Summertime"
- Released: 1 June 2010
- Recorded: 2010
- Genre: Teen pop; R&B
- Length: 3:55
- Label: Poe Boy; Warner; Atlantic
- Songwriters: Cody Simpson; Colby O'Donis; Bei Maejor; Tramar Dillard; Justin Franks
- Producer: DJ Frank E

Cody Simpson singles chronology
"iYiYi" (2010)	"All Day" (2011)

Flo Rida singles chronology
"Club Can't Handle Me" (2010)	"iYiYi" (2010)	"You Make the Rain Fall" (2010)

DJ Frank E singles chronology
"Summertime" (2010)	"iYiYi" (2010)	"Superbad (11:34)" (2010)

Music video
- "iYiYi" on YouTube

"iYiYi" (/aɪjaɪjaɪ/) is the debut single by Australian singer Cody Simpson featuring American rapper Flo Rida. It is the lead single from Simpson's 2010 debut extended play, 4 U. It was written by the artists alongside Colby O'Donis, Bei Maejor, and producer DJ Frank E. It was released digitally worldwide on 1 June 2010.

It was one of the songs featured in the interactive role-playing adventure video game The Sims 3.

== Performances ==
Simpson performed "IYiYi" at the 2010 Australian Kids' Choice Awards as the closing act.

== Chart performance ==
iYiYi has been listed for 19 weeks in 3 different charts. Its first appearance was week 24/2010 in the Australia Singles Top 50 and the last appearance was week 13/2011 in the Canada Singles Top 100. Its peak position was number 19, on the Australia Singles Top 50, it stayed there for 2 weeks. Its highest entry was number 25 in the Australia Singles Top 50.

== Music video ==
The music video for "iYiYi" was released on 30 June 2010. It was filmed in Simpson's hometown, the Gold Coast, Queensland in Australia.

== Formats and track listings ==
Deluxe single

1. "iYiYi" (featuring. Flo Rida)
2. "iYiYi" (Acoustic Version)
3. "Summertime"

== Charts ==
Chart (2010)	Peak position
Australia (ARIA)	19
New Zealand (Recorded Music NZ)	29
US Bubbling Under Hot 100 (Billboard)	12

Chart (2011)	Peak position
Belgium (Ultratip Bubbling Under Flanders)	33
Canada Hot 100 (Billboard)	73

== Certifications ==
Region	Certification	Certified units/sales
Australia (ARIA)	Gold	35,000^{^}
Canada (Music Canada)	Gold	40,000^{*}
^{*} Sales figures based on certification alone.^{^} Shipments figures based on certification alone.

== Release history ==
Country	Date	Format	Label
Australia	1 June 2010	Digital download	Atlantic Records
New Zealand	1 June 2010	Digital download	Atlantic Records
United States	1 June 2010	Digital download	Atlantic Records
Germany	29 April 2011	CD single	Atlantic Records
