= Cody Simpson =

Australian singer and swimmer (born 1997)

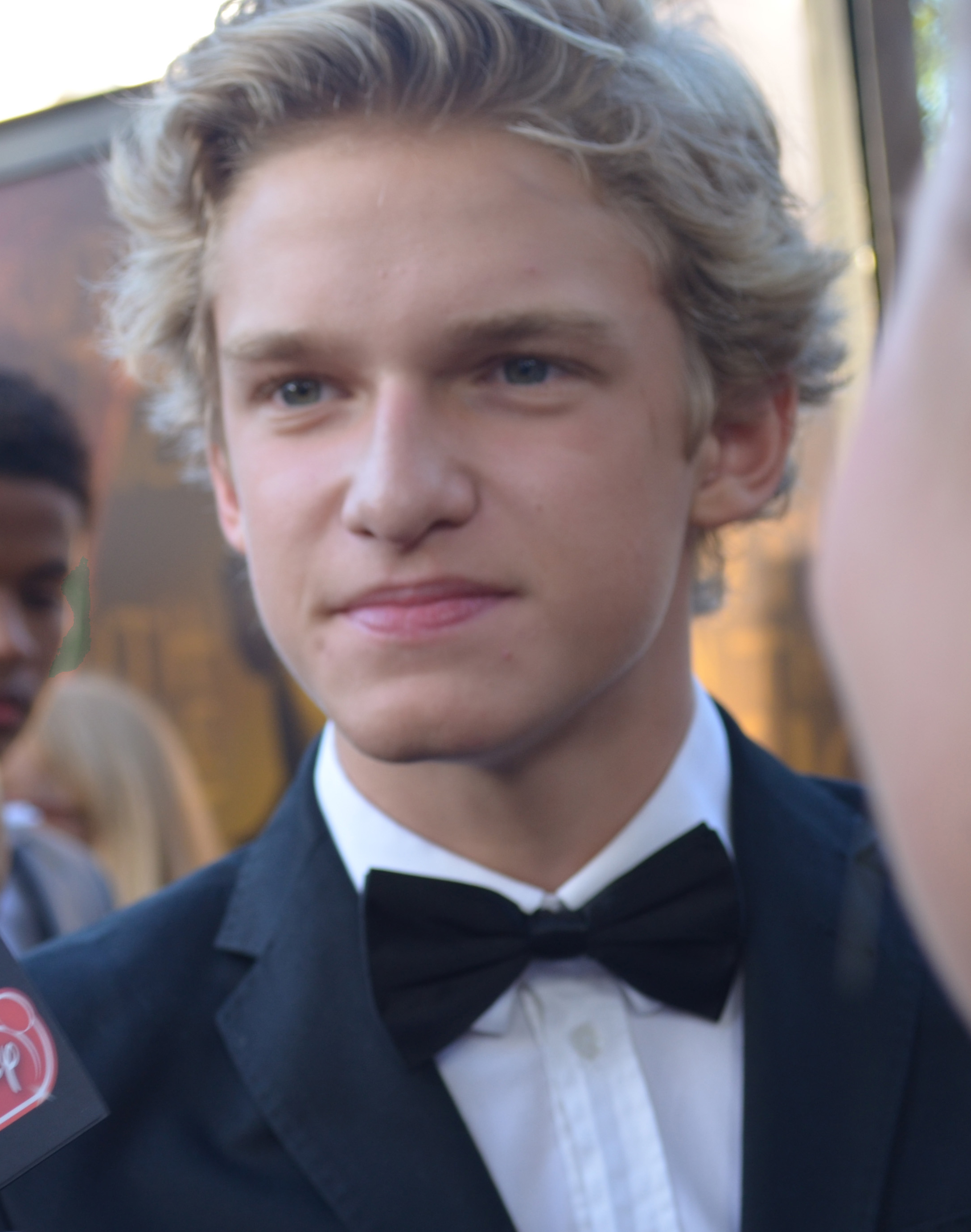
- Simpson in 2012

Background information
- Born: Cody Robert Simpson; 11 January 1997 (age 29); Gold Coast, Queensland, Australia
- Genres: Pop; R&B
- Occupations: Singer; songwriter; swimmer; model; media personality
- Instruments: Vocals; guitar
- Years active: 2009–present
- Labels: Atlantic; Coast House; Bananabeat; Entertainment One U.S. LP; BMG
- Website: codysimpson.com
- Sports career
- Sport: Swimming
- Strokes: Butterfly
- Club: Griffith Swim Team
- Coach: Michael Bohl
Medal record
Men's swimming
Representing Australia
Commonwealth Games
Gold medal – first place	2022 Birmingham	4×100 metre freestyle
Silver medal – second place	2022 Birmingham	4×100 m medley

Cody Robert Simpson (born 11 January 1997) is an Australian singer, actor, and a former competitive swimmer. Since his debut as a recording artist, he has released four solo studio albums: Paradise (2012), Surfers Paradise (2013), Free (2015), and a self-titled album (2022), with another album currently in the works to be released in 2026. He portrayed the lead role of Dmitry in the Broadway musical Anastasia from November 2018 through April 2019. The same year, he won the first season of The Masked Singer Australia as "Robot".

In 2022, Simpson joined the Australian Swim Team after qualifying for the Commonwealth Games during Australia's team trials. In June 2024, he retired from competitive swimming after failing to qualify for Paris Olympics.

== Early life ==
Cody Simpson was born on 11 January 1997 in Benowa, a suburb on the Gold Coast, Queensland, to parents Brad Simpson and Angie Simpson. He has two younger siblings, Alli and Tom. Growing up, Simpson attended All Saints Anglican School. In 2009, Simpson began uploading songs to YouTube, performing covers of Jason Mraz's "I'm Yours","Cry Me a River" by Justin Timberlake, "I Want You Back" by The Jackson 5 and Bon Jovi's "Wanted Dead or Alive".

== Career ==
=== Music career ===
==== 2009–2011: Career beginnings, 4 U, and Coast to Coast ====
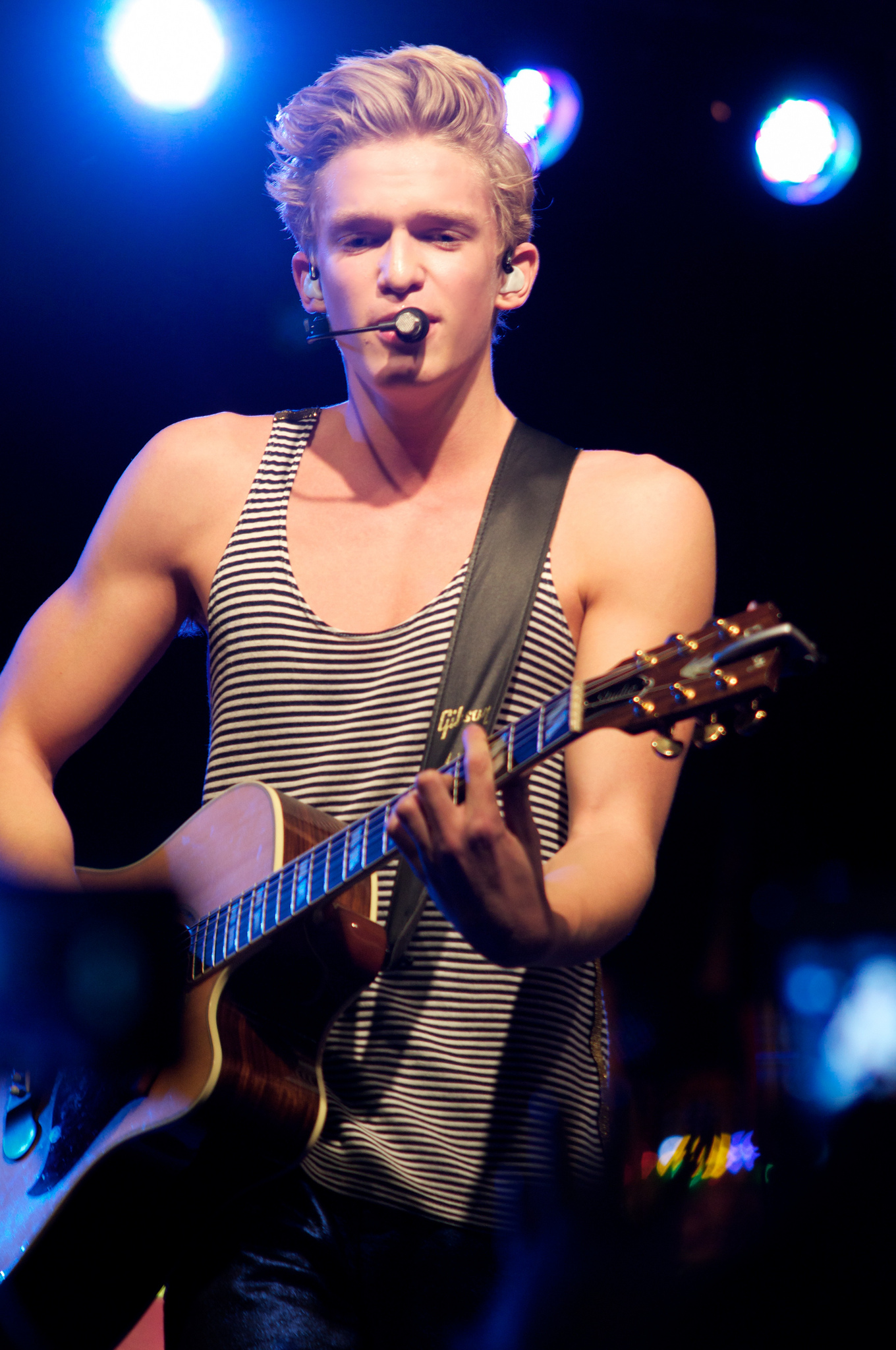
Simpson performing at the Nevada Wild Fest outside the Rio in Las Vegas, Nevada 25 October 2012.

Simpson's rise to recognition was featured on The 7.30 Report in December 2009. He released his debut single, "iYiYi" (which features American rapper Flo Rida), on 15 May 2010. The music video for Simpson's second single, "Summertime", was released on 20 September 2010. Simpson relocated to Los Angeles in June 2010 with his family to record music with Atlantic Records' Shawn Campbell. That same month, Simpson appeared on the Australian morning show Sunrise. On 22 June 2010, it was announced that Simpson would participate in the Camplified 2010 Tour, along with other artists, touring across the United States. The tour began on 5 July 2010 and ended on 14 August 2010. Other tours that year included a middle school tour that took place from October - November 2010 and covered nine US states. An EP, 4 U was released on 21 December 2010. The EP included five tracks in total, four of them being previously unreleased. Simpson recorded a remake of the song "I Want Candy" by The Strangeloves as the main theme song for the Easter-themed live-action/animated film Hop. In May 2011, Simpson was "egged" during a live performance at Westfield Miranda in Sydney. Simpson told Australian radio show The Kyle & Jackie O Show that he was not in fact hit by the eggs, and that he was upset on behalf of his fans as the remainder of his show was cancelled due to security concerns. He then started the Waiting 4U tour with American singer Greyson Chance on 9 April in Ivins, Utah. The tour ended on 18 May 2011, in Portland, Oregon.

Coast to Coast was released on 20 September 2011 by Atlantic Records. It reached number 12 on the Billboard 200 and sold 24,000 copies. On 23 April 2011, Simpson released the single "On My Mind". On 5 August 2011, he performed on The Today Show. The following day, Simpson started his Coast to Coast Mall Tour in Lake Grove, New York to promote his second EP. He played nine dates around the United States and finished it in Orange, California on 18 September 2011. On 22 September 2011, it was announced that Scooter Braun, Justin Bieber's manager, had become Simpson's manager.

==== 2012–2014: Paradise, Surfers Paradise, and Dancing with the Stars ====
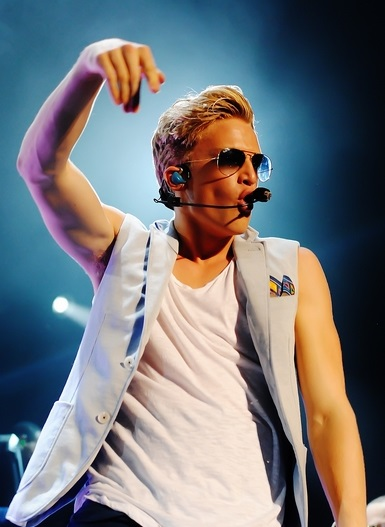
Simpson performing in Montreal in 2013

On 12 June 2012, Simpson released an EP titled Preview to Paradise containing four songs from his upcoming debut studio album, Paradise, which was released on 2 October 2012. In February 2013, Simpson toured Europe, doing his own tour dates as well as supporting Justin Bieber on many of the European Believe Tour dates. Surfers Paradise, which was released on 16 July 2013, was Simpson's first album to debut in the top 10 of the Billboard 200. During the summer of 2013, Simpson headlined the Paradise Tour, featuring opening acts Ryan Beatty and Before You Exit. On 19 November 2013, Simpson released an acoustic album called The Acoustic Sessions, featuring the songs "Pretty Brown Eyes", "All Day", "La Da Dee", "Wish U Were Here", and a cover of "Please Come Home for Christmas".

On 4 March 2014, Simpson was announced as one of the celebrities to participate on the 18th season of Dancing with the Stars during ABC's Good Morning America. He was partnered with professional dancer Witney Carson. He was eliminated on Week 5 of the competition and finished in ninth place.

From 30 June 2014 to 14 July 2014, Simpson did an acoustic tour through Europe with singer Jackson Harris.

In August 2014, Simpson announced he had departed Warner/Atlantic, citing creative differences.

==== 2015–2018: Free, Cody Simpson and the Tide, and Wave One ====
Simpson's album Free was scheduled to be released on 23 June 2015 then was pushed back to 10 July. Simpson performed the first single, "Flower" on Good Morning America on 6 February 2015. It was his first album as an independent artist since leaving Atlantic Records to create his own label, Coast House. The album was produced by Cisco Adler and includes songwriting collaborations with G. Love and Donavon Frankenreiter. John Mayer served as a sounding board. Simpson performed his single "New Problems" on NBC's Today show on 13 July 2015. On 1 November 2015, it was reported that Simpson was taking a break from his solo career to start a band with his friends.

In 2017, Simpson formed a new band called Cody Simpson and the Tide. The band was composed of Simpson on vocals and guitar, Adrian Cota on drums, and Shareef "Reef" Addo on bass. Cody Simpson and the Tide released their debut EP, entitled Wave One, in the fall of 2017. The music was a blend of pop, rock, blues, and surf-rock genres. In their four-track EP, Simpson sings of love, unity, environmentalism and ocean conservation. The EP's debut single, "Waiting for the Tide", was inspired by a poem Simpson wrote that tackled topics such as rising water levels and ocean conservation. In August 2018, the band released another song, titled "Underwater". In October 2018, Cody Simpson and the Tide went on a short tour of southern California to perform their EP. The band split up in early 2019.

==== 2019–present: Return to solo work ====
In October 2019, Simpson released the song "Golden Thing", which was inspired by his then-girlfriend, Miley Cyrus. In the same year, he participated on The Masked Singer Australia as the "Robot" and went on to win the show. In April 2022, Simpson released a self-titled album, his first in six years, which he had recorded during a swimming training break in 2020. Simpson also released music videos for singles "Nice To Meet You", and "Let Go" on YouTube and Spotify.

In November 2022, Simpson performed the Australian National Anthem at the Lexus Melbourne Cup and the AFL Women's Grand Final. He performed a rendition of the Nat King Cole song "The Christmas Song" at the 85th annual Carols by Candlelight held in Melbourne in December 2022.

In February 2026, Simpson announced his return to music, teasing a new song in promotional content on his social media pages.

In March 2026, Simpson announced his new album "spring" though no release date has been revealed yet. However, in an interview with Paul C. Brunson of the We Need To Talk podcast, Simpson revealed he'd only recently settled the final payment to Atlantic Records for the cash advances given to him during his early career.

In an interview with Chris Eggertsen of Billboard, Simpson announced he’d signed a new record deal with BMG, and revealed the first set of singles from his forthcoming album, titled "Baby Blue" and "When It Comes To Loving You"

=== Acting career ===
In 2014, Simpson made his television debut guest starring as himself in the sitcom Instant Mom. In 2015, he guest starred on the American television sitcom Cougar Town, portraying Pete, a high school student. In the same year, he starred as himself in the Nickelodeon film One Crazy Cruise. In late 2017, Simpson was cast in a supporting role in Bret Easton Ellis' thriller film, Smiley Face Killers, opposite actor Crispin Glover. In October 2018, Simpson made his Broadway musical debut when he was cast as male lead Dmitry in Anastasia, alongside John Bolton and Christy Altomare.

=== Swimming career (2019–2024) ===
==== Junior swimming ====
Simpson was a talented swimmer from an early age. He trained at the Miami Swimming Club under coach Ken Nixon and won two gold medals at the 2009 Queensland Swimming Championships.

==== Return to swimming ====
In 2019, Simpson turned his focus back to competitive swimming, joining the University of Southern California's Trojan Swim Elite team under coach Dave Salo. In October 2019, Simpson, who was competing at his first meet in nearly a decade, finished the 100 yard butterfly in 24th position out of 29 entrants with a time of 51.51. To improve his swimming technique, he trained under different coaches including two-time Olympian Brett Hawke. In December 2020, Simpson shared on social media that he had qualified for the Australian Olympic trials in the 100 metre butterfly, after having raced a time of 54.90.

Simpson starred in swimming documentary Head Above Water, which highlighted his return to swimming and was released 4 June 2021 on Amazon Prime Video.

In February 2023, Simpson alongside Griffith University Swimming Club teammates Mack Horton, Bowen Gough, and Josh Edwards-Smith, competed in the Rottnest Channel Swim finishing first in a time of 3:33:49 and setting a new team record.

==== 2021 Australian Swimming Trials ====
Simpson continued to show improvement in the lead up to the 2021 Australian Swimming Trials which took place in Adelaide, South Australia in June 2021. At the meet, Simpson swam a personal best time of 50.22 in the 100 metre freestyle, however failed to advance through to the finals. In the 100 metre butterfly, Simpson swam a time of 52.84 in the preliminary heats to qualify sixth and advance through to the final. In the final, Simpson failed to qualify for the Tokyo Olympics after finishing in eighth place with a time of 52.94.

Shortly after the trials, Simpson announced he had been training under coach Michael Bohl at Griffith University, having moved back to Australia in the lead up to the trials.

==== 2022 Australian Swimming Championships ====
Simpson participated in the Australian Swimming Championships which took place in Adelaide, South Australia in May 2022. In the 100 metre butterfly, Simpson advanced through to the finals after qualifying second in the preliminary heats with a time of 51.79. In the final, he swam a 51.96 to place third. Initially, it was thought Simpson had qualified for the 2022 World Aquatics Championships in Budapest, Hungary, as Kyle Chalmers was not going to swim, but Chalmers changed his mind, ultimately pushing Simpson out of the team. In the 50 metre butterfly, Simpson swam a time of 23.79 in the preliminary heats to qualify fifth and advance through to the final, where he finished in fourth place with a time of 23.68. Simpson also swam in the 100 metre freestyle, swimming a time of 49.43, but was disqualified after a false start. The disqualification was overturned on protest, and Simpson advanced into the final, finishing eighth with a time of 49.34.

==== 2022 Commonwealth Games ====
Simpson was selected for the 2022 Commonwealth Games in Birmingham, England on 22 May 2022. In the wake of Isaac Cooper being sent home from the Games, Simpson was selected to swim in the 50 metre butterfly on the first day of competition. He swam a 23.84 in the preliminary heats to qualify in tenth fastest for the semifinal, but failed to advance into the final after finishing in 14th place with a time of 23.87. Simpson was part of the 4 × 100 metre freestyle relay, swimming the second leg in the heats. His 48.86 split time helped Australia into the final, where they earned a gold medal. In the 100 metre butterfly, Simpson advanced through to the semifinals after qualifying fifth in the preliminary heats with a time of 52.47. In the semifinal, he swam a time of 52.16, placing fifth and making it through to the final, where he again placed fifth, swimming a time of 52.06. Simpson was also part of the 4 × 100 metre medley relay, swimming a 51.49 split for the butterfly leg. His efforts helped Australia advance to the finals, where they picked up a silver medal.

==== 2022 Australian Short Course Championships ====
At the Australian Short Course Swimming Championships held in Sydney, New South Wales in August 2022, Simpson entered five events. In the 50 metre butterfly, he swam a 23.13 in the preliminary heats to qualify third and make it through to the final where he placed fourth with a time of 23.06. In the 100 metre freestyle, Simpson swam a time of 47.89 in the preliminary heats, but failed to advance into the final after placing 12th. Simpson qualified third in the 100 metre butterfly preliminary heats with a time of 51.15, making it through to the final where he finished fourth in a time of 50.46. In the 50 metre freestyle, Simpson qualified eighth in the preliminary heats with a time of 21.88 to advance through to the finals, where he swam a 21.67 to finish in seventh place. Simpson also competed in the 100 metre individual medley, qualifying third in the preliminary heats with a time of 53.56. In the finals, he swam a 52.67 to finish second behind American Grant House. As he was the first Australian to finish, Simpson earned a gold medal.

== Other works ==
In 2012, Simpson was a brand ambassador of Build-A-Bear Workshop. A year later, he became a brand ambassador for Teen Cancer America.

In June 2017, he was named the first United Nations Development Programme advocate for oceans. In August 2017, he was named one of Bonds brand ambassador for Home Grown campaign. He also featured in Stellar.

He signed with IMG Models in 2019. In February 2020, Simpson appeared in Australia's new Bonds "WeGotsYou" campaign. He released a book of poetry titled, Prince Neptune in April 2020. In August 2020, Simpson signed with talent agency ICM Partners. In 2021, he teamed up with Myer for their spring fashion ad campaign, and in May 2022, he was named the face of their High Winter campaign. In July, he signed a multi-year sponsorship deal with the Australian swimwear brand, Speedo.

Simpson founded a sustainable clothing line called Prince Neptune: The Label, which launched online in August 2022. In 2024, he launched an energy nutrition drink line called Dr. Hydrate.

== Personal life ==
Simpson dated Kylie Jenner in 2011. He dated Gigi Hadid from 2013 to May 2015. From October 2019 to August 2020, Simpson was in a relationship with Miley Cyrus. He then dated Belgian-American model, Marloes Stevens from December 2020 to January 2022. In April 2022, Simpson began dating fellow Australian swimmer, Emma McKeon. In early 2026, Simpson confirmed the relationship with McKeon had ended.

== Filmography ==
=== Film ===
Year	Title	Role	Notes
2012	Finding Cody	Himself	
2015	One Crazy Cruise	Cody Simpson	Guest appearance / television film
2020	Smiley Face Killers	Rob	

=== Television ===
Key
†	Denotes television productions that have not yet been released

Year	Title	Role	Notes
2011	So Random!	Himself - Performer	Musical guest singing "All Day"
2011	PrankStars	Himself	Episode, "Walk the Prank", alongside host Mitchel Musso and Zendaya
2011	N.B.T (Next Big Thing)	Himself	Guest star
2011	Extreme Makeover: Home Edition	Himself	Episode, "The Walker Family"
2012	Bucket & Skinner's Epic Adventures	Himself – Performer	Episode, "Epic Break-up"
2012	Punk'd	Himself	Victim
2012	Figure It Out	Himself	Contestant
2012	Cupcake Wars	Himself	Guest/Judge
2013	Ridiculousness	Himself	Episode "Cody Simpson", Season 3 Episode 19
2013	Golden Balls	Himself	Episode 289 Runner-up
2013	AwesomenessTV	Himself	Episode "Zay Zay and Jo Jo's Halloween Tips", Guest Host
2014	Instant Mom	Himself	Episode 14: "A Kids' Choice"
2014	Dancing with the Stars (US)	Himself	Contestant on season 18
2019	The Masked Singer (Australia)	Robot	Contestant / Winner
2021	Head Above Water	Himself	4 episodes
2027	The Traitors †	TBD	Season 5
As actor
2015	Cougar Town	Pete	Season 6, Episode 7
2025	He Had It Coming	Scott	2 episodes
2025	Zombie Plane		Post-production

=== Theater ===
Year	Title	Role	Location	Date
2018-2019	Anastasia	Dmitry	Broadhurst Theatre	29 November 2018 - 31 March 2019
2025	Guys and Dolls	Sky Masterson	Handa Opera on Sydney Harbour	21 March - 20 April 2025

== Discography ==
Studio albums

- Paradise (2012)
- Surfers Paradise (2013)
- Free (2015)
- Cody Simpson (2022)

== Tours ==
Headlining

- Welcome to Paradise Tour (2012)
- Paradise Tour (2013 - 2014)
- The Acoustic Sessions Tour (2014)
- Free Tour (2015)

Co-headlining

- Waiting 4U Tour (with Greyson Chance) (2011)

Promotional

- Coast to Coast Mall Tour (2011)

Opening act

- Big Time Summer Tour (for Big Time Rush) (2012)
- Believe Tour (for Justin Bieber) (2012 - 2013)

== Awards and nominations ==
Year	Type	Award	Result
2010	Nickelodeon Australian Kids Choice Awards 2010	Fresh Aussie Musos	Won
2010	Breakthrough of the Year Awards	Breakthrough Internet Sensation	Won
2012	2012 Kids' Choice Awards	Favourite Aussie Superstar	Won
2013	Nickelodeon Kids' Choice Awards	Aussie's Favorite Homegrown Act	Won
2013	Young Hollywood Awards	Role Model Award	Won
2013	MTV Europe Music Awards	Best Australia Act	Won
2014	2014 Kids' Choice Awards	Favourite Aussie Homegrown Act	Won
2015	Huading Awards	International Male Artist	Won
2015	GQ Men of the Year Awards	International Sensation	Won
2022	GQ Men of the Year Awards	GQ Sportsman of the Year Award	Nominated
