= Sam Tsui discography =

The discography of American singer Sam Tsui consists of five studio albums, four EPs and numerous singles.

== Studio albums ==
Title	Details
The Covers	Released: 2010; Label: Sh-K-Boom; Format: Digital
Make It Up	Released: 2013; Label: NoodleHouse Studios; Format: Digital
Trust	Released: 2018; Label: Sam Tsui; Format: Digital
Yearbook	Released: 2020; Label: Tsui Music; Format: Digital
Why Do We Sing? (The Official Soundtrack) (with Casey Breves)	Released: 2024; Label: Republic Records; Format: Digital

== Extended plays ==
Title	Details
DJ Got Us Falling in Love	Released: October 10, 2010; Label: mudhutdigital.com; Format: Digital
Christmas Everyday	Released: December 15, 2012; Label: mudhutdigital.com; Format: Digital
Wildfire	Released: June 24, 2014; Label: mudhutdigital.com; Format: Digital
Here Tomorrow: Songs for Elaia (with Casey Breves)	Released: 2022; Label: Mud Hut Digital; Format: Digital

== Singles ==
Year	Title	Details
2010	"Don't Want an Ending"	Producer: Kurt Hugo Schneider; Label: NoodleHouse Records
2011	"Start Again"	Producer: Kurt Hugo Schneider; Label: NoodleHouse Records
2014	"Wildfire"	Producer: Kurt Hugo Schneider; Label: NoodleHouse Records
2016	"Secret"	Co-Producer: Sam Tsui; Label: Sam Tsui
2017	"Cameo"	Label: Sam Tsui
2017	"Impatience"	Label: Sam Tsui
2018	"Cold Hands" (with Casey Breves)	
2019	"Shoot the Arrow"	
2019	"Gold Jacket"	
2019	"Muscle Memory"	
2021	"More PLZ"	

== Covers ==
Year	Title and cover
2010	"If I Die Young" (The Band Perry cover)
2010	"King of Anything" (Sara Bareilles cover)
2010	"The Only Exception" (Paramore cover featuring Kurt Hugo Schneider)
2010	"For Good" (with Nick Pitera)
2011	"In the Dark" (Dev cover)
2011	"Imagine" (with AHMIR)
2011	"Hold It Against Me" (Britney Spears cover)
2011	"Jar of Hearts" (Christina Perri cover)
2011	"Born This Way" (Lady Gaga cover)
2011	"Rolling in the Deep" (Adele cover)
2011	"How to Love" (Lil Wayne cover)
2011	"Someone Like You" (Adele cover)
2011	"We Found Love" (Rihanna cover)
2011	"Moves Like Jagger" (Maroon 5 cover)
2011	"The One That Got Away" (Katy Perry cover)
2012	"Domino" (Jessie J cover)
2012	"I Will Always Love You" (Whitney Houston tribute)
2012	"Stronger" (Kelly Clarkson cover)
2012	"Somebody That I Used to Know" (Gotye cover)
2012	"We Are Young" (fun. cover)
2012	"What Makes You Beautiful" (One Direction cover)
2012	"Britney Spears Medley" (Britney Spears cover)
2012	"Call Me Maybe" (Carly Rae Jepsen cover)
2012	"Safe and Sound" (Taylor Swift cover)
2012	"Wide Awake" (Katy Perry cover)
2012	"Titanium" (David Guetta cover)
2012	"Good Time" featuring Elle Winter (Owl City and Carly Rae Jepsen cover)
2012	"Little Things" (One Direction cover)
2012	"So Sick" (Ne-Yo cover)
2012	"One More Night" (Maroon 5 cover)
2012	"As Long as You Love Me" (Justin Bieber cover)
2012	"Skyfall" (Adele cover)
2012	"I Knew You Were Trouble" (Taylor Swift cover)
2013	"Don't You Worry Child" (Swedish House Mafia cover)
2013	"Try" (P!nk cover)
2013	"When I Was Your Man" (Bruno Mars cover)
2013	"Stay" (Rihanna cover)
2013	"Mirrors" (Justin Timberlake cover)
2013	"Clarity" (Zedd cover)
2013	"Heart Attack" (Demi Lovato cover)
2013	"Just Give Me a Reason" featuring Kylee (P!nk cover)
2013	"22" (Taylor Swift cover)
2013	"Come & Get It" (Selena Gomez cover)
2013	"Treasure/Get Lucky Mashup" (Bruno Mars and Daft Punk cover)
2013	"We Can't Stop" featuring Jason Pitts (Miley Cyrus cover)
2013	"Roar" (Katy Perry cover)
2013	"Wake Me Up" (Avicii cover)
2013	"Applause" (Lady Gaga cover)
2014	"Let it Go/Let Her Go (Mashup)" (Frozen/Passenger cover)
2014	"Timber / Counting Stars (Mashup)" (Kesha/OneRepublic cover)
2014	″Stay with Me″ (Sam Smith cover)
2014	″Maps″ (Maroon 5 cover)
2014	″Chandelier″ (Sia cover)
2014	″Break Free″ (Ariana Grande cover)
2014	″A Little Hard Hearted″ (Melissa Etheridge duet)
2014	″Home" featuring the YMCA Jerusalem Youth Chorus (Phillip Phillips cover)
2014	"Hideaway" (Kiesza cover)
2015	"Uptown Funk / Lips Are Movin (Mashup)" (Mark Ronson featuring Bruno Mars/Meghan Trainor cover)
2015	"Thinking Out Loud/I'm Not the Only One (Mashup)" (Ed Sheeran/Sam Smith cover)
2015	"Take Me to Church" (Hozier cover)
2015	"Sugar" (Maroon 5 cover)
2015	"Love Me like You Do" (Ellie Goulding cover)
2015	"FourFiveSeconds" (Rihanna cover)
2015	"Honey I'm Good" (Andy Grammer cover)
2015	"Shut Up and Dance/Want to Want Me (Mashup)" featuring Diamond White
2015	"Bad Blood" (Acapella cover)
2015	"Lean On/Lean on Me (Mashup)" featuring Casey Breves
2015	"Can't Feel My Face" (The Weeknd cover)
2015	"Photograph" (Ed Sheeran cover)
2015	"Stitches" (Shawn Mendes cover)
2015	"What Do You Mean/One Last Time (Mashup)" (Justin Bieber/Ariana Grande cover) featuring Casey Breves
2015	"Writing's On The Wall" (Sam Smith cover)
2015	"Levels" (Nick Jonas cover) featuring Jason Pitts
2015	"I Really Like You/Kamulah Satu-Satunya (Mashup)" (Carley Rae Jepsen/Dewa 19 cover) featuring Eka Gustiwana and Nadya Rafika
2015	"25" (Adele album cover)
2015	"Hello" (Adele cover) featuring Casey Breves and Kurt Schneider
2015	"We Three Kings" (John Henry Hopkins Jr. cover) featuring Yasmeen Al-Mazeedi and Jason Pitts)
2015	"Love Yourself" (Justin Bieber cover) featuring Kurt Schneider
2016	"Stressed Out" (Twenty One Pilots cover) featuring Kurt Schneider
2016	"Stand By You/Stand By Me (Mashup)" (Rachel Platten/Ben E. King cover) featuring Casey Breves
2016	"Pillowtalk" (Zayn cover)
2016	"Beat of My Drum" (Powers cover)
2016	"Roses" (The Chainsmokers cover) featuring Kurt Schneider
2016	"Here" (Alessia Cara cover) featuring Alex Goot
2016	"The Rainbow Connection" (Paul Williams cover)
2016	"7 Years" (Lukas Graham cover)
2016	"Don't Let Me Down" (The Chainsmokers cover)
2016	"No" (Meghan Trainor cover) featuring Kurt Schneider
2016	"Purple Rain" (Prince cover) featuring Kurt Schneider
2016	"Lost Boy" (Ruth B cover) featuring Zoe Rose
2016	"Can't Stop The Feeling/This Is What You Came For (Mashup)" (Justin Timberlake/Calvin Harris cover) featuring Casey Breves
2016	"Closer" (The Chainsmokers cover) featuring Kirsten Collins, Lia Kim and Kurt Schneider
2016	"Gold" (Kiiara cover)
2016	"Don't Wanna Know/We Don't Talk Anymore (Mashup)" (Maroon 5/Charlie Puth cover) featuring Alex G
2016	"Hallelujah" (Leonard Cohen cover) featuring Alex G and Casey Breves
2016	"All Time Low" (Jon Bellion cover) featuring Casey Breves and Kurt Schneider
2016	"Love Can Go To Hell" (Brandy Clark cover) featuring Brandy Clark
2016	"Careless Whisper" (George Michael cover)
2017	"Shape Of You" (Ed Sheeran cover) featuring Jason Pitts
2017	"Castle On The Hill" (Ed Sheeran cover) featuring Alex Goot
2017	"Mercy" (Shawn Mendes cover) featuring Kurt Schneider
2017	"I Don't Wanna Live Forever" (Zayn/Taylor Swift cover)
2017	"Million Reasons" (Lady Gaga cover)
2017	"Chained To The Rhythm" (Katy Perry cover)
2017	"Issues" (Julia Michaels cover)
2017	"That's What I Like" (Bruno Mars cover)
2017	"Cold/It Ain't Me (Mashup)" (Maroon 5/Selena Gomez cover)
2017	"Beauty and the Beast" (cover of the song from Disney's Beauty and the Beast) featuring Casey Breves
2017	"Something Just Like This" (Chainsmokers & Coldplay cover) featuring Kurt Schneider
2017	"The Cure" (Lady Gaga cover)
2017	"Slow Hands" (Niall Horan cover) featuring Jason Pitts
2017	"Malibu" (Miley Cyrus cover)
2017	"There's Nothing Holdin' Me Back" (Shawn Mendes cover)
2017	"Alone" (Heart cover)
2017	"Learn to Let Go" (Ke$ha cover)
2017	"Look What You Made Me Do" (Taylor Swift cover) featuring Madilyn Bailey
2017	"Walk on Water" (Thirty Seconds to Mars cover)
2017	"Perfect/Too Good at Goodbyes Mashup" (Ed Sheeran/Sam Smith cover) featuring Casey Breves
2018	"FAKE LOVE" (BTS cover) featuring Kurt Schneider and Megan Lee
2018	"Epiphany" (BTS cover) featuring Kurt Schneider
2018	"IDOL" (BTS cover) featuring Kurt Schneider and Megan Lee
2018	"Say Something" (Justin Timberlake ft. Chris Stapleton cover)
2018	The Middle (Acoustic Version) (Zedd/Maren Morris/Grey cover)
2018	Finesse (Bruno Mars ft. Cardi B cover)
2018	Friends (Marshmello/Anne-Marie cover) featuring Kirsten Collins
2018	No Tears Left to Cry (Ariana Grande cover)
2018	In My Blood (Acoustic) (Shawn Mendes cover)
2018	Girls Like You (Maroon 5 cover) with Kurt Hugo Schneider and DSharp
2018	Better Now (Post Malone cover) with Macy Kate
2018	Back To You (Selena Gomez cover) with Shannon K and Kurt Hugo Schneider
2018	Youngblood (5 Seconds of Summer cover)
2018	Solo (Acoustic) (Clean Bandit/Demi Lovato cover) featuring Jason Pitts
2018	Breathin' (Ariana Grande cover) with Alex Groot
2018	Shallow (Acoustic) (Lady Gaga cover)
2018	thank u, next (Acapella) (Ariana Grande cover)
2019	Without Me (Halsey cover) with Shannon K and Kurt Hugo Schneider
2019	Dancing with a Stranger (Sam Smith/Normani cover) with Kina Grannis
2019	Rocket Man (Piano Acoustic) (Elton John cover)
2019	Señorita (Shawn Mendes/Camila Cabello cover)
2019	Beautiful People (Acapella) (Ed Sheeran/Khalid cover)
2019	Someone You Loved (Piano Acoustic) (Lewis Capaldi cover) with Casey Breves
2019	Lose You To Love Me (Selena Gomez cover) with Allegra
2019	Memories (Maroon 5 cover) with Daiyan Trisha
2019	Kay Tagal Kitang Hinintay (Acoustic) (Sponge Cola cover) with Karylle
2020	Go Your Own Way (Acoustic) (Fleetwood Mac cover) with Casey Breves
2020	Dance Monkey (Piano Acoustic) (Tones and I cover)
2020	Intentions (Justin Bieber ft. Quavo cover) with Daiyan Trisha
2020	Death Bed (Coffee For Your Head cover) with Kirsten Collins and Kurt Hugo Schneider
2020	Blinding Lights (The Weeknd cover)
2020	Sweet Scar (Weird Genius cover) with Kurt Hugo Schneider
2020	exile (Acoustic) (Taylor Swift ft. Bon Iver cover)
2020	Dynamite (BTS cover)
2020	positions (Acapella) (Ariana Grande cover)
2021	Drivers License (Acoustic) (Olivia Rodrigo cover) with Casey Breves
2021	Save Your Tears (Piano Acoustic) (The Weeknd cover)
2021	Leave the Door Open (Acoustic) (Bruno Mars/Anderson .Paak/Silk Sonic cover)
2021	Kiss Me More (Piano Acoustic) (Doja Cat/SZA cover)
2021	Astronaut in the Ocean (Piano Acoustic) (Anthony Lion cover)
2021	Butter (Acapella) (BTS cover) with Casey Breves
2021	Don't Go Yet (Camilla Cabello cover)
2021	Stay (The Kid LAROI/Justin Bieber cover)
2021	THAT'S WHAT I WANT (Piano Acoustic) (Lil Nas X cover)
2021	Easy On Me (Piano Acoustic) (Adele cover) with Casey Breves
2021	All Too Well (Vocoder Version) (Taylor Swift cover)
2021	Not While I'm Around (Stephen Sondheim cover) with Casey Breves
2022	Surface Pressure (Acoustic) (Encanto cover)
2022	Break My Soul (Beyonce cover)
