= Lisa Fowler (disambiguation) =

Lisa Fowler is an EastEnders character.

Lisa Fowler may also refer to:

- Lisa Fowler (Youtube), beauty and style adviser
- Lisa Fowler (True Blood)
