= Megan Nicole =

American singer-songwriter

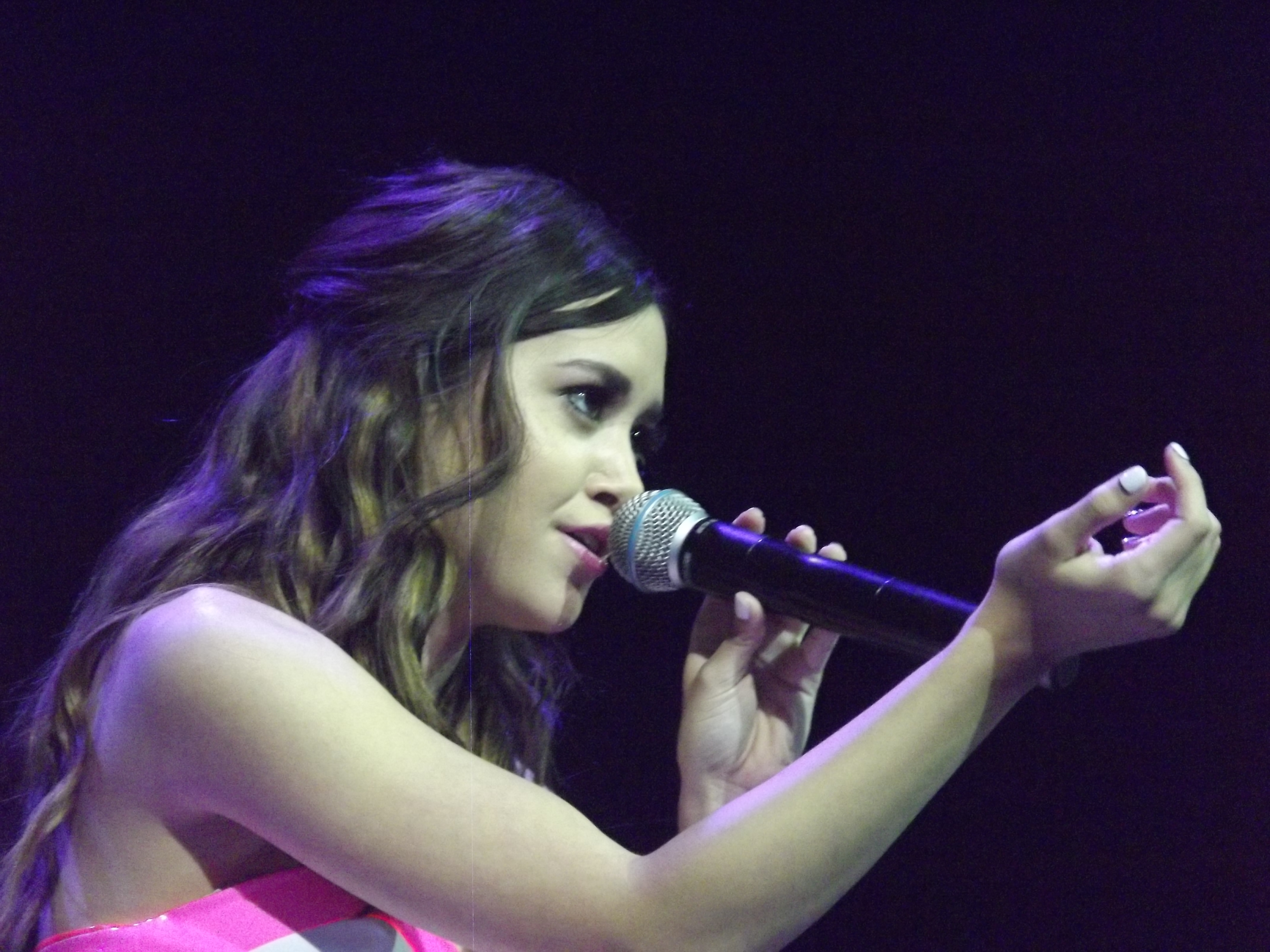
- Megan performing with IM5 in 2013
- Born: Megan Nicole Flores; September 1, 1993 (age 32); Katy, Texas, US
- Spouse: Cooper Green (m. 2017)
- Musical career
- Genres: Pop
- Occupations: Singer-songwriter; actress
- Instruments: Vocals; guitar; piano
- Years active: 2010–present
- Labels: Hume; Bad Boy
- Website: www.megannicolemusic.com

YouTube information
- Channel: megannicole
- Subscribers: 4.04 million
- Views: 952 million
- Last updated: April 23, 2026

Megan Nicole Green (née Flores, born September 1, 1993), simply known as Megan Nicole, is an American singer-songwriter and actress who debuted on YouTube in 2009.

== Early life ==
Megan Nicole was born in Houston, Texas to parents Tammy and Frankie Flores. She has a sister named Maddie Taylor. Her mother is of German and Native American descent and her father is Mexican American. She was raised in Katy, Texas and became interested in music around age 10, when her father purchased a karaoke machine for her. Nicole also participated in her church's music programs, taking part in a church band during high school and choir during middle school.

== Career ==
In 2009, Nicole uploaded her first video to YouTube, her cover of "Use Somebody" by Kings of Leon. She followed with more covers on her YouTube channel, including songs by Bruno Mars, Katy Perry, Demi Lovato, Miley Cyrus, Taylor Swift, Selena Gomez, One Direction, Echosmith and other artists. She has several collaborations with fellow YouTube artists such as Tiffany Alvord, Alyssa Bernal, Madilyn Bailey, Tyler Ward, Dave Days, Conor Maynard, and Lindsey Stirling.

Nicole released her first original song, "B-e-a-utiful", on July 15, 2011. Written by Nicole, Lairs Johnston, Stephen Folden, and Tom Mgrdichian, the "pop ditty" received one million hits after two days and had 27 million hits by November 2013.

In August 2012, Nicole signed with Bad Boy Records. In September 2012, Nicole reached number 29 on the Billboard Social 50 in her fourth week on the popularity chart.

An April 2014 article in The News Tribune said that on YouTube, Nicole had 1.5 million subscribers and 350 million video views. She also performed at the Pre-Show Party for the 2014 Radio Disney Music Awards.

On August 19, 2014, Nicole released her single "Electrified". This was her first single off her debut album Escape, an independent release on Hume Records following her departure from Bad Boy Records. With five new, original songs, all co-written by Nicole and Mgrdichian, Escape was released on October 14, 2014. The ‘80s-inspired music video for "Electrified" premiered on People.com on September 16, 2014.

Nicole starred in her first feature film, Summer Forever, alongside Alyson Stoner and Anna Grace Barlow. It was released through video on demand on September 4, 2015. In 2017, Nicole performed "Get Your Cape On", a cover of the theme song from the animated web series DC Super Hero Girls, originally performed by Jordyn Kane.

== Personal life ==
In March 2017, Nicole became engaged to Cooper Green. They were married on July 1, 2017.

== Discography ==
=== EP ===
EP and studio album Information
Escape
- Released: October 14, 2014 (U.S.)
- Label: Hume Records
- Produced by: Tom Mgrdichian
- Album Type: Studio Album
- Track listing:
  - 1. Electrified
  - 2. Fun
  - 3. Alright
  - 4. Escape
  - 5. Courageous
My Kind of Party
- Released: February 9, 2018 (U.S.)
- Label: Megan Nicole Music
- Album Type: Studio Album
- Track listing:
  - 1. Checklist
  - 2. My Kind of Party
  - 3. Take Me Back
  - 4. Nothing
  - 5. Clueless
  - 6. Favorite One

=== Singles ===
Title	Year	Album/EP
"B-e-a-utiful"	2011	Non-album singles
"Summer Forever"	2013	Non-album singles
"Never Wanna Let You Go"	2014	Non-album singles
"Never Have I Ever"	2014	Non-album singles
"Electrified"	2014	Escape
"Fun"	2014	Escape
"Escape"	2014	Escape
"Look at Whatcha Done"	2015	Non-album singles
"Into the Fire"	2015	Non-album singles
"Silver Medal"	2015	Non-album singles
"Safe with Me"	2015	Non-album singles
"Fever"	2015	Non-album singles
"Mascara"	2016	Non-album singles
"Play It Cool"	2016	Non-album singles

=== Soundtrack appearances ===
Year	Title	Album
2015	"Legendary"	Summer Forever (soundtrack)
2015	"Never Say Never" with Alyson Stoner and Anna Grace Barlow	Summer Forever (soundtrack)
2015	"Lovesick Undercover"	Summer Forever (soundtrack)
2015	"Weekend Warriors" with Alyson Stoner and Anna Grace Barlow	Summer Forever (soundtrack)
2015	"Ours To Lose" with Alyson Stoner, Anna Grace Barlow and Ryan McCartan	Summer Forever (soundtrack)
2015	"About Tonight" with Ryan McCartan	Summer Forever (soundtrack)
2015	"Make An X" with Alyson Stoner and Anna Grace Barlow	Summer Forever (soundtrack)
2015	"Summer Forever" (2015 version)	Summer Forever (soundtrack)

== Videography ==
Title	Year	Director
"B-e-a-utiful"	2011	Kurt Hugo Schneider
"Summer Forever"	2013	Joseph Levi
"Snapshots (Best Days of Our Lives)"	2013	
"Never Wanna Let You Go"	2014	
"Never Have I Ever"	2014	Joseph Levi
"Electrified"	2014	Joseph Levi
"Alright"	2014	Joseph Levi
"Fun"	2014	Hannah Lux Davis
"Escape"	2015	Young Astronauts
"Look At Whatcha Done"	2015	
"Silver Medal"	2015	Joseph Levi
"Weekend Warriors"	2015	from Summer Forever Movie
"Safe with Me"	2015	Joseph Levi
"Fever"	2015	Sean Willis
"Mascara"	2016	Joseph Levi
"My Kind Of Party"	2018	Joseph Levi
"Checklist"	2018	Joseph Levi

== Filmography ==
=== Film ===
Year	Title	Role	Notes
2015	Summer Forever	Sydney	Lead role
2020	Emerson Heights	Gracie	

=== Web ===
Year	Title	Role	Notes
2014	10 Days of Megan Nicole	Herself	10 episodes
2014–present	Let's Be Friends with Megan Nicole	Herself	5 episodes
2016	Roommates	Megan	5 episodes
2017	Versus	Gamboa	6 episodes
