= Kurt Hugo Schneider =

American video editor and musician (born 1988)

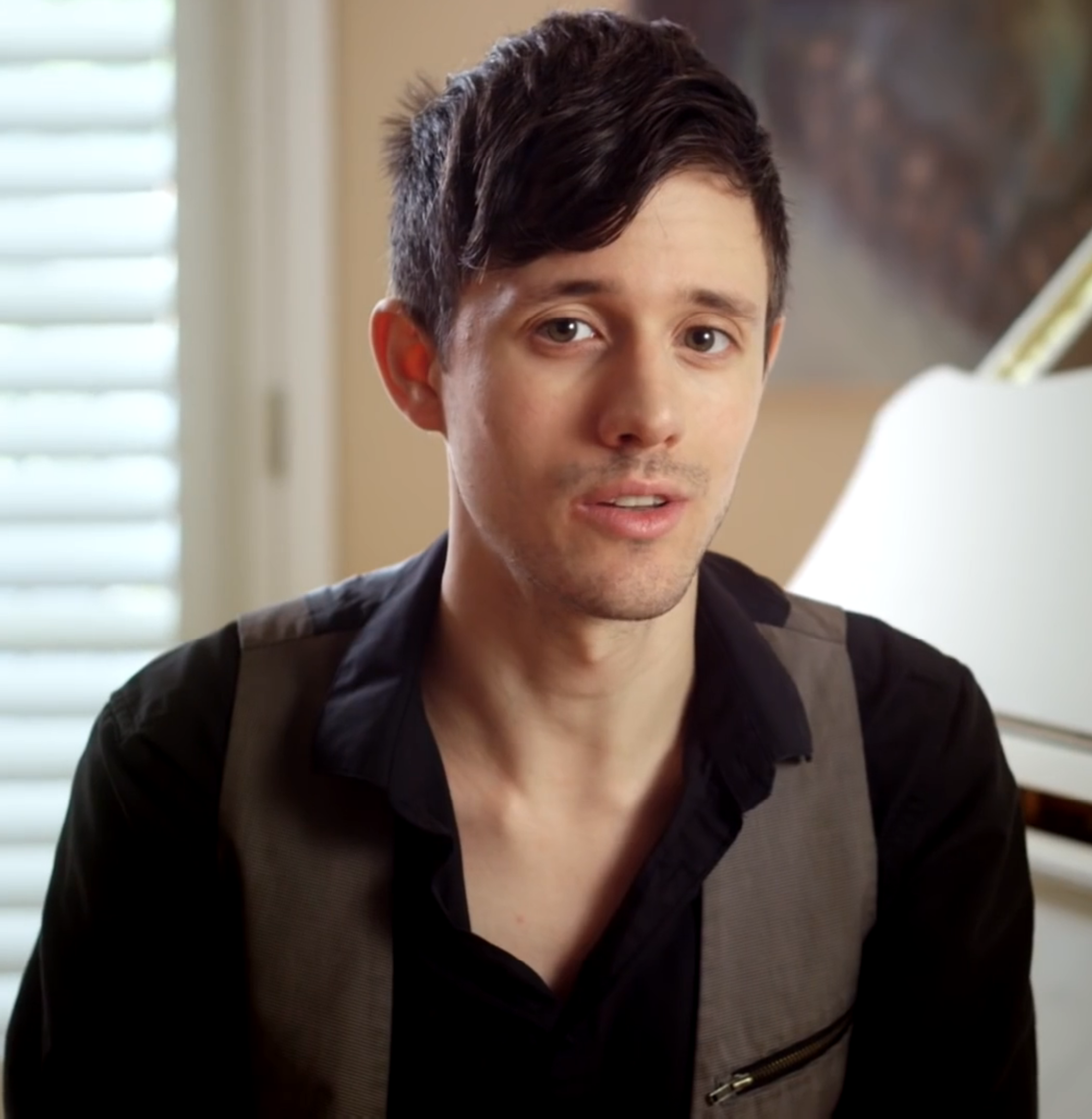
- Schneider in 2017
- Born: September 7, 1988 (age 37); Baltimore, Maryland, U.S.
- Education: Yale University (BA)
- Occupations: Director; producer; singer; songwriter; composer
- Years active: 2007–present
- Spouse: Patty Ho (m. 2021)
- Musical career
- Origin: Blue Bell, Pennsylvania, U.S.
- Genres: Pop; acoustic; synthpop
- Instruments: Piano; guitar; percussion; vocals
- Labels: Mud Hut Digital; NoodleHouse; Sh-K-Boom

Instagram information
- Page: kurtschneider
- Followers: 817 thousand

TikTok information
- Page: kurtschneider
- Followers: 1.8 million

X information
- Handle: @kurthschneider
- Followers: 230 thousand

YouTube information
- Channel: KurtHugoSchneider
- Subscribers: 13.4 million
- Views: 4.06 billion
- Last updated: 25 October 2025
- Chess career
- Country: United States
- Peak rating: 2212 (April 2009)

Kurt Hugo Schneider (born September 7, 1988), sometimes referred to by his initials KHS, is an American video editor, producer, musician, singer and songwriter, whose primary medium is YouTube music videos. He has produced music videos for various YouTube musicians, such as Sam Tsui.

== Early life ==
Kurt Hugo Schneider was born in Baltimore to Laurie S. Auth, a visual artist, and Michael Schneider, a mathematician. He grew up in Blue Bell, Pennsylvania, a suburb of Philadelphia, where he lived just a street away from Sam Tsui, whom he met while attending middle school. They both later attended Wissahickon High School. He graduated class valedictorian.

Schneider attended Yale University, where he got his start producing videos when he worked at Yale's Digital Media Center for the Arts. He graduated magna cum laude in 2010 with a degree in mathematics and was inducted into Phi Beta Kappa.

== Career ==
=== Collaboration with Sam Tsui ===
Schneider began collaborating with Sam Tsui while they were both students at Wissahickon High School.

Schneider and Jake Bruene created the musical web series College Musical fall semester 2008 at Yale. Schneider composed the songs and cast the project from Yale's music community, which included Sam Tsui and Allison Williams. The first episode aired on YouTube in January 2009. They shot an independent film based upon their online musical series, College Musical: The Movie, summer of 2010 and released online it on September 3, 2014. A series of behind-the-scenes videos for the movie, filmed and narrated by Nick Uhas, has been released on YouTube.

He produced videos of Tsui singing covers and medleys.

They garnered wide media attention with a video of a Michael Jackson medley. This video remains the 9th most viewed (more than 34 million) on Schneider's YouTube channel KurtHugoSchneider. This medley is one of several in which Schneider, using video editing, creates the illusion of a one-man a cappella choir, with Tsui covering lead and backing vocals, playing multiple versions of himself. Their medley videos have been described by Time as a combination of Glee and Attack of the Clones. The viral videos led to a few appearances on national television, including The Oprah Winfrey Show and The Ellen DeGeneres Show. On February 3, 2011, Schneider's video of Tsui covering Hold It Against Me, in which Tsui sang and played the piano with Schneider on percussion, was featured on Britney Spears' official website.

The popularity of their videos has encouraged the duo to branch out to other projects. Since September 2010, Schneider and Tsui have also begun to release videos of original songs and in May 2013, Sam Tsui's debut original album, Make It Up, was released.

=== Other works ===
Schneider has also made music videos in collaboration with other artists. Popular videos include a Miley Cyrus medley sung by Christina Grimmie, a duet between Tsui and Grimmie singing Just a Dream (the most viewed video on 'KurtHugoSchneider', with over two hundred million views), and a Starcraft-themed parody video, with Husky, of "Baby". He has also parodied the infamous "Friday" by Rebecca Black with his variation being known as "Void Rays". He has collaborated with Tiffany Alvord on a Taylor Swift medley and Matisse on a medley of Rihanna songs. Some of his earlier videos include collaborations with now-actress Allison Williams. He has also collaborated with Max Schneider (no relation) on a number of occasions: for example he directed a Bruno Mars medley for Schneider and Victoria Justice, a Maroon 5 medley and a Christmas medley. Schneider also co-wrote 'Standing In China' with Schneider for Cody Simpson's album Paradise. Schneider was also an associate producer for a musical admissions video for Yale, which features a cast consisting of Tsui and fellow Yale students.

He has also performed a cover of "Beauty and the Beat" by Justin Bieber with Alex Goot and Chrissy Costanza from Against the Current as well as a cover of "Counting Stars" by OneRepublic, a cover of "Can't Hold Us" by Macklemore and Ryan Lewis, and a cover of "Heart Attack" by Demi Lovato with Halocene.

=== Collaboration with Coca-Cola ===
In 2013, Schneider and Coca-Cola created music videos featuring creative covers of two 2011 singles: Calvin Harris' "Feel So Close" and Of Monsters and Men's "Little Talks" for a campaign called "The Sounds of AHH". Commercial edits of the singles premiered on the inaugural episode of season 13 of American Idol on January 14, 2014, on FOX.

In the two new versions, recreated by Schneider, he is shown making the track playing only Coca-Cola bottles, glasses and cans. In addition, "Feels So Close" features the vocals of Sam Tsui whereas on the track "Little Talks", he is accompanied musically by beatboxing cellist Kevin Olusola.

== Chess and puzzles ==
Schneider played for Yale's chess team. He currently holds a USCF Elo rating of 2235, holding the title of master, and has held a blindfolded simultaneous exhibition for the comedy series The Try Guys. He has also featured at the CES 2014 in the HRM Chess Tournament, hosted by Nordic Semiconductor in Las Vegas, while playing against Magnus Carlsen.

In February 2020, Schneider created a sudoku-based puzzle for Cracking the Cryptic. In March 2025, Schneider solved a sudoku-based puzzle with Cracking the Cryptic.

== Personal life ==
He is of German and Austrian descent on his father's side. Schneider has an older sister who is a classical pianist.

In August 2019 Schneider got engaged to his girlfriend of 5 years, Patty Ho. They were married in September 2021.

== Discography ==
The following is a list of singles released digitally to iTunes Store and recorded with artists other than Sam Tsui.

Covers

Year	Title	Artists	Original artists
2010	"Chopsticks!"	Andrew Johnson	Euphemia Allen
2010	"Iris"	Kurt Hugo Schneider, Jake Bruene	Goo Goo Dolls
2011	"Hold My Hand"	J Rice, Kurt Hugo Schneider	Michael Jackson ft. Akon

== Filmography ==
=== Film ===
Year	Title	Credits	Notes
2010	That's Why I Chose Yale	Associate producer, music producer, sound editor, vocalist, actor	Video (17 min) produced in collaboration with the Yale admissions office
2010	Nothing Left Unsaid	Director	Short (13 min) starring Daniel Amerman, Julie Shain and Jay Frisby
2014	College Musical: The Movie	Director	Short film

=== Music videos ===
This list covers only music videos made for solo works, Sam Tsui originals and collaborations with other artists not listed in the discography for Sam Tsui.

Year	Title	Artists	Original artists or work	Notes
2010
2010	"Can I Have This Dance"	Sam Tsui, Kurt Hugo Schneider	High School Musical	Cover version
2010	"Circus"	Jake Bruene, Kurt Hugo Schneider	Britney Spears	Cover version
2010	"Run"	Sam Tsui, Kurt Hugo Schneider	Snow Patrol	Cover version
2010	"Thinking of You"	Sam Tsui, Kurt Hugo Schneider	Katy Perry	Cover version
2010	"Don't Stop Believin'"	Sam Tsui, Kurt Hugo Schneider	Journey	Cover version
2010	"You and I Both"	Sam Tsui, Kurt Hugo Schneider	Jason Mraz	Cover version
2010	"Michael Jackson Medley"	Sam Tsui, Kurt Hugo Schneider	Michael Jackson	Medley of songs by Michael Jackson
2010	"Down"	Sam Tsui, Kurt Hugo Schneider	Jay Sean	Cover version
2010	"Breaking Free"	Sam Tsui, Allison Williams	High School Musical	Cover version
2010	"Keep Holding On"	Kurt Hugo Schneider	Avril Lavigne	Cover version
2010	"All I Want For Christmas Is You"	Sam Tsui, Kurt Hugo Schneider	Mariah Carey	Cover version
2010	"Tik Tok"	Allison Williams, Kurt Hugo Schneider	Kesha	Cover version
2010	"Replay"	Sam Tsui, Kurt Hugo Schneider	Iyaz	Cover version
2010	"Fireflies"	Sam Tsui, Kurt Hugo Schneider	Owl City	Cover version
2010	"Need You Now"	Sam Tsui, Kurt Hugo Schneider	Lady Antebellum	Cover version
2010	"Break Your Heart"	Jake Bruene, Frank Sacramone, Kurt Hugo Schneider	Taio Cruz	Cover version
2010	"Only Hope"	Tiffany Alvord, Kurt Hugo Schneider	Mandy Moore Switchfoot	Cover version
2010	"Nothin' On You", "Hey, Soul Sister"	Sam Tsui, Ahmir, Kurt Hugo Schneider	B.o.B, Bruno Mars, Train	Cover version
2010	"Miley Cyrus medley"	Christina Grimmie	Miley Cyrus	Medley of songs by Miley Cyrus
2010	"Heaven"	Sam Tsui	Bryan Adams	Cover version
2010	"Unwell"	Sam Tsui, Kurt Hugo Schneider	Matchbox Twenty	Cover version
2010	"For Good"	Sam Tsui ft. Nick Pitera	Wicked	Cover version of musical number from Wicked
2010	"Don't Want An Ending"	Sam Tsui		Original video featuring Amanda Glassman
2010	"Love The Way You Lie Mashup"	Sam Tsui	Rihanna	Mashup of the songs "Dynamite", "Love The Way You Lie", and "Teenage Dream"
2010	"If I Die Young"	Sam Tsui, Kurt Hugo Schneider	The Band Perry	Cover version
2010	"Just The Way You Are"	Sam Tsui	Bruno Mars	Cover version
2010	"DJ Got Us Falling In Love"	Sam Tsui, Kurt Hugo Schneider	Usher ft. Pitbull	Cover version
2010	"The Only Exception"	Sam Tsui	Paramore	Cover version
2010	"I Will Follow You Into The Dark"	Kurt Hugo Schneider	Death Cab for Cutie	Cover version
2010	"Just a Dream"	Sam Tsui, Christina Grimmie	Nelly	Cover version
2010	"Dynamite, Firework & Grenade"	Sam Tsui	Katy Perry, Bruno Mars, Taio Cruz	Mashup version of Taio Cruz's "Dynamite", Katy Perry's "Firework" and Bruno Mars' "Grenade"
2010	"Banelings"	Husky, Kurt Hugo Schneider	Justin Bieber	Parody version of Baby
2010	"Iris"	Kurt Hugo Schneider	Goo Goo Dolls	Cover version
2011	"Imagine"	Sam Tsui, AHMIR	John Lennon	Cover version; dedicated to the victims of the 2011 Tucson shooting
2011	"Hold My Hand"	J Rice, Kurt Hugo Schneider	Michael Jackson ft. Akon	Cover version
2011	"Pretty Eyes"	Alex Goot		Original song featuring Julie Shain
2011	"Hold It Against Me"	Sam Tsui	Britney Spears	Cover version
2011	"Start Again"	Sam Tsui		Original song featuring Veronica Ballestrini and Nick Uhas
2011	"Jar of Hearts"	Sam Tsui	Christina Perri	Cover version
2011	"You've Been on my Mind"	Dave Days		Original song
2011	"Void Rays"	Husky, Kurt Hugo Schneider	Rebecca Black	Parody version of "Friday"
2011	"Go Screw Yourself"	Avery		Original song
2011	"B-e-a-utiful"	Megan Nicole		Original song featuring Michael Jimenez
2011	"Rolling in the Deep"	Sam Tsui, Tyler Ward	Adele	Cover version
2011	"Rihanna Medley"	Matisse	Rihanna	Medley of songs by Rihanna
2011	"Skyscraper"	Olivia Noelle	Demi Lovato	Cover version
2011	"How to Love"	Sam Tsui	Lil Wayne	Cover version
2011	"Katy Perry Medley"	Olivia Noelle	Katy Perry	Medley of songs by Katy Perry
2011	"Happy Birthday"	Andrew Johnson		Original piano arrangement
2011	"The Hardest Thing"	Tyler Ward		Original song
2011	"Moves Like Jagger"	Sam Tsui	Maroon 5	Cover version
2011	"Right Here Waiting"	Kurt Hugo Schneider	Richard Marx	Cover version
2011	"How To Save A Life"	Alex Goot	The Fray	Cover version
2012	"Breakeven"	Max Schneider	The Script	Cover version
2012	"It Will Rain"	Max Schneider, Olivia Noelle	Bruno Mars	Cover version
2012	"Nerdy and I Know It"	Husky, Kurt Hugo Schneider	LMFAO	Parody version of "Sexy and I Know It"
2012	"Without You"	Max Schneider	David Guetta ft. Usher	Cover version
2012	"Stronger"	Sam Tsui, Kurt Hugo Schneider	Kelly Clarkson	Cover version
2012	"We Are Young"	Sam Tsui	fun	Cover version
2012	"Not Over You"	Max Schneider	Gavin DeGraw	Cover version
2012	"OneRepublic Medley"	Kurt Hugo Schneider	OneRepublic	Medley of songs by OneRepublic
2012	"Drops of Jupiter"	Alex Goot, Kurt Hugo Schneider	Train	Cover version
2012	"Somebody That I Used to Know"	Max Schneider, Kurt Hugo Schneider	Gotye	Cover version
2012	"A Thousand Years"	Aimée Proal, Lindsey Stirling, Kurt Hugo Schneider	Christina Perri	Cover version
2012	"Safe and Sound"	Sam Tsui, Kurt Hugo Schneider	Taylor Swift	Cover version
2012	"Lightning"	Alex Goot		Original video
2012	"Bruno Mars Medley"	Victoria Justice, Max Schneider, Kurt Hugo Schneider	Bruno Mars	Medley of songs by Bruno Mars
2012	"Pop Medley 2011"	Sam Tsui, Kurt Hugo Schneider	Various	Medley of pop songs from 2011
2012	"Lady Gaga Medley"	Sam Tsui, Kurt Hugo Schneider	Lady Gaga	Medley of songs by Lady Gaga
2012	"Lighters / Super Bass Mashup"	Aimée Proal, Kurt Hugo Schneider	Bad Meets Evil, Bruno Mars, Nicki Minaj	Mashup of the songs "Lighters" and "Super Bass"
2012	"Somewhere Only We Know"	Elizabeth Gillies, Max Schneider, Kurt Hugo Schneider	Keane	Cover version
2012	"Born This Way"	Sam Tsui, Kurt Hugo Schneider	Lady Gaga	Cover version
2012	"Rocketeer"	Jake Bruene, Kurt Hugo Schneider	Far East Movement	Cover version
2012	"Hold My Hand"	J Rice, Kurt Hugo Schneider	Michael Jackson, Akon	Cover version
2012	"King of Anything"	Sam Tsui, Kurt Hugo Schneider	Sara Bareilles	Cover version
2012	"Maroon 5 Medley"	Victoria Justice, Max Schneider, Kurt Hugo Schneider	Maroon 5	Medley of songs by Maroon 5
2012	"Call Me Maybe/Payphone Mashup"	James Alan ft. Jessica Jarrell	Carly Rae Jepsen, Maroon 5	Mashup of the songs "Call Me Maybe" and "Payphone"
2012	"Titanium"	Sam Tsui, Kurt Hugo Schneider	David Guetta ft. Sia	Cover version
2012	"Hey There Delilah"	Kurt Hugo Schneider	Plain White T's	Cover version
2012	"So Sick"	Sam Tsui, Max Schneider, Kurt Hugo Schneider	Ne-Yo	Cover version
2012	"Run To Me"	Kurt Hugo Schneider		Original song
2012	"One More Night"	Sam Tsui, Kurt Hugo Schneider	Maroon 5	Cover version; live recording
2012	"Skyfall"	Sam Tsui, Kurt Hugo Schneider	Adele	Cover version
2012	"The A Team"	Kurt Hugo Schneider	Ed Sheeran	Cover version
2012	"Diamonds"	Kim Viera, Kurt Hugo Schneider	Rihanna	Cover version
2012	"Home"	James Alan, Kurt Hugo Schneider	Phillip Phillips	Cover version
2012	"Locked Out of Heaven"	Megan Nicole, Sam Tsui, Kurt Hugo Schneider	Bruno Mars (original version); Alex Clare, Justin Bieber, Taylor Swift, Kesha (mashup songs)	Mashup cover
2012	"Little Things"	Sam Tsui & Kurt Hugo Schneider	One Direction	Cover version
2012	"Holiday Medley"	Victoria Justice, Max Schneider, Kurt Hugo Schneider	Various	Medley of Christmas songs
2012	"I Knew You Were Trouble"	Sam Tsui, Kurt Hugo Schneider	Taylor Swift	Cover version
2012	"2012 Remix"	Various		Mashup of songs recorded in 2012
2013	"Beauty and a Beat"	Alex Goot, Chrissy Costanza & Kurt Hugo Schneider	Justin Bieber ft. Nicki Minaj	Cover version
2013	"Don't You Worry Child"	Sam Tsui & Kurt Hugo Schneider	Swedish House Mafia ft. John Martin	Cover version
2013	"Kiss You"	Sam Tsui, Kurt Hugo Schneider, Tyler Ward, Dave Days, Chester See (Not Another Boyband)	One Direction	Cover version
2013	"Give Me Love"	Max Schneider	Ed Sheeran	Cover version
2013	"Brave"	Action Item		Cover version
2013	"When I Was Your Man"	Max Schneider	Bruno Mars	Cover version
2013	"She Wolf (Falling to Pieces)"	Kim Viera, Kurt Hugo Schneider	David Guetta ft. Sia	Cover version
2013	"Pink Medley"	Macy Kate, Kurt Hugo Schneider	Pink	Medley of songs by Pink
2013	"Mirrors"	Sam Tsui, Kurt Hugo Schneider	Justin Timberlake	Cover version
2013	"Clarity"	Sam Tsui, Kurt Hugo Schneider	Zedd	Cover version
2013	"Me Without You"	Sam Tsui, Kurt Hugo Schneider	Sam Tsui	Original song, debut single from Make It Up
2013	"Heart Attack"	Sam Tsui, Chrissy Costanza of ATC	Demi Lovato	Cover version
2013	"Make It Up"	Sam Tsui, Kurt Hugo Schneider	Sam Tsui	Original song, second single from Make It Up
2013	"Just Give Me a Reason"	Sam Tsui, Kylee	P!nk	Cover version
2013	"Let Her Go"	Tyler Ward, Kurt Hugo Schneider	Passenger	Cover version
2013	"Can't Hold Us"	Max Schneider, Kurt Hugo Schneider	Macklemore	Cover version
2013	"22"	Alex Goot, Chrissy Costanza, Sam Tsui, King the Kid, Kurt Hugo Schneider	Taylor Swift	Cover version
2013	"Shadow"	Sam Tsui, Kurt Hugo Schneider	Sam Tsui	Original song
2013	"The Other Side"	Max Schneider, Keke Palmer, Jason Derulo, Kurt Hugo Schneider	Jason Derulo	Cover version
2013	"Come & Get It"	Sam Tsui, Kurt Hugo Schneider	Selena Gomez	Cover version
2013	"Cups"	Sam Tsui, Kina Grannis, Alex G, Kurt Hugo Schneider	Anna Kendrick	Cover version
2013	"Here's To Summer"	Jessica Jarrel, Kurt Hugo Schneider	Jessica Jarrel	Original song
2013	"Radioactive"	Macy Kate, Kurt Hugo Schneider	Imagine Dragons	Cover version
2013	"Demi Lovato medley"	Sara Skinner, Kurt Hugo Schneider	Demi Lovato	Medley of songs by Demi Lovato
2013	"Blurred Lines"	Max Schneider, Kurt Hugo Schneider	Robin Thicke	Cover version
2013	"Bring Me The Night"	Sam Tsui, Kina Grannis, Kurt Hugo Schneider	Sam Tsui ft. Kina Grannis	Original song
2013	"Treasure/Get Lucky Mashup"	Sam Tsui, Kurt Hugo Schneider	Bruno Mars, Daft Punk	Mashups of songs "Get Lucky" and "Treasure"
2013	"Worth It"	Sam Tsui		Original song
2013	Wrecking Ball	Sam Tsui, Kylee, Kurt Hugo Schneider	Miley Cyrus	Cover version
2014	"Unconditionally"	Sam Tsui, Kurt Hugo Schneider	Katy Perry	Cover version
2014	"Problem"	Max Schneider, Kurt Hugo Schneider	Ariana Grande	Cover version
2014	"Story of My Life"	Tyler Ward, Macy Kate, Kurt Hugo Schneider	One Direction	Cover version
2014	″Team″	Macy Kate, Kurt Hugo Schneider	Lorde	Cover version
2014	"Maps"	MAX, Alyson Stoner, Kurt Hugo Schneider	Maroon 5	Cover version
2014	"I H8 That"	Macy Kate		Original song
2014	"Sweater Weather"	Max Schneider, Alyson Stoner	The Neighbourhood	Cover version
2014	"Counting Stars"	Chrissy Costanza, Alex Goot, Kurt Hugo Schneider	OneRepublic	Cover version
2015	"2015 MASHUP"		Various	Every hit song in 4 minutes
2015	"Same Old Love"	Sam Tsui, Alyson Stoner, Kurt Hugo Schneider	Selena Gomez	Cover version
2015	"Sorry"	Against The Current, Alex Goot, Kurt Hugo Schneider	Justin Bieber	Cover version
2015	"I Really Like You"	MAX, Against The Current	Carly Rae Jepsen	Cover version
2015	"Love Yourself"	Sam Tsui, Kurt Hugo Schneider	Justin Bieber	Cover version
2015	"All I Want for Christmas Is You"	Chase Holfelder, Kurt Hugo Schneider	Mariah Carey	Cover version
2015	"Bad Blood"	Macy Kate & Ben Kheng	Taylor Swift	Cover version
2015	"Chaiyya Chaiyya / Don't Stop Mashup"	Kurt Hugo Schneider, Sam Tsui, Shankar Tucker, Vidya Vox	A. R. Rahman, Michael Jackson	Mashup of the songs "Chaiyya Chaiyya" and "Don't Stop 'Til You Get Enough"
2017	"Waving Through a Window"	VoicePlay, Kurt Hugo Schneider	Dear Evan Hansen, Ben Platt	Cover version of musical number from Dear Evan Hansen
2021	"Drivers License"	Kurt Hugo Schneider, Madilyn Bailey	Olivia Rodrigo	Cover version
