= Summer Forever (film) =

- Promotional poster
- Directed by: Roman White
- Written by: Elisa Delson; Roman White
- Produced by: Lisa Eisenpresser; Matt Weaver
- Starring: Megan Nicole; Alyson Stoner; Anna Grace Barlow; Ryan McCartan; Cody Johns; Stephen Colletti; Daphne Zuniga
- Cinematography: Corey Jennings
- Edited by: Gregory Hubson
- Music by: Jamie Christopherson
- Production companies: Relativity Digital Studios; Media Weaver Entertainment
- Distributed by: Maker Studios
- Release date: September 4, 2015
- Running time: 94 minutes
- Country: United States
- Language: English

Summer Forever is a 2015 musical film directed by Roman White and starring Megan Nicole, Alyson Stoner, Anna Grace Barlow, and Ryan McCartan. The film was released on September 4, 2015 by Relativity Digital Studios through video on demand.

== Synopsis ==
Three best friends named Sydney, Liv and Chloe make the most of their last summer weekend together before going their separate ways to college. After performing her final song at the coffee shop run by Liv's mother, Sophie, Sydney receives an offer from the head of Starmageddon Records, Austin Nicholas, who thinks she has potential to be a star and wants her to check out a video shoot for one of his recording acts. Chloe and Liv encourage her to go, and they make it one of Sydney's goals on their bucket list of things to do before the weekend is over. Sydney sets another goal to hook up with someone, while Liv's goal is to apply to Juilliard, and Chloe's is to throw a wild party at her house with her parents out of town.

While at Liv's house finding an outfit to wear for the video shoot, Sydney discovers a letter in Liv's bedroom indicating that she has already been accepted to Juilliard. At the shoot, Sydney meets with Austin but tells him she needs time to weigh his offer and her college plans. Chloe meets an interesting guy on the set named Broom, whom she invites to her party. Sydney's next door neighbor and boyfriend, Liam, who plans to be a traveling filmmaker, also attends the shoot but is troubled by what he sees following her meeting with Austin.

As Liv is about to spring the news about Juilliard to her mother, she finds out the coffee shop could be closing due to financial difficulties and decides to throw her dream away as a dancer to help her mother. The girls' friendship is threatened by Liv's sudden change in plans, as Liv takes out her anger over her future on Sydney, who is hurt by the comments hurled at her about how well her life is going by comparison, when she is just as afraid as Liv about her future. Sydney is also disgusted over Liam's insinuation that her meeting with Austin was anything more than professional, for which Liam later apologizes.

When Sophie finds the acceptance letter from Juilliard in the trash, she makes Liv realize this opportunity is way too important to pass up. Meanwhile, Sydney reflects on her late mother, particularly when she was learning music from her, and is reminded to listen to her heart in deciding what comes next. Her father also advises her to follow her heart and says her mother would have been proud of her record deal opportunity, though her parents value her education first and foremost. Sydney ultimately turns down Austin's offer, after which she runs into Liv and Chloe, who were intending to stop her from accepting the deal as well. The three make up after Liv apologizes to Sydney for what she said to her.

At Chloe's party, following Broom's spectacular rooftop display, things go fine until Liv's ex-boyfriend RJ shows up and becomes disruptive. Liv takes a stand against him, pushing him out of her life for good, but when she literally pushes him inside the house, it causes damage to some valuables belonging to Chloe's parents, forcing Chloe to end the party. One item survives the damage, a doll belonging to her mother, but feeling betrayed by her parents' treatment of her throughout her life, Chloe takes her own stand and breaks the doll.

Hours before the girls leave, Liam surprises Sydney in the treehouse by their homes, with many pictures he has taken of her over the years and a song expressing how much he loves her. The two share a kiss, and Liam tells Sydney he will miss her. The girls meet on the beach one more time, with Sydney giving Liv a plane ticket to New York, as she and Chloe surprise her with news that she will be starting at Juilliard this semester. Liv and Chloe will live together in New York, while Sydney heads to Boston.

== Cast ==
=== Main characters ===
- Megan Nicole as Sydney
- Alyson Stoner as Liv
- Anna Grace Barlow as Chloe
- Ryan McCartan as Liam

=== Supporting characters ===
- Daphne Zuniga as Sophie Paladino – Liv's mom.
- Andrew Bowen as Chris McAvoy – Sydney's dad.
- Stephen Colletti as Austin Nicholas – the "record label guy" from Starmageddon Records
- Cody Johns as RJ – Liv's ex-boyfriend.
- Jansen Panettiere as Broom – a stunt man in the music video shoot and Chloe's love interest.
- Karissa Vacker as Jasmine – Austin's assistant.
- Meg DeAngelis as April – the stage coordinator of the music video shoot
- Christina Ferraro as Sydney's late mom
- Madison Flores as a stylist in the music video shoot
- Alexis Maldonado as Young Sydney
- Taylor Locasio as Young Liv
- Hannah Swain as Young Chloe
- Jack Kwit as Young Liam
- We the Kings as themselves
- Heather Braverman as a performer in Sophie's coffee shop

== Soundtrack ==
Summer Forever Soundtrack

Soundtrack album by Various artists
- Released: September 4, 2015
- Recorded: 2015
- Genre: Pop
- Length: 48:46
- Label: Hollywood
- Producer: Relativity Music Group

The official film soundtrack was released on the same day as the film. The album includes ten original songs by the cast, one of them being a new version of Megan Nicole's single "Summer Forever" (originally released in 2013). Music videos of the songs "Weekend Warriors", "About Tonight", "Ours to Lose", and "Powerless" were released through the movie's YouTube channel and some of the cast's own YouTube channels. The album was distributed by the Relativity Music Group and the music was produced by Sam Hollander.

=== Track listing ===
No.	Title	Writer(s)	Performer(s)	Length
1.	"Legendary"	Charity Daw; Josh Edmondson	Megan Nicole	2:44
2.	"Shy"	Heather Braverman	Heather Braverman	2:56
3.	"Never Say Never"	Charity Daw; Josh Edmondson	Megan Nicole; Anna Grace Barlow; Alyson Stoner	3:01
4.	"Lovesick Undercover"	Megan Nicole; Charity Daw; Josh Edmondson	Megan Nicole	4:06
5.	"Kids in the Moonlight"	Travis Clark; Charity Daw; Sam Hollander; Josh Edmondson	We the Kings	3:21
6.	"Hostage"	Mackenzie Thoms; TJ Routon; Kara Madden	Mackenzie Thoms	3:22
7.	"Weekend Warriors"	Megan Nicole; Josh Edmondson; Charity Daw	Megan Nicole; Alyson Stoner; Anna Grace Barlow	3:32
8.	"Powerless"	Charity Daw; Josh Edmondson	Alyson Stoner	3:14
9.	"Ours to Lose"	Charity Daw; Josh Edmondson	Megan Nicole; Anna Grace Barlow; Alyson Stoner; Ryan McCartan	3:23
10.	"About Tonight"	Charity Daw; Josh Edmondson	Megan Nicole; Ryan McCartan	3:37
11.	"Make an X"	Charity Daw; Josh Edmondson	Alyson Stoner; Megan Nicole; Anna Grace Barlow	2:57
12.	"Big Time"	Charity Daw; Josh Edmondson	Ryan McCartan	3:27
13.	"Summer Forever (2015)"	Megan Nicole; Morgan Reid; Mika Guillory	Megan Nicole	3:45
14.	"Summer Forever Score Suite"	Jamie Christopherson		5:13

== Release ==
On February 20, 2015, Megan Nicole posted a video on her YouTube channel announcing she would be making a film based on her 2013 single, "Summer Forever". Originally, the film was set to be released in August 2015, but later, the cast announced that it would be released on September 4, 2015.
