= Ryan McCartan =

American actor and singer (born 1993)

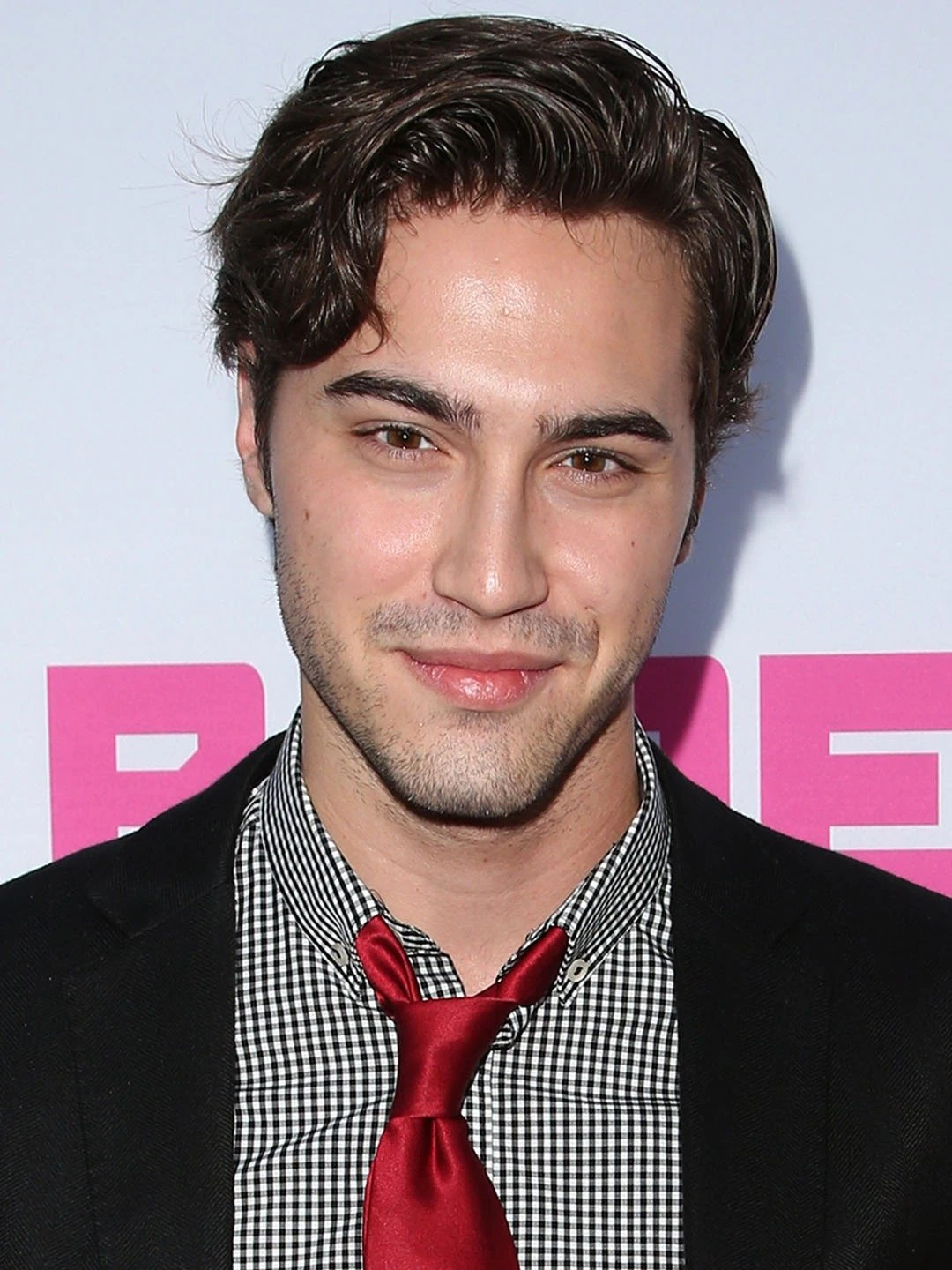
- Ryan McCartan in 2015
- Born: Ryan Jerome McCartan; June 14, 1993 (age 33); Excelsior, Minnesota, U.S.
- Occupations: Actor; singer
- Years active: 2011–present
- Known for: Heathers: The Musical; The Great Gatsby; Liv and Maddie

Ryan Jerome McCartan (born June 14, 1993) is an American actor and singer. He is known for creating the role of Jason "J.D." Dean in the original off-Broadway cast of Heathers: The Musical. His Broadway credits include Fiyero Tigelaar in Wicked, Prince Hans in Frozen and Jay Gatsby in The Great Gatsby.

On screen, McCartan starred as Brad Majors in the 2016 Fox musical television film The Rocky Horror Picture Show: Let's Do the Time Warp Again. He also played the recurring role of Diggie Smalls on the Disney Channel sitcom Liv and Maddie (2013–2017).

== Early life ==
McCartan was born on June 14, 1993, in Excelsior, Minnesota, and graduated from Minnetonka High School in 2011 where he had been part of the Minnetonka Theatre. His father, Conn McCartan, was the principal at Eden Prairie High School in Eden Prairie, Minnesota, until his retirement in June 2023.

== Career ==
McCartan began his career with a minor part in the stage version of High School Musical in 2007. In 2011 he starred in the titular role in Minnesota's first regional production of The Phantom of the Opera. That same year, he won Best Performance by an Actor at the Jimmy Awards, given out by The Broadway League to the top performers in high school musical productions.

McCartan originated the role of Jason Dean in the original off-Broadway cast of the musical Heathers, from March through August 2014. He previously played the role in the 2013 premiere of the musical in Los Angeles. In July 2013, McCartan began playing the recurring role of Diggie on the Disney Channel comedy Liv and Maddie. He remained on the show until its finale on March 24, 2017.

In 2015, he starred in the direct-to-video film R.L. Stine's Monsterville: Cabinet of Souls. In 2015, Dove Cameron and McCartan formed a pop duo called The Girl and the Dreamcatcher, and their first video was released in October 2015. The pair broke up in October 2016.

In 2016 McCartan was cast in the lead role of Brad Majors in the 2016 Fox musical television film The Rocky Horror Picture Show: Let's Do the Time Warp Again.

In mid-2018 he originated the lead role of Eddie Corbin in the new musical Mutt House at the Kirk Douglas Theatre. On September 11, 2018, McCartan made his Broadway debut as Fiyero in the musical Wicked. He remained with the show until May 12, 2019.

In August 2019 he played Lt. Cable in South Pacific at the Aspen Music Festival. Also in 2019, he starred as Mac in Roundabout Theatre Company's new musical Scotland PA. In November 2019 he made his solo show debut at Feinstein's/54 Below. In April 2020, he hosted the Broadway Cares/Equity Fights AIDS viewing of 25 Years of Disney Broadway.

He joined the cast of Frozen on Broadway as Hans in February 2020. However, due to the COVID-19 pandemic, all Broadway theatres were closed in March. During 2022, he played Hans in the U.S. National tour of Frozen; his final performance was on September 4, 2022.

In October 2022, McCartan was cast as Kyle Reed in The Winchesters, a spin-off of Supernatural. In June 2023, McCartan starred as Tony in a production of West Side Story at the Lyric Opera of Chicago. In November 2023, he starred as Cletis in the off-Broadway production of Lone Star. In September 2024, he took on the titular role in Randy Newman's Faust at The Soraya in Los Angeles, California.

McCartan joined the cast of The Great Gatsby on Broadway in January 2025, replacing Jeremy Jordan in the title role. He expected to star in West Side Story as Tony as a part of the Washington National Opera at the Lyric Baltimore and Music Center at Strathmore.

== Personal life ==
McCartan began dating actress and singer Dove Cameron, his Liv & Maddie co-star, in August 2013. He officially announced that Cameron was his fiancée on April 14, 2016. The relationship ended in October 2016.

In October 2017, McCartan began dating Samantha Fekete, with whom he ran a YouTube channel called The Stage Door, previously known as Sam & Ryan. In September 2023, they ended their romantic relationship but planned to continue running The Stage Door together. They soon discontinued the channel.

In 2014, McCartan tweeted that he has had Type-1 diabetes since age six. In 2019, he stated in an interview that he had been sexually abused by a theatre mentor when he was 12.

McCartan has self-identified as either queer or bisexual.

== Filmography ==
Film roles
Year	Title	Role	Notes
2015	Summer Forever	Liam	
2015	Monsterville: Cabinet of Souls	Hunter	Direct-to-video film
2016	Emma's Chance	Jacob Murphy	
2016	The Standoff	Farrell Bennett	
2018	The Forbidden Cure	Dr. Max Gerson	Nominated for Best Short Film at Burbank International Film Festival
2022	Love You Anyway	Daniel	Direct-to-video film
TBA	Only Good Feelings	Benny	Post-production

Television roles
Year	Title	Role	Notes
2011	Extremely Decent	Jeff	Television film
2013	The Middle	Ryan	Episode: "Valentine's Day IV"
2013	Monday Mornings	Daniel	Episode: "The Legend and the Fall"
2013–2017	Liv and Maddie	Digbert "Diggie" Smalls	Recurring role; 27 episodes
2014	Last Man Standing	Matt	Episode: "Tasers"
2014	Royal Pains	William "Cinco" Phipps V	Recurring role (season 6); 4 episodes
2015	Austin & Ally	Billie	Episode: "Duos & Deception"
2016	The Rocky Horror Picture Show: Let's Do the Time Warp Again	Brad Majors	Television film
2017	Midnight, Texas	Jeremy	2 episodes: "Riders on the Storm", "The Virgin Sacrifice"
2017	Freakish	Oliver "Ollie" Keller	Recurring role (season 2); 5 episodes
2018	Love Daily	Dylan	Episode: "Love and Cheese"
2018-2019	Princess Rap Battle	Mad Hatter	2 digital episodes
2022-2023	The Winchesters	Kyle Reed	Recurring role; 4 episodes

== Theatre credits ==
Year	Title	Role	Notes
2007	High School Musical on Stage!	Ensemble	Cargill Stage, Minneapolis, Minnesota
2010	The Master Butchers Singing Club	Franz Waldvogel	Guthrie Theater in Minneapolis
2010	How to Succeed in Business Without Really Trying	J. Pierrepont Finch	Won a Jimmy Award
2011	The Phantom of the Opera	The Phantom of the Opera	Minnetonka High School in Minnetonka, Minnesota
2013	Heathers: The Musical	Jason "J.D." Dean	Hudson Backstage Theatre in Los Angeles, California
2014	Heathers: The Musical	Jason "J.D." Dean	Off-Broadway at New World Stages
2018	Mutt House	Eddie Corbin	The Kirk Douglas Theatre in Culver City, California
2018–2019	**Wicked**	**Fiyero Tigelaar**	Gershwin Theatre: September 11 – December 30, 2018; January 22 – May 12, 2019
2019	South Pacific	Lieutenant Joseph Cable, USMC	Aspen Music Festival in Aspen, Colorado
2019	Scotland, PA	Mac	Off-Broadway at Laura Pels Theatre
2020	**Frozen**	**Prince Hans**	St. James Theatre: February 18 – March 11, 2020
2022	**Frozen**	**Prince Hans**	U.S. National Tour: March 17 – April 17, 2022; July 12 – September 4, 2022
2023	West Side Story	Tony	Lyric Opera of Chicago in Chicago, Illinois
2023	Lone Star	Cletis	Off-Broadway at the Theatre Row Building
2024	The Imaginary Invalid	Cléante	Florence Gould Hall
2024	Follies	Young Ben	Carnegie Hall
2024	Faust	Henry Faust	The Soraya in Los Angeles, California
2025	**The Great Gatsby**	**Jay Gatsby**	Broadway Theatre: January 21 – November 9, 2025
2025–2026	**The Great Gatsby**	**Jay Gatsby** (alternate)	Broadway Theatre: November 28 – December 27, 2025; January 26 – March 2, 2026
2026	**The Great Gatsby**	**Jay Gatsby**	Broadway Theatre: March 8 – 29, 2026; July 27 – present
2026	West Side Story	Tony	Lyric Baltimore in Baltimore, Maryland
2026	West Side Story	Tony	Music Center at Strathmore in Bethesda, Maryland

* Credits in bold indicate Broadway venues

== Discography ==
=== Studio albums ===
Title	Details
Heart Attack	Released: October 13, 2015; Format: CD; Label: Minty Swirl Records

=== Soundtrack albums ===
Title	Album details
Heathers: The Musical	Released: June 10, 2014; Format: CD, digital download, streaming; Label: Yellow Sound Label
The Rocky Horror Picture Show: Let's Do the Time Warp Again	Released: October 21, 2016; Format: CD, Digital download, streaming; Label: Ode Sounds & Visuals

=== Extended plays ===
Title	Details
The Opposite	Released: May 18, 2018; Format: Digital download, streaming; Label: Ryan's Gate Music
Seventh Avenue	Released: September 20, 2019; Format: Digital download, streaming; Label: Ryan's Gate Music

=== Singles ===
Title	Year	Album
"When You Went Away"	2017	Non-album singles
"Everything"	2017	Non-album singles
"Right Now"	2017	Non-album singles
"Changed My Mind"	2018	The Opposite
"He Don't Know You"	2018	The Opposite
"Acting Like You Don't"	2019	Seventh Avenue
"High and Low"	2020	TBA
"Politician"	2021	TBA
"Pink and Green"	2021	TBA

=== Promotional singles ===
Title	Year	Album
"You Can't Unlove Me"	2014	Non-album promotional single

=== Other appearances ===
Title	Year	Other artist(s)	Album
"Ours To Lose"	2015	Megan Nicole, Anna Grace Barlow, Alyson Stoner	Summer Forever
"About Tonight"	2015	Megan Nicole	Summer Forever
"Big Time"	2015	None	Summer Forever
"Pulled Back Down"	2020	Within Earshot, Britney Johnson	Within Earshot: Anthems For The In-Between
"This Nearly Was Mine"	2021	None	R&H Goes Pop!

=== Music videos ===
Title	Year	Director
"This Nearly Was Mine"	2021	Jeff Barry & Shawn Willis

== Awards ==
In 2011, he received a Jimmy Award for Best Performance by an Actor. In May 2025, he was nominated for a Broadway.com Audience Choice Award in the category of Favorite Replacement Actor for his performance in The Great Gatsby.
