= Alex Goot =

American singer-songwriter (born 1988)

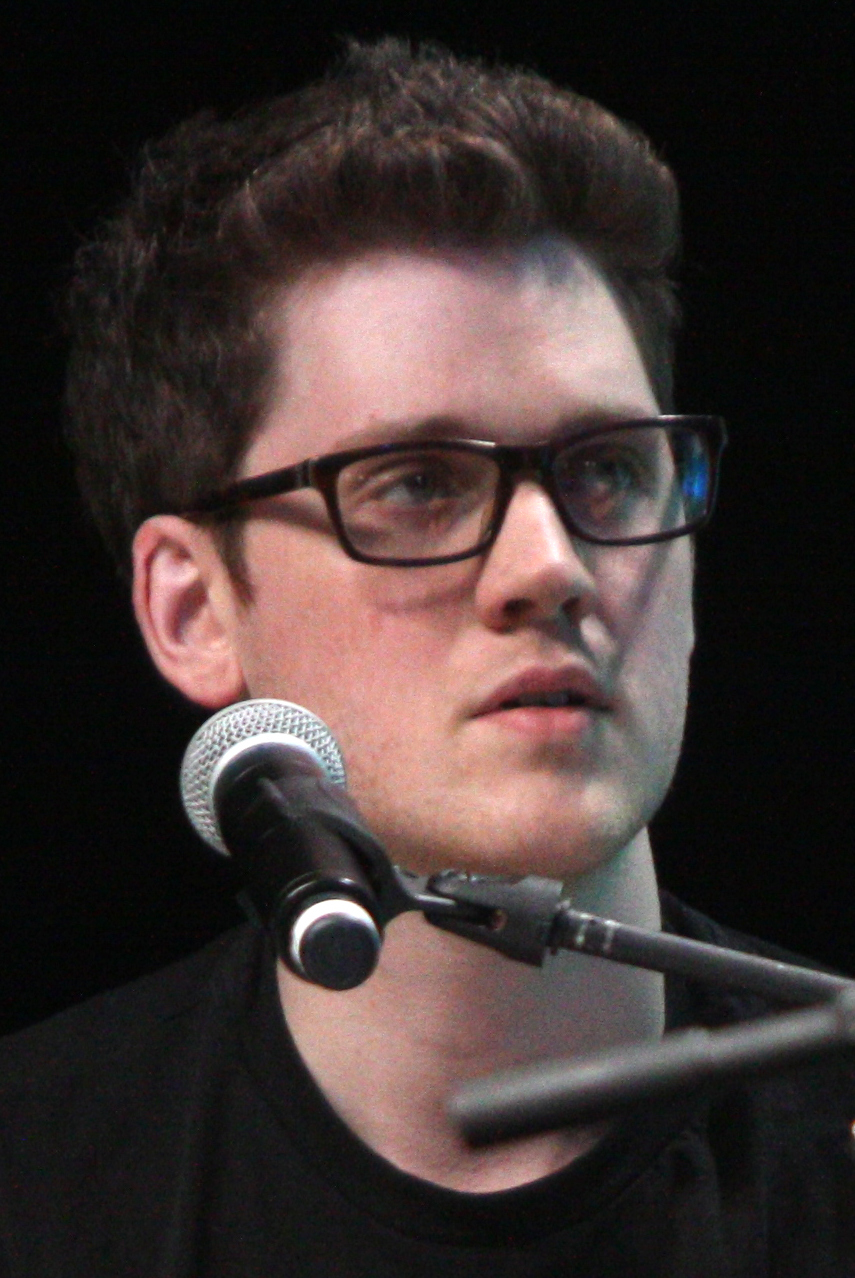
- Goot in 2012

Background information
- Born: Alexander George Goot; March 15, 1988 (age 38); Poughkeepsie, New York, US
- Genres: Pop; soft rock
- Occupations: singer-songwriter, record producer
- Instruments: Vocals, acoustic guitar, electric guitar, bass guitar, piano, drums, accordion, glockenspiel, cajon
- Years active: 2004–present
- Label: Alex Goot LLC
- Spouse: Elle Fowler (m. 2016)
- Website: Goot Music

Alexander George Goot (born March 15, 1988) is a singer-songwriter and multi-instrumentalist from New York City. As of 20 November 2025, his YouTube channel GootMusic has 3.83 million subscribers and more than 900 million total views. He plays acoustic guitar, bass guitar, piano, drums and other instruments.

== Biography and career ==
"My goals have been to reach as many people as possible with my music, and enhance peoples' lives by making music that they can enjoy any time."

Goot began recording music in 2004 at the age of 16 and since then has gained popularity from his profiles on various social network sites as well as his own website, from which Alex distributes some of his music and provides news and regular updates. His time is almost all spent in his home studio self-producing all audio and video for his releases, or touring the world.

Goot released his first studio album In Your Atmosphere, which was made possible by his fans via an extremely successful Kickstarter campaign. His YouTube channel has about 3,000,000 subscribers and his videos have been viewed over 800 million times.

Goot first recorded his music and videos for many years in his home studio in Poughkeepsie, he moved in early February 2015, immediately after his European tour in January 2015, to Los Angeles.

Goot has made several videos in collaboration with other artists such as We Are the in Crowd, Kurt Hugo Schneider, Megan Nicole, Sam Tsui and Against the Current.

Goot has released four volumes of Songs I Wish I Wrote with most of the versions of his channel on YouTube.

== Personal life ==
Alexander Goot was born in Wisconsin, and he grew up in Vermont and New York state. He became engaged to his girlfriend of two years, Elle Fowler, on July 3, 2015. Alex proposed on the beach, wrote the song "Unstoppable" about her, and played it during the proposal. On June 19, 2016, Goot and Elle Fowler married in Bacara Resort & Spa in Santa Barbara, California. On June 21, 2018, they announced the birth of their son, James Alexander Goot. On April 4, 2022, they announced the birth of their second son, Scott William Goot. In February 2025, the birth of their daughter Juliette Claire was announced.

== Discography ==
=== Studio albums of original songs ===
- 2005: 158 (released under the artist name "Goot")
- 2008: Arranged Noise (released under the artist name "Goot")
- 2012: In Your Atmosphere
- 2013: In Your Atmosphere (Deluxe Edition) (4 additional tracks)
- 2014: Wake Up Call

=== Studio albums of cover songs ===
Songs I Wish I Wrote

- 2010: Songs I Wish I Wrote
- 2011: Songs I Wish I Wrote, Vol. 2
- 2012: Songs I Wish I Wrote, Vol. 3
- 2014: Songs I Wish I Wrote, Vol. 4
- 2015: Songs I Wish I Wrote: Unplugged

Alex Goot & Friends

- 2012: Alex Goot & Friends, Vol. 1
- 2012: Alex Goot & Friends, Vol. 2
- 2014: Alex Goot & Friends, Vol. 3
- 2015: Alex Goot & Friends, Vol. 4
- 2017: Alex Goot & Friends, Vol. 5

=== EPs ===
- 2007: Asleep at the Wheel (released under the artist name "Goot")
- 2008: Progress – EP (released under the artist name "Goot")
- 2009: Take Cover (released under the artist name "Goot")
- 2009: Read My Mind (released under the artist name "Goot")
- 2010: Sensitivity EP
- 2014: Wake Up Call

=== Singles ===
- 2010: Breathless
- 2010: Next Christmas Eve
- 2011: Pretty Eyes
- 2011: Sensitivity
- 2011: We Could Love
- 2012: Bright Lights (Fly)
- 2012: The Real You
- 2012: Lightning
- 2013: We Could Love
- 2013: Secret Girl
- 2013: Living Addiction
- 2014: Just To Shine
- 2014: Wake Up Call
- 2014: Right Where I Belong
- 2015: Unstoppable
- 2016: Helium
- 2018: Fix You

== Awards and nominations ==
Year	Award	Category	Work nominated	Results	Sou.
2011	MTV O Music Awards I	Best Fan Cover	"Hold It Against Me" (Britney Spears)	Won	
2013	3rd Streamy Awards	Best Original Song	"Lightning"	Nominated	
