= Tiffany Alvord =

American singer-songwriter and actress (born 1992)

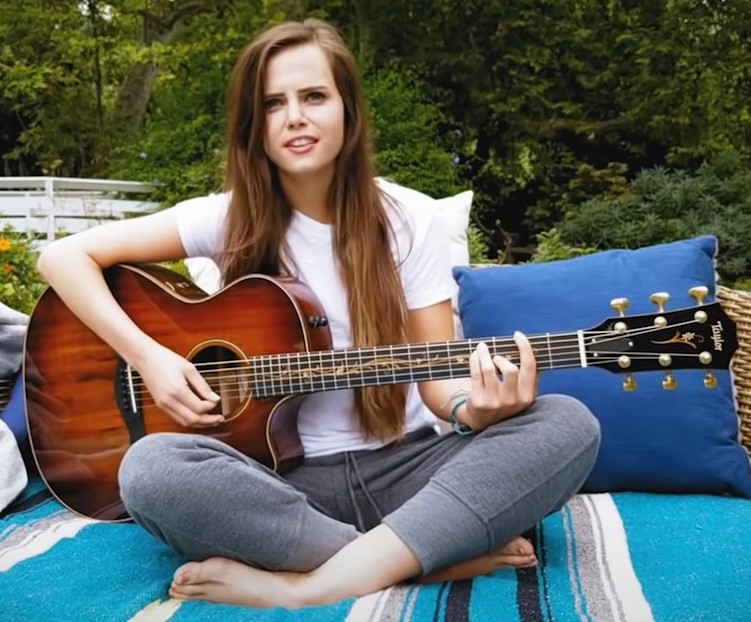
- Alvord plays guitar on Guilty Party in 2017

Background information
- Born: Tiffany Lynn Alvord; December 11, 1992 (age 33); La Cañada Flintridge, California, U.S.
- Occupations: Singer; songwriter; actress
- Instruments: Guitar; piano; ukulele; vocals
- Years active: 2008–present
- Label: Unsigned
- Website: www.tiffanyalvord.com

Tiffany Lynn Alvord (born December 11, 1992) is an American singer and songwriter. She has been cited as one of YouTube's first "home-grown celebrities". In December 2012, Alvord performed in Times Square on the Nivea stage with Carly Rae Jepsen, Train, PSY and Taylor Swift as part of the 2012 New Year's Eve celebration.

== Biography ==
Alvord was born December 11, 1992, in California, the daughter of Cherie Alvord, who works as her manager. She is the second youngest of seven siblings, having six brothers. When in elementary school, Alvord learned to play the piano and wrote her first songs by age ten. At the age of 14, she taught herself to play the guitar, her second musical instrument. The following year, in April 2008, at 15, she published her first song on YouTube.

Alvord trained as a gymnast for nine years and spent four years competing until a sport-ending injury during competition. She finished high school in 2010, taking three years. Alvord postponed college to focus on her music.

== Career ==
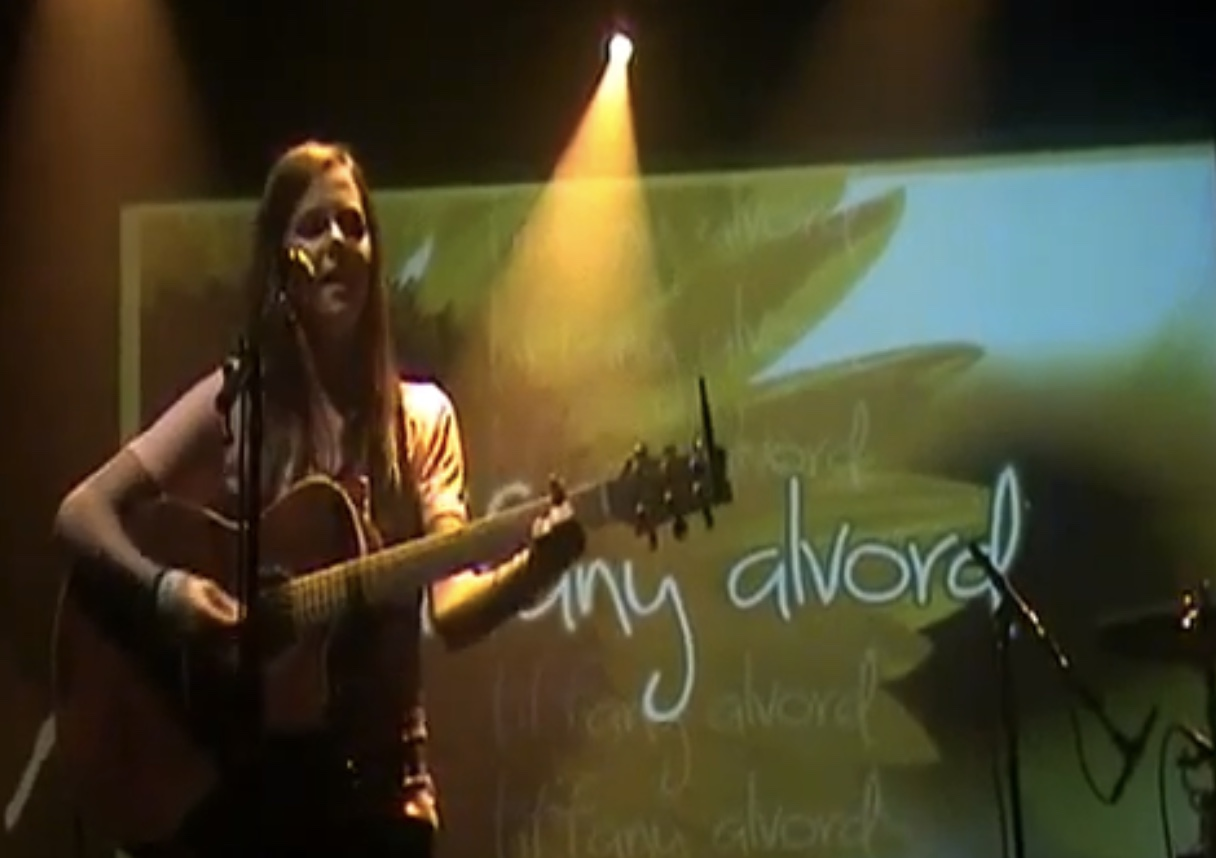
Alvord performing at the Highline Ballroom in Manhattan in 2011

Alvord's career includes performances in Canada, England, China, Singapore, Thailand, Indonesia, Malaysia, and the Philippines. She opened for Boyce Avenue on their U.S. tour during February and March 2011, and headlined with Alex Goot on a U.S. tour between August and September of the same year.

In June 2012, Alvord took first place in an ArtistSignal competition, winning a $25,000 grand prize. Then on June 29, 2012, she released her third album, I've Got It Covered Vol. 2, which has 10 cover songs made popular on her YouTube channel. On September 18, Alvord released her fourth album on iTunes, entitled My Heart Is. In December, she performed in Times Square on the Nivea stage with Carly Rae Jepsen, Train, PSY and Taylor Swift as part of the 2012 New Year's Eve celebration.

Alvord headlined a tour in four different countries in Southeast Asia during March 2013, and co-headlined a West Coast tour of the U.S. in April 2013 with fellow YouTube star Jason Chen. In July 2013, Alvord performed live in Europe for the first time, headlining sold-out shows in London, including the historic London Hippodrome. During the trip, Alvord was featured on a live interview with Simon Lederman on 94.9 BBC Radio, London.

On August 13, 2013, she released her fifth album, I've Got It Covered Vol. 3. The next year, Alvord released her Legacy album, on August 12. In 2014, Animoca Brands launched a game, Tiffany Alvord: Dream World. It adopts same engine from Star Girl, a fashion game which Animoca had developed. Alvord has been covered by numerous print and online publications, including The Wall Street Journal, The New York Times, Fortune magazine, Alternative Press magazine, Ora TV, Empty Lighthouse Magazine, AdWeek, Yareah magazine, and AOL On. In 2017, Alvord made her acting debut in the first season of the teen drama web series Guilty Party as Emma Wilson.

== Discography ==
=== Original Music ===
Title	Album details
My Dream	Released: December 20, 2011; Label: Unsigned; Format: Digital download, physical copy
My Heart Is	Released: September 18, 2012; Label: Unsigned; Format: Digital download, physical copy
Legacy	Released: August 12, 2014; Label: Unsigned; Format: Digital download, physical copy

=== Cover albums ===
EP and studio album information
I've Got It Covered	Released: June 23, 2011; Label: Unsigned; Album type: Studio album; Format: Digital download
I've Got It Covered Vol. 2	Released: June 29, 2012 (U.S.); Label: Unsigned; Album type: Studio album; Format: Digital download
I've Got It Covered Vol. 3	Released: August 13, 2013; Label: Unsigned; Album type: Studio album; Format: Digital download

== Filmography ==
Year	Title	Role	Notes
2017–2018	Guilty Party	Emma Wilson / Harper Vince	9 episodes (as Emma Wilson; season 1); 8 episodes (as Harper Vince; season 2)
2017	School Spirits	Zoey Slade	
