= Elle and Blair Fowler =

Sister duo

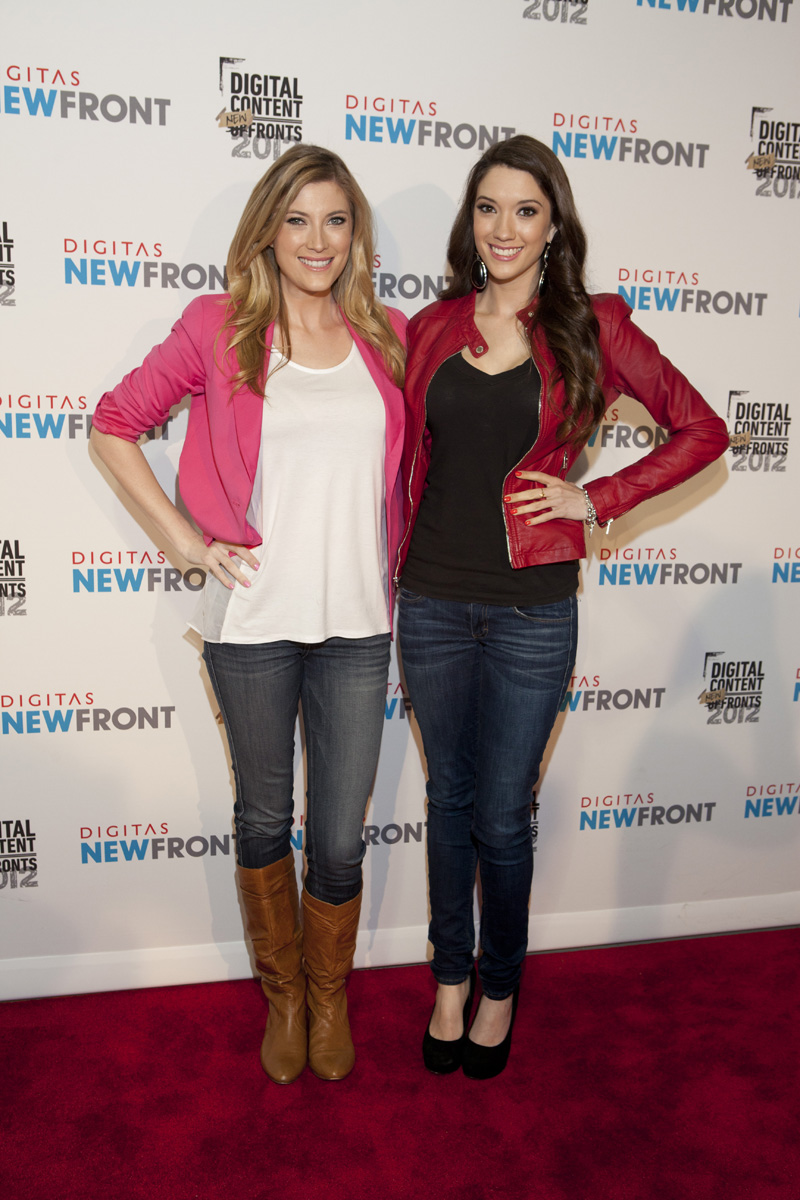
- The Fowler sisters in 2012
- Born: Lisa Sylvia Fowler: May 25, 1988 (age 38); Laura Elizabeth Fowler: April 1, 1993 (age 33); Augusta, Georgia, U.S.
- Occupation: YouTube beauty gurus
- Years active: 2008–present
- Spouse: Alex Goot (m. 2016) (Elle) Grant Gordon (m. 2024) (Blair)
- Children: 3 (Elle)

YouTube information
- Channels: juicystar07 (Blair); Elle Fowler (Elle)
- Years active: 2008–present
- Genres: Beauty, style
- Subscribers: 1.68 million (Blair); 1.17 million (Elle)
- Views: 294.95 million (Blair); 181 million (Elle)
- Last updated: September 22, 2021

Elle Fowler (born May 25, 1988) and Blair Fowler (born April 1, 1993) are sisters who posted beauty and style-related content and tutorials on YouTube as AllThatGlitters21 (Elle) and juicystar07 (Blair). Elle discovered the online beauty and fashion world during the summer of 2008 and convinced Blair to join her. Their videos of makeup tutorials and clothing hauls quickly garnered a large audience and rose in popularity. As of August 2017, Elle's videos on AllThatGlitters21 have been viewed more than 180 million times, while Blair's channel juicystar07 has received over 270 million views.

Both sisters previously posted vlogs under the monikers EllesGlitterGossip and otherjuicystar07, allowing subscribers to keep track of their daily lives outside of the YouTube community. Their respective second YouTube channels move away from purely beauty and fashion-related videos and branch into other topics such as health & fitness, their daily musings, and other random interests.

In late 2015, it was announced that Blair and the girls' father, Scott, would be cast in The Amazing Race 28, which will be a special edition with social media personalities but their season came to an end in Leg 7 where they placed 7th.

== Backgrounds ==
The sisters were born to Dr. Scott Fowler, an OB/GYN, and Melisa Fowler (née Kuran). Their mother is of Turkish origin and was born in Istanbul, Turkey. "Elle" was born Lisa Sylvia Fowler on May 25, 1988, and "Blair" was born Laura Elizabeth Fowler on April 1, 1993, in Augusta, Georgia. Their younger sister, Emily Kaitlin-Rose Fowler, was born on October 15, 2002. After Blair's fifth birthday, the family relocated from New Orleans to Kingsport, Tennessee, where Blair attended Dobyns-Bennett High School. Elle attended Miami University in Ohio where she joined Alpha Chi Omega. They adopted the aliases Elle and Blair as their DBA names when they began their online careers, because their parents did not want them to use their real names.

== YouTube career ==
The sisters first began posting YouTube videos in 2008. Elle chose her username after her favorite MAC eyeshadow called "All That Glitters", and Blair chose her username after Juicy Couture. In 2010 their videos received over 75 million views. They were later invited by Seventeen to offer makeup tips and suggestions to readers and in an interview with Good Morning America Blair mentioned that she had to become homeschooled due to a bullying situation in her sophomore year of high school. The two have received criticism over their haul videos potentially fueling shopping addictions and cultural idealizations of consumption and materialism, with an expert in shopping addiction listing the video as an example. In 2012 the Fowlers became the hosts and main judges of the webseries Beauty Vlogger Boot Camp, which revolved around young men and women aspiring to be online gurus. Each episode had the contestants competing in a beauty-related challenge, with one person getting eliminated before the next round begins. They have also been nominated twice for Teen Choice Awards in the "Web Star" category for 2011 and 2012. They were also nominated for the 2014 Teen Choice Awards under the category "Choice Web Star-Beauty/Fashion."

The two later released a novel entitled Beneath the Glitter (written by a ghostwriter, as cited at the end of it), with the character supposedly being only loosely based on the sisters. The Fowlers have also released a makeup line, Skylark. It later sparked controversy when they released three sample perfumes (Skylark Memoir Fragrance Collection) while having their audience vote for one of them, which would ultimately be made as a full size perfume. However, they stopped mentioning those samples, leading to frustrated followers contacting the company and being told that there will not be a full size fragrance, and that they can get a refund. In May 2020, Elle discussed what had happened with Skylark in her video “What happened to Skylark?!” She stated that the company producing the Skylark perfume backed out of their agreement, and told the sisters that they were not able to address the situation to their followers. Elle remarked that “it almost ruined us” and the experience turned the pair off from future endeavors in cosmetics.

In October 2012 it was announced that they would release a shoe and handbag line in conjunction with online fashion retailer JustFab.

In 2015, Elle started an online planner sticker shop called "Glam Planner." She created a third YouTube channel in support of this venture that she posts videos to regularly. For a few years, she stopped posting on her channel, but recently started again stating that she will make videos again but not consider it her full-time job

== Bibliography ==
=== London Sisters series ===
1. Beneath the Glitter (September 1, 2012)
2. Where Beauty Lies (August 13, 2013)

== Personal life ==
On July 3, 2015, Elle became engaged to singer and songwriter Alex Goot. He proposed on the beach, wrote the song "Unstoppable" about her, and played it during the proposal. On June 19, 2016, they were married at the Bacara Resort in Santa Barbara, California. They have two sons. In September 2024, they announced that they were expected their third child. As of late 2019, the family resides in Nashville, Tennessee.

In 2019, Blair began attending college at Belmont University, majoring in Interior Design. She graduated in May 2022. For three years following her graduation, she worked as an interior designer at Nashville architecture firm Pfeffer Torode. In early 2023, she announced that she had accepted a position as an adjunct instructor at the O'More College of Architecture and Design at Belmont.

In April 2024, Blair announced her engagement to Grant Gordon. They were married on September 27, 2024, at the Hermitage Hotel in Nashville, Tennessee. In January 2026, Blair announced that she was pregnant with her first child, a girl, due in July.
