= Sam Tsui =

American musician and YouTuber (born 1989)

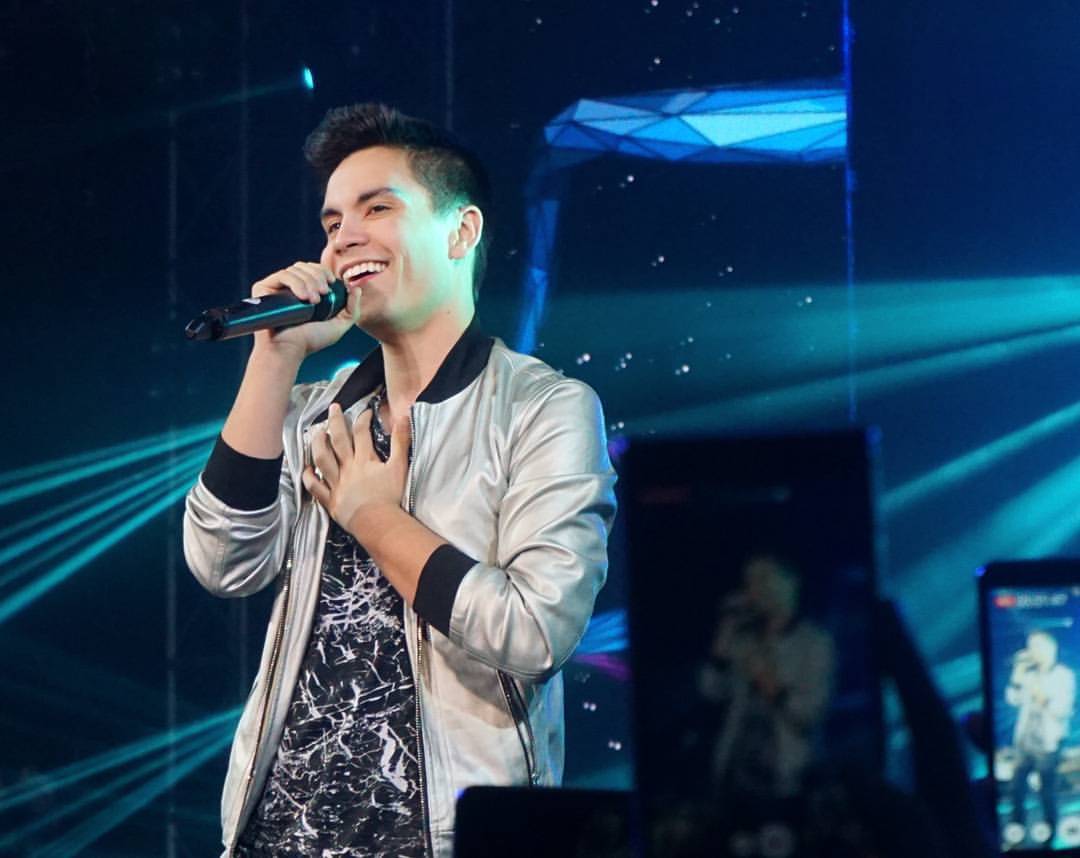
- Samuel Tsui at YouTube FanFest Indonesia 2015
- Born: Samuel Tsui; May 2, 1989 (age 37); Blue Bell, Pennsylvania
- Education: Yale University (BA)
- Occupations: Singer-songwriter, producer
- Spouse: Casey Breves (m. 2016)
- Children: Elaia Tsui-Breves
- Musical career
- Origin: Blue Bell, Pennsylvania, U.S.
- Genres: Pop; soul; acoustic; synthpop
- Instruments: Vocals; piano; synthesizer; glockenspiel
- Years active: 2008–present
- Labels: Mud Hut Digital; NoodleHouse; Sh-K-Boom
- Website: samtsui.com

Samuel Tsui (born May 2, 1989) is an American singer, songwriter and video producer. He rose to fame as an internet celebrity known for doing covers and musical medleys of songs by pop artists. He has since released original songs and expanded to mashups.

Tsui frequently collaborates with YouTuber and childhood friend Kurt Hugo Schneider. Their one-man a cappella videos have been described by Time as a combination of Glee and Attack of the Clones.

As of June 2021, Tsui had received over 3.18 million subscribers.

== Early life and education ==
Tsui was born on May 2, 1989. His father was from Hong Kong and of Cantonese descent, while his mother is an American from Iowa. He has one brother. He grew up in Blue Bell, Pennsylvania, a street away from Kurt Schneider, his producer and accompanist, with whom he attended Wissahickon High School. Tsui attended weekend Chinese school as a child and can speak some Cantonese.

Tsui attended Yale University, where he was a member of Davenport College and The Duke's Men of Yale, an all-male acappella group. He graduated from Yale with a major in Classics (Greek) in 2011.

== Career ==
=== 2009–2010: Career beginnings ===
Tsui appeared on ABC World News on October 28, 2009, singing The Jackson 5's "I'll Be There". He went on to perform on The Bonnie Hunt Show in November of the same year, where he was interviewed and performed Whitney Houston's "I Wanna Dance with Somebody (Who Loves Me)". He also appeared on It's On with Alexa Chung, singing Journey's "Don't Stop Believin'" for the cast of American television series Glee.

Kurt Schneider produced the musical web series College Musical, a parody of the High School Musical film series, in fall of 2008. Four episodes were released, with Tsui playing the lead role of Cooper. Following the popularity of the series, it was announced that a film would be made based on the series. College Musical: The Movie premiered online in September 2014.

In 2010, Tsui released his first cover album, The Covers. The album, released on February 9, 2010, features covers of hits from Michael Jackson, Journey, Beyoncé, Jason Mraz, and Lady Gaga among other artists. On February 22, 2010, Tsui appeared on The Oprah Winfrey Show with his producer Kurt Schneider. The two were interviewed, and Tsui performed his medley of Michael Jackson songs. In November 2010, Tsui collaborated with fellow YouTube singer Christina Grimmie, singing "Just a Dream", which is the most viewed video on the YouTube channel "KurtHugoSchneider", with more than 200 million views. On December 2, 2010, Tsui gave an interview on The Ellen DeGeneres Show and performed a mashup of Katy Perry's "Firework" and Bruno Mars' "Grenade" with Schneider.

=== 2011–2012: YouTube and rise in popularity ===
In 2011, Tsui debuted his own YouTube channel, apart from his collaboration with Kurt Schneider. On February 3, 2011, Tsui was featured on Britney Spears' official website, along with his cover of "Hold It Against Me".

In March 2011, lyrics from Tsui's song "Start Again" was featured in the novel Seeker by Andy Frankham-Allen.

Tsui was mentioned three times by Tom Hanks when he addressed the Yale class of 2011. Tsui was also featured in the 2010 Yale Admissions video. The video, entitled "That's Why I Chose Yale", reveals information about the college with students and admission officers breaking out into song across the campus. In 2017, he co-starred in a new admissions video entitled "That's Why I Toured Yale".

In fall 2011, Tsui was a digital correspondent for the third season of NBC's a capella competition show, The Sing-Off. He recorded a "Judges Medley" that included Sara Bareilles' "Love Song", Ben Folds' "Gone" and Shawn Stockman's (Boyz II Men) "On Bended Knee".

=== 2013–present: Album, tours, future projects ===
Tsui released his first full-length original album, Make It Up, in May 2013 after a raising more than $64,000 through the crowdfunding site Kickstarter. The project was produced by Kurt Schneider.

In summer 2013, Tsui and Schneider toured across Canada and the US with Alex Goot, Against the Current, Landon Austin, Luke Conard, and King the Kid.

Tsui continues to make covers of popular music on his YouTube channel while also collaborating with other YouTubers. In September 2013, Sam published a duet with Elle Winter entitled "Unsinkable (Music Is Medicine)" online. The proceeds of the single went towards pediatric cancer research as a part of the Music Is Medicine's Donate a Song project.

Tsui's vocals were featured in a promotional video for Coca-Cola that premiered on January 14, 2014. In 2013, Kurt Hugo Schneider and Coca-Cola teamed up to create music videos featuring creative covers of two 2011 hits namely Calvin Harris' "Feel So Close" and Of Monsters and Men's "Little Talks" for a campaign called "The Sounds of AHH". The commercial edits of both premiered on the inaugural episode of season 13 of American Idol on January 14, 2014, on FOX with "Feel So Close" featuring the vocals of Tsui whereas Schneider makes music playing only Coca-Cola bottles, glasses and cans.

In 2016, Tsui starred in an episode of Bones as collegiate acappella singing group member Jake Eisenberg.

In 2021, on the tenth anniversary of his and Grimmie's release of their "Just a Dream" cover with Schneider, Sam and Kurt rerecorded their parts of the song while keeping Christina's original portion in memory of her murder in 2016. The song was noticeably sadder in tone and included a clip from an interview of Christina in the opening and a clip of her closing one of her old videos with a thank you at the end. The duo performed the reimagined version at a benefit concert for the Christina Grimmie Foundation on June 15, 2021.

== Personal life ==
On April 15, 2016, Tsui posted a coming out video on his YouTube channel in which he announced that he is gay and in a long-term relationship with fellow musician and collaborator Casey Breves. They met while they were both at Yale (Tsui a freshman and Breves a junior) and were both part of an a cappella group on campus. The couple got married on April 16, 2016. They have adopted a daughter, named Elaia.

== Awards and nominations ==
| Year | Award | Category | Recipient | Result |
|---|---|---|---|---|
| 2015 | Dahsyatnya Awards | Outstanding Guest Star | Himself (shared with Kurt Hugo Schneider) | Nominated |
| 2015 | The Shorty Awards | Best YouTube Musician | Himself | Nominated |
| 2015 | Teen Choice Awards | Choice Web Star: Music | Himself | Nominated |
| 2020 | The Shorty Awards | Best YouTube Musician | Himself | Nominated |

== Filmography ==
=== Television ===
| Year | Title | Role | Notes |
|---|---|---|---|
| 2016 | Bones | Jake Eisenberg | Guest Cast (The Strike in the Chord; Season 11 Ep.16) |
