= Madilyn Bailey =

American singer and songwriter (born 1992)

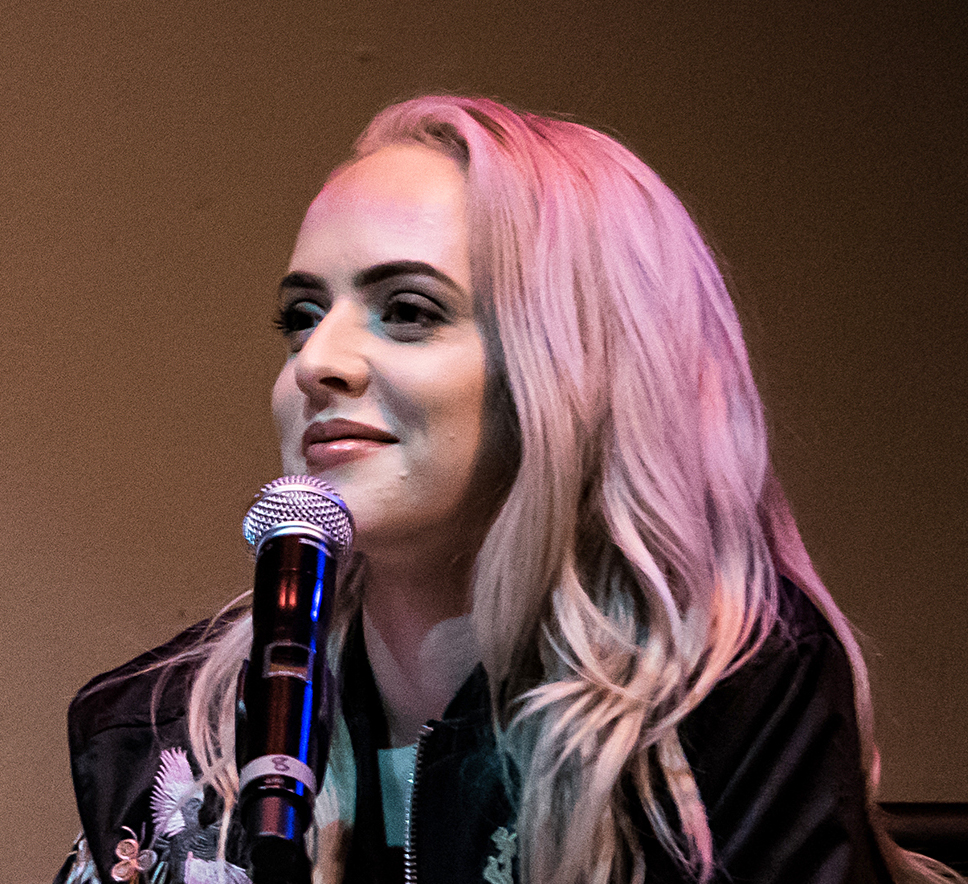
- Madilyn in 2016

Background information
- Born: Madilyn Bailey Wold; September 2, 1992 (age 34); Boyceville, Wisconsin, US
- Genre: Pop
- Occupations: Singer; songwriter; musician; YouTuber
- Instruments: Vocals; guitar; ukulele; piano; keyboards; bass guitar; drums
- Years active: 2008–present
- Labels: Madilyn Bailey Music; PlayOn; Keep Your Soul Records
- Spouse: James Benrud (m. 2014)
- Website: madilyn.net
- Children: 1

Madilyn Bailey Wold (born September 2, 1992), commonly known as Madilyn Bailey and Madilyn, is an American singer, songwriter, musician, and YouTube personality. She has appeared on multiple TV live shows in France to promote her cover singles and she also promoted her original single "Tetris" on the American TV show Today in 2018. As of November 2026, she has about 9.48 million subscribers on YouTube.

Her debut original EP Bad Habit was released in 2012. She released her first studio album Muse Box in 2015 through PlayOn/Warner Music France. Her second original EP, Wiser, was released independently in July 2016.

She held her first headlining show in Paris in 2018 and her first headlining full-band tour in China in 2019; she has also toured in the US and Canada twice with Boyce Avenue as a special guest.

== Early life ==
Madilyn Bailey was born in Boyceville, Wisconsin, to Greg Wold, who works for an advertising firm, and Heidi Wold. She has five siblings. Bailey began to play music and write songs at the age of seven. She played in the marching band of Boyceville High School and graduated in 2011. Before becoming an artist, Bailey worked as a certified nursing assistant.

== Career ==
Madilyn Bailey began her career shortly before graduating from high school by covering popular songs and posting them on YouTube, gathering over 100 million views. In 2012, Bailey joined Keep Your Soul Records to assist with the production of her material and moved to Los Angeles in 2013.

Bailey toured the United States and Canada with Boyce Avenue in the second half of 2013. She later described it by saying "It was an amazing experience being on the road for the first time". She has stated that she has been inspired by Michelle Branch and Kina Grannis.

In 2015, her rendition of the song "Titanium", originally by David Guetta and Sia, gained airplay on Virgin Radio in France. This led to a recording contract with PlayOn in France, a label of Warner Music Group. The song charted in France and Belgium—as did the follow-up, a cover of Imagine Dragons' "Radioactive". In October 2015, Bailey released an album of covers in France, entitled Muse Box, supported by the single "Rude" feat. Flula. A fourth single, a cover of Cher's "Believe", appeared in early 2016.

In July 2016, she released a five track-EP of original material entitled Wiser.

In 2016, her cover of David Guetta and Sia's "Titanium" was featured on the Australian TV series Wanted.

She was picked in April 2018 as Elvis Duran's Artist of the Month. She was featured on NBC's Today show hosted by Hoda Kotb and Kathie Lee Gifford, broadcast nationally in the United States on April 20, 2018, where Bailey performed a live version of her single "Tetris".

In 2018, her original song "Drunk on a Feeling" was featured on the American action-drama TV series Station 19.

In 2021, Madilyn appeared on the 16th season of America's Got Talent, performing an original song made out of hate comments, which had gained over 20 million views on YouTube. In her audition, she received 4 yeses from the judges. She moved onto the top 36, to perform a cover of David Guetta and Sia's "Titanium" in the quarter-final 1.

== Personal life ==
In 2014, Bailey married James Benrud. In June 2023 she announced that she and Benrud were expecting their first child together. On November 15, 2023, Bailey gave birth to a daughter. In 2021, Bailey was diagnosed with stage 4 endometriosis.

Bailey is dyslexic.

== Awards and nominations ==
Music Awards
Year	Association	Category	Work	Result
2014	Streamy Awards	Best Cover Song	"Wake Me Up"	Nominated
2015	NRJ Music Awards	International Revelation of the Year	—	Nominated
2017	Streamy Awards	Influencer Campaign	"Rise to the Occasion" (Parts of DiGiorno)	Nominated

== Discography ==
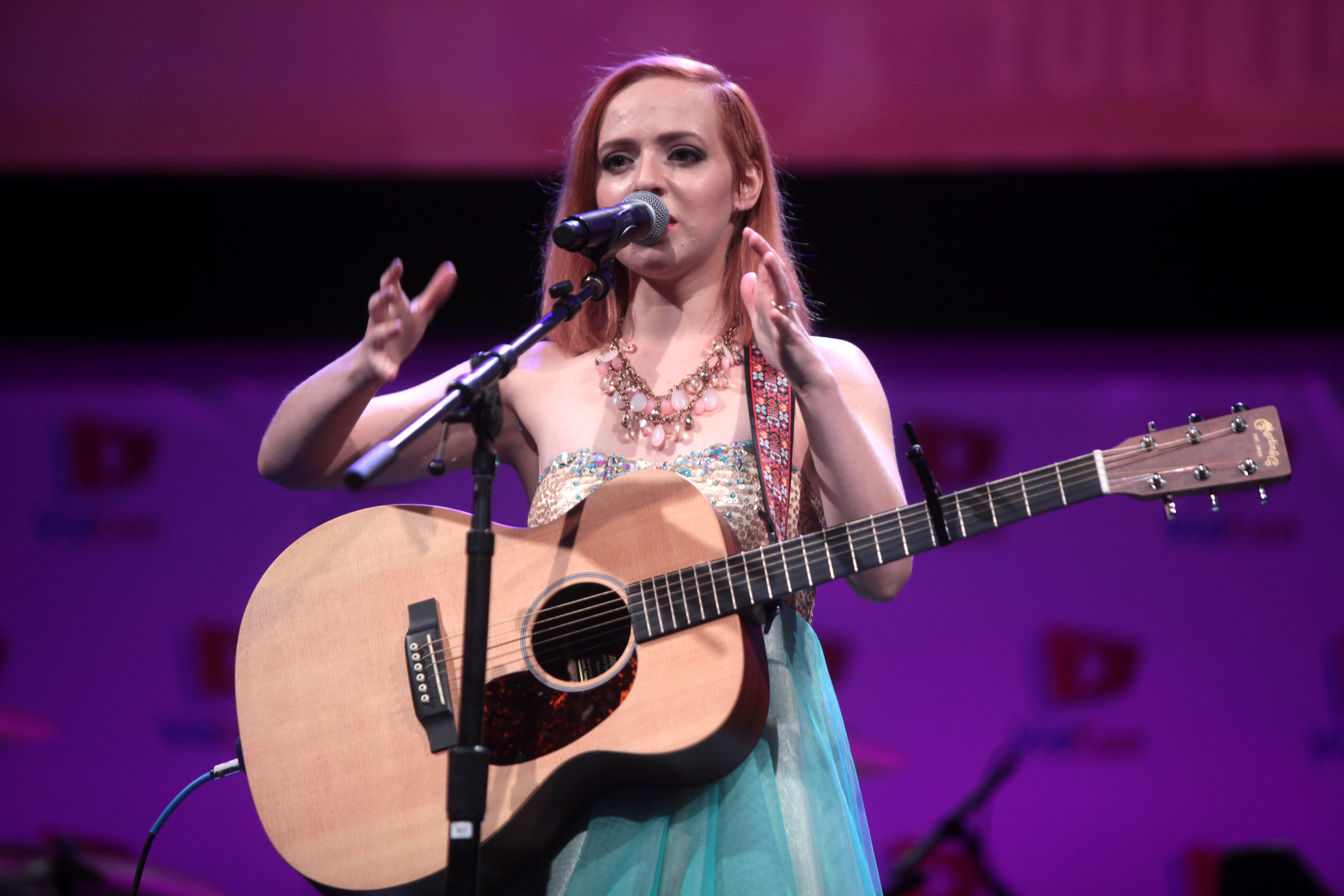
Bailey performing in 2015

=== Cover albums ===
Title	Album details	Peak positions		
Title	Album details	BEL (Fl)	BEL (Wa)	FR
Muse Box	Released: October 2, 2015; Label: PlayOn, Warner Music France, Madilyn Bailey Music; Formats: CD, download	81	26	24

=== Cover singles ===
Year	Title	Peak positions			Notes	Album
Year	Title	BEL (Fl)	BEL (Wa)	FR	Notes	Album
2015	"Titanium"	18	4	13	Cover of David Guetta featuring Sia	Muse Box
2015	"Radioactive"	—	42	36	Cover of Imagine Dragons	Muse Box
2015	"Rude" (featuring Flula)	—	29 (Ultratip*)	84	Cover of Magic!	Muse Box
2016	"Believe"	—	—	125	Cover of Cher	Muse Box

*Did not appear in the official Belgian Ultratop 50 charts, but rather in the bubbling under Ultratop charts.

=== Original EPs ===
Title	Album details
Bad Habit	Released: May 2, 2012; Label: Keep Your Soul Records; Formats: CD, download
Wiser	Released: July 12, 2016; Label: Madilyn Bailey Music; Formats: CD, download

=== Original singles ===
Year	Title	Distributor	Writer(s)	Producer(s)	Album	Notes
2016	"Wiser"	Stem	Oh, Hush!, Drew Lawrence, Jaden Michaels	Oh, Hush!	Wiser	
2018	"Tetris"	Stem	Madilyn Bailey Wold, Jacob Ames Chatelain, London Jackson Glorfield, Mick Coogan	X Lovers	—	
2018	"Drunk on a Feeling"	Stem	Madilyn Bailey Wold, Daniel Burke	Daniel Burke	—	
2019	"Red Ribbon"	Stem	Madilyn Bailey Wold, Lauren Christy, Jon Levine	Joseph Barba	—	
2019	"Are We Falling in Love"	Stem	Madilyn Bailey Wold, Christo Bowman, Courtney Ballard	Courtney Ballard, Joseph Barba	—	
2019	"All My Oxygen"	Stem	Madilyn Bailey Wold, Nikki Flores, Justin Gray	Prince Fox, Brian Malouf, Justin Gray	—	
2019	"Tastes Like Karma"	Stem	Madilyn Bailey Wold, London Jackson Glorfield, Jacob Ames Chatelain, Mick Coogan	Joel Manduke	—	
2020	"Wisconsin"	AWAL	Madilyn Bailey Wold, Saint Claire, Tienus, Clifford Goilo	Clifford Goilo, Joseph Barba	—	
2020	"小鱼 Little Fish (bilingual version)"	Stem	Madilyn Bailey Wold, Sam Tsui, Casey Breves	Sam Tsui	Little Fish	*Available on NetEase
2021	"How Good We Had It"	Stem	Madilyn Bailey Wold, Hannah Wilson, Sam Merrifield	Sam Merrifield	—	
2021	"Miss Anonymous"	Stem	Madilyn Bailey Wold, Saint Claire, Kelly Craige, Clifford Goilo	Clifford Goilo, Saint Claire	—	
2021	"View"	Stem	Madilyn Bailey Wold, Mikal Blue, Johan Lindbrandt	Mikal Blue, Johan Lindbrandt, Joel Maduke	—	
2021	"shine your diamond heart"	Stem	Madilyn Bailey Wold	Clifford Goilo, Joseph Barba	—	
2021	"Crown"	TuneCore	Madilyn Bailey Wold	Jason Pitts	—	
2022	"My Worst"	Stem	Madilyn Bailey Wold, Emi Dragoi, LIlV	Emi Dragoi	—	
2022	"Digital Age"	Stem	Madilyn Bailey Wold, Catalina Schwighauser, Clifford Golio	Clifford Golio	—	
2022	"Digital Age (Acoustic Version"	TuneCore	Madilyn Bailey Wold, Catalina Schwighauser, Clifford Golio	Joseph Barba	—	
2022	"True Crime"	Stem	Madilyn Bailey Wold, Emily-Madelen Aarsheim Harbakk, Olivia "LIIV" Cargile	Bendik Moe Krogh, Gucci Caliente		
2022	"Mister Misfit"	Stem	Madilyn Bailey Wold	Joseph Barba		

=== Writing credits ===
Year	Title	Artist(s)	Album	Credits
2018	"Wallflower"	Whethan	Life of a Wallflower Vol.1	Writer
2021	"Flu"	IU	LILAC	Composer
2021	"Weird Year"	Saint Djuni	Non-album single	Writer

=== Vocal credits ===
Year	Title	Artist(s)	Album
2018	"Alive"	Raffey Cassidy	Vox Lux (Original Motion Picture Soundtrack)
2018	"Your Body Talk"	Raffey Cassidy	Vox Lux (Original Motion Picture Soundtrack)
2018	"Hologram (Smoke and Mirrors)"	Raffey Cassidy	Vox Lux (Original Motion Picture Soundtrack)
2018	"Wallflower"	Whethan	Life of a Wallflower Vol.1
2021	"Flu"	IU	LILAC
2021	"Spellbound (feat. Madame Bizarre)"	LVCRFT	The Return
