= Elvis Duran's Artist of the Month =

Feature on the Today Show

Elvis Duran's Artist of the Month is a segment which ran regularly from 2013 to 2019 on Today with Kathie Lee and Hoda, the fourth hour of NBC's Today. It was fronted by American radio broadcaster Elvis Duran, in which he chose an upcoming solo singer (and at times duos and groups) to spotlight them each month as "Artist(s) of the Month". In certain months, two different artists may be featured during the same month.

During his segment, Duran presented his selected artists, and after a brief interview with the show's hosts Kathie Lee Gifford and Hoda Kotb, the selected artists sang a recent song of their own for Today's national audience. Past artists who have appeared on the segment include American bands like A Great Big World, American Authors, Juice, Los 5, MAGIC GIANT, Midnight Red, Ocean Park Standoff, The Revivalists, Saving Forever, the duos Alexander Jean, Jack & Jack, Lion Babe and Secret Weapons, independent and emerging American artists like Madilyn Bailey, Jon Bellion, Cris Cab, Sabrina Carpenter, Greyson Chance, Jessie Chris, Rachel Crow, Rozzi Crane, Daya, Mikky Ekko, Roy English, Emily Estefan, Ferras, Jordan Fisher, Gallant, Todrick Hall, Olivia Holt, Parson James, Lauren Jenkins, Tori Kelly, Austin Mahone, Kirstin Maldonado, Laura Marano, MAX, Bea Miller, Jake Miller, Spencer Sutherland, VÉRITÉ, Tyler Ward, Elle Winter and Zendaya and more.

Although a big majority of the featured artists were American, Duran made a point of introducing some non-Americans acts as well giving them big exposure in the American markets. Such international artists include Grace, Vance Joy, Conrad Sewell and The Griswolds (Australia), Alessia Cara and Shawn Hook (Canada), Isac Elliot (Finland), AudioDamn! (Germany), Nikki Williams (South Africa), Arlissa, Låpsley, Katy Tiz, Labrinth, Damian McGinty, Aston Merrygold, Tom Walker and the bands MiC LOWRY, New Hope Club (UK) and others.

== List of artists ==
Date	Artist	Song	Type	Country
May 2013	Nikki Williams	"Glowing"	Female	South Africa
June 2013	A Great Big World	"This Is the New Year"	Group	United States
July 2013	Labrinth	"Beneath Your Beautiful" (feat. Emeli Sandé)	Male	United Kingdom
September 2013	Tori Kelly	"Dear No One"	Female	United States
October 2013	Midnight Red	"Take Me Home"	Group	United States
November 2013	Zendaya	"Replay"	Female	United States
May 2014	Katy Tiz	"The Big Bang"	Female	United Kingdom
July 2014	Ferras	"Sing in Tongues"	Male	United States
September 2014	Bebe Rexha	"I Can't Stop Drinking About You"	Female	United States
October 2014	Lipstick Gypsy	"The Cure"	Duo	United States
October 2014	Cris Cab	"Liar Liar"	Male	United States
November 2014	Vance Joy	"Riptide"	Male	Australia
December 2014	Bea Miller	"Young Blood"	Female	United States
March 2015	Los 5	"Poquito Mas"	Group	United States
March 2015	Conrad Sewell	"Start Again"	Male	Australia
April 2015	Rozzi Crane	"Psycho"	Female	United States
April 2015	Mikky Ekko	"Smile"	Male	United States
June 2015	MAX	"Gibberish"	Male	United States
July 2015	Grace	"You Don't Own Me" (feat. G-Eazy)	Female	Australia
July 2015	American Authors	"Best Day of My Life"	Group	United States
August 2015	Austin Mahone	"Dirty Work"	Male	United States
September 2015	Alessia Cara	"Here"	Female	Canada
September 2015	Skylar Stecker	"Crazy Beautiful"	Female	United States
September 2015	Daya	"Hide Away"	Female	United States
October 2015	Todrick Hall	"Wind It Up" (feat. Vonzell Solomon)	Male	United States
November 2015	AudioDamn!	"Radar"	Group	Germany
November 2015	Secret Weapons	"Something New"	Group	United States
December 2015	Tyler Ward	"Yellow Boxes"	Male	United States
January 2016	Ben Rector	"Brand New"	Male	United States
February 2016	Shawn Hook	"Sound of Your Heart"	Male	Canada
February 2016	Greyson Chance	"Hit & Run"	Male	United States
March 2016	The Revivalists	"Wish I Knew You"	Group	United States
April 2016	Låpsley	"Love Is Blind"	Female	United Kingdom
April 2016	Whitney Woerz	"6 Second Love"	Female	United States
May 2016	Isac Elliot	"What About Me"	Male	Finland
May 2016	Laura Marano	"Boombox"	Female	United States
June 2016	Adam Freedman	"Pretty Things"	Male	United States
July 2016	Jordan Fisher	"All About Us"	Male	United States
August 2016	Jon Bellion	"All Time Low"	Male	United States
September 2016	The Griswolds	"Out of My Head"	Group	Australia
October 2016	Lion Babe	"She's a Lady"	Duo	United States
November 2016	Parson James	"Sad Song"	Male	United States
November 2016	Sabrina Carpenter	"Thumbs"	Female	United States
December 2016	Marina Morgan	"Paralyzed"	Female	United States
December 2016	Jake Miller	"Overnight"	Male	United States
January 2017	Gallant	"Weight in Gold"	Male	United States
January 2017	VÉRITÉ	"Phase Me Out"	Female	United States
February 2017	Emily Estefan	"Reigns (Every Night)"	Female	United States
February 2017	Ocean Park Standoff	"Good News"	Group	United States-based (US and English artists)
March 2017	MiC LOWRY	"Oh Lord"	Group	United Kingdom
March 2017	Tom Walker	"Just You and I"	Male	United Kingdom
April 2017	Roy English	"Hotel Pools 01101001"	Male	United States
April 2017	Olivia Holt	"History"	Female	United States
May 2017	MAGIC GIANT	"Set on Fire"	Group	United States
June 2017	Chord Overstreet	"Hold On"	Male	United States
June 2017	Jessie Chris	"Burn"	Female	United States
July 2017	Spencer Sutherland	"Selfish"	Male	United States
July 2017	Kirstin Maldonado	"Break a Little"	Female	United States
August 2017	Saving Forever	"Million Ways"	Group	United States
September 2017	Rachel Crow	"Dime"	Female	United States
October 2017	JOHN.k	"OT"	Male	United States
November 2017	Donna Missal	"Transformer"	Female	United States
January 2018	Jack & Jack	"Beg"	Duo	United States
January 2018	Rayvon Owen	"Gold"	Male	United States
March 2018	Arlissa	"Hearts Ain't Gonna Lie"	Female	United Kingdom
April 2018	Madilyn Bailey	"Tetris"	Female	United States
May 2018	Elle Winter	"One More"	Female	United States
July 2018	Aston Merrygold	"Get Stupid"	Male	United Kingdom
August 2018	Juice	"Sugar"	Group	United States
October 2018	New Hope Club	"Medicine"	Group	United Kingdom
November 2018	Alexander Jean	"Waiting for You"	Duo	United States
February 2019	Lauren Jenkins	"Running Out of Road"	Female	United States
March 2019	Damian McGinty	"Saltwater"	Male	Northern Ireland
