= The Griswolds =

Australian indie rock band

- Origin: Sydney, Australia
- Genres: Alternative dance, indie rock, pop, electronic
- Years active: 2012–2020
- Label: Nottinghill Music Masters
- Past members: Christopher Whitehall; Lachlan West; Daniel Duque-Perez; Tim John; Chris Riley; Robbie Balatincz
- Website: wearethegriswolds.com

The Griswolds were an Australian indie rock band from Sydney. The band cited influences such as Vampire Weekend, MGMT, Kanye West, Devendra Banhart, Of Montreal, and the Beach Boys. The Griswolds signed with Wind-up Records in May 2013 and began recording their debut album shortly after with producer Tony Hoffer. They were named after the fictional family from the Vacation film series.

The band has been inactive since lead singer Chris Whitehall admitted to sexual misconduct with several underage fans in 2020.

== Background ==
The Griswolds formed in February 2012. The band's single "Heart of a Lion", reached No. 12 on the We Are Hunted emerging artists list.

The Griswolds became a Triple J Unearthed feature artist after winning a slot on the 2012 Parklife Festival line-up alongside Passion Pit and The Presets. Their Heart of a Lion EP, released in 2012, received positive reviews, and helped start their touring career. After success touring in their native Australia, the band made their first live appearance in New York City on 11 May 2013 at the Brooklyn Bowl. The band began recording their debut album with producer Tony Hoffer in January 2014.

The official music video for "Red Tuxedo" premiered on the VICE Noisey website on Valentine's Day (14 February), 2014. The band's song "Beware the Dog" is the first song vocalist Chris Whitehall and lead guitarist Daniel Duque-Perez wrote together. Whitehall described it as being "about losing someone we were really close with to heavy drug use. [... It's] about that journey – the good and the bad times."

In March 2015, the band confirmed that once they return to Australia, following their tour alongside Passion Pit, they were going to commence work on their second album.

The first single off their second album, Out of My Head, was released on 12 August 2016. High Times for Low Lives, was released on 11 November 2016.

In September 2016, the band was picked as Elvis Duran's Artist of the Month in the United States and was featured on NBC's Today show hosted by Kathie Lee Gifford and Hoda Kotb and broadcast nationally where they performed live the single "Out of My Head".

On 16 March 2017, Tim John, their bass player, left the band.

On 30 August 2019, the band released "Nice To Meet Ya!", the lead single off of their second EP and first release since 2016.

In September 2020, lead singer Chris Whitehall was accused of sexual misconduct by multiple underage fans. Whitehall apologized and admitted to the allegations, saying "It is with a heavy heart that I am confirming that the statements I have read are true and I am here to take full responsibility and ownership of my actions."

== Discography ==
=== Studio albums ===
Title	Album details	Peak chart positions			
Title	Album details	AUS	US	US Heat.	US Ind.
Be Impressive	Released: 25 August 2014; Label: Relativity, Wind-Up; Formats: CD, LP, digital download	62	197	7	33
High Times for Low Lives	Released: 11 November 2016; Label: Relativity, Wind-Up; Formats: CD, LP, digital download	— (Note: High Times for Low Lives did not enter the Australian ARIA Albums Chart but peaked at number eight on the ARIA Hitseekers Chart.)	—	21	—

=== Extended plays ===
- 2014: Heart of a Lion
- 2020: All My Friends

=== Singles ===
Title	Year	Peak chart positions			Album
Title	Year	AUS Hit.	US Rock	US Alt.	Album
"Heart of a Lion"	2012	—	—	—	Heart of a Lion (EP)
"Beware The Dog"	2014	3	33	18	Be Impressive
"If You Wanna Stay"	2015	—	—	40	Be Impressive
"Out of My Head"	2016	—	—	—	High Times for Low Lives
"Light Me Up" (with Max Styler)	2018	—	—	—	Non-album single
"—" denotes a release that did not chart.

== Awards and accolades ==
- "Beware the Dog" was voted No. 28 on the Triple J Hottest 100, 2014
- "Beware the Dog" was voted No. 4 on the Sirius XM Alt Nation Alt 36 annual countdown
- "Beware the Dog" was nominated by Rolling Stone as Best Video Clip and Single of the year for 2014
- "Beware the Dog" Spent 4 weeks at No. 1 and a total of 16 weeks on the Sirius XM Alt Nation Alt 18 Countdown in 2014
- "Beware the Dog" Was chosen as the 4th best Alternative Rock Single of 2014 by Billboard
- "If You Wanna Stay" Debuted at No. 18 on the Sirius XM Alt Nation Alt 18 countdown the day after the single was released on US radio climbing to No. 17 the following week
- Debut album "Be Impressive" Charted at No. 5 on the USA iTunes Charts
- "Heart of a Lion" was voted No. 141 on the Triple J Hottest 100, 2012
- "Heart of a Lion" charted at No. 12 on the We Are Hunted Emerging Artists chart
- "Mississippi" charted at No. 8 on US college radio's (CMJ) indie chart
- Featured on festival line-ups across the globe
