= Los 5 =

LOS 5
- Origin: Multi-ethnic (Mexico, Argentina and Brazil)
- Genres: Pop/Rap
- Years active: 2014-present
- Members: Juan Pablo Casillas; Matt Rey; Ismael Cano Jr. Hector Rodriguez; Tomas Slemenson
- Past members: Luis Gustavo

Los 5 stylized as LOS 5 is an independent multi-ethnic Latin musical pop/rap band based in Los Angeles with members originating from Mexico, Argentina and Brazil and now based in the United States. The lead musical vocals is by Juan Pablo Casillas and the rap parts are performed by Matt Rey. The band sings in English and Spanish. Most members met when they were studying music at Hollywood's Musician's Institute forming the band The Wavelength. The band is managed by talent executive Terry Anzaldo. Consequently the band was renamed LOS 5.

In March 2015, the band was picked as Elvis Duran's Artist of the Month and was featured on NBC's Today show hosted by Kathie Lee Gifford and Hoda Kotb and broadcast nationally where they performed live their single "Poquito Mas". The band released their EP Meet Los Five EP in 2016.

== Members ==
- Juan Pablo Casillas - Lead vocals - Born in 1994 in Aguascalientes, Mexico, he immigrated to the United States when he was 13. He studied at the Musician's Institute in Hollywood
- Matt Rey - Rap vocals - Born in 1993 in Buenos Aires, Argentina, he immigrated to the United States when he was 8. He studied acting at the Stella Adler Academy
- Ismael Cano Jr. - Lead guitar and backing vocals - Born in Querétaro, Mexico in 1993, he immigrated to the United States when he was 18. He is a classically trained musician in concertos and a symphonic percussionist. He studied Crystal Cathedral Performing Arts High School, at Fullerton College and at the Musician's Institute in Hollywood where he learned guitar.
- Hector Rodriguez - Bass - Born in 1997 in Monterrey, Mexico and moved to Los Angeles, California when he was 15. He graduated from Burbank High School and is a cousin of band guitarist Ismael Cano Jr.
- Tomas Slemenson - Drums. Born in 1994 in Sao Paulo, Brazil, he moved to Hollywood, California to study at the Musicians Institute when he was 19 where he studied drums and percussion.

Former members

- Luis Gustavo - Drums. Original drummer of the band replaced later by Tomas Slemenson.

== Discography ==
=== EPs ===
- 2016: Meet Los Five EP

=== Singles / Videography ===
- 2014: "Mañana"
- 2015: "Poquito Mas"
- 2016: "Do For Love"
- 2016: "Kings & Queens"
- 2017: "Acapulco"
- 2017: "Satisfaction"
- 2017: "Ladrón" (feat. Maffio)
