= Secret Weapon =

Secret Weapon or Secret Weapons may refer to:

== Literature ==
- Alex Rider: Secret Weapon, a 2003 short story and 2018 collection
- Las armas secretas, a 1959 short story collection by Julio Cortázar
- The Last of the Jedi: Secret Weapon, a 2007 book and the seventh in the Last of the Jedi series

== Music ==
- Secret Weapon (group), an 80s R&B band
- Secret Weapons (band), a 2010s American musical band
- Secret Weapon (album), a 2007 MxPx album and its title track

== Other uses ==
- Secret Weapon (film), a 1990 historical film
- "Secret Weapons", a second-season Danny Phantom episode
- "Secret Weapons" (Star Wars: The Clone Wars)

== See also ==
- Secret Weapons of World War II (disambiguation)
- Concealed carry
