= Cris Cab =

American singer-songwriter from Florida

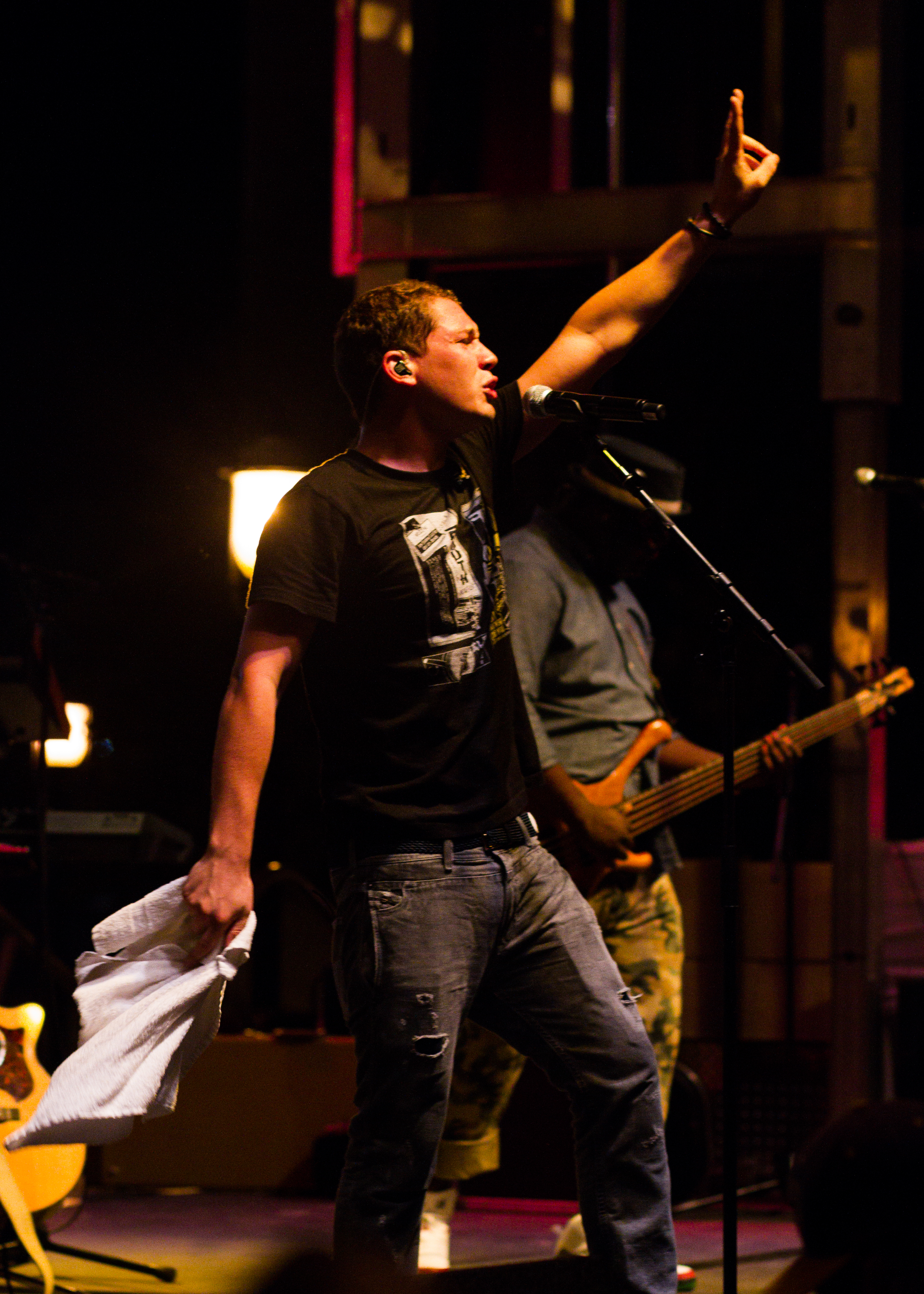
- Cab performing in August 2014

Background information
- Born: Cristian Cabrerizo; January 21, 1993 (age 33); Miami, Florida, United States
- Genres: Pop, reggae, soul, fusion
- Occupation: Singer-songwriter
- Years active: 2011 – present
- Labels: CAB; EMI; Island; Def Jam; I Am Other; 26
- Website: www.criscab.com

Cristian Cabrerizo (born January 21, 1993), better known by his stage name Cris Cab is an American singer-songwriter. Cab has released a number of EPs, and has become well known with his 2013 international hit "Liar Liar", produced and written by Pharrell Williams. He was signed to Island Def Jam Records and Island Records. His songs are a fusion of pop, reggae, and soul.

== Career ==
Cris Cab started music at a very young age. Born to Cuban parents in Miami, Florida, he spent summers in The Bahamas broadening his music tastes. At 14, his father bought him his first studio session. At 15, his early demos caught the attention of Pharrell Williams who met him and mentored him. Hugely popular online, articles appeared on entertainment blogs such as Perez Hilton, Just Jared as well as the website of Billboard. Cris Cab also opened for various acts including T-Pain, Matisyahu, Rebelution, Gym Class Heroes and O.A.R.

Signing a management deal, he released his debut Foreword EP in 2011 and his original single "Good Girls". Wyclef Jean met him on tour and became a second mentor to him and recorded "She's So Fly" with him.

In 2012 Cris Cab released a full-length mixtape, Echo Boom featuring production and collaboration by Pharrell Williams, Mavado, Wyclef Jean, Melanie Fiona, Shaggy, Daytona, Marc Roberge (of O.A.R.) and was signed to Mercury Records. His single "Good Girls (Don't Grow on Trees)" was written by Pharrell Williams and produced by Wyclef Jean, and features a rap section by Big Sean. His song "Paradise (On Earth)" was featured on the NBA 2K14 soundtrack.

His international fame came with "Liar, Liar" released on Island Def Jam Records that has charted in Germany, France, Netherlands and Belgium. The release was accompanied by a music video with cameo appearances by Pharrell Williams.

His full-length album Where I Belong was released on April 7, 2014, in Europe, and is to be released on May 21 in the United Kingdom. A United States full-length release is due this summer.

In October 2014, he was picked as Elvis Duran's Artist of the Month and was featured on NBC's Today show hosted by Kathy Lee Gifford and Hoda Kotb, where he performed live his single "Liar Liar".

In 2015, he released the song "Englishman In New York", originally performed by Sting, and reached number 13 on the France Top 40 chart.

Cab returned to music in 2017 with "All of the Girls" featuring Pitbull.

In 2018, Cab released "Laurent Perrier", a song featuring Latin artist Farruko. He performed the song at the official FIFA World Cup viewing event in Berlin, Germany prior to the country's final game in the tournament. As a follow-up, Cab released the single "Just Wanna Love You" featuring, J Balvin. At the time of its release (September 2018), Balvin was the #2 ranked artist in the world streaming on Spotify, behind Drake.

== Discography ==
=== Albums ===
Album	Peak positions					
Album	BEL (Fl)	BEL (Wa)	FRA	GER	NED	SWI
Where I Belong: Released: September 2, 2014 (US); Record label: Universal Music, Island Def Jam, EMI	72	120	54	87	77	26

=== EPs ===
Title	EP details	Notes
Foreword EP	Type: EP; Released: June 7, 2011; Record label: CMG 26 Records	No. / Title / Length; 1. / "Good Girls" / 3:03; 2. / "Better Off Running" / 3:38; 3. / "Take You Away" / 3:57; 4. / "No Hatred" / 4:16; 5. / "Life Goes On" / 2:43; 6. / "How Was I Supposed to Know" / 3:25; 7. / "When You're Around (Bonus)" / 3:41
Echo Boom EP	Type: EP; Released: February 2, 2012; Record label: 26 Records	No. / Title / Length; 1. / "Echo Boom (feat. Pharrell Williams)" / 2:32; 2. / "Turn You On (feat. Melanie Fiona and Shaggy)" / 3:43; 3. / "Angels and Demons" / 4:03; 4. / "Gypsys on the Boulevard" / 3:57; 5. / "Going Home (feat. Marc Roberge)" / 3:42; 6. / "In My Dreams" / 3:19
Rise EP	Type: EP; Released: October 9, 2012; Record label: The Island Def Jam Music Group	No. / Title / Length; 1. / "Paradise (On Earth)" / 3:46; 2. / "She's So Fly (feat. Wyclef Jean)" / 3:47; 3. / "Face to Face" / 3:44; 4. / "Good Girls (Don't Grow on Trees) (feat. Big Sean)" / 3:57; 5. / "White Lingerie" / 3:21

=== Mixtapes ===
Title
Red Road
EP details
- Type: EP
- Released: April 16, 2013
- Record label: CAB Music
Notes

No.	Title	Length
1.	"Colors (feat. Mike Posner)"	3:21
2.	"When We Were Young"	3:13
3.	"Heaven"	3:15
4.	"Another Love (feat. Wyclef Jean)"	2:56
5.	"Livin on Sunday"	3:21
6.	"History"	4:21
7.	"The Fire (feat. The Green)"	4:28
8.	"Wild"	3:20

=== Other releases ===
- 2012: Cris Cab - Live... In the Moment, (recorded at the Grand Central, Miami)

=== Singles ===
Year	Title	Peak positions									Album
Year	Title	AUT	BEL (Fl)	BEL (Wa)	FRA	GER	ITA	NED Top 40	NED Top 100	SWI	Album
2012	"Good Girls (Don't Grow on Trees)" (feat. Big Sean)	—	—	—	—	—	—	—	—	—	Where I Belong
2013	"Liar Liar"	9	32	22	5	9	6	9	14	8	Where I Belong
2014	"Loves Me Not"	—	55*	52*	—	—	—	33	93	—	Where I Belong
2015	"Englishman in New York" (feat. Tefa & Moox, Willy William)	—	—	34	16	—	—	—	—	—	Non-album singles
2016	"Bada Bing" (feat. Youssoupha)	—	41	18	91	—	—	—	—	—	Non-album singles
2017	"All of the Girls" (feat. Pitbull)	—	60	—	—	—	—	—	—	—	Non-album singles
2018	"Just Wanna Love You" (feat. J Balvin)	—	—	—	—	—	—	—	—	—	Non-album singles

*Did not appear in the official Belgian Ultratop 50 charts, but rather in the bubbling under Ultratip charts. For Ultratip peaks, added 50 positions to arrive at an equivalent Ultratop position

==== Others ====
- 2011: "Good Girls"
- 2012: "Face to Face"
- 2012: "Echo Boom", (feat. Pharrell Williams)
- 2012: "She's So Fly" (feat. Wyclef Jean)
- 2012: "White Lingerie"
- 2013: "When We Were Young"
- 2013: "Another Love", (feat. Wyclef Jean)
- 2013: "Colors", (feat. Mike Posner)
- 2013: "Paradise (On Earth)"
- 2014: "Loves Me Not"
- 2017: "Together"
- 2017: "Rest of My Life"
- 2018: "Laurent Perrier" (feat. Farruko & Kore)
- 2020: "Your Love" (feat. Irina Rimes )

==== Featured in ====
Year	Title	Peak positions		Album
Year	Title	BEL (Wa)	FRA	Album
2016	"Paradise" (Nehuda feat. Cris Cab)	49	3	Non-album single
2016	"Paris" (Willy William feat. Cris Cab)	—*	106	Non-album single
