= Jessie Chris =

American singer-songwriter

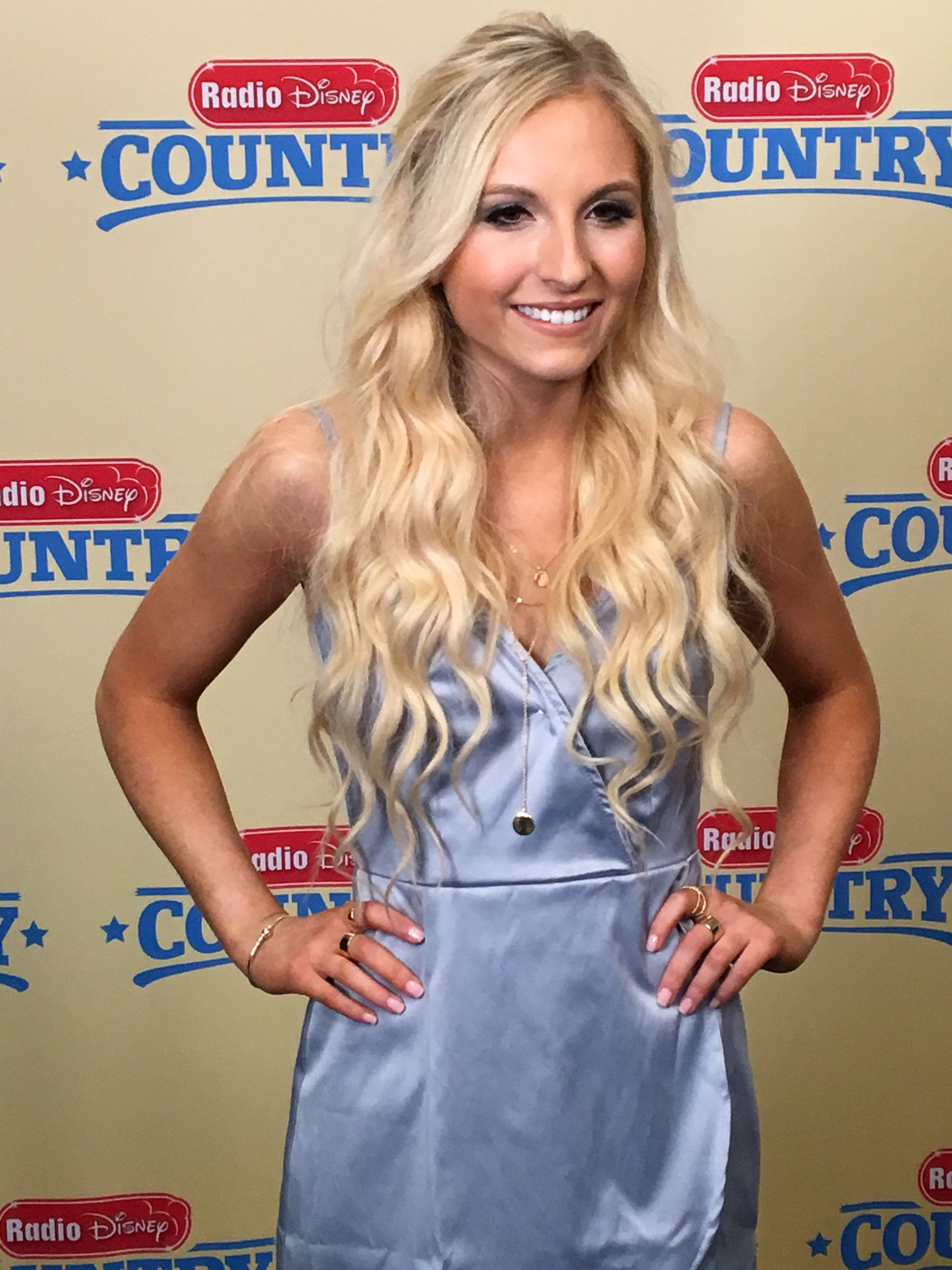
- Jessie Chris in 2018

Background information
- Born: May 31, 1997 (age 28); Boston, Massachusetts, United States
- Genres: Country
- Occupation: Singer
- Years active: 2011–present
- Website: www.jessiechris.com

Jessie Chris (born May 31, 1997) is an American country musician and published author who was named 2018 BillBoard Artist To Watch and Elvis Duran's TODAY Show Artist of The Month.

== Career ==
Jessie Chris recorded a duet titled "Bodyguard" with New Kids on the Block member Danny Wood, which released early 2019.

In December 2018 Jessie Chris was named one of Nickelodeon's new "Fresh Faces" and the music video for her single "ROME" was added to rotation on Nick Music TV Station

In October 2018, Jessie Chris released her first children's book "DREAMS".

In September 2018, TLC Network Honored Jessie with an award for her efforts to reduce bullying in schools at the Give A Little TLC Awards in New York City.

In January 2018, Jessie Chris was named BillBoard Artist to Watch

In June 2017, she was picked as Elvis Duran's Artist of the Month appearing on NBC's Today show with Hoda Kotb and Kathie Lee Gifford performing her hit "Burn" live on the program.

In April 2018, Jessie was named one of the faces of The Ad Council's national Anti-Bullying & Harassment Campaign #BeMore

On August 9, 2018, Jessie released her empowerment anthem single "ROME" which she first performed as the featured artist at the 2018 Gracie Awards. "ROME" was written by Jessie Chris, Summer Overstreet and David Spencer.

Jessie released her second album "In It For You" on January 5, 2018.

At just 18 years old, Jessie Chris was one of the youngest artists to perform at the 2015 Country Music Association Festival. In 2015, she recorded a new version of 98 Degrees' 1999 song "I Do (Cherish You)" with Jeff Timmons, a member of the band. She has opened for several artists including Luke Bryan, Chris Young and John Rich; and has performed with Billy Ray Cyrus and Jeff Timmons. In 2015 Chris performed at the Country Music Hall of Fame.

Her debut album Wildfire was recorded at Dark Horse Studios in Nashville and her single "In the Meantime" was released to radio nationwide on May 16, 2016. The first week it was out it was the No. 6 song on the Play MPE Top Country Chart. "In the Meantime" made its debut on Radio Disney in August and Chris became a member of the Radio Disney Country Family on September 24, 2016.

Chris released her single "1963" to radio on November 9, 2016, and reached No. 4 on the PlayMPE Country Top 20 Chart.

On April 14, 2017, she released her single "Burn" to online music retailers worldwide after releasing it to radio on March 27, 2017. Chris co-wrote "Burn" with producer David Spencer.

In July 2017, Chris was invited to attend the 2017 National Scout Jamboree to play immediately after President Donald Trump's speech. She played a variety of songs including her April 2017 single "Burn".

== Popular culture ==
Chris was one of the artists to record Disney's song "The Human Race" which hit No. 4 on the iTunes Hot Tracks Chart on November 29, 2016. Other artists on the track include Kelsea Ballerini, LOCASH, and Scotty McCreery.

Chris was also one of the faces of Disney's #choosekindness National Anti-Bullying Campaign. Chris was featured in a three-part anti-bullying feature by AOL on December 14, 2016

In 2017, Chris became a face of Sylvania LEDVANCE's "Be the Light Campaign".

== Discography ==
=== Albums ===
- 2016: Wildfire
- 2018: In It For You

=== Singles ===
- 2016: "In the Meantime"
- 2016: "1963"
- 2017: "Burn"
