= The Star (2017 film) =

2017 American animated film

- Theatrical release poster
- Directed by: Timothy Reckart
- Screenplay by: Carlos Kotkin
- Story by: Carlos Kotkin; Simon Moore
- Produced by: Jenni Magee Cook
- Starring: Steven Yeun; Gina Rodriguez; Zachary Levi; Keegan-Michael Key; Kelly Clarkson; Patricia Heaton; Kristin Chenoweth; Tracy Morgan; Tyler Perry; Oprah Winfrey
- Edited by: Pam Ziegenhagen
- Music by: John Paesano
- Production companies: Sony Pictures Animation; Walden Media; Affirm Films; The Jim Henson Company; Franklin Entertainment
- Distributed by: Sony Pictures Releasing (Note: While Sony Pictures Animation is the film's copyright holder, the logo for Columbia Pictures appears in the film's promotional material, but not in the film's opening titles.)
- Release dates: November 12, 2017 (Regency Village Theater); November 17, 2017 (United States)
- Running time: 86 minutes
- Country: United States
- Language: English
- Budget: $20 million
- Box office: $63.6 million

The Star (also known as The Star: The Story of the First Christmas) is a 2017 American animated biblical film directed by Timothy Reckart, and written by Carlos Kotkin from a story by Kotkin and Simon Moore. Set on the Nativity of Jesus and an original concept by Tom Sheridan, the film features the voices of Steven Yeun, Gina Rodriguez, Zachary Levi, Keegan-Michael Key, Kelly Clarkson, Patricia Heaton, Kristin Chenoweth, Tracy Morgan, Tyler Perry, and Oprah Winfrey.

The Star released in the United States on November 17, 2017, by Sony Pictures Releasing. The film received mixed reviews from critics and grossed $63 million worldwide against a budget of $20 million. It received a nomination for Best Original Song ("The Star" by Mariah Carey) at the 75th Golden Globe Awards.

== Plot ==
In "9 months B.C.", Mary is visited by an angel telling her she will bear the Messiah. A pygmy jerboa named Abby overhears and tells the other animals as a star begins glowing brightly in the night.

Six months later, a young donkey is tired of milling wheat and wishes to join a traveling royal caravan so that he may feel important. An older donkey helps him escape the miller who owns them, and the young donkey ends up with an injured ankle at the house of Mary and Joseph, who have just celebrated their wedding. Mary takes the donkey in and names him Boaz, and reveals to Joseph that she is pregnant, with Joseph accepting Mary's situation after receiving his own vision from the angel. During this time, Bo and his dove friend Dave plot to escape despite Mary's kindness, but end up staying three more months.

Meanwhile, the three wise men and their camels, Felix, Cyrus, and Deborah, arrive at the home of King Herod. The wise men reveal their gifts of gold, frankincense, and myrrh, but when they reveal that it is actually for the "new King", he sends them on their way to meet him, but secretly sends his royal hunter and his two dogs, Thaddeus and Rufus, to find and kill the new King.

As Mary and Joseph leave Nazareth to go to Bethlehem for a census, Bo and Dave try another escape, but are confronted by the dogs, who knew of the home by interrogating Abby. After learning that Mary and Joseph are not home, the hunter and his dogs leave to look for them. Feeling guilty, Bo decides to warn them with Dave in tow. Along the way, they meet a friendly sheep named Ruth who left her flock when she saw the star. They catch up to Mary and Joseph in time to warn them and hide them in a market place where the hunter ties up his dogs. Bo releases the cart Mary and Joseph were using to roll down and cause a chain reaction that knocks the hunter down a well. However, he creates severe damage to the market in the process, and Joseph, unaware of the danger, tells Bo to leave.

Bo and Dave go searching for the royal caravan. Upon finding it, Bo realizes that Mary is important to him and tells Dave, who admits he is not upset and that he just wants Bo to be happy with his decision. Together, the two return and make up with Ruth, and then convince a frustrated Joseph to talk to Mary. Mary admits that it has been difficult for her and that she is afraid of the importance of the baby, and they make up when Mary begins having contractions. They arrive at Bethlehem, where Joseph is unable to find an inn for Mary. The miller, who happens to be in Bethlehem, recognises and abducts Bo with Dave and Ruth leaving to rescue him. The wise men arrive as well, but the camels, who are aware of Herod's plot, are left tied to a post.

The miller ties Bo in a stable, where he mingles with the animals. They reveal that they have not been able to sleep because the star's bright light has been shining through on their manger for nine months. Realizing that this is where Mary is supposed to give birth, the animals help Bo escape and he catches up with Dave and Ruth while spotting the hunter and his dogs. Bo finds Mary and Joseph and gets them back to the stable, while Dave runs into the camels and helps them escape their bonds. Ruth finds her flock, who had previously refused to follow her, and tries to convince them to help, but gets unexpected help from the angel who informs them and their shepherds that the Savior is coming. Bo manages to fight off Thaddeus and Rufus, but is outdone by the hunter. Suddenly, Ruth and her flock, the camels, and Dave arrive and dispatch them by having them hang from a cliff. The hunter lets his dogs fall, but they are saved by Bo while the hunter himself falls to his death.

All of the animals, who are now joined by Abby who assumed the danger to be ongoing, and the redeemed Thaddeus & Rufus, shepherds, and three wise men arrive to see baby Jesus. Bo realizes that he has been carrying the new King the whole time. Deborah predicts that this event will be remembered around the world for years to come, which Cyrus and Felix both declare that she is crazy. After that, Joseph buys Bo from the miller, and Bo, Dave, and Ruth help him and Mary raise Jesus.

== Voice cast ==
- Steven Yeun as Boaz "Bo" – A young mill donkey who is loyal yet worrisome. He sees the star one night thinking it is a sign that his life is soon to change. When he hears of the Royal Caravan marching into Nazareth, he feels this is his purpose and escapes to try to join it. But when he encounters Mary, he feels more dedicated to be with her and keep her out of danger.
- Zachary Levi as Joseph – A usually-pessimistic and paranoid young Hebrew carpenter whom Mary weds, soon to be the personal legal guardian of Jesus.
- Gina Rodriguez as Mary – A loving and caring young Hebrew woman and soon to be the Mother of Jesus, the Son of God.
- Keegan-Michael Key as Dave – A smug and eccentric dove who is Bo's best friend. He joins Bo on his quest to join the Royal Caravan but is more set on that than he is at helping others.
- Aidy Bryant as Ruth – A light-hearted, bubbly, and naïve sheep who left her flock to follow the star. She later joins Bo and Dave on their journey to Bethlehem with Mary and Joseph. At first, she seems to be a nuisance to them, but Bo later grows a soft spot for her and soon becomes friends with her.
- Ving Rhames as Thaddeus – A sinister captive purebred wolf who is determined to find Jesus for his master.
- Gabriel Iglesias as Rufus – An alaunt who is a dimwitted sidekick to Thaddeus.
- Christopher Plummer as King Herod – The selfish, treacherous, greedy, and sinister king of Judea who hears about the new King who is arriving and sends the three wise men out to find him in Bethlehem while secretly sending his hunter to find and kill Mary.
- Tyler Perry as Cyrus – The intelligent and calm but skeptical leader of the three camels.
- Tracy Morgan as Felix – The youngest of the three camels. He is shown to be rather goofy and loudmouthed, and often gets into arguments with Cyrus.
- Oprah Winfrey as Deborah – The only female of the three camels. She is the most down-to-earth of the trio, but the other two often think she is crazy despite her attempts at being the voice of reason and keeping her cohorts from making bad choices.
- Lex Lang as The Hunter – A large, sinister, yet silent hunter whom King Herod sends out to kill the new King.
- Patricia Heaton as Edith – A cow who lives at the stable where Mary and Joseph eventually end up. She is the most level-headed of the animals who reside at the stable and is mostly unamused and pessimistic.
- Kelly Clarkson as Leah – A horse who lives at the stable where Mary and Joseph eventually end up. She loves to sing, but more often than not, her singing is obnoxiously loud, which is most likely caused by her lack of sleep since the star began to shine over the stable.
- Anthony Anderson as Zach – A goat who lives at the stable where Mary and Joseph eventually end up. He has deformed eyes and is very hyper and paranoid due to the lack of sleep he got since the star began to shine over the stable.
- Kristin Chenoweth as Abby – A pygmy jerboa who first witnesses the Angel coming to Mary. She tells her friends about it and tries to warn the others about the hunter.
- Mariah Carey as Rebecca – A chicken at a coop.
- Kris Kristofferson as The Old Donkey – Bo's fellow elderly mill donkey.
- Phil Morris as The Miller – Bo's former owner who is determined to get him back after he escaped from his mill.
- Joel McCrary as The Angel – The Holy Spirit who tells Mary that she will soon be carrying the Son of God.
  - McCrary also voices Zachariah, Elizabeth's husband and John's father.
- Joel Osteen as Caspar – One of the three wise men wearing red and Deborah's owner.
- Phil Morris as Balthazar – One of the three wise men wearing purple and Cyrus' owner.
- Fred Tatasciore as Melchior – One of the three wise men wearing blue and Felix's owner.
  - Tatasciore also voices a pottery vendor and an innkeeper.
- Delilah as Elizabeth – Zachariah's wife and John's mother.
- Roger Craig Smith as The Chamberlain
- Joe Whyte as A Scribe
- Will Townsend as A Horse and a Goat.
- Gregg Berger, Roger Craig Smith, Melissa Sturm and Joe Whyte as The Innkeepers.

== Production ==
The film's script was originally developed during the late 1990s by the Jim Henson Company, partially inspired by the success of the 1995 film Babe.

In September 2014, it was reported that DeVon Franklin would produce a faith-based film inspired by the Nativity story under his production company, Franklin Entertainment, in collaboration with Sony Pictures Animation. In April 2015, Variety reported that Timothy Reckart would direct the film in his directing debut. On August 5, 2015, it was announced that the film, then titled The Lamb, was given an official release date of December 8, 2017. On June 20, 2016, it was announced that Brian Henson and Lisa Henson from The Jim Henson Company would be executive producers for the film, now titled The Star, making it the first Henson-produced film for Sony since The Adventures of Elmo in Grouchland in 1999.

In an interview with Animation Magazine, Reckart expressed that he felt encouraged to direct the film, as he felt that there was a lack of Christmas films centering on the Nativity of Jesus: "It felt like an opportunity to be part of a movie that has not been done before, that's really going to fill a void."

The animation was produced by Cinesite Studios. Animation work began in January 2017.

=== Casting ===
On January 5, 2017, it was reported that Oprah Winfrey and Tyler Perry would be in the film. The rest of the cast was announced on January 19, 2017.

=== Soundtrack ===
The Star (Original Motion Picture Soundtrack) was released on October 27, 2017, including contributions from Jessie James Decker, Jake Owen, Kelsea Ballerini, Zara Larsson, Casting Crowns, Kirk Franklin, Fifth Harmony, Yolanda Adams, Saving Forever and Mariah Carey. Pentatonix also contributes a bonus track to the digital release of the album. The main single The Star, interpreted by Mariah Carey ranked at No. 6 on the Billboard US Holiday Digital Song Sales in 2017. The song was nominated for the Best Original Song at the 75th Golden Globe Awards.

The Star: Original Motion Picture Soundtrack
No.	Title	Artist	Length
1.	"The Star"	Mariah Carey	4:01
2.	"Children Go Where I Send You"	Kelsea Ballerini	2:40
3.	"We Three Kings"	Kirk Franklin	4:06
4.	"Can You See"	Fifth Harmony	3:57
5.	"Life Is Good"	A Great Big World	3:16
6.	"Mary, Did You Know?"	Zara Larsson	3:23
7.	"O Holy Night"	Yolanda Adams	4:20
8.	"What Christmas Means to Me"	Saving Forever	3:03
9.	"Breath of Heaven (Mary’s Song)"	Jessie James Decker	4:51
10.	"His Eye Is on the Sparrow"	Casting Crowns	4:19
11.	"What Child Is This?"	Jake Owen	3:16
12.	"Carol of the Bells"	Pentatonix	3:13
Total length:			44:17

== Release ==
In July 2016, the release date was set for November 10, 2017, but it was later pushed back to November 17, 2017. The Star had its world premiere in Los Angeles at the Regency Village Theater on November 12, 2017.

=== Marketing ===
The first trailer was released on July 26, 2017. On November 16, 2017, the official video for the song The Star, performed by Mariah Carey, was made available on her YouTube channel.

=== Home media ===
The Star was released on digital on February 6, 2018, and on DVD and Blu-ray on February 20, 2018, by Sony Pictures Home Entertainment.

== Reception ==
=== Box office ===
The Star has grossed $40.9 million in the United States and Canada, and $22.7 million in other territories, for a worldwide total of $63.6 million, against a production budget of $20 million.

In the United States and Canada, The Star was released alongside Justice League, Wonder and Roman J. Israel, Esq. and was projected to gross around $10 million from 2,800 theaters in its opening weekend. The film made $2.8 million on its first day. It ended up grossing $9.8 million in its opening weekend, finishing 6th at the box office.

=== Critical response ===
On review aggregation website Rotten Tomatoes, the film has an average rating by critics of 46% based on 50 reviews, with an average rating of 5.0/10. The site's critical consensus reads, "The Star may not leave audiences singing 'Hallelujah', but its offbeat yet sincere approach to the nativity story makes for acceptably diverting holiday viewing." On Metacritic, which assigns a normalized rating to reviews, the film has a weighted average score of 42 out of 100, based on 12 critics, indicating "mixed or average reviews". Audiences polled by CinemaScore gave the film an average grade of "A" on an A+ to F scale.

The A.V. Club's Ignatiy Vishnevetsky criticized The Star as a "rote cartoon feature" existing for purely commercial reasons: "...even the kid-friendliest, Sunday-school-iest kind of religious art can't spring from religion alone; it needs artistry, too. Otherwise, you end up with a generic product aimed at a market segment who'll buy anything as long as it seems sufficiently churchy."

=== Accolades ===
Award	Category	Recipients	Result
Golden Globe Awards	Best Original Song	"The Star"	Nominated
Annie Awards	Best Storyboarding in an Animated Feature Production	Louie del Carmen	Nominated
Annie Awards	Best Editorial in an Animated Feature Production	Pamela Ziegenhagen	Nominated
Heartland Film Festival 2017	Truly Moving Picture Award	Timothy Reckart	Won
Guild of Music Supervisors Awards	Best Music Supervision for Film: Budgeted Under 25 Million Dollars	Spring Aspers and Ron Fair	Nominated
MovieGuide Awards	Epiphany Prize for Inspiring Movies	"The Star"	Won

== See also ==
- List of Christmas films
- Christmas in the media
- The Night the Animals Talked
