= The Sound of Your Heart =

Sound of Your Heart may refer to:

- The Sound of Your Heart (webcomic)
- The Sound of Your Heart (TV series)
- "Sound of Your Heart", by Shawn Hook
- "The Sound of Your Heart", by Eskimo Joe, Steve Parkin from Inshalla
- "The Sound of Your Heart", by Four Year Strong from Four Year Strong
