= Alexander Jean =

American rock duo

- Origin: Los Angeles, California, U.S.
- Genres: Rock
- Years active: 2015–present
- Members: Mark Ballas; BC Jean
- Website: www.alexanderjeanofficial.com

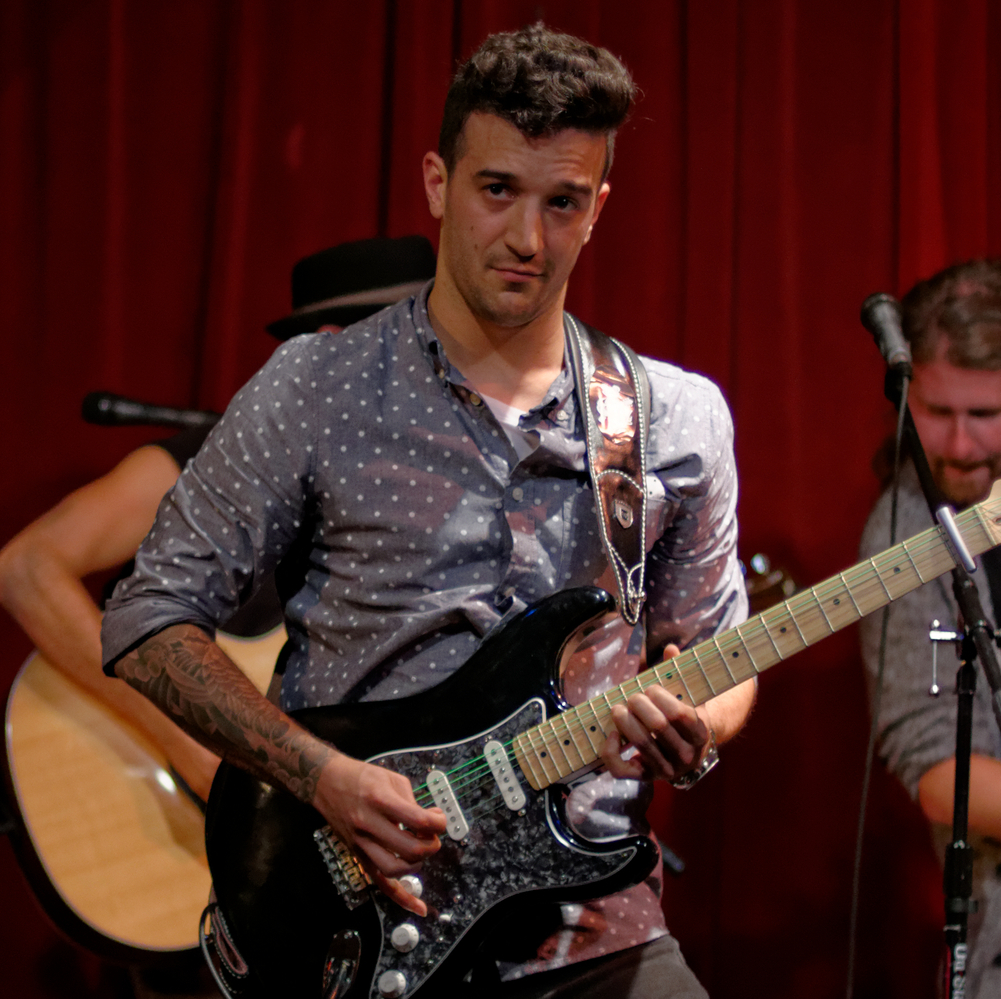
Mark Ballas performing in 2014

Alexander Jean is an American music duo made up of singers Mark Ballas and BC Jean. The name for the duo is a combination of their two middle names. Ballas and Jean first met in 2012. Ballas was performing in a band while Jean was performing her own material. They became an official music duo in 2015. They also married each other in November 2016.

Their debut single was "Roses and Violets". It reached the top 20 on Billboard's Bubbling Under Hot 100 chart. Alexander Jean were picked in November 2018 as Elvis Duran's Artist of the Month. The duo was featured on NBC's Today show, hosted by Hoda Kotb and Kathie Lee Gifford, broadcast nationally in the United States where they performed a live version of their single "Waiting for You".

== Members ==
=== Mark Ballas ===
Mark Alexander Ballas Jr. (born May 24, 1986) is a British/American singer-songwriter, musician, critically acclaimed professional dancer, choreographer and actor. He played Charlie Price in the 2012 Broadway musical Kinky Boots and played Frankie Valli in the Broadway musical Jersey Boys.

=== BC Jean ===
Brittany Jean Carlson (born April 22, 1987), better known by her stage name BC Jean, is an American singer-songwriter and actress, perhaps best known for writing the song "If I Were a Boy" which was later sung by Beyoncé and achieved worldwide commercial success.

== Discography ==
=== EPs ===
- 2016: Head High
- 2017: High Enough
- 2021: Coming Down

=== Singles ===
- 2016: "Roses and Violets"
- 2016: "So Bad"
- 2017: "Paper Planes"
- 2017: "We Three Kings" (feat. Casey Abrams)
- 2018: "Stampede" (feat. Lindsey Stirling)
- 2018: "Waiting for You"
- 2019: "O Holy Night"
- 2020: "For Anybody Wondering"
- 2020: "Nevermind"
- 2020: "Highs & Lows"
- 2020: "God Rest You Merry, Gentlemen"
- 2021: "Another One Bites the Dust" (original performed by Queen)
