= Shawn Hook =

Canadian singer, songwriter, producer

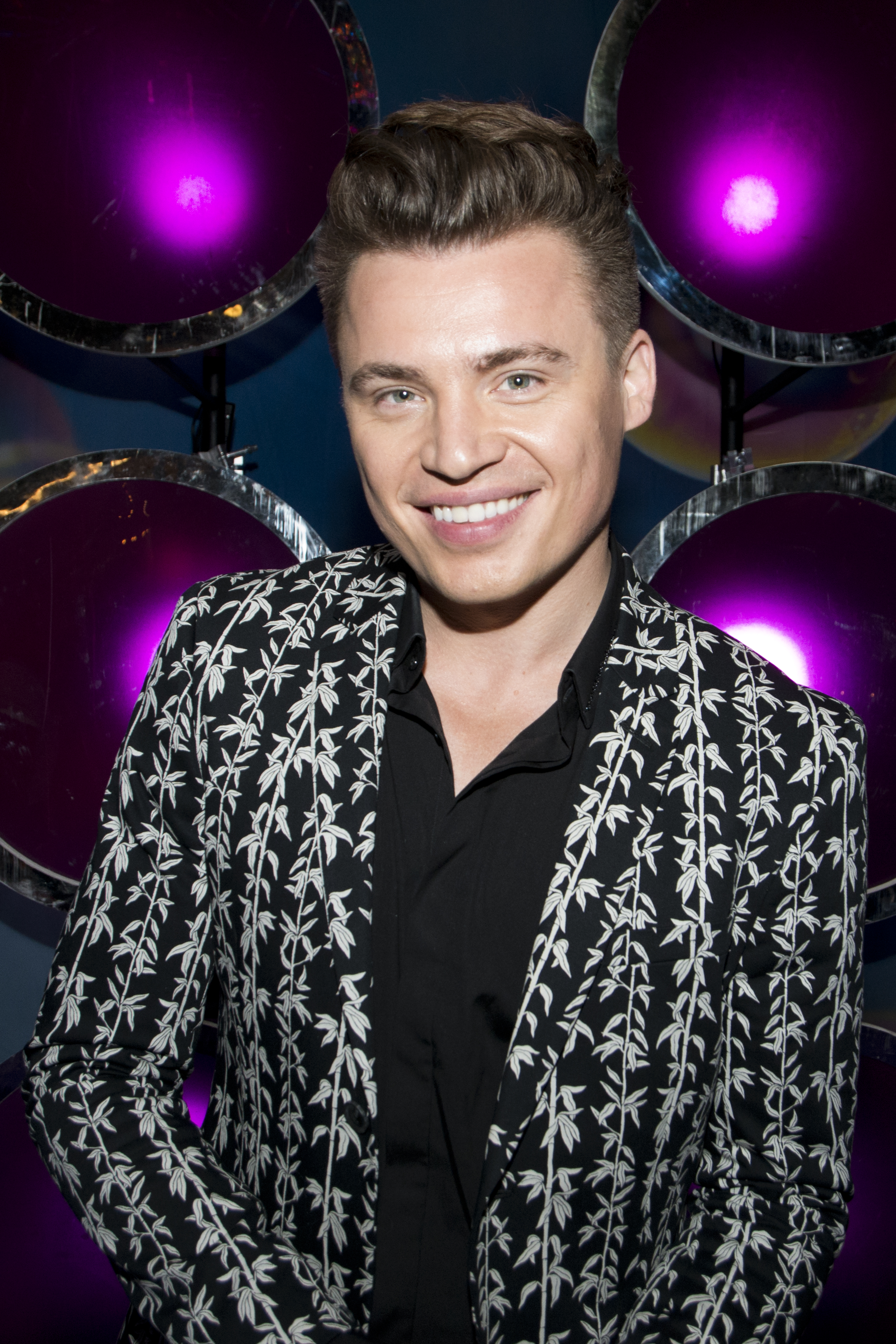
- Hook in 2016

Background information
- Born: Shawn Hlookoff; 5 September 1984 (age 42); Castlegar, British Columbia, Canada
- Origin: Castlegar, British Columbia, Canada
- Genres: Pop; electronic; rock
- Occupations: Singer; songwriter; producer
- Instruments: Vocals, piano
- Years active: 2004–present
- Labels: Hollywood; Creative Soul Entertainment; EMI Canada; Universal Canada
- Website: shawnhook.com

Shawn Hlookoff (born 5 September 1984), known as Shawn Hook, is a Canadian singer, songwriter, producer and cancer survivor.

== Career ==
Hook studied piano through the Royal Conservatory from as early as age 4. In high school, he played piano and trombone in a jazz combo and jazz big band under the guidance of Rick Lingard. Shawn enrolled in a music composition course at Mount Sentinel Secondary School and started writing and recording his own music.

His first release using his real name Shawn Hlookoff was in 2004 after Colin Davison (a.k.a. Jude Davison, his vocal teacher at Selkirk College Music School) offered to produce it. He also gigged with the disco cover band Shag as a trombone player and back-up vocalist. Enrolling at The Art Institute of Vancouver, he studied audio engineering. He released a second independent 11-track album in 2006 titled Both Sides, also credited as Shawn Hlookoff.

He was the first artist/songwriter to sign to ABC Studios in Los Angeles in 2008. During that time, he made a live appearance on Good Morning America. His compositions were featured on several ABC TV shows including "Life in Faith" on Eli Stone, "She Could Be You" on Kyle XY and "Be Myself" in Greek. His song "Without You" premiered on MTV's series The Hills. His music was also featured in other series like Samurai Girl, General Hospital etc. During his time in Los Angeles, he landed his first acting role as a guest star on the Fox TV show Bones.

Adopting the artistic name Shawn Hook, he released his official debut album Cosmonaut and the Girl produced by Jon Levine on EMI with "So Close", "Every Red Light" and "Two Hearts Set on Fire" as singles from the album. He released a holiday song called "Follow the Lights" in 2012. In 2013, he collaborated with DJ Poet Name Life and Chebacca on a song called "Laser Ray", released on Listen Deep Records. It was his 2014 hit single "Million Ways", released on 2 September 2014, that helped him gain popularity and a following. It became his then most successful charting single on Billboard Canadian Hot 100, giving him three simultaneous hits on the Canadian Hot 100. His highest charting single is "Sound of Your Heart", which has peaked at No. 23 as of 6 June 2015. "Sound of Your Heart" was featured in promotional commercials for Season 20 of The Bachelor.

On 21 December 2015, it was announced that Hook had signed a deal with major US label Hollywood Records. Hollywood and ABC share the same Parent company, bringing Hook's US Songwriting and Recording contracts together under one deal. In the fall of 2016, Hook joined Lindsey Stirling on her North American tour. In February 2016, he was picked as Elvis Duran's Artist of the Month and was featured on NBC's Today show hosted by Kathy Lee Gifford and Hoda Kotb and broadcast nationally where he performed live his single "Sound of Your Heart". Later in 2016, he opened for Marianas Trench on their North American tour.

In April 2017, Hook released the single "Reminding Me" featuring Vanessa Hudgens. The two star in the music video, which was also released that month. They performed the duet on the season 14 finale of So You Think You Can Dance.

Hook is signed to Kreative Soul Entertainment, Inc. under exclusive license to EMI Music Canada. He has a worldwide deal with Hollywood Records for releases outside of Canada.

== Personal life ==
Shawn was raised in the Slocan Valley of British Columbia, Canada, by his parents. He attended Mount Sentinel Secondary School in South Slocan, where he was an active participant in athletics—particularly volleyball—and was also heavily involved in the school's music program.

He established the charity "Feed The Need" with longtime friend Kara Martin, and collected donations for various charities as well as performing at various regional high schools to raise food for the local food bank. Today, he continues with the charity registered and it's been rebranded as "Live To Give".

In February 2023, aged 38, he announced he was diagnosed with tonsil cancer. However, after undergoing surgery and chemotherapy, he eventually recovered and returned to music.

== Discography ==
=== Albums ===
Title	Album details	Notes
Both Sides	Release date: 28 November 2006; Record label: Independent; Note: Released as Shawn Hlookoff	No. / Title / Length; 1. / "Addicted" / 3:47; 2. / "Jealousy Is Killing Me" / 3:43; 3. / "Life Goes On" / 3:52; 4. / "Doesn't Get Much Better Than This" / 3:29; 5. / "What You Did" / 3:33; 6. / "Fool" / 3:11; 7. / "Soldier" / 4:23; 8. / "Get It Right" / 4:18; 9. / "My Neighbourhood" / 4:05; 10. / "Both Sides" / 3:53
Cosmonaut and the Girl	Release date: 8 May 2012; Record label: Kreative Soul/EMI Canada	No. / Title / Length; 1. / "Planet Earth" / 4:01; 2. / "Every Red Light" / 3:42; 3. / "Dirty Little War" / 3:52; 4. / "Two Hearts Set on Fire" / 3:29; 5. / "Rockstaria" / 3:26; 6. / "Shadows" / 3:30; 7. / "So Close" / 3:26; 8. / "Middle Finger" / 3:00; 9. / "Fool" / 3:23; 10. / "One Life" / 3:44; 11. / "Every Red Light (Acoustic Version)" / 3:50; 12. / "Rainbow" / 3:28; 13. / "Every Red Light (Radio Version)" (Video bonus) / 3:53
Analog Love	Release date: 9 June 2015; Record label: Kreative Soul	No. / Title / Length; 1. / "In Over My Head" / 4:10; 2. / "Analog Love" / 4:01; 3. / "Sound of Your Heart" / 3:22; 4. / "Million Ways" / 3:30; 5. / "Bad Girls" / 3:15; 6. / "Relapse" / 3:53; 7. / "Who Do You Love" / 3:45; 8. / "In Over My Head (Piano Version)" / 4:32; 9. / "Million Ways (HiClass Weapon Remix)" / 3:51

=== EPs ===
Title	EP details	Peak positions	Notes
Title	EP details	CAN	Notes
My Side of Your Story	Release date: 16 June 2017; Record label: Universal, Hollywood	74	No. / Title / Length; 1. / "Good Days" / 3:34; 2. / "Reminding Me" (featuring Vanessa Hudgens) / 3:29; 3. / "Never Let Me Let You Go" / 3:45; 4. / "Dancing in the Sky" / 3:39
Take Me Home	Release date: 23 October 2020; Record label: Ultra	—	No. / Title / Length; 1. / "I Don't Wanna Dance" / 3:26; 2. / "Good Love" / 3:20; 3. / "Deeper" / 2:47; 4. / "Holding on to You" / 3:06; 5. / "Stay with You" / 2:28; 6. / "Take Me Home" / 2:51; 7. / "Instant Crush" / 4:57
Beauty in Surrender	Release date: 28 June 2024; Record label: Infinity Records	—	No. / Title / Length; 1. / "Winter Jacket" / 2:49; 2. / "Magic" / 2:54; 3. / "Bigger Than the Night" / 2:58; 4. / "Rocks" / 3:26; 5. / "City Where It Rains" / 3:02; 6. / "Pick You Up" / 5:02
"—" denotes a recording which failed to chart or was not released to that format.

=== Singles ===
Year	Single	Peak chart positions						Certifications	Album
Year	Single	CAN	CAN AC	CAN CHR	CAN HAC	US Bub.	US Pop	Certifications	Album
2008	"Without You" (Note: "Without You" was released under the name Shawn Hlookoff.)	—	—	—	—	—	—		Non-album singles
2012	"Follow the Lights"	—	47	—	—	—	—		Non-album singles
2012	"So Close"	68	10	—	10	—	—		Cosmonaut and the Girl
2012	"Every Red Light"	65	—	35	18	—	—		Cosmonaut and the Girl
2013	"Two Hearts Set on Fire"	—	22	—	34	—	—		Cosmonaut and the Girl
2014	"Million Ways"	44	8	13	8	—	—		Analog Love
2015	"Sound of Your Heart"	23	12	8	8	5	24	MC: 2× Platinum	Analog Love
2016	"Relapse"	88	22	20	11	—	—		Analog Love
2017	"Reminding Me" (featuring Vanessa Hudgens)	30	7	8	4	—	—	MC: 2× Platinum	My Side of Your Story
2017	"Never Let Me Let You Go"	—	47	15	23	—	—		My Side of Your Story
2020	"I Don't Wanna Dance"	—	44	25	32	—	—		Take Me Home
2020	"Instant Crush"	—	—	—	—	—	—		Take Me Home
2020	"Holding on to You"	—	—	48	—	—	—		Take Me Home
2020	"Deeper"	—	—	—	—	—	—		Take Me Home
2020	"Take Me Home"	—	26	35	34	—	—		Take Me Home
2021	"Used to You" (with Serena Ryder)	—	—	—	—	—	—		Non-album singles
2022	"It All Comes Back to You" (featuring Emily Roberts)	—	—	—	—	—	—		Non-album singles
2023	"Out of My Head" (with the Banker Boys)	—	—	—	—	—	—		Non-album singles
2024	"Bigger Than the Night"	—	—	—	—	—	—		Beauty in Surrender
2024	"Magic"	—	—	—	—	—	—		Beauty in Surrender
2024	"Crazy Love" (with Svnsets)	—	—	—	—	—	—		Non-album singles
2025	"Lie"	—	—	—	—	—	—		Non-album singles
2025	"Miss Me Too"	—	—	—	—	—	—		Non-album singles
"—" denotes a recording which failed to chart or was not released to that format.

=== Featured singles ===
Year	Single	Peak chart positions	Album
Year	Single	CAN	Album
2020	"Lean on Me" (as part of ArtistsCAN)	13	Non-album singles
2023	"Last Christmas" (Virginia to Vegas featuring Tyler Shaw, Lolo, New Friends, Noelle, Shawn Hook)	—	Non-album singles
"—" denotes a recording which failed to chart or was not released to that format.

=== Soundtrack contributions ===
==== as Shawn Hlookoff ====
- 2008: Kyle XY – "She Could Be You"
- 2008: Eli Stone – "Life in Faith"
- 2009: The Hills – "Without You"
- 2009: Greek – "Be Myself"
- 2009: Bitter/Sweet – "Straight to You"
- 2009: The Suite Life on Deck – "Wonderful Surprise"

== Awards and nominations ==
Year	Ceremony	Award	Nominated work	Result	Ref.
2013	Juno Awards	Breakthrough Artist of the Year	Himself	Nominated	
2016	Juno Awards	Fan Choice Award	Himself	Nominated	
2017	Canada's Walk of Fame	Allan Slaight Honour	Himself	Recipient	
2024	Berlin Music Video Awards	Best Animation	Bigger than the Night	Nominated	
