= AudioDamn! =

German pop rock trio

- Origin: Mannheim, Germany
- Genres: Pop rock, soul
- Years active: 2011–present
- Label: Epic
- Members: Oliver "Oli" Wimmer; Ali Grumeth; Daniel "Mudi" Mudrack

AudioDamn! is a pop rock trio from Germany. The band made up of Austrians Oliver "Oli" Wimmer (vocals/guitar) and Ali Grumeth (guitar/bass/vocals) and German Daniel "Mudi" Mudrack was formed in 2011 in Mannheim, Germany. They released their self-titled debut EP AudioDamn! EP on January 8, 2016 featuring the singles "Radar" and "Lights Out". The band has been signed to Epic Records since 2015.

The Austrian duo Wimmer and Grumeth had started their career in Austria with their own musical project Amsterdamn! before moving to Germany where they enrolled in Popakademie Baden-Württemberg where they met Mudrack.

In November 2015, the band was picked as Elvis Duran's Artist of the Month and was featured on NBC's Today show broadcast nationally in the United States where they performed live their single "Radar".

== Discography ==
=== EPs ===
- 2016: AudioDamn! EP

=== Singles ===
- 2015: "Radar"
- 2015: "Lights Out"
- 2016: "Don't Call Me When It's Over"
