= Nikki Williams =

South African singer-songwriter (born 1988)

- Born: 9 November 1988 (age 37); Port Elizabeth, South Africa
- Genres: Pop; dance
- Occupation: Singer-songwriter
- Instrument: Vocals
- Labels: Chameleon Entertainment/Island Def Jam; Big Yellow Dog/Atlantic Records (current)

Nikki Williams (born 9 November 1988) is a South African singer-songwriter.

== Early life ==
Williams was born and raised in Port Elizabeth, South Africa. She has two older sisters who live in South Africa and a younger sister, Jade Williams, who moved to the USA with her and her mother, Mandy Morgan (née Williams) when she was 16 years old. They lived in Los Angeles for seven months and then moved to Nashville, Tennessee. Several years later, Nikki moved back to Los Angeles where she met Breyon Prescott and signed with his label Chameleon Entertainment/Island Def Jam.

== Career ==
Her songwriting credits include Lauren Alaina's "Like My Mother Does", Demi Lovato's platinum selling "Heart Attack", Laura Pausini's "Le Due Finestre" (the latest single off Laura's Latin Grammy nominated album Fatti Sentire album). She has also co-written "Fly Again" from the Country Strong soundtrack, Nash Overstreet's "You Don't Get 2 Do That," "Brand New Man" and "Magnetic," L2M's "Girlz," and Ronnie Milsap's "Make Up (Feat. Mandy Barnett)."

Her debut single "Kill, Fuck, Marry", which was produced by Stargate and co-written by Sia, was released on 19 November 2012.

Her second single "Glowing" was released on 4 December 2012. The song was written by Williams, Arnthor Birgisson, Daniel James, Leah Haywood, Bebe Rexha and Sandy Vee, and produced by Vee. It debuted at No. 48 on the Billboard Hot Dance Club Songs chart later reaching No. 3 It also reached No. 21 on the Billboard Pop Songs chart, and No. 1 on the Billboard Bubbling Under Hot 100 chart.

In May 2013, she was picked as Elvis Duran's Artist of the Month and was featured on the American television network NBC's Today show hosted by Kathie Lee Gifford and Hoda Kotb, where she performed live her song "Glowing".

Her third single "Thank God It's Friday" was released on 15 November 2013 along with the lyric video which was posted on her YouTube Vevo channel that same day.

Williams is currently signed to Big Yellow Dog Publishing and Atlantic Records. On 16 November 2018, she released her first single in five years, titled "Trouble" with DJ and producer Parov Stelar.

== Personal life ==
She married Nicolas Cage's son, Weston on 24 April 2011 in New Orleans. Cage filed for divorce in October 2011, which was finalised in June 2012.

== Discography ==
- "Kill, Fuck, Marry" (2012)
- "Glowing" (2012)
- "Thank God It's Friday" (2013)
- "Trouble" (2018)
- “You Don’t Own Me” (2021)
