= Popakademie Baden-Württemberg =

German conservatory for popular music

Coordinates: 49.4964°N 8.4572°E

- University of Popular Music And Music Business
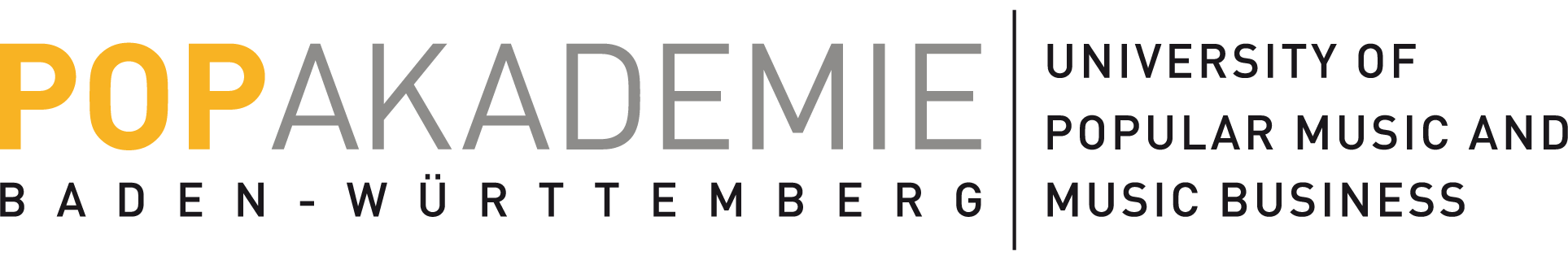
- Type: Public
- Established: 2003
- Rector: Derek von Krogh & Michael Herberger
- Students: 377 (2018)
- Location: Mannheim, Baden-Württemberg, Germany
- Website: www.popakademie.de

The Popakademie Baden-Württemberg (University of Popular Music And Music Business) is a German public conservatory for popular music based in Mannheim, Germany. Established in 2003 by the state of Baden-Württemberg, it was the first institution of higher education in Germany to offer academic degree programs focusing on popular music and music business. It offers three bachelor and two master degree programs. Furthermore, the Popakademie is a centre of competence for all aspects of the music industry with numerous projects in the areas of international cooperation and regional development.

== Academic profile ==
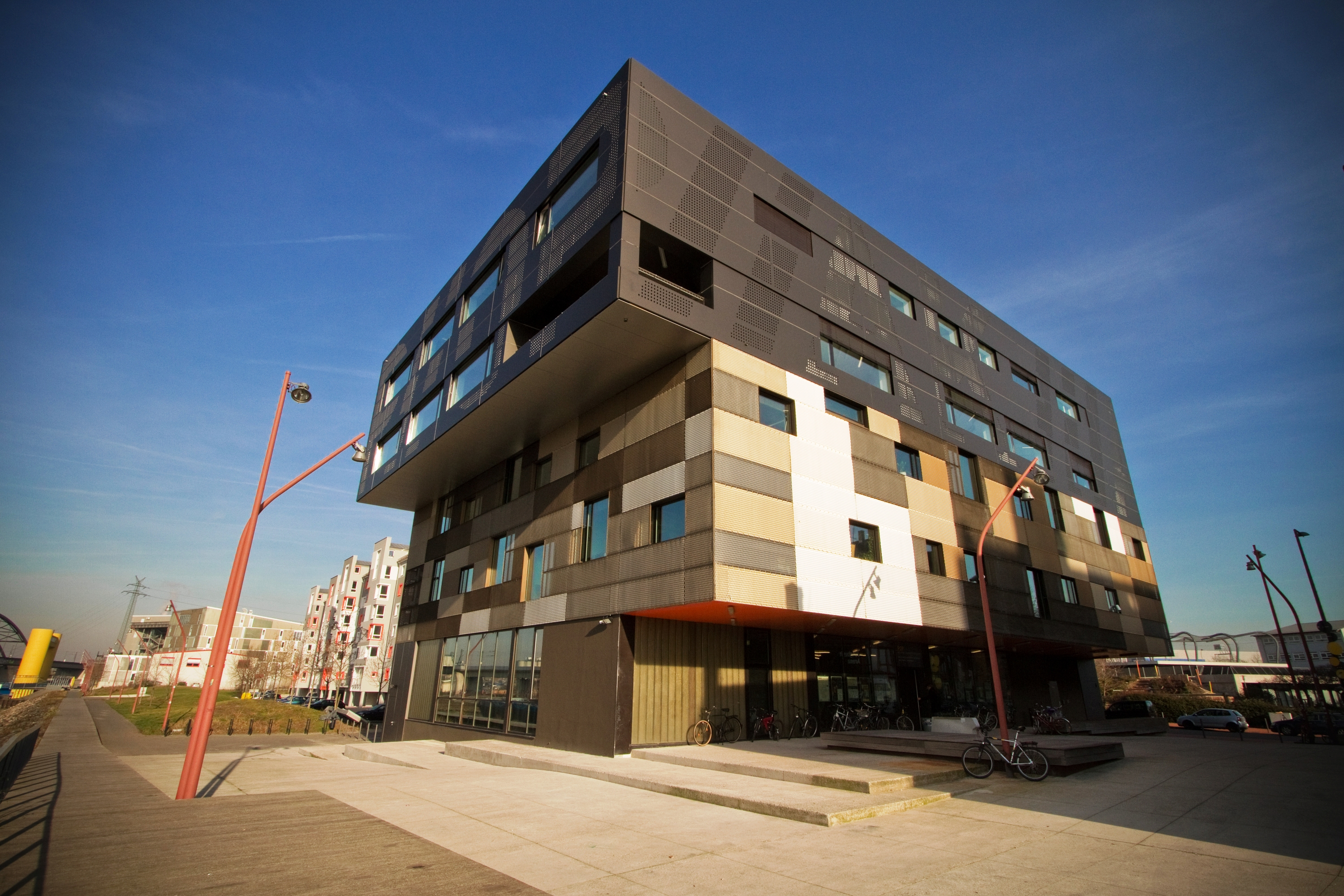
Popakademie main building in Mannheim

The Popakademie Baden-Württemberg is divided into an artistic and a business sector. Each sector contains one accredited bachelor and one accredited master's degree program. In February 2015, the Popakademie established a new bachelor's degree program in World Music.

Conditions of application are equivalent of A-levels or international baccalaureate. Additionally, practical experience is required. To apply for the master's degree program, a bachelor's degree is required. Admission for the programs is only during the winter term. Studying at the Popakademie is free of charge.

Popular Music Department

Director: Derek von Krogh

- Pop Music Design (Bachelor of Arts)
- Global Music (Bachelor of Arts)
- Popular Music (Master of Arts)

Music and Creative Industries Department

Director: Michael Herberger

- Music Business (Bachelor of Arts)
- Music and Creative Industries (Master of Arts)

Among the 150 lecturers of the Popakademie, there are outstanding artists and experts of the music business. Business and music students as well as graduates of the Popakademie took part in successful collaborations, such as the German number-one-albums of Casper, Cro, Frida Gold and Tim Bendzko. Popakademie-related bands and artists like Abby, Crada, The Intersphere, Virtual Riot, Get Well Soon, Jewelz & Sparks and AudioDamn! played international shows and festivals such as Glastonbury and SXSW. Graduates of the Popakademie work as musicians, composing artists, songwriters and producers or as artist managers, label owners, publishers and (executive) staff members in all relevant functions of music business companies.

== International ==
The Popakademie is part of a worldwide network. It has partnerships and cooperates with many international conservatories and institutions. As a member of the Association Européenne des Conservatoires, Académies de Musique et Musikhochschulen (AEC), it promotes intercultural exchange of students and lecturers. The Popakademie has an Erasmus University Charta. Regularly, projects and events such as the European Band- & Businesscamp, the International Songwriter Week and the International Summer Camp take place at the Popakademie in Mannheim.

Partner network (selection):

- Ballyfermot College Of Further Education (Dublin/Ireland)
- Dublin Institute of Technology, BIMM (Dublin/Ireland)
- Linnaeus University / Rock City Hultsfred (Hultsfred/Sweden)
- University of Westminster - Department of Commercial Music (London/England)
- Conservatorio Luisa D'Annunzio (Pescara/Italy)
- Escola Superior de la Musica de Catalunya (Barcelona/Spain)
- Hochschule der Künste Bern (Bern/Switzerland)
- Herman Brood Academie, Utrecht/Netherlands)
- Fontys Rockacademie Tilburg (Tilburg/ Netherlands)
- PXL-Music (Hasselt/Belgium)
- University of Agder (Kristiansand/Norway)
- Columbia College (Chicago/United States)
- Middle Tennessee State University (United States)
- Pop Music Academy of Sichuan, Conservatory of Music (Chengdu/China)
- European Music Office (Belgium)
- European Association of Conservatories (AEC) Working group Pop and Jazz Platform (Belgium)
- Music and Audio Institute of New Zealand (Auckland/New Zealand)
