= Elle Winter =

American singer-songwriter

- Born: Laura Brooke Winter; May 17, 1999 (age 26); New York City, U.S.
- Occupations: Singer, songwriter
- Instrument: Vocals
- Years active: 2018–present
- Label: Sony RED
- Website: www.ellewinter.com

Laura Brooke Winter (born May 17, 1999), known professionally as Elle Winter, is an American singer-songwriter and actress from New York City. After signing with Sony Orchard. In March 2020, she released her first EP Yeah, No.

== Early life ==
Winter was born May 17, 1999, in Manhattan, New York City. She has one older sister, Lizzie. Brought up on the Upper East Side of Manhattan, Winter attended The Trinity School and is currently enrolled at the University of Pennsylvania.

== Career ==
Winter was discovered by Disney at the age of 12, where she was part of Radio Disney's Next Big Thing season 5. She toured the United States on behalf of Radio Disney and released her first two singles with Walt Disney Records, "Day Away" and "Incredible". As a part of the program, her home life was featured on The Disney Channel in 2013.

Winter began acting with her appearance in 3 Generations in 2015, starring Elle Fanning and Susan Sarandon. Winter played Fanning's love interest. She has subsequently appeared in other films including Code Red (2016) and The After Party (2018).

In 2018, Winter independently released the single "One More” that resulted in a performance spot on The Today Show. In the same year, she was named Elvis Duran's Artist of the Month as well as KIIS FM LA's Next Up Artist. In the beginning of 2019, she signed with Sony's Red Music. She released her first EP in 2020, titled Yeah, No. and made a music video for the title track. The EP was made with production team The Orphanage. The EP includes the singles "Sick Of You" and "Do You", both of which had been released in 2019. On the day she released the EP, she also released the music video for its title track.
