= Secret Weapons of World War II =

Secret Weapons of World War II may refer to:

- Nazi Germany secret weapons
  - Röchling shell
  - Vergeltungswaffen
  - Wunderwaffen
- Battlefield 1942: Secret Weapons of WWII, a video game expansion
- Secret Weapons Over Normandy, 2003 video game
- Secret Weapons of the Luftwaffe, 1991 video game

== See also ==
- Secret Weapon (disambiguation)
