= Reminding Me =

Single by Shawn Hook featuring Vanessa Hudgens

from the EP My Side of Your Story
- Released: April 21, 2017
- Genre: Pop
- Length: 3:30
- Label: Hollywood; Universal
- Songwriters: Shawn Hook; Jonas Jeberg; Ethan Thompson
- Producers: Jonas Jeberg; Stephen Kozmeniuk

Shawn Hook singles chronology
| "Relapse" (2016) | "Reminding Me" (2017) | "Never Let Me Let You Go" (2017) |

Vanessa Hudgens singles chronology
| "Right Here, Right Now" (2008) | "Reminding Me" (2017) | "Lay with Me" (2018) |

Music video
- "Reminding Me" on YouTube

"Reminding Me" is a song by Canadian singer-songwriter Shawn Hook featuring American actress and singer Vanessa Hudgens. Hook co-wrote the pop ballad with Jonas Jeberg and Ethan Thompson. It was released to digital retailers and streaming platforms on April 21, 2017, through Hollywood Records and Universal Music Canada as the lead single from Hook's EP My Side of Your Story. "Reminding Me" also impacted American contemporary hit radio on May 16, 2017.

== Commercial performance ==
"Reminding Me" debuted at number 92 on the Billboard Canadian Hot 100 chart dated May 20, 2017.

== Track listings ==
Digital download

1. "Reminding Me" (featuring Vanessa Hudgens) – 3:29

Remixes – EP

1. "Reminding Me" (featuring Vanessa Hudgens) [Shaun Frank Remix] – 3:01
2. "Reminding Me" (featuring Vanessa Hudgens) [Price & Takis Remix] – 4:00
3. "Reminding Me" (featuring Vanessa Hudgens) [DJ Mike D Remix] – 3:38

== Music video ==
An accompanying black and white music video directed by Aya Tanimura premiered April 21, 2017 in conjunction with the song's digital release. It shows the duet partners individually mourning a past relationship in a mansion, with Hook stationed primarily by the piano and Hudgens by an expansive window and then an indoor pool. Later, there are scenes of the two getting intimate in a bed. The video drew praise for Hudgens's "sex appeal" and glamorous look.

== Charts and certifications ==
=== Weekly charts ===
| Chart (2017) | Peak position |
|---|---|
| Canada Hot 100 (Billboard) | 30 |
| Canada AC (Billboard) | 7 |
| Canada CHR/Top 40 (Billboard) | 8 |
| Canada Hot AC (Billboard) | 4 |
| Czech Republic Airplay (ČNS IFPI) | 7 |
| Czech Republic Singles Digital (ČNS IFPI) | 60 |
| Poland Airplay (ZPAV) | 30 |
| Slovakia Airplay (ČNS IFPI) | 44 |
| Slovakia Singles Digital (ČNS IFPI) | 68 |
| Sweden Heatseeker (Sverigetopplistan) | 15 |
| US Adult Pop Airplay (Billboard) | 38 |

=== Year-end charts ===
| Chart (2017) | Position |
|---|---|
| Canada (Canadian Hot 100) | 86 |

=== Certifications ===
| Region | Certification | Certified units/sales |
|---|---|---|
| Canada (Music Canada) | 2× Platinum | 160,000^{‡} |
^{‡} Sales+streaming figures based on certification alone.

== Release history ==
| Country | Date | Format | Version | Label | Ref. |
|---|---|---|---|---|---|
| Various | April 21, 2017 | Digital download; streaming | Original | Hollywood; Universal | |
| United States | May 16, 2017 | Contemporary hit radio | Original | Hollywood; Universal | |
| Italy | July 14, 2017 | Contemporary hit radio | Original | Universal | |
| Various | July 28, 2017 | Digital download; streaming | Remixes EP | Hollywood; Universal | |
