= Secret Weapons (band) =

Secret Weapons is a Brooklyn-based American pop band made up of Gerry Lange and Danny Rocco. The duo is signed to the label Epic Records, where Rocco worked as a lawyer in the label's legal department. They released their self-titled EP Secret Weapons in 2016.

The duo is best known for their single "Something New" released in 2015. In November 2015, the duo was picked as Elvis Duran's Artist of the Month and was featured on NBC's Today show hosted by Kathie Lee Gifford and Hoda Kotb and broadcast nationally where they performed live their single "Something New". A music video was released on April 12, 2016, and was directed by Nathan Cox.

== Permanent hiatus (2018) ==
On January 30, 2018, Gerry Lange made a Facebook post announcing his deteriorating health condition and a hiatus for the band. It was later disclosed that Gerry had been diagnosed with Lyme Disease. Danny Rocco began work on his solo project later that year, releasing his first single in February 2018. As of September 2021, Gerry has collaborated with Des Rocs as a lyricist and producer, including the This is Our Life EP and MMC single.

== See also ==
- Des Rocs, the solo project by Danny Rocco
