= Peøria =

- Also known as: Saving Forever, Peoria
- Origin: South Chicago, Illinois, United States
- Genres: Pop rock, alternative
- Years active: 2017–present
- Labels: SFX 7 LLC, Epic
- Members: Kavah Harris; Kye Harris; Khaden Harris
- Website: www.savingforever.com

Peøria, previously known as Saving Forever, is a pop rock band originating from South Chicago, Illinois. Consisting of brothers Khaden (born 2004), Kye (born 2002) and Kavah Harris (born 2001), sibling band comes from a strong musical background that stems from their family. The trio released "Twenty 1", followed by the single "Million Ways" in 2017, which was accompanied by a music video. The band was picked as Elvis Duran's Artist of the Month, and was also broadcast nationally on NBC's Today show hosted by Kathie Lee Gifford and Hoda Kotb where they performed their single "Million Ways" live.

The band changed their name from Saving Forever to Peøria in June 2020. Their self-titled EP was released on August 7, 2020. The EP was produced by Kye Harris, Christopher Ahn and Laprete.
