= Glowing (song) =

2012 single by Nikki Williams

Single by Nikki Williams
- Released: 4 December 2012
- Label: Chameleon; Island Def Jam
- Songwriters: Nikki Williams; Arnthor Birgisson; Daniel James; Leah Haywood; Bebe Rexha; Sandy Vee

Music video
- "Glowing" on YouTube

"Glowing" is a song by singer-songwriter Nikki Williams, released on 4 December 2012. The song's lyrics deal with romantic desire for an unavailable man. Its composition heavily features synth and bass. The music video for the song was directed by Hype Williams.

== Music video ==
The video was directed by Hype Williams who collaborated with Nikki for both her and his aims for the video, and the video premiered on YouTube on March 25, 2013.

=== Synopsis ===
The video shows Nikki and three of her friends traveling around Miami at night in an RV and two convertible Chevrolet Impalas, and they sing along with people at a traveling carnival. Nikki sings to the camera the whole time and it shakes to the song. Eventually she performs on a stage at the same carnival and dives into the crowd, and they carry her away.

== Charts ==
Chart performance for "Glowing"
Chart (2013)	Peak position
Canada Hot 100 (Billboard)	76
Canada CHR/Top 40 (Billboard)	35
US Bubbling Under Hot 100 (Billboard)	1
US Dance Club Songs (Billboard)	3
US Dance/Mix Show Airplay (Billboard)	22
US Hot Dance/Electronic Songs (Billboard)	11
US Pop Airplay (Billboard)	21

== Release history ==
Release dates and formats for "Glowing"
Region	Date	Format	Label(s)	Ref.
United States	26 March 2013	Mainstream airplay	IDJMG	
