= Juice (American band) =

American rock band

- Origin: Boston, Massachusetts, United States
- Genres: Rock
- Years active: 2013–present
- Members: Ben Stevens; Christian Rose; Kamau Burton; Daniel Moss; Rami El-Abidin
- Past members: Chris Vu; Jack Godfrey; Michael Ricciardulli; Miles Clyatt
- Website: itstimeforjuice.com

Juice is an American rock band formed in Boston, Massachusetts in 2013. The band consists of Ben Stevens (lead vocals), Christian Rose (violin, vocals), Kamau Burton (acoustic guitar, vocals), Daniel Moss (guitar), and Rami El-Abidin (bass). Juice draws from many influences, including rock, pop, hip-hop, and R&B.

Juice formed at Boston College in 2013. The band with original bassist Jack Godfrey and original pianist Chris Vu, won BC's Battle of the Bands that same year. Godfrey, an exchange student at the time, was replaced by El-Abidin in 2014. While in college, Juice performed regularly in Boston and New York City.

In 2016, Juice released a self-titled EP after a successful crowd-funding campaign. In July of that year, Juice won the Land the Big Gig Competition at Summerfest in Milwaukee, WI. At the festival, the band was introduced to producer Johnny K, who invited the band to record an EP the following summer.

Juice released their professional debut EP, Workin' on Lovin', in June 2018.

== History ==
=== 2013–2015 ===
The members of Juice met at Boston College in 2013. The original lineup consisted of Burton, Rose, Moss, Ricciardulli, Vu, Godfrey, and Clyatt. Stevens was introduced to the band in early 2014, and the new eight-piece lineup went on to win BC's Battle of the Bands.

Godfrey, an exchange student, was replaced by El-Abidin later in 2014. Juice started booking shows in Boston and New York over the next two years.

=== 2016–present ===
In 2016, Juice recorded and released their self-titled debut EP. That summer, the band won the Land the Big Gig Competition at Summerfest in Milwaukee, Wisconsin. Producer Johnny K was one of the contest judges, and reached out to the band. In the summer of 2017, Juice and Johnny K went into the studio to record Juice's next EP, Workin' on Lovin'.

Juice released "Sugar", the first single off of Workin' on Lovin', in February 2017. "Heartbreak in a Box", the second single off of the EP, was released in May 2017. Workin' on Lovin' was released in June 2018. Juice embarked on a national tour to support the new release.

In August 2018, Juice was selected as Elvis Duran's Artist of the Month. The band performed their single "Sugar" on NBC's TODAY.

== Musical style ==
Juice blends several genres, including rock, pop, hip-hop, and R&B. Each member draws on a diverse array of influences. With three vocalists, Juice is known to incorporate elaborate harmonies. Juice also incorporates extended electric violin and guitar solos in their live performance.

== Band members ==
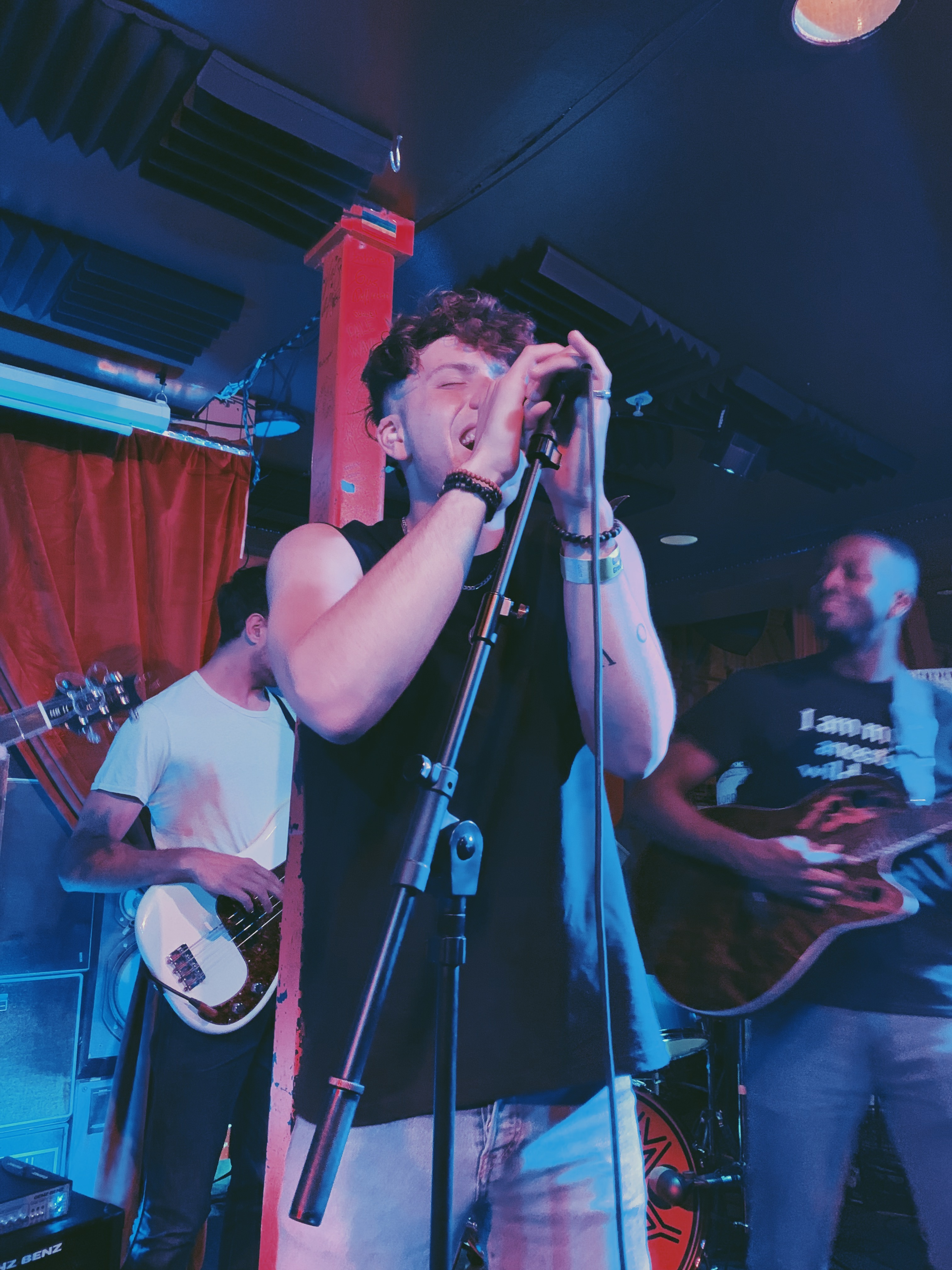
Ben Stevens performing with Juice at Songbyrd Music House in Washington, D.C.

=== Current members ===
- Ben Stevens - lead vocals (2014–present)
- Christian Rose (the stage name of Christian Rougeau) - violin, vocals (2013–present)
- Kamau Burton - acoustic guitar, vocals (2013–present)
- Daniel Moss - guitar (2013–present)
- Rami El-Abidin - bass guitar (2014–present)

=== Former members ===
- Chris Vu - piano and keyboards (2013-2017)
- Jack Godfrey - bass guitar (2013-2014)
- Michael Ricciardulli - guitar (2013–2022)
- Miles Clyatt - drums (2013-2024)
