= Liar Liar (Cris Cab song) =

Single by Cris Cab

from the album Where I Belong
- Released: September 30, 2013
- Recorded: 2013
- Genre: Pop rock, funk, reggae
- Length: 3:33
- Label: Island Def Jam
- Songwriters: Dallas Austin, Pharrell Williams, Cristian Cabrerizo
- Producers: Dallas Austin, Pharrell Williams

Cris Cab singles chronology
"Good Girls (Don't Grow on Trees)" (2012)	"Liar Liar" (2013)	"Loves Me Not" (2014)

Music video
- "Liar Liar" on YouTube

"Liar Liar" is the first internationally charting single by the American singer-songwriter Cris Cab, released on Island Def Jam Records.

It was written by Cab, Dallas Austin and Pharrell Williams and produced by Austin and Williams. Though Williams is featured in the song and the accompanying music video he is not officially credited on the cover of the single as a featured artist.

== Music video ==
A music video for the single was filmed by Aggressive, directed by Alex Topaller and Dan Shapiro and produced by Shapiro and Kelvin Carver. The video, shot in black and white, shows Cab strumming his guitar, or singing or in a relationship with some mysterious women. The video is an array of such women, an "arresting symmetry" in light and in shadow about some dangerous relationships with these attractive women showing off with their parallel mirrored images. Pharrell Williams makes a cameo appearance. Visuals and bits of intimate narrative are revealed and obscured by these reflections, teasing the viewer that there is tantalizing truth to be revealed. The video ends with one of the girls "capturing" Cab and tying him to a chair.

== Chart performance ==
The single first charted on the Dutch Top 40 in 2013 reaching number 9. It has since become an international hit for him, peaking at number 14 on the Dutch Single Top 100, number 25 in Germany and becoming a charting hit in France and in Belgium in both Flanders and French language markets.

== Charts ==
=== Weekly charts ===
Chart (2013–2014)	Peak position
Austria (Ö3 Austria Top 40)	9
Belgium (Ultratop 50 Flanders)	32
Belgium Urban (Ultratop Flanders)	7
Belgium (Ultratop 50 Wallonia)	22
Canada Hot 100 (Billboard)	60
Czech Republic Airplay (ČNS IFPI)	24
Denmark (Tracklisten)	40
Finland (Suomen virallinen lista)	17
France (SNEP)	5
Germany (GfK)	9
Hungary (Rádiós Top 40)	2
Hungary (Single Top 40)	10
Israel International Airplay (Media Forest)	1
Italy (FIMI)	6
Lebanon (The Official Lebanese Top 20)	1
Netherlands (Dutch Top 40)	9
Netherlands (Single Top 100)	14
Poland Airplay (ZPAV)	2
Poland (Video Chart)	3
Romania (Airplay 100)	18
Slovakia Airplay (ČNS IFPI)	8
Slovenia (SloTop50)	6
Spain (Promusicae)	44
Switzerland (Schweizer Hitparade)	8

=== Year-end charts ===
Chart (2013)	Position
Netherlands (Dutch Top 40)	88

Chart (2014)	Position
Belgium (Ultratop Wallonia)	59
Belgium Urban (Ultratop)	19
France (SNEP)	15
Germany (Official German Charts)	67
Hungary (Rádiós Top 40)	20
Hungary (Single Top 40)	62
Israel (Media Forest)	13
Italy (FIMI)	52
Netherlands (Dutch Top 40)	54
Poland (ZPAV)	21
Slovenia (SloTop50)	27
Switzerland (Schweizer Hitparade)	61

== Certifications ==
Region	Certification	Certified units/sales
France	—	65,300
Germany (BVMI)	Gold	150,000^{^}
Italy (FIMI)	Platinum	30,000^{‡}
Sweden (GLF)	Gold	20,000^{‡}
Switzerland (IFPI Switzerland)	Gold	15,000^{^}
^{^} Shipments figures based on certification alone.^{‡} Sales+streaming figures based on certification alone.
