= Sound of Your Heart =

- Canadian single cover

Single by Shawn Hook

from the album Analog Love
- Released: February 17, 2015
- Genre: Pop rock
- Length: 3:20
- Label: Kreative Soul; Hollywood
- Songwriter(s): Todd Clark; Shawn Hook; Stephen Kozmeniuk
- Producer(s): Stephen Kozmeniuk

Shawn Hook singles chronology
"Million Ways" (2014)	"Sound of Your Heart" (2015)	"Relapse" (2016)

Alternate cover
- 2016 re-issue single cover

Music video
- "Sound of Your Heart" on YouTube

"Sound of Your Heart" is a song recorded by Canadian singer-songwriter Shawn Hook for his third studio album, Analog Love (2015). It was released through Kreative Soul Entertainment under license to Universal Music Canada on February 17, 2015, as the album's second single. Reaching the top 25 on the Canadian Hot 100 and being certified Platinum by Music Canada, it is Hook's most successful single to date. The song was re-released internationally in early 2016 through Hollywood Records following Hook signing to the label and has since entered the Billboard Mainstream Top 40 chart and reached the top of the magazine's Dance Club Songs chart.

== Composition ==
"Sound of Your Heart" is a pop and pop rock song written by Todd Clark, Shawn Hook, and Stephen Kozmeniuk about the pain of missing someone you love. It is described by many as very similar to the tune of "La La La", a 2013 song released by Naughty Boy. The song's sound has been described as "dark" and "lush". Hook plays the piano on the track. According to the sheet music published at Musicnotes.com through EMI Music Publishing, the song is composed in the key of F♯ minor and set in common time to a "moderately fast" tempo of approximately 122 BPM. The vocals span two octaves from C♯_{4} through C♯_{6}.

== Commercial performance ==
"Sound of Your Heart" entered the Billboard Canadian Hot 100 at number 100 on the chart dated April 11, 2015. It reached a peak position of 23 on the chart dated June 6, 2015. The song reached number 11 on the Canadian all-genre iTunes chart in May 2015 and peaked at number 12 on the Hot Canadian Digital Songs component chart in June 2015. On the US Dance Club Songs chart, "Sound of Your Heart" went to number one.

== Track listings ==
Digital download – single

1. "Sound of Your Heart" - 3:20

Remixes – EP

1. "Sound of Your Heart" (Dave Aude Remix) - 5:35
2. "Sound of Your Heart" (DJ Boris Remix) - 7:03
3. "Sound of Your Heart" (Jump Smokers Remix) - 3:26
4. "Sound of Your Heart" (Mike D Remix) - 3:13

== Music video ==
The accompanying music video was directed by Alon Isocianu and premiered March 23, 2015.

== Charts and certifications ==
=== Weekly charts ===
Chart (2015–16)	Peak position
Canada (Canadian Hot 100)	23
Canada AC (Billboard)	12
Canada CHR/Top 40 (Billboard)	8
Canada Hot AC (Billboard)	8
US Bubbling Under Hot 100 Singles (Billboard)	5
US Adult Pop Airplay (Billboard)	32
US Dance Club Songs (Billboard)	1
US Pop Airplay (Billboard)	24

=== Year-end charts ===
Chart (2015)	Position
Canada (Canadian Hot 100)	47
Chart (2016)	Position
US Dance Club Songs (Billboard)	29

=== Certifications ===
Region	Certification	Certified units/sales
Canada (Music Canada)	2× Platinum	160,000^{‡}
^{‡} Sales+streaming figures based on certification alone.

== Release history ==
Country	Date	Format	Label	Ref.
Canada	February 17, 2015	Digital download	Kreative Soul; Universal Music Canada	
United States	February 17, 2015	Digital download	Kreative Soul; Universal Music Canada	
United States	January 5, 2016	Contemporary hit radio	Universal Music Canada; Hollywood	
United Kingdom	January 22, 2016	Digital download	Hollywood	
United States	January 22, 2016	Digital download (re-release)	Hollywood	
United States	February 29, 2016	Hot adult contemporary	Universal Music Canada; Hollywood	
Worldwide	April 15, 2016	Digital download – remixes EP	Kreative Soul; Universal Music Canada; Hollywood	

== See also ==
- List of number-one dance singles of 2016 (U.S.)
