= Elvis Duran =

American radio personality (born 1964)

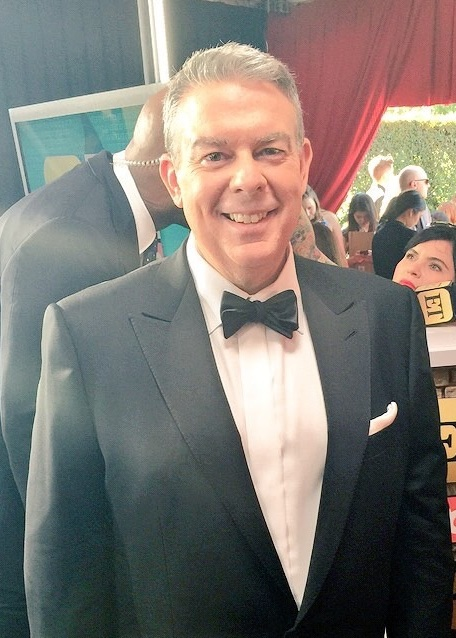
- Duran in 2015
- Born: Barry Brian Cope; August 5, 1964 (age 62); McKinney, Texas, U.S.
- Spouse: Alex Carr (m. 2019)
- Presenting career
- Show: Elvis Duran and the Morning Show
- Stations: Z100, Y100, Q102, 107.5 KISS-FM
- Time slot: Monday-Friday 6 am–10am ET
- Country: United States

Elvis Duran (born Barry Brian Cope; August 5, 1964) is an American radio personality. He is the host of the daily morning radio program Elvis Duran and the Morning Show in New York on Z100 and in syndication on Premiere Networks.

Before his job at Z100, Duran's previous radio work included a stint as an on-air personality at WIOQ in Philadelphia. He served as WIOQ's program director from May 1989 until just before he was fired in February 1990. In October 1991, Duran became both the program director and morning show host of KBTS (now KGSR) in Austin, Texas.

Prior to working at Z100, Duran also worked evenings at Z-93 with sidekick "Hot Henrietta" in Atlanta, and at Power 104 KRBE in Houston. He began his run at Z100 hosting the afternoon slot until April 1996, when Tom Poleman, the newly appointed program director (previously at KRBE Houston), moved Duran to the morning slot, where he has been ever since.

== Elvis Duran and the Morning Show ==
Duran began hosting his daily radio show on New York's Z100 in April 1996. The show expanded to Sussex County NJ in 2003 on WHCY-FM Max 106.3 and Y100/WHYI-FM in Miami–Ft. Lauderdale on May 22, 2006. The show signed a national deal in March 2009 with the radio syndication company, Premiere Networks, a subsidiary of Clear Channel.

Elvis Duran and the Morning Show has since added more than 75 stations including 101.1 Y101/WHYA-FM Cape Cod, 96.5 KISS FM/WAKS-FM in Cleveland, Q102/WIOQ-FM in Philadelphia, WERZ (107.1 FM) in Portsmouth, New Hampshire, and Z96.3 in Manhattan, Kansas. The show premiered on its first Canadian station, CIRR-FM in Toronto, the world's first commercially licensed LGBTQ radio station, on October 5, 2020. The show also airs on XM Satellite Radio, iHeartRadio.com, and the iHeartRadio mobile app. The show had the Elvis Duran Replay Channel on iHeartradio but was removed in 2019 in favor of the On Demand channel.

== Elvis Duran's Artist of the Month ==
Since 2013, Duran has had a segment on NBC's Today show with Kathie Lee Gifford and Hoda Kotb called "Elvis Duran's Artist of the Month", where Duran selects a new up and coming artist to spotlight each month or twice a month. Although a majority of the artists are American, international acts have been featured as well.

== Other media ventures ==
In 2007, Duran launched his own entertainment company, The Elvis Duran Group (EDG). Owned by Duran and talent agent David Katz, the company focuses on content creation across all media. EDG's first foray into television resulted was the four-episode, 2010 Spike TV series Phowned, an iteration of the radio show's Phone Taps prank-call segment.

In 2019, he released his first book through Simon & Schuster titled, Where Do I Begin? Stories (I Sort of Remember) from a Life Lived Out Loud. The book became a New York Times bestseller.

== Awards ==
Duran and EDMS have received several awards and nominations, such as "Best Morning Show" by New York's Achievement in Radio Awards, "Personality of the Year" by the Radio Music Awards, "Best Personality" by Radio & Records, "Best Top 40 Disc Jockey" nomination by Billboard Magazine Radio, and "Best Major Market Top 40 Air Personality" by Billboard/Airplay Monitor. The National Association of Broadcasters recently nominated EDMS for the 2012 NAB Marconi Award for Network/Syndicated Personality of the Year. In 2014, Duran was featured on Out magazine's "20th Anniversary Out 100" list as one of the most influential figures in the LGBT community. In 2015, Duran was inducted into the National Radio Hall of Fame as the Music Format On-Air Personality, and the Today Show celebrated this milestone.

Duran served as an event chair for the 2016 GLAAD Manhattan Awards, where he was honored for his contributions to the community. On Thursday, March 2, 2017, Duran was honored with a star on the Hollywood Walk of Fame. On April 9, 2018, he was inducted into the National Association of Broadcasters's Broadcasting Hall of Fame, along with television game shows Jeopardy! and Wheel of Fortune.

== Philanthropy ==
Duran serves on the board of directors for Rock & Rawhide, a non-profit organization that aims to increase adoptions while also providing a quieter, stress-free life for animals surrendered to shelters. Duran also contributes to the Staten Island Zoo's annual endowment and Robin Hood Foundation. Having publicly come out as gay in 2010, Duran is also engaged in philanthropic efforts affecting the Lesbian, Gay, Bisexual and Transgender (LGBT) community, and works closely with GLAAD and The Trevor Project.

== Personal life ==
Duran lost 110 pounds by undergoing bariatric sleeve surgery in 2014. He came out as gay during a 2010 broadcast, and was grand marshal of the Miami Beach Gay Pride Parade in 2016.

Duran and his partner Alex Carr were engaged on July 13, 2018. They were married in a civil ceremony at the Richmond County Surrogate Court on Carr's native Staten Island, New York on August 22, 2019, and had a wedding ceremony on September 14, 2019, in Santa Fe, New Mexico.

== Filmography ==
- Die Hard with a Vengeance (1995) - Radio D.J.
- Sharknado 3: Oh Hell No! (2015) - Himself
- Law & Order: Special Victims Unit (2021) - Paul Landy
