= For Friends and Family Only Tour =

2024–2025 concert tour by Shawn Mendes

- World tour by Shawn Mendes
- Promotional poster
- Location: Asia; Europe; North America; South America
- Associated album: Shawn
- Start date: August 8, 2024
- End date: April 8, 2025
- No. of shows: 19

Shawn Mendes concert chronology
- Wonder: The World Tour (2022); For Friends and Family Only Tour (2024–2025); On the Road Again Tour (2025)

For Friends and Family Only Tour is the sixth concert tour by Canadian singer-songwriter Shawn Mendes, in support of his fifth studio album Shawn (2024). The concert cycle began in Woodstock, New York on August 8, 2024, at the Bearsville Theater, and concluded in San Juan, Puerto Rico on April 8, 2025, at the Coliseo de Puerto Rico.

== Announcements ==
Mendes announced the tour on August 1, 2024, with several festival appearances and intimate shows across the globe spanning from August 2024 through April 2025. Tickets went on sale on August 6, 2024 through exclusive presales labeled as "Friends & Family Fan Onsale". On October 11, 2024, Mendes announced that the concert film titled Shawn Mendes: For Friends and Family Only (A Live Concert Film) would be screening for one night only in cinemas on November 14, 2024.

== Set list ==
The following set list is obtained from the November 25, 2024, show in Toronto. It is not intended to represent all dates throughout the tour.

1. "That's the Dream"
2. "Heavy"
3. "That'll Be the Day"
4. "Stitches"
5. "Isn't That Enough"
6. "Rollin' Right Along"
7. "Nobody Knows"
8. "Heart of Gold"
9. "It'll Be Okay"
10. "Hallelujah"
11. "In Between"
12. "Who I Am"
13. "The Mountain"
14. "Why Why Why"
  Encore
15. "There's Nothing Holdin' Me Back"
16. "In My Blood"

== Tour dates ==
List of 2024 concerts
Date (2024)	City	Country	Venue
August 8	Woodstock	United States	Bearsville Theater
August 13	London	England	Theatre Royal Drury Lane
September 22 (Note: This concert was part of Rock in Rio.)	Rio de Janeiro	Brazil	Barra Olympic Park
October 14	Nashville	United States	Ryman Auditorium
October 18	Brooklyn	United States	Brooklyn Paramount
October 22	Los Angeles	United States	The Ford
October 24	Seattle	United States	Paramount Theatre
October 28	Morrison	United States	Red Rocks Amphitheatre
November 13	Berlin	Germany	Tempodrom
November 16 (Note: This concert was part of Corona Capital.)	Mexico City	Mexico	Autódromo Hermanos Rodríguez
November 25	Toronto	Canada	Massey Hall

List of 2025 concerts
Date (2025)	City	Country	Venue
March 8 (Note: This concert was part of Lollapalooza India.)	Mumbai	India	Mahalaxmi Racecourse
March 22 (Note: This concert was part of Lollapalooza Argentina.)	Buenos Aires	Argentina	Hipódromo de San Isidro
March 23 (Note: This concert was part of Lollapalooza Chile.)	Santiago	Chile	Bicentennial Park of Cerrillos
March 27 (Note: This concert was part of Festival Estéreo Picnic.)	Bogotá	Colombia	Simón Bolívar Park
March 29 (Note: This concert was part of Lollapalooza Brazil.)	São Paulo	Brazil	Interlagos Circuit
April 1	Lima	Peru	Costa 21
April 5	San José	Costa Rica	Coca-Cola Amphitheatre
April 8	San Juan	Puerto Rico	Coliseo de Puerto Rico
