= Shawn Mendes: For Friends and Family Only (A Live Concert Film) =

2024 concert film

- Theatrical release poster
- Directed by: Connor Brashier; Anthony Wilson
- Produced by: Adam Bodey
- Starring: Shawn Mendes
- Cinematography: Jordan Pollack
- Music by: Shawn Mendes
- Distributed by: Trafalgar Releasing
- Release date: November 14, 2024
- Running time: 90 minutes
- Country: United States
- Language: English
- Box office: $44,264

Shawn Mendes: For Friends and Family Only (A Live Concert Film) is a 2024 concert film starring the Canadian singer-songwriter Shawn Mendes, and co-directed by Connor Brashier and Anthony Wilson. It was released globally in select theaters on November 14, 2024. The film depicts Mendes as he performs all songs from his fifth studio album, Shawn (2024) on an intimate concert tour, titled "For Friends and Family Only" (2024–2025).

The concert was filmed on August 8, 2024, at the Bearsville Theatre in Woodstock, New York, with a 500-seat capacity. During its one-night-only movie theater release, the film grossed a total of $44,264, from Australian and British screenings. On November 17, 2024, it was subsequently made available for digital renting on the streaming service website Veeps. The tour depicted on the film received mostly positive reviews, with critics praising its intimate nature and the lyrical content of the songs.

== Synopsis ==
The film depicts Shawn Mendes as he performs his fifth studio album, Shawn, in its entirety as part of an intimate concert tour, titled "For Friends and Family Only". It also provides insight to the creation process for the album, along with backstage footage and commentary on the meaning of each song. The concert features footage from the first time Mendes performed live, since the cancellation of the Wonder: The World Tour.

Before the show begins, fans start gathering in line to enter the venue, chanting and singing old songs from Mendes' catalog. Along with backstage preparation, Mendes starts the show singing "Isn't That Enough", followed by "That's the Dream" and "Heavy". Prior to "Heart of Gold", he dedicated the song to his late childhood friend, Dejomi. After that, "Rollin' Right Along", "Who I Am", and "That'll Be the Day" were performed.

Along with introduction of his crew and band members, Mendes sang "Nobody Knows" followed by "In Between". Before singing "The Mountain", Mendes addresses the rumors about his sexuality, expressing that it is something he is still figuring out. He then proceeded to sing the previously released single, "Why Why Why". Finally, the show ends with a rendition of Leonard Cohen's song, "Hallelujah".

== Background ==
In 2022, Shawn Mendes called off his fifth concert tour, Wonder: The World Tour, in order to focus on his mental health. The tour lasted for only seven of the originally planned shows, and was intended to promote the release his fourth studio album, Wonder (2020). Mendes later explained that he "had absolutely no idea who [he] was", and could not "step into a studio without falling into complete panic". During an interview with The Wall Street Journal, the singer opened up about his mental health, stating: "It has become clear that I need to take the time I've never taken personally, to ground myself and come back stronger".

Through his career hiatus, the singer expressed that his relationship with his friends and family was pivotal to his return to music. On July 31, 2024, Mendes announced his next album, Shawn, along with its release date, and the confirmation of the first two singles, "Why Why Why" and "Isn't That Enough". During a statement, where he announced the album, he dubbed it as his "most musically intimate and lyrically honest work to date", and praised his family and closest friends for helping him throughout its conception. Ultimately, these close relationships would inspire the intimate setting for the concert tour, For Friends and Family Only.

== Conception and promotion ==
"Performing this album for the first time in such an intimate setting, surrounded by close friends, family [...] was truly special. I'm excited for fans around the world to feel that same connection through the film and get to experience the Friends & Family shows".

— Shawn Mendes, reflecting on the concert's unique nature.

To promote the album Shawn, Mendes embarked on an intimate concert tour of theatre shows throughout the places where he recorded the album. Billed as "for friends and family only", its selected venues hold between 2,000 and 3,000 attendees. The concerts started at the Bearsville Theater in Woodstock, New York on August 8, 2024, coinciding with the release of the first singles from the album, "Why Why Why" and "Isn't That Enough" and concluded in Seattle on October 24, 2024. The show's set list contains the songs off Shawn "from top to bottom".

The singer commented that it was his first time performing for a large crowd in two years, as well as the first time playing the album live. He expressed his desire to release the concert film for fans worldwide to be able to experience the concerts.

Afterwards, Mendes announced that he would postpone the release of Shawn, from October 18 to November 15, 2024. On October 10, 2024, the singer announced the release of the accompanying concert film for the album. It was filmed at the Bearsville Theatre in Woodstock, New York, with capacity for 500 seats, which took place on August 8, 2024, and, along with the performances, it features footage of the singer explaining the inspiration behind every song on the album.

== Release ==
The concert film was released on November 14, 2024, the night before the release of the album, Shawn. It was released for one night only, in select theaters worldwide. On October 24, the singer released the trailer for the film. The teaser depicts an animated car rolling into a drive-in movie theater, while the concert film is played on the big screen amongst some trees, with Mendes expressing that he wants the concert to "feel like light [...] effortless and fun and free".

Tickets for the worldwide screenings of the film were made available through the film's official website. During its limited one-night-only screening, Shawn Mendes: For Friends and Family Only (A Live Concert Film) grossed a total of $44,264 at the box office. Of this total grossing, $11,838 came from Australia (Note: The grossing for Australian screenings is presented as $11,637 at the Box Office Mojo website.) and $32,426 came from the UK. On November 17, 2024, three days after its limited theater release, the movie was subsequently made available for digital renting on the streaming service website Veeps.

== Reception ==
The 2024 tour, For Friends and Family Only, which is depicted on the concert film, received positive reviews from critics. Karen Bliss from Rolling Stone highlighted the show's more personal, more intimate tone. She added that the show's "most powerful moment" was Mendes' introduction speech for "Heart of Gold", which lyrics talk about the death of the singer's childhood friend. Writing for The Seattle Times, Yasmeen Wafai commented positively regarding the intimate nature of the concert, as well as the personal lyrics to the songs. The writer stated that, after Mendes talked about his late friend, the live music at the show felt powerful and "electric".

In a review for Toronto Star, Vernon Ayiku gave the concert a four out of four review, calling it an "emotional and triumphant return" to the stage for Mendes. He pointed up that the singer seemed happy to be performing. Clash's Robin Murray wrote that it was a "beautiful, tender performance", where the album was unraveled in its entirety, while the performer interacted with the audience between songs to "illuminate his intent". The writer also noted that Mendes was "clearly relishing being back out in front of his fans".

Brad Wheeler, writing for The Globe and Mail, gave the concert a negative review, calling it an "underplay" for Mendes. Meanwhile the songs from the album were described as "a collection of mellow, acoustic expressions from an artist on the mend", that were not up to the singer's previous, more popular standards.
