= List of awards and nominations received by Shawn Mendes =

Shawn Mendes awards and nominations
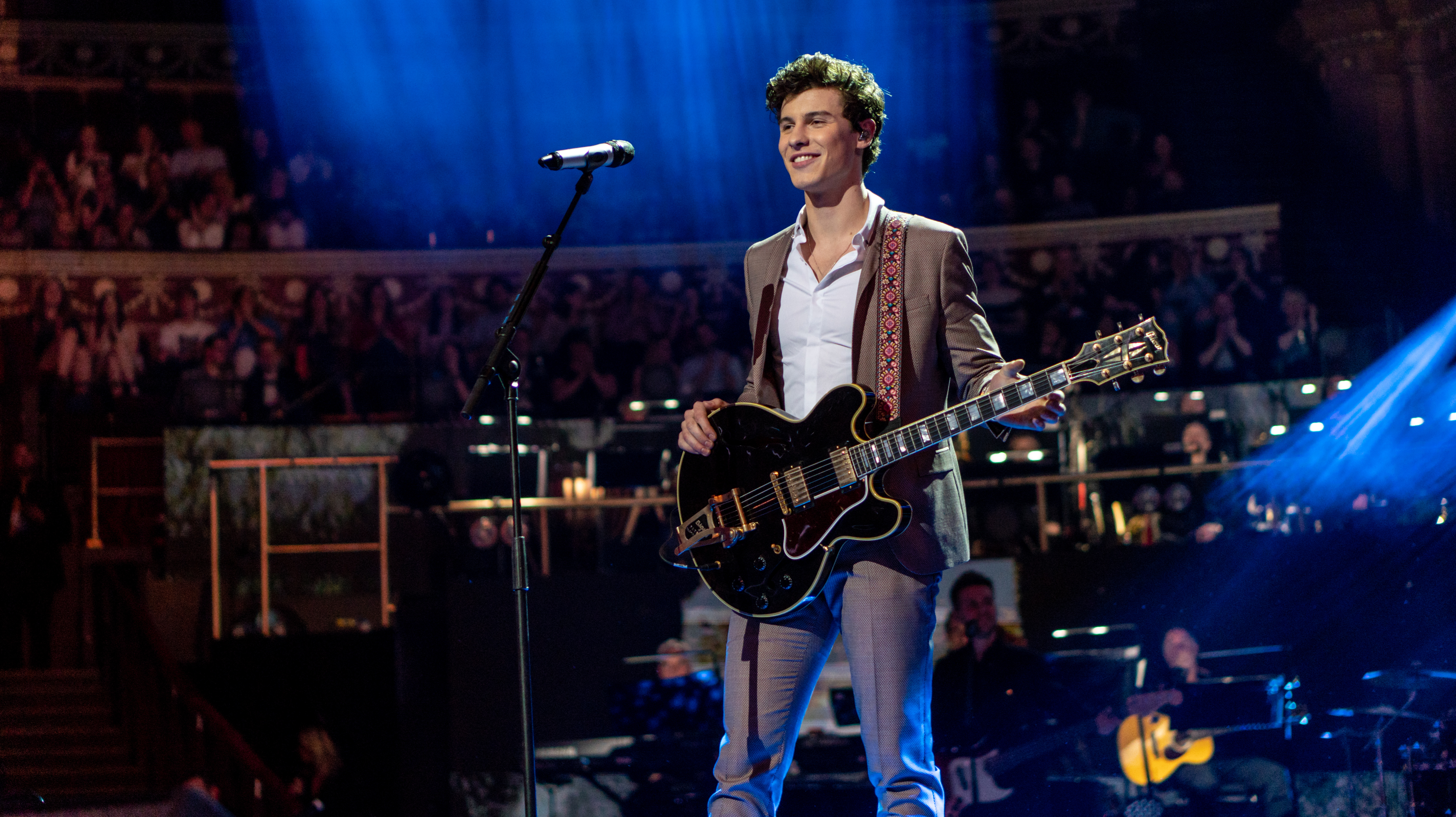
- Mendes performing at The Queen's Birthday Party in 2018
Awards and nominations
Award	Wins	Nominations
American Music Awards	3	6
AMFT Awards	1	1
APRA Music Awards	0	1
ARIA Awards	0	2
BBC Radio 1's Teen Awards	3	6
Beano Awards	1	1
Billboard Live Music Awards	2	3
Billboard Music Awards	1	7
Billboard.com Mid-Year Music Awards	0	2
BMI London Awards	1	1
BMI Pop Awards	6	6
Bravo Otto	3	5
Brit Awards	0	1
Canadian Radio Music Awards	1	8
Capricho Awards	1	4
CMT Music Awards	0	1
E! People's Choice Awards	4	11
Echo Music Prize	0	1
FiFi Awards	0	1
GAFFA Awards (Denmark)	0	4
GAFFA Awards (Sweden)	0	1
Gaon Chart Music Awards	1	1
Global Awards	1	10
GQ Men of the Year Awards	1	1
Grammy Award	0	3
Hollywood Music in Media Awards	1	1
iHeartRadio Much Music Video Awards	8	22
iHeartRadio Music Awards	1	23
iHeartRadio Titanium Award	4	4
Japan Gold Disc Award	1	1
Joox Thailand Music Awards	0	1
Juno Awards	13	27
Latin American Music Awards	0	1
Lo Nuestro Awards	0	1
LOS40 Music Awards	0	6
Melon Music Awards	0	1
Melty Future Awards	0	2
Meus Prêmios Nick	0	3
MTV Europe Music Award	11	23
MTV Italian Music Awards	0	2
MTV Millennial Awards	0	1
MTV Millennial Awards Brazil	1	2
MTV Movie & TV Awards	0	1
MTV Video Music Award	2	13
MTV Video Music Awards Japan	2	3
MTV Video Play Awards	2	2
Myx Music Awards	0	1
Nickelodeon Kids' Choice Awards	6	10
Nickelodeon Kids' Choice Awards Abu Dhabi	0	1
Nickelodeon Argentina Kids' Choice Awards	0	1
Nickelodeon Mexico Kids' Choice Awards	0	2
NRJ Music Awards	2	8
Official Charts Company	2	2
PLAY - Portuguese Music Awards	0	1
Polaris Music Prize	0	1
Pollstar Awards	0	1
Premios Juventud	0	2
Radio Disney Music Awards	2	10
Rockbjörnen	1	3
RTHK International Pop Poll Awards	3	3
Shorty Awards	1	1
SOCAN Awards	20	20
Spotify Awards	0	1
Spotify Plaque	5	5
Streamy Awards	1	1
Teen Choice Awards	9	25
Telehit Awards	2	5
The Lockdown Awards	1	1
Ticketmaster Awards	1	1

Totals (Note: Certain award groups do not simply award one winner. They acknowledge several different recipients, have runners-up, and have third place. Since this is a specific recognition and is different from losing an award, runner-up mentions are considered wins in this award tally. For simplification and to avoid errors, each award in this list has been presumed to have had a prior nomination.)
- Wins: 127
- Nominations: 329

Canadian singer-songwriter Shawn Mendes has won more than 122 awards during his career. His debut album Handwritten was released in 2015 and debuted at No. 1 on the US Billboard 200 chart and nominated for Album of the Year award at Juno Awards. Mendes is also awarded the Allan Slaight Honor from the Canadian Walk of Fame. He won Favorite Breakout Artist award at the 42nd People's Choice Awards.

His second studio album Illuminate was released in 2016 and spawned the singles "Treat You Better" and "Mercy" and in 2017 Mendes released "There's Nothing Holdin' Me Back" as the third single in his second studio album and received a Juno Award and MTV Europe Music Award. At the 2017 American Music Awards Mendes won the American Music Award for Favorite Adult Contemporary Artist and latter won the same award in 2018 ceremony.

In 2018, Mendes released his self-titled third studio album, releasing the single "In My Blood". Mendes has been nominated for three awards at the 2018 MTV Video Music Awards. Mendes was named the inaugural Artist of the Year award at the 2018 Billboard Live Music Awards. Mendes was nominated for two awards at the 61st Annual Grammy Awards for Best Pop Vocal Album and "In My Blood" for Song of the Year. Mendes was nominated for 6 awards at the 2019 Juno Awards winning five of them including Album of the Year and Single of the Year for "In My Blood" making Mendes the 4th artist to win Single of the Year for two consecutive year tied with Anne Murray, Glass Tiger and Alanis Morissette. Mendes was nominated for six awards at 2019 MTV Video Music Awards, winning two for "Señorita". Mendes was nominated for five awards at the 2019 Teen Choice Awards winning three awards. Mendes was nominated for four awards at the 45th People's Choice Awards winning two awards. Mendes was nominated for 6 awards at the 2019 MTV Europe Music Awards winning the Artist of the Year award. In November 2019 Mendes was nominated in 62nd Annual Grammy Awards for Best Pop Duo/Group Performance. Mendes was nominated for two American Music Award winning Collaboration of the Year award for "Señorita". In January 2020 Mendes was nominated for seven awards at the 2020 iHeartRadio Music Awards tying with Billie Eilish also with seven nominations latter that month Mendes was nominated for awards at the 2020 Juno Awards. In June 2020 Mendes won the Juno Award for Single and Artist of the Year making Mendes the first artist in the Juno Awards history to win the Single of the Year award for third consecutive year and the second artist to win the Artist of the Year award for two consecutive year tied with The Weeknd who won the award in 2015 and 2016. Mendes won five awards at the SOCAN Awards in September 2020 which makes him the most awarded creator in a single year at the SOCAN Awards since its launched in 1990. Mendes also won the Juno Award (Fans Choice) in 2021.

In 2022 Mendes received the Juno International Achievement Award which recognizes Canadian artists who have attained exemplary success on the world stage. He became the youngest recipient of this award and also became the eighth person to receive this honor joining Alanis Morissette, Arcade Fire, Bryan Adams, Celine Dion, Drake, Sarah McLachlan and Shania Twain

== Awards and nominations ==
Name of the award ceremony, year presented, award category, nominee(s) of the award, and the result of the nomination
Award ceremony	Year (Note: Indicates the year of ceremony. Each year is linked to the article about the awards held that year, wherever possible.)	Category	Recipient(s) and nominee(s)	Result	Ref.
American Music Awards	2016	New Artist of the Year	Himself	Nominated	
American Music Awards	2017	Favorite Adult Contemporary Artist	Himself	Won	
American Music Awards	2018	Favorite Adult Contemporary Artist	Himself	Won	
American Music Awards	2018	Favorite Social Artist	Himself	Nominated	
American Music Awards	2019	Favorite Social Artist	Himself	Nominated	
American Music Awards	2019	Collaboration of the Year	"Señorita" (with Camila Cabello)	Won	
AMFT Awards (Note: AMFT Awards is an online awards group.)	2019	Best Pop Duo/Group Performance	"Señorita" (with Camila Cabello)	Won	
APRA Music Awards	2018	International Work of the Year	"There's Nothing Holdin' Me Back"	Nominated	
ARIA Music Awards	2017	Best International Artist	Himself	Nominated	
ARIA Music Awards	2019	Best International Artist	Himself	Nominated	
BBC Radio 1's Teen Awards	2016	Best Single	"Stitches"	Won	
BBC Radio 1's Teen Awards	2016	Best International Artist	Himself	Won	
BBC Radio 1's Teen Awards	2017	Best International Artist	Himself	Nominated	
BBC Radio 1's Teen Awards	2018	Best International Solo Artist	Himself	Won	
BBC Radio 1's Teen Awards	2019	Best International Solo Artist	Himself	Nominated	
BBC Radio 1's Teen Awards	2019	Best Single	"Señorita" (with Camila Cabello)	Nominated	
Beano Awards	2020	Best Song	"Señorita" (with Camila Cabello)	Won	
Billboard Live Music (Touring) Awards	2017	Breakthrough Artist	Himself	Nominated	
Billboard Live Music (Touring) Awards	2018	Artist of the Year	Himself	Won	
Billboard Live Music (Touring) Awards	2019	Concert and Marketing Promotions Award	Verizon Up x Shawn Mendes x Camilla Cabello Customer Loyalty Promotion	Won	
Billboard Music Awards	2017	Top Artist	Himself	Nominated	
Billboard Music Awards	2017	Top Male Artist	Himself	Nominated	
Billboard Music Awards	2017	Top Social Artist	Himself	Nominated	
Billboard Music Awards	2018	Top Social Artist	Himself	Nominated	
Billboard Music Awards	2020	Top Radio Songs Artist	Himself	Nominated	
Billboard Music Awards	2020	Top Hot 100 Song	"Señorita" (with Camila Cabello)	Nominated	
Billboard Music Awards	2020	Top Collaboration	"Señorita" (with Camila Cabello)	Won	
BMI London Awards	2020	London Pop Award Songs	"Señorita"	Won	
BMI Pop Awards	2017	Award Winning Songs	"Treat You Better"	Won	
BMI Pop Awards	2018	Award Winning Songs	"Mercy"	Won	
BMI Pop Awards	2018	Award Winning Songs	"There's Nothing Holdin' Me Back"	Won	
BMI Pop Awards	2019	Award Winning Songs	"In My Blood"	Won	
BMI Pop Awards	2020	Award Winning Songs	"If I Can't Have You"	Won	
BMI Pop Awards	2020	Award Winning Songs	"Señorita"	Won	
Bravo Otto	2017	Super Male Singer	Himself	Won	
Bravo Otto	2018	Singer	Himself	Gold	
Bravo Otto	2019	International Singer	Himself	Nominated	
Bravo Otto	2020	International Singer	Himself	Silver	
Bravo Otto	2022	International Singer	Himself	Nominated	
Brit Awards	2019	International Male Solo Artist	Himself	Nominated	
Canadian Radio Music Awards	2015	Best New Group or Solo Artist: CHR	"Life of the Party"	Nominated	
Canadian Radio Music Awards	2016	SOCAN Song of the Year	"Something Big"	Nominated	
Canadian Radio Music Awards	2016	SOCAN Song of the Year	"Stitches"	Nominated	
Canadian Radio Music Awards	2016	Fans Choice	Himself	Nominated	
Canadian Radio Music Awards	2016	Chart Topper Award	Himself	Won	
Canadian Radio Music Awards	2017	Fans Choice	Himself	Nominated	
Canadian Radio Music Awards	2017	SOCAN Song of the Year	"Treat You Better"	Nominated	
Canadian Radio Music Awards	2018	Fan's Choice	Himself	Nominated	
Capricho Awards	2015	International Male Singer	Himself	Nominated	
Capricho Awards	2017	International Crush	Himself	Won	
Capricho Awards	2017	International Hit	"There's Nothing Holdin' Me Back"	Nominated	
Capricho Awards	2020	Real Couple	Himself and Camila Cabello	Nominated	
CMT Music Awards	2019	CMT Performance of the Year	"Keep Me In Mind" (with Zac Brown Band)	Nominated	
E! People's Choice Awards	2016	Favorite Breakout Artist	Himself	Won	
E! People's Choice Awards	2017	Favorite Male Artist	Himself	Nominated	
E! People's Choice Awards	2018	The Male Artist of 2018	Himself	Won	
E! People's Choice Awards	2018	The Most Hype Worthy Canadian of 2018	Himself	Nominated	
E! People's Choice Awards	2018	The Album of 2018	Shawn Mendes	Nominated	
E! People's Choice Awards	2018	The Song of 2018	"In My Blood"	Nominated	
E! People's Choice Awards	2019	The Male Artist of 2019	Himself	Won	
E! People's Choice Awards	2019	The Social Celebrity of 2019	Himself	Nominated	
E! People's Choice Awards	2019	The Song of 2019	"Señorita" (with Camila Cabello)	Won	
E! People's Choice Awards	2019	The Music Video of 2019	"Señorita" (with Camila Cabello)	Nominated	
E! People's Choice Awards	2021	The Male Artist of 2021	Himself	Nominated	
Echo Awards	2017	Best International Pop/Rock Male Artist	Himself	Nominated	
FiFi Awards	2018	Fragrance of the Year: Popular	Shawn Mendes Signature	Nominated	
GAFFA Awards (Denmark)	2019	Best Foreign Album	Shawn Mendes	Nominated	
GAFFA Awards (Denmark)	2020	Best International Hit	"Señorita" (with Camila Cabello)	Longlisted	
GAFFA Awards (Denmark)	2021	International Solo Artist of the Year	Himself	Longlisted	
GAFFA Awards (Denmark)	2021	International Album of the Year	Wonder	Longlisted	
Gaon Chart Music Awards	2018	International Rising Star of the Year	Himself	Won	
Global Awards	2018	Best Song	"There's Nothing Holdin' Me Back"	Nominated	
Global Awards	2018	Best Male	Himself	Won	
Global Awards	2018	Best Pop	Himself	Nominated	
Global Awards	2018	Mass Appeal Award	Himself	Longlisted	
Global Awards	2019	Best Song	"In My Blood"	Nominated	
Global Awards	2019	Best Male	Himself	Nominated	
Global Awards	2019	Best Pop	Himself	Nominated	
Global Awards	2020	Best Pop	Himself	Nominated	
Global Awards	2020	Best Male	Himself	Nominated	
Global Awards	2020	Best Song of 2019	"Señorita" (with Camila Cabello)	Nominated	
GQ Men of the Year Awards	2020	Solo Artist of the Year	Himself	Won	
Grammy Awards	2019	Song of the Year	"In My Blood"	Nominated	
Grammy Awards	2019	Best Pop Vocal Album	Shawn Mendes	Nominated	
Grammy Awards	2020	Best Pop Duo/Group Performance	"Señorita" (with Camila Cabello)	Nominated	
Hollywood Music in Media Awards	2020	Live Concert for Visual Media	Shawn Mendes: Live in Concert	Won	
iHeartRadio Much Music Video Awards	2015	Best Pop Video	"Something Big"	Nominated	
iHeartRadio Much Music Video Awards	2015	Fan Fave Video	"Something Big"	Won	
iHeartRadio Much Music Video Awards	2015	Fan Fave Artist or Group	Himself	Nominated	
iHeartRadio Much Music Video Awards	2015	Most Buzzworthy Canadian	Himself	Nominated	
iHeartRadio Much Music Video Awards	2016	Video of the Year	"I Know What You Did Last Summer" (with Camila Cabello)	Nominated	
iHeartRadio Much Music Video Awards	2016	Best Pop Video	"I Know What You Did Last Summer" (with Camila Cabello)	Won	
iHeartRadio Much Music Video Awards	2016	Fan Fave Video	"I Know What You Did Last Summer" (with Camila Cabello)	Won	
iHeartRadio Much Music Video Awards	2016	Most Buzzworthy Canadian	Himself	Nominated	
iHeartRadio Much Music Video Awards	2016	Fan Fave Artist or Group	Himself	Nominated	
iHeartRadio Much Music Video Awards	2016	iHeartRadio Canadian Single of the Year	"Stitches"	Nominated	
iHeartRadio Much Music Video Awards	2017	Video of the Year	"Mercy"	Nominated	
iHeartRadio Much Music Video Awards	2017	Best Pop Video	"Mercy"	Won	
iHeartRadio Much Music Video Awards	2017	Most Buzzworthy Canadian	Himself	Nominated	
iHeartRadio Much Music Video Awards	2017	Fan Fave Artist or Group	Himself	Nominated	
iHeartRadio Much Music Video Awards	2018	Best Pop Artist or Group	Himself	Won	
iHeartRadio Much Music Video Awards	2018	Artist of the Year	Himself	Won	
iHeartRadio Much Music Video Awards	2018	Best Director	"In My Blood" (with director Jay Martin)	Nominated	
iHeartRadio Much Music Video Awards	2018	Best Collaboration	"Youth" (with Khalid)	Nominated	
iHeartRadio Much Music Video Awards	2018	Fan Fave Artist	Himself	Won	
iHeartRadio Much Music Video Awards	2018	Video of the Year	"In My Blood"	Nominated	
iHeartRadio Much Music Video Awards	2018	Fan Fave Video	"In My Blood"	Won	
iHeartRadio Much Music Video Awards	2018	Fan Fave Single	"In My Blood"	Nominated	
iHeartRadio Music Awards	2015	Best Fan Army	Himself	Nominated	
iHeartRadio Music Awards	2016	Best New Artist	Himself	Nominated	
iHeartRadio Music Awards	2016	Best Fan Army	Himself	Nominated	
iHeartRadio Music Awards	2017	Male Artist of the Year	Himself	Nominated	
iHeartRadio Music Awards	2017	Best Cover Song	"Here" (Note: Originally released by Alessia Cara.)	Nominated	
iHeartRadio Music Awards	2017	Best Fan Army	Himself	Nominated	
iHeartRadio Music Awards	2018	Male Artist of the Year	Himself	Nominated	
iHeartRadio Music Awards	2018	Best Fan Army	Himself	Nominated	
iHeartRadio Music Awards	2018	Best Cover Song	"All We Got" (Note: Originally released by Chance the Rapper.)	Nominated	
iHeartRadio Music Awards	2018	Best Music Video	"There's Nothing Holdin' Me Back"	Nominated	
iHeartRadio Music Awards	2018	Best Lyrics	"There's Nothing Holdin' Me Back"	Nominated	
iHeartRadio Music Awards	2019	Male Artist of the Year	Himself	Nominated	
iHeartRadio Music Awards	2019	Best Fan Army	Himself	Nominated	
iHeartRadio Music Awards	2019	Best Lyrics	"In My Blood"	Nominated	
iHeartRadio Music Awards	2019	Best Cover Song	"Under Pressure" (Note: Originally released by Queen and David Bowie.) (with teddy<3)	Nominated	
iHeartRadio Music Awards	2019	Song That Left Us Shook	"Youth" (with Khalid)	Nominated	
iHeartRadio Music Awards	2020	Best Collaboration	"Señorita" (with Camila Cabello)	Won	
iHeartRadio Music Awards	2020	Song of the Year	"Señorita" (with Camila Cabello)	Nominated	
iHeartRadio Music Awards	2020	Best Lyrics	"Señorita" (with Camila Cabello)	Nominated	
iHeartRadio Music Awards	2020	Best Music Video	"Señorita" (with Camila Cabello)	Nominated	
iHeartRadio Music Awards	2020	Best Remix	"Lover (Remix)" (with Taylor Swift)	Nominated	
iHeartRadio Music Awards	2020	Male Artist of the Year	Himself	Nominated	
iHeartRadio Music Awards	2020	Best Fan Army	Himself	Nominated	
iHeartRadio Music Awards	2021	Best Fan Army	Himself	Nominated	
iHeartRadio Music Awards	2021	Best Cover Song	"Can't Take My Eyes Off You" (Note: Originally released by Frankie Valli.)	Nominated	
iHeartRadio Music Awards	2022	Best Cover Song	"Happier Than Ever" (Note: Originally released by Billie Eilish.)	Nominated	
iHeart Titanium Award (Note: The iHeartRadio Titanium Award is an award which recognized artists who have reached a threshold of a billion Total Audience Spins.)	2018	1 Billion Total Audience Spins on iHeartRadio Stations	"There's Nothing Holdin' Me Back"	Won	
iHeart Titanium Award	2020	1 Billion Total Audience Spins on iHeartRadio Stations	"If I Can't Have You"	Won	
iHeart Titanium Award	2020	1 Billion Total Audience Spins on iHeartRadio Stations	"In My Blood"	Won	
iHeart Titanium Award	2020	1 Billion Total Audience Spins on iHeartRadio Stations	"Señorita" (with Camila Cabello)	Won	
Japan Gold Disc Award	2018	Best 3 New Artists (International)	Himself	Won	
Joox Thailand Music Awards	2020	International Artist of the Year	Himself	Nominated	
Juno Awards	2015	Breakthrough Artist of the Year	Himself	Nominated	
Juno Awards	2016	Artist of the Year	Himself	Nominated	
Juno Awards	2016	Fan Choice Award	Himself	Nominated	
Juno Awards	2016	Album of the Year	Handwritten	Nominated	
Juno Awards	2016	Pop Album of the Year	Handwritten	Nominated	
Juno Awards	2017	Artist of the Year	Himself	Nominated	
Juno Awards	2017	Fan Choice Award	Himself	Won	
Juno Awards	2017	Album of the Year	Illuminate	Nominated	
Juno Awards	2017	Pop Album of the Year	Illuminate	Nominated	
Juno Awards	2017	Single of the Year	"Treat You Better"	Nominated	
Juno Awards	2018	Fan Choice Award	Himself	Won	
Juno Awards	2018	Single of the Year	"There's Nothing Holdin' Me Back"	Won	
Juno Awards	2019	Fan Choice Award	Himself	Nominated	
Juno Awards	2019	Artist of the Year	Himself	Won	
Juno Awards	2019	Songwriter of the Year	Himself	Won	
Juno Awards	2019	Album of the Year	Shawn Mendes	Won	
Juno Awards	2019	Pop Album of the Year	Shawn Mendes	Won	
Juno Awards	2019	Single of the Year	"In My Blood"	Won	
Juno Awards	2020	Single of the Year	"Señorita" (with Camila Cabello)	Won	
Juno Awards	2020	Artist of the Year	Himself	Won	
Juno Awards	2020	Fan Choice Award	Himself	Nominated	
Juno Awards	2021	Fan Choice Award	Himself	Won	
Juno Awards	2022	International Achievement Award	Himself	Won	
Juno Awards	2022	Fan Choice Award	Himself	Won	
Juno Awards	2022	Artist of the Year	Himself	Nominated	
Juno Awards	2022	Pop Album of the Year	Wonder	Nominated	
Juno Awards	2022	Album of the Year	Wonder	Nominated	
Latin American Music Awards	2022	Favorite Crossover Artist	Himself	Nominated	
Lo Nuestro Awards	2022	Crossover Collaboration of the Year	"Kesi (Remix)" (with Camilo)	Nominated	
LOS40 Music Awards	2017	International Artist of the Year	Himself	Nominated	
LOS40 Music Awards	2017	Lo + 40 Artist Award	Himself	Nominated	
LOS40 Music Awards	2018	International Artist of the Year	Himself	Nominated	
LOS40 Music Awards	2018	International Album of the Year	Shawn Mendes	Nominated	
LOS40 Music Awards	2019	International Song of the Year	"Señorita" (with Camila Cabello)	Nominated	
LOS40 Music Awards	2021	Best International Live Act	Himself	Nominated	
Melon Music Awards	2019	Best Pop Track	"Señorita" (with Camila Cabello)	Nominated	
Melty Future Awards	2015	Prix international masculin	Himself	Nominated	
Melty Future Awards	2017	Prix International Masculin	Himself	Nominated	
Meus Prêmios Nick	2017	Favorite International Hit	"There's Nothing Holdin' Me Back"	Nominated	
Meus Prêmios Nick	2017	Favorite International Music Video	"There's Nothing Holdin' Me Back"	Nominated	
Meus Prêmios Nick	2017	Favorite International	Himself	Nominated	
Meus Prêmios Nick	2019	Favorite International Hit	"Señorita" (with Camila Cabello)	Nominated	
MTV Europe Music Awards	2015	Best New Act	Himself	Won	
MTV Europe Music Awards	2015	Best Push	Himself	Won	
MTV Europe Music Awards	2015	Best Canadian Act	Himself	Nominated	
MTV Europe Music Awards	2016	Best Male	Himself	Won	
MTV Europe Music Awards	2016	Best Pop	Himself	Nominated	
MTV Europe Music Awards	2016	Biggest Fans	Himself	Nominated	
MTV Europe Music Awards	2016	Best Canadian Act	Himself	Nominated	
MTV Europe Music Awards	2016	Worldwide Act Canada	Himself	Won	
MTV Europe Music Awards	2017	Best Artist	Himself	Won	
MTV Europe Music Awards	2017	Best Pop	Himself	Nominated	
MTV Europe Music Awards	2017	Biggest Fans	Himself	Won	
MTV Europe Music Awards	2017	Best Canadian Act	Himself	Won	
MTV Europe Music Awards	2017	Best Song	"There's Nothing Holdin' Me Back"	Won	
MTV Europe Music Awards	2018	Best Pop	Himself	Nominated	
MTV Europe Music Awards	2018	Best Live	Himself	Won	
MTV Europe Music Awards	2018	Biggest Fans	Himself	Nominated	
MTV Europe Music Awards	2018	Best Canadian Act	Himself	Won	
MTV Europe Music Awards	2019	Best Artist	Himself	Won	
MTV Europe Music Awards	2019	Best Pop	Himself	Nominated	
MTV Europe Music Awards	2019	Best Canadian Act	Himself	Nominated	
MTV Europe Music Awards	2019	Biggest Fans	Himself	Nominated	
MTV Europe Music Awards	2019	Best Song	"Señorita" (with Camila Cabello)	Nominated	
MTV Europe Music Awards	2019	Best Collaboration	"Señorita" (with Camila Cabello)	Nominated	
MTV Europe Music Awards	2021	Best Canadian Act	Himself	Nominated	
MTV Italian Music Awards	2016	Best New Artist	Himself	Nominated	
MTV Italian Music Awards	2017	Best International Male	Himself	Nominated	
MTV Millennial Awards	2019	Global Instagramer	Himself	Nominated	
MTV Millennial Awards Brazil	2019	Global Hit	"Lost in Japan"	Nominated	
MTV Millennial Awards Brazil	2021	International Collaboration	"Monster" (with Justin Bieber)	Won	
MTV Movie & TV Awards	2021	Best Music Documentary	Shawn Mendes: In Wonder	Nominated	
MTV Video Music Awards	2017	Best Pop Video	"Treat You Better"	Nominated	
MTV Video Music Awards	2017	Song of the Summer	"There's Nothing Holdin' Me Back"	Nominated	
MTV Video Music Awards	2018	Best Pop	"In My Blood"	Nominated	
MTV Video Music Awards	2018	Best Cinematography	"In My Blood"	Nominated	
MTV Video Music Awards	2018	Best Direction	"In My Blood"	Nominated	
MTV Video Music Awards	2019	Artist of the Year	Himself	Nominated	
MTV Video Music Awards	2019	Best Collaboration	"Señorita" (with Camila Cabello)	Won	
MTV Video Music Awards	2019	Best Cinematography	"Señorita" (with Camila Cabello)	Won	
MTV Video Music Awards	2019	Best Art Direction	"Señorita" (with Camila Cabello)	Nominated	
MTV Video Music Awards	2019	Best Choreography	"Señorita" (with Camila Cabello)	Nominated	
MTV Video Music Awards	2019	Song of Summer	"Señorita" (with Camila Cabello)	Nominated	
MTV Video Music Awards	2021	Song of Summer	"Summer of Love" (with Tainy)	Nominated	
MTV Video Music Awards	2021	Best Pop	"Wonder"	Nominated	
MTV Video Music Awards Japan	2017	Best New Artist Video (International)	"Treat You Better"	Won	
MTV Video Music Awards Japan	2018	Best Male Video (International)	"In My Blood"	Won	
MTV Video Music Awards Japan	2018	Video of the Year	"In My Blood"	Nominated	
MTV Video Play Awards	2016	Winning Video	"Stitches"	Won	
MTV Video Play Awards	2019	Winning Video	"Señorita" (with Camila Cabello)	Won	
Myx Music Awards	2020	Favorite International Video	"Señorita" (with Camila Cabello)	Nominated	
Nickelodeon Kids' Choice Awards	2016	Favorite New Artist	Himself	Won	
Nickelodeon Kids' Choice Awards	2017	Favorite Male Singer	Himself	Won	
Nickelodeon Kids' Choice Awards	2018	Favorite Male Singer	Himself	Won	
Nickelodeon Kids' Choice Awards	2019	Favorite Male Singer	Himself	Won	
Nickelodeon Kids' Choice Awards	2019	Favorite Song	"In My Blood"	Nominated	
Nickelodeon Kids' Choice Awards	2020	Favorite Music Collaboration	"Señorita" (with Camila Cabello)	Won	
Nickelodeon Kids' Choice Awards	2020	Favorite Male Artist	Himself	Won	
Nickelodeon Kids' Choice Awards	2021	Favorite Male Artist	Himself	Nominated	
Nickelodeon Kids' Choice Awards	2021	Favourite Song	"Wonder"	Nominated	
Nickelodeon Kids' Choice Awards	2022	Favorite Male Artist	Himself	Nominated	
Nickelodeon Kids’ Choice Awards Abu Dhabi	2019	Favorite International Star	Himself	Nominated	
Nickelodeon Argentina Kids' Choice Awards	2017	Favorite International Artist or Group	Himself	Nominated	
Nickelodeon Mexico Kids' Choice Awards	2018	Favorite International Artist or Group	Himself	Nominated	
Nickelodeon Mexico Kids' Choice Awards	2019	Favorite Hit	"If I Can't Have You"	Nominated	
Nickelodeon Mexico Kids' Choice Awards	2022	Favorite Hit	"When You're Gone"	Nominated	
Nickelodeon Mexico Kids' Choice Awards	2022	Favorite Global Artist	Himself	Nominated	
NRJ Music Awards	2017	Révélation Internationale de l’année	Himself	Nominated	
NRJ Music Awards	2018	Artiste Masculin International de l'Année	Himself	Nominated	
NRJ Music Awards	2018	Awards d'honneur	Himself	Won	
NRJ Music Awards	2019	Artiste Masculin International de l'Année	Himself	Nominated	
NRJ Music Awards	2019	Groupe / Duo International de l'Année	Himself and Camila Cabello	Nominated	
NRJ Music Awards	2019	Chanson Internationale de l'Année	"Señorita" (with Camila Cabello)	Won	
NRJ Music Awards	2020	Artiste Masculin International de l'Année	Himself	Nominated	
NRJ Music Awards	2021	Artiste Masculin International de l'Année	Himself	Nominated	
Official Charts Company	2016	Official Number 1 Single Award	"Stitches"	Won	
Official Charts Company	2019	Official Number 1 Single Award	"Señorita" (with Camila Cabello)	Won	
PLAY - Portuguese Music Awards	2019	Best International Song	"In My Blood"	Nominated	
Polaris Music Prize	2019	Polaris Music Prize	Shawn Mendes	Longlisted	
Pollstar Awards	2018	Best New Headliner	Himself	Nominated	
Pollstar Awards	2020	Best Pop Tour	Shawn Mendes: The Tour	Nominated	
Premios Juventud	2016	Favorite Hit	"I Know What You Did Last Summer" (with Camila Cabello)	Nominated	
Premios Juventud	2020	Together They Fire Up My Feed (Couple or friends that appear on each other's feeds)	Himself and Camila Cabello	Nominated	
Radio Disney Music Awards	2015	Best New Artist	Himself	Nominated	
Radio Disney Music Awards	2016	Best Male Artist	Himself	Nominated	
Radio Disney Music Awards	2016	Song of the Year	"Stitches"	Nominated	
Radio Disney Music Awards	2016	Best Breakup Song	"Stitches"	Nominated	
Radio Disney Music Awards	2017	Best Male Artist	Himself	Nominated	
Radio Disney Music Awards	2017	Fiercest Fans	Himself	Nominated	
Radio Disney Music Awards	2017	Song of the Year	"Treat You Better"	Won	
Radio Disney Music Awards	2018	Best Artist	Himself	Won	
Radio Disney Music Awards	2018	Fiercest Fans	Himself	Nominated	
Radio Disney Music Awards	2018	Song of the Year	"There's Nothing Holdin' Me Back"	Nominated	
Rockbjörnen	2018	Foreign Song of the Year	"In My Blood"	Won	
Rockbjörnen	2019	Foreign Song of the Year	"If I Can't Have You"	Nominated	
Rockbjörnen	2019	Concert of the Year	Himself	Nominated	
RTHK International Pop Poll Awards	2019	Top Ten International Gold Songs	"In My Blood"	Won	
RTHK International Pop Poll Awards	2020	Top Ten International Gold Songs	"Señorita" (with Camila Cabello)	Won	
RTHK International Pop Poll Awards	2020	Top Male Artist	Himself	Silver	
Shorty Awards	2015	Vine Musician	Himself	Won	
SOCAN Awards	2015	Breakout Artist	Himself	Won	
SOCAN Awards	2016	Pop/Rock Music Awards	"Something Big"	Won	
SOCAN Awards	2016	Classic Music Awards	"Something Big"	Won	
SOCAN Awards	2017	Pop Music Awards	"Treat You Better"	Won	
SOCAN Awards	2017	No. 1 Song Award	"Something Big"	Won	
SOCAN Awards	2017	No. 1 Song Award	"A Little Too Much"	Won	
SOCAN Awards	2017	No. 1 Song Award	"I Know What You Did Last Summer"	Won	
SOCAN Awards	2017	No. 1 Song Award	"Mercy"	Won	
SOCAN Awards	2017	No. 1 Song Award	"Treat You Better"	Won	
SOCAN Awards	2017	No. 1 Song Award	"There's Nothing Holdin' Me Back"	Won	
SOCAN Awards	2018	Songwriter of the Year	Himself	Won	
SOCAN Awards	2018	Pop Music Awards	"Mercy"	Won	
SOCAN Awards	2018	Pop Music Awards	"There's Nothing Holdin' Me Back"	Won	
SOCAN Awards	2020	Songwriter of the Year - Performer	Himself	Won	
SOCAN Awards	2020	International Achievement Award	Himself	Won	
SOCAN Awards	2020	International Song Award	"Señorita"	Won	
SOCAN Awards	2020	Pop Music Awards	"Señorita"	Won	
SOCAN Awards	2020	Pop Music Awards	"If I Can't Have You"	Won	
SOCAN Awards	2021	Pop Music Awards	"Wonder"	Won	
SOCAN Awards	2021	Pop Music Awards	"Monster"	Won	
Spotify Awards (Note: The Spotify Awards were announced in November 2019 with its inaugural show held in March 2020 in Mexico City, the platform's biggest single market. Nominees and winners across more than 50 categories, including Artist of the Year and Emerging Artist, are based on sales, streaming and user-engagement data.)	2020	Canción de los lunes	"In My Blood"	Nominated	
Streamy Awards	2015	Breakthrough Artist	Himself	Won	
Teen Choice Awards	2014	Choice Viner	Himself	Nominated	
Teen Choice Awards	2014	Choice Web Star: Male	Himself	Nominated	
Teen Choice Awards	2014	Choice Web Star: Music	Himself	Won	
Teen Choice Awards	2015	Choice Web Star: Music	Himself	Won	
Teen Choice Awards	2015	Choice Male Artist	Himself	Nominated	
Teen Choice Awards	2015	Choice Summer Music Star: Male	Himself	Nominated	
Teen Choice Awards	2015	Choice Song: Male Artist	"Stitches"	Nominated	
Teen Choice Awards	2015	Choice Music: TV or Movie Song	"Believe"	Nominated	
Teen Choice Awards	2016	Choice Male Artist	Himself	Nominated	
Teen Choice Awards	2016	Choice Summer Music Star: Male	Himself	Nominated	
Teen Choice Awards	2016	Choice Music: Break-Up Song	"I Know What You Did Last Summer" (with Camila Cabello)	Nominated	
Teen Choice Awards	2016	Choice Summer Tour	Shawn Mendes World Tour	Nominated	
Teen Choice Awards	2017	Choice Male Artist	Himself	Nominated	
Teen Choice Awards	2017	Choice Summer Male Artist	Himself	Won	
Teen Choice Awards	2017	Choice Male Hottie	Himself	Won	
Teen Choice Awards	2017	Choice Summer Tour	Illuminate World Tour	Nominated	
Teen Choice Awards	2018	Choice Male Artist	Himself	Nominated	
Teen Choice Awards	2018	Choice Summer Male Artist	Himself	Won	
Teen Choice Awards	2018	Choice Male Hottie	Himself	Nominated	
Teen Choice Awards	2018	Choice Pop Song	"In My Blood"	Won	
Teen Choice Awards	2019	Choice Male Artist	Himself	Won	
Teen Choice Awards	2019	Choice Summer Male Artist	Himself	Won	
Teen Choice Awards	2019	Choice Song: Male Artist	"If I Can't Have You"	Nominated	
Teen Choice Awards	2019	Choice Summer Song	"Señorita" (with Camila Cabello)	Won	
Teen Choice Awards	2019	Choice Summer Tour	Shawn Mendes: The Tour	Nominated	
Telehit Awards	2016	Male Soloist of the Year	Himself	Won	
Telehit Awards	2017	Male Soloist of the Year	Himself	Won	
Telehit Awards	2019	Male Soloist of the Year	Himself	Nominated	
Telehit Awards	2019	Best Anglo Song	"Senorita" (with Camila Cabello)	Nominated	
Telehit Awards	2019	Best Anglo Video	"Senorita" (with Camila Cabello)	Nominated	
The Lockdown Awards (Note: The Lockdown Awards presented by LiveXLive is an award focuses on performances that took place virtually or in large outdoor areas during the COVID-19 pandemic.)	2020	Digital Chemistry: Favorite Duet	"What A Wonderful World" (Note: Originally released by Louis Armstrong.) (with Camila Cabello) from One World: Together at Home	Won	
Ticketmaster Awards (Note: The Ticketmaster Awards was developed to recognize the amazing artists behind the top global tours as measured by the total number of tickets sold and fans reached. To qualify, a tour must have wrapped during the year with total global sales in excess 500,000 tickets.)	2020	Touring Milestone Award	Shawn Mendes: The Tour	Won	

== Other accolades ==
=== State and cultural honors ===
Name of country or organization, year given, and name of honor
Country or organization	Year	Honor	Ref.
Canada	2015	Canada's Walk of Fame's Allan Slaight Honour	

=== Listicles ===
Name of publisher, name of listicle, year(s) listed, and placement result
Publisher	Year	Listicle	Placement	Ref.
Billboard	2014	21 Under 21	8th	
Billboard	2015	21 Under 21	4th	
Billboard	2016	21 Under 21	2nd	
Billboard	2017	21 Under 21	1st	
Billboard	2018	21 Under 21	1st	
Forbes	2016	30 Under 30 (Music)	Placed	
Forbes	2019	Celebrity 100	98th	
Forbes	2020	Celebrity 100	39th	
iHeartRadio Canada	2019	Icons of the Decade	Placed	
Time	2014	25 Most Influential Teens	Placed	
Time	2015	30 Most Influential Teens	Placed	
Time	2016	30 Most Influential Teens	Placed	
Time	2017	30 Most Influential Teens	Placed	
Time	2018	Time 100 (under "Artists" with tribute written by John Mayer)	Placed	
Toronto Life	2018	The 50 Most Influential Torontonians	12th	
Toronto Life	2019	The 50 Most Influential Torontonians	17th	
