= Shawn Mendes =

Canadian musician (born 1998)

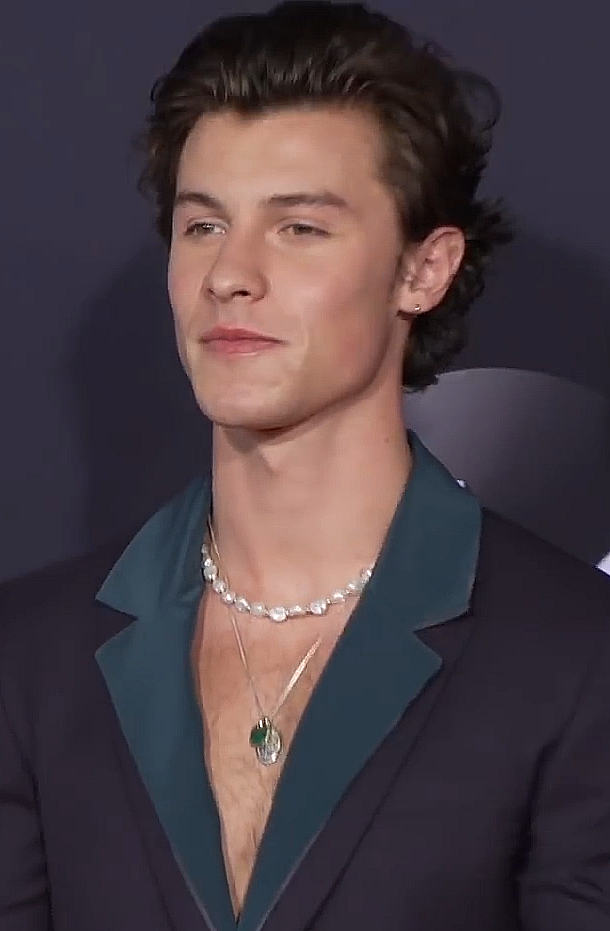
- Mendes in 2019
- Born: Shawn Peter Raul Mendes; August 8, 1998 (age 28); Toronto, Ontario, Canada
- Occupations: Singer; songwriter; musician
- Years active: 2013–present
- Works: Discography; songs; performances
- Awards: Full list
- Musical career
- Genres: Pop; folk-pop; pop rock
- Instruments: Vocals; guitar; keyboards
- Label: Island
- Website: shawnmendesofficial.com

Signature
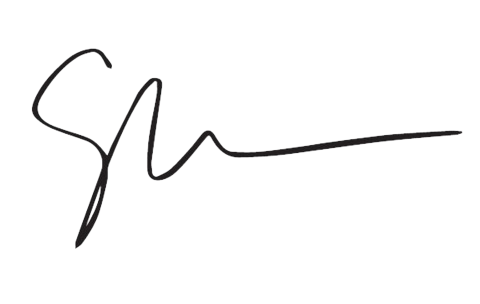

Shawn Peter Raul Mendes (/ˈmɛndɛz/ MEN-dez, European Portuguese: [ˈmẽdɨʃ]; born August 8, 1998) is a Canadian singer, songwriter, and musician. Mendes gained early recognition for posting popular song covers on the social media platforms YouTube and Vine. He later signed to Island Records and released his self-titled debut EP in 2014.

Mendes's debut studio album, Handwritten (2015), debuted atop the US Billboard 200 and featured his breakout single "Stitches", which reached number one in the UK and the top 10 in the US and Canada. His second studio album, Illuminate (2016), produced a string of successful singles, including "Treat You Better", "Mercy", and "There's Nothing Holdin' Me Back". His self-titled third studio album featured the lead single "In My Blood", while its deluxe edition included the hit singles "If I Can't Have You" and "Señorita"; the latter became his first US Billboard Hot 100 number-one single. His fourth studio album, Wonder (2020), made him the youngest male artist ever to top the Billboard 200 with four studio albums. After a brief hiatus, Mendes released his folk-driven fifth studio album, Shawn (2024).

Mendes's accolades include thirteen SOCAN awards, ten MTV Europe Music Awards, eight Juno Awards, eight iHeartRadio MMVAs, two American Music Awards, in addition to nominations for three Grammy Awards and a Brit Award. In 2018, Time named him one of the 100 most influential people in the world on their annual list.

== Early life ==
Shawn Peter Raul Mendes was born on August 8, 1998, in Toronto, to English mother Karen (née Rayment) and Portuguese father Manuel Mendes, and was raised in Pickering, Ontario. His mother is a real estate agent, while his father is a businessman from the Algarve who sells bar and restaurant supplies in Toronto. He has a younger sister named Aaliyah. He was raised in a religious family, and played youth soccer with Pickering FC. Mendes graduated from Pine Ridge Secondary School in June 2016, where he played ice hockey and soccer, joined his high school glee club, and crafted his stage presence in acting lessons (leading as Prince Charming at one point). He also auditioned for the Disney Channel in Toronto.

== Career ==
=== 2013–2015: Handwritten ===
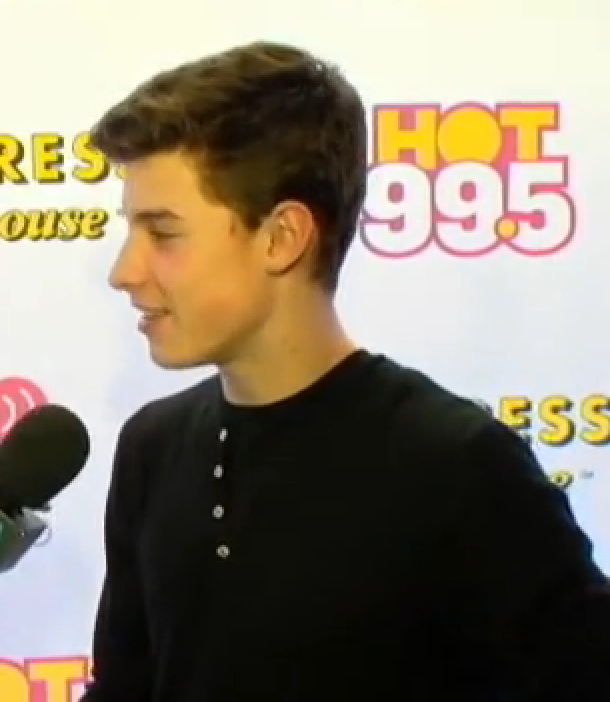
Mendes at the Jingle Ball Tour 2014

Mendes learned to play guitar by watching YouTube tutorial videos at the age of 13 in 2012. Less than a year later he started posting cover videos on YouTube. Mendes started attracting viewers after he posted a cover from Justin Bieber's "As Long as You Love Me" on the social video app Vine in 2013 and got 10,000 likes and as many followers the next day. After that he gained millions of views and followers in a few months, becoming well known for his six-second snippets of renditions of many popular songs. Mendes saw Bieber as a career model at the time. By August 2014, he was the third most-followed musician on Vine. Artist manager Andrew Gertler discovered Mendes online in November 2013, bringing him to Island Records in January 2014. In April, he won Ryan Seacrest's "Best Cover Song" contest with "Say Something" by A Great Big World. He officially signed to Island in May 2014.

He released his first single "Life of the Party" on June 26, 2014. He became the youngest to debut in the top 25 on the US Billboard Hot 100, making it to number 24 for the week ending July 12, 2014. Prior to his signing, Mendes toured as a member of the Magcon Tour alongside other young Viners with a large following on social media. Mendes was also on a nationwide tour with Austin Mahone as an opening act. He released his debut major label EP in July. The EP debuted and peaked at number five on the Billboard 200, selling 48,000 copies in its first week. He won a Teen Choice award in 2014 for Webstar in Music. On September 5, 2014, "Oh Cecilia (Breaking My Heart)" featuring Mendes was released as the fifth single from the Vamps' debut album, Meet the Vamps. On November 6, 2014, "Something Big" was released as the second single.

On April 14, 2015, Mendes released his full-length album Handwritten, which debuted at number one on the Billboard 200 chart with 119,000 equivalent album units, selling 106,000 copies in its first week and was certified platinum. Mendes then became the youngest artist to debut at number one since the release of Justin Bieber's My World 2.0. The third single from the album, "Stitches", peaked at number four on the US Billboard Hot 100, becoming his first top 10 single in the US, and became his first number one on the Adult Pop Songs and Adult Contemporary charts. The song later reached number one in the UK. Also in 2015, Mendes opened for Taylor Swift during 1989 World Tour dates for North America and recorded "Believe" for the soundtrack of Disney Channel Original Movie Descendants. In late 2015, Mendes and Camila Cabello, who was at the time a member of the group Fifth Harmony, released their collaborative single "I Know What You Did Last Summer". The song was included on Mendes's Handwritten Revisited reissue.

Mendes was listed among Time's "25 Most Influential Teens of 2014", debuting in the list after being the youngest-ever artist to debut in the top 25 of Billboard Hot 100. He was listed in Time's "The 30 Most Influential Teens of 2015", making the list after his debut album topped the Billboard 200 and his single "Stitches" made the top 10 in the US and other countries.

=== 2016–2017: Illuminate ===
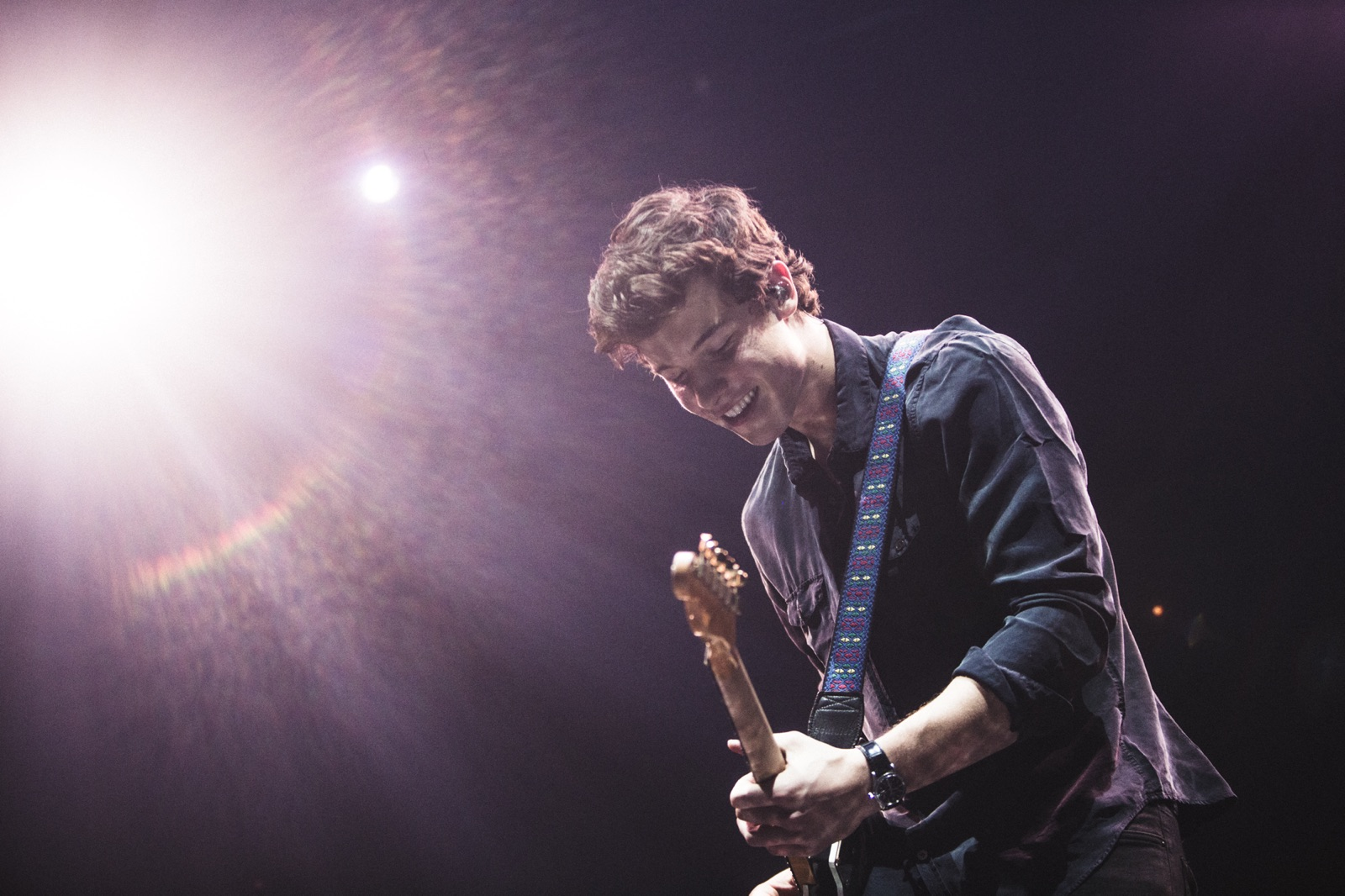
Mendes in 2017

On January 21, 2016, Mendes made his acting debut on The CW's The 100 third-season premiere. He later announced his second world tour as a headliner, the Shawn Mendes World Tour, which started in March 2016 and sold out 38 shows in North America and Europe within minutes.

Mendes released "Treat You Better", the lead single from his second studio album, in June 2016. In the US, the single reached the top 10 on the Billboard Hot 100, became his second single to peak atop both the Adult Contemporary and Adult Pop Songs chart, and was certified triple platinum. It also went top 10 in the UK. The album, Illuminate, was released on September 23, 2016, and debuted at number one on the US Billboard 200 with 145,000 equivalent album units, including 121,000 in pure album sales and was certified platinum. It debuted atop the charts in Canada, becoming his second number one album in his home country. "Mercy" was released as the second single on August 18, 2016, which entered the top 20 in the US and the UK and was certified double platinum. Mendes released the live album Live at Madison Square Garden in December 2016. He appeared as the musical guest on Saturday Night Live, December 3, 2016.

In April 2017, Mendes embarked on his Illuminate World Tour, which sold-out arenas around the world such as Los Angeles' Staples Center and London's The O2 Arena. He released the single "There's Nothing Holdin' Me Back" on April 20, 2017, included on his Illuminate deluxe edition. The song was Mendes's third single to reach the top 10 in the US and third single to reach number one on both the Adult Contemporary and Adult Pop Songs chart. In August 2017, he became the first artist under 20 years old to have three number-one songs on the Billboard Adult Pop Songs chart. In November 2017, Mendes became the first artist to have three number-one songs on the Billboard Adult Contemporary chart before turning 20 years old, an unprecedented feat since the founding of the chart more than 50 years ago.

Mendes was listed among Time's The 30 Most Influential Teens of 2016 and made his first appearance on Forbes's 30 Under 30 2016: Music. He topped Billboard's 21 Under 21 list in 2017, after his two albums topped the Billboard 200 and his single "There's Nothing Holding Me Back" became his fifth top 20 on the Billboard Hot 100.

=== 2018–2019: Shawn Mendes ===
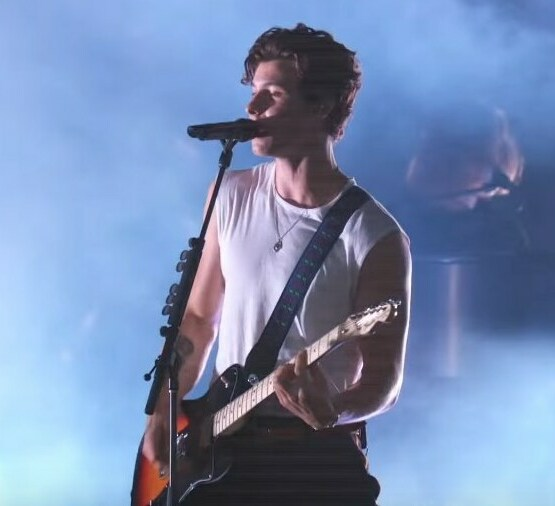
Mendes performs "In My Blood" at the 2018 MTV Video Music Awards.

On March 22, 2018, Mendes released the lead single "In My Blood" from his upcoming third studio album, followed up by the second single "Lost in Japan" on March 23. "In My Blood" topped the Billboard Adult Pop Songs chart, making Mendes the first and only artist to have four number one singles in the chart before turning 20 years old. "Youth" was released on May 3, featuring American singer Khalid. His self-titled studio album was released on May 25, 2018, to positive critical reviews, with particular praise towards his songwriting and artistic growth. It debuted at number one in Canada, making it his third number one album in his home country. It debuted at number one on the US Billboard 200, making Mendes the third-youngest artist to collect three number-one albums.

To promote the album, Mendes embarked on his self-titled world tour in 2019. Besides the tour, he performed at music festivals across Europe, North America, and South America. He performed at a televised concert honouring the 92nd birthday of Queen Elizabeth II on April 21, 2018. He made TV show appearances on The Late Late Show with James Corden in June where he sang one of his latest singles each night for a week. The tracks he performed live were "Nervous", "Lost in Japan", "Perfectly Wrong", and the duet with Julia Michaels "Like to be You". Mendes made an appearance on the late-night talk show The Tonight Show Starring Jimmy Fallon in October and performed Lost in Japan. He, together with Fallon and the show's resident band The Roots, performed a special version of "Treat You Better" for the show's Classroom Instruments series. He has also performed his latest singles on the iHeartRadio MMVAs in Canada on August 27, where he received eight nominations and won four awards.

Mendes starred in a documentary directed by YouTube star Casey Neistat. The short film is part of YouTube's Artist Spotlight Story series, featuring an interview with Mendes and backstage and behind-the-scenes footage of Mendes during one of his tours. The trailer was released on YouTube on September 22 to officially announce the upcoming documentary. The documentary, Shawn Mendes – Artist Spotlight Stories, was published on September 28. Ahead of the official release day, Mendes and Neistat held a previewing show of the film where selected fans of Mendes were invited for the event.

The remixed version of "Lost in Japan", by Russian-German DJ Zedd, was released on September 27. Mendes performed the remix version of the single during the American Music Awards of 2018 held in Los Angeles on October 9. He was joined onstage by Zedd. Mendes was listed on Billboard "21 Under 21 2018", topping the list for the second year in a row for his chart performance, having three consecutive number one albums.

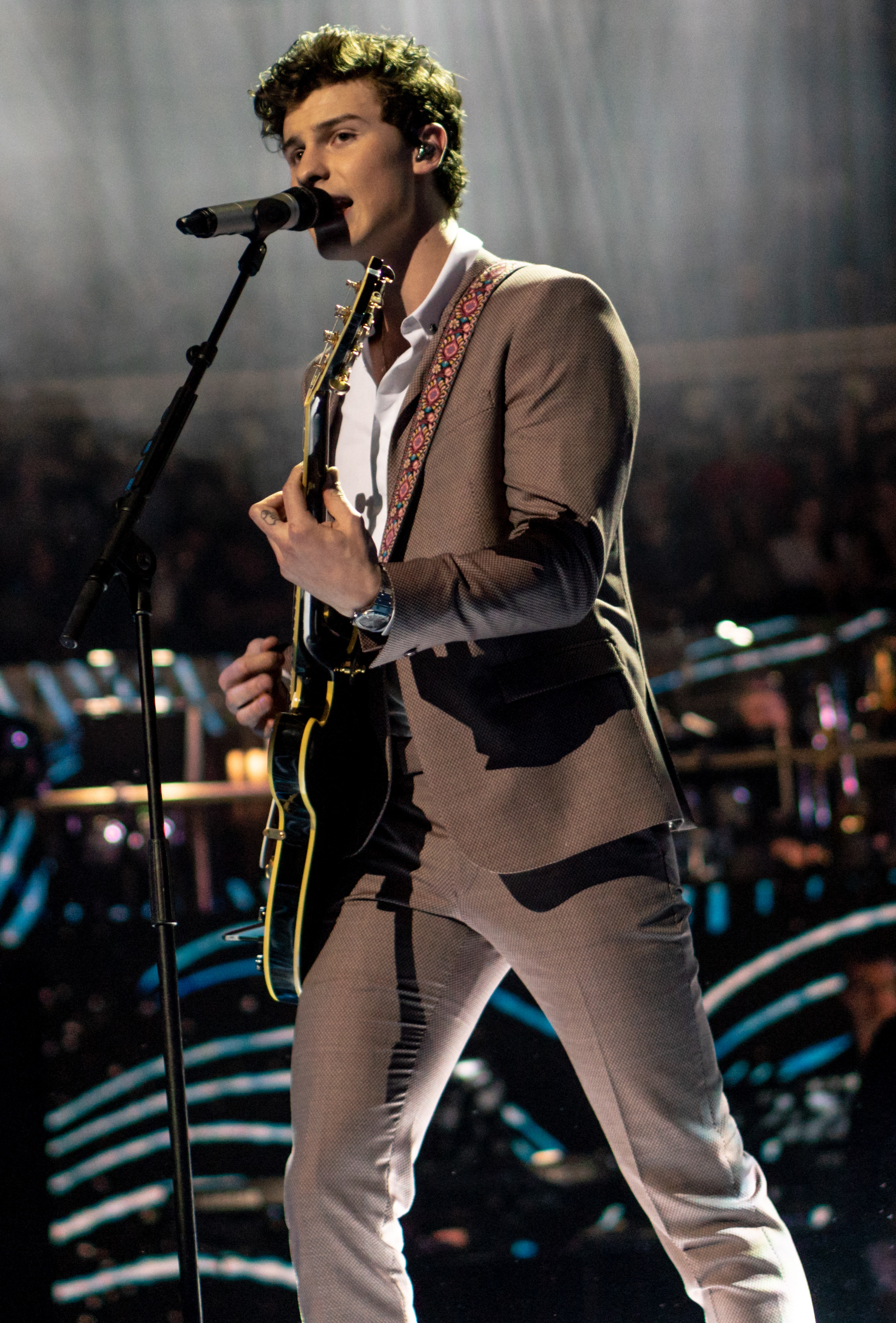
Mendes performing at the concert honouring the 92nd birthday of Elizabeth II in April 2018

Mendes and Zac Brown Band were featured in an episode of the American TV program CMT Crossroads, a show that pairs a country musician with a musician from another genre. The episode was aired on October 24 and was taped a month before the scheduled airing date. Mendes and Zac Brown Band performed nine songs, where they sang parts of each other's songs and covered Michael Jackson's "Man in the Mirror". Parts of the dialogue between Mendes and Zac Brown Band, talking about music and experiences throughout their career, were shown in between the song performances. On November 1, Mendes was announced as one of the musical performers for the 2018 Victoria's Secret Fashion Show which was recorded in New York City in November and aired in December. He released a three-song remix EP on December 21 entitled The Album (Remixes). The EP includes remixes of songs from his self-titled album such as "Where Were You in the Morning?" with Kaytranada, "Why" with Leon Bridges, and "Youth" with Jessie Reyez.

On May 3, 2019, Mendes released the single "If I Can't Have You" along with its music video. The single debuted at number two in the US Billboard Hot 100, becoming his highest-charting single on the chart. It also debuted in the top 10 in Australia and the UK, becoming his fifth top 10 single in both countries. On July 19, he released the Gryffin remix of "If I Can't Have You". On June 21, 2019, he released "Señorita" with Cuban singer Camila Cabello, along with the music video. The song debuted at number two on the US Billboard Hot 100 chart and marks Mendes and Cabello's second collaboration, following "I Know What You Did Last Summer" released in 2015. On August 26, 2019, "Señorita" peaked at number one, making it Mendes's first chart-topping single on the Hot 100. The deluxe edition of Shawn Mendes was released on July 27, 2019, and includes the songs "If I Can't Have You" and "Señorita".

=== 2020–2023: Wonder ===
On September 30, 2020, Mendes announced that his fourth studio album, Wonder, would be released on December 4, along with announcing that the album's lead single, also called "Wonder", would be released on October 2. Through promotional videos, "Intro", the first song from the album, was also released. "Wonder" debuted and peaked at number 18 on the US Billboard Hot 100. On October 13, Mendes announced that a documentary titled Shawn Mendes: In Wonder, which chronicles the past few years of his life, would be released on Netflix on November 23. A concert film, titled Shawn Mendes: Live in Concert, was released on Netflix on November 25, following his first performance at the Rogers Centre on September 6, 2019.

On November 16, 2020, Mendes announced that the second single from Wonder was a collaboration with Justin Bieber on a track entitled "Monster". The single and the music video were released on November 20, 2020. The song peaked at number eight on the US Billboard Hot 100. Mendes performed "Monster" live for the first time with Bieber at the 2020 American Music Awards; he also performed "Wonder". On December 4, the album Wonder was released, debuting at number one in the US as well as Canada. On December 6, Mendes held a concert event titled, Wonder: The Experience, where he did a Q&A session, performed songs from the album, and talked about the behind the scenes of making of the record. On December 7, Mendes did an interview alongside Matthew McConaughey and performed "Dream" for the first time on television during his appearance on The Late Late Show with James Corden.

On August 20, 2021, Mendes released "Summer of Love" with Tainy. That same month, it was announced that Mendes would serve as an executive producer – via his production banner, Permanent Content – for Legendary's TV adaptation of Square Enix's video game Life Is Strange. On September 23, 2021, Mendes announced that he would be embarking on Wonder: The World Tour, across North America, the United Kingdom, and Europe, consisting of 64 dates and starting on March 14, 2022, at the Royal Arena in Copenhagen. He performed seven shows before postponing three weeks due to his mental health before eventually canceling the remaining eighty scheduled shows. Mendes stated he would continue to make music and that he hopes to tour again. On November 30, 2021, Mendes announced that a new single, titled "It'll Be Okay", would be released on December 1. On March 20, 2022, he premiered a new song titled "When You're Gone" during his performance at SXSW 2022.

Mendes voiced the title character in Lyle, Lyle, Crocodile, the movie adaptation of the children's book series by American author Bernard Waber, lending his pipes to a crocodile who only sings and never talks. The movie was released in the United States on October 7, 2022, by Columbia Pictures. An original song written and performed by Mendes, titled "Heartbeat," was released as the promotional single for the movie's soundtrack album on September 23. On June 9, 2023, Mendes released "What the Hell Are We Dying For?" as a charity single. On November 21, "Witness Me" featuring Mendes, Stormzy, and Kirk Franklin was released as the fifth single from Jacob Collier's album Djesse Vol. 4.

=== 2024–present: Shawn ===
In March 2024, Mendes announced his first solo live performance since canceling Wonder: The World Tour. Having made surprise guest appearances performing with Ed Sheeran, Noah Kahan, and Niall Horan since his hiatus, he announced he would be headlining the Rock in Rio festival by himself on September 22. In the same post, he also announced that he was working on his fifth studio album. On July 31, he revealed the album's title, Shawn, and its release date: October 18, 2024 (later postponed to November 15). Two singles from the album, "Why Why Why" and "Isn't That Enough", were released on August 8. The third single off the record, "Nobody Knows", was released on September 12. The fourth single, "Heart of Gold", was released on November 1.

To promote Shawn, Mendes embarked on an intimate concert tour of theatre shows throughout the places he recorded the album. Its selected venues hold between 2,000 and 3,000 attendees. The concerts started in Woodstock, New York on August 8, 2024, and concluded in Puerto Rico on April 8, 2025. A concert film, titled Shawn Mendes: For Friends and Family Only (A Live Concert Film), premiered on November 14 in selected theaters.

On May 29, 2025, Mendes announced the On the Road Again Tour. The tour commenced on August 2, 2025, in Kosovo, and concluded on October 17.

== Artistry and musical influences ==
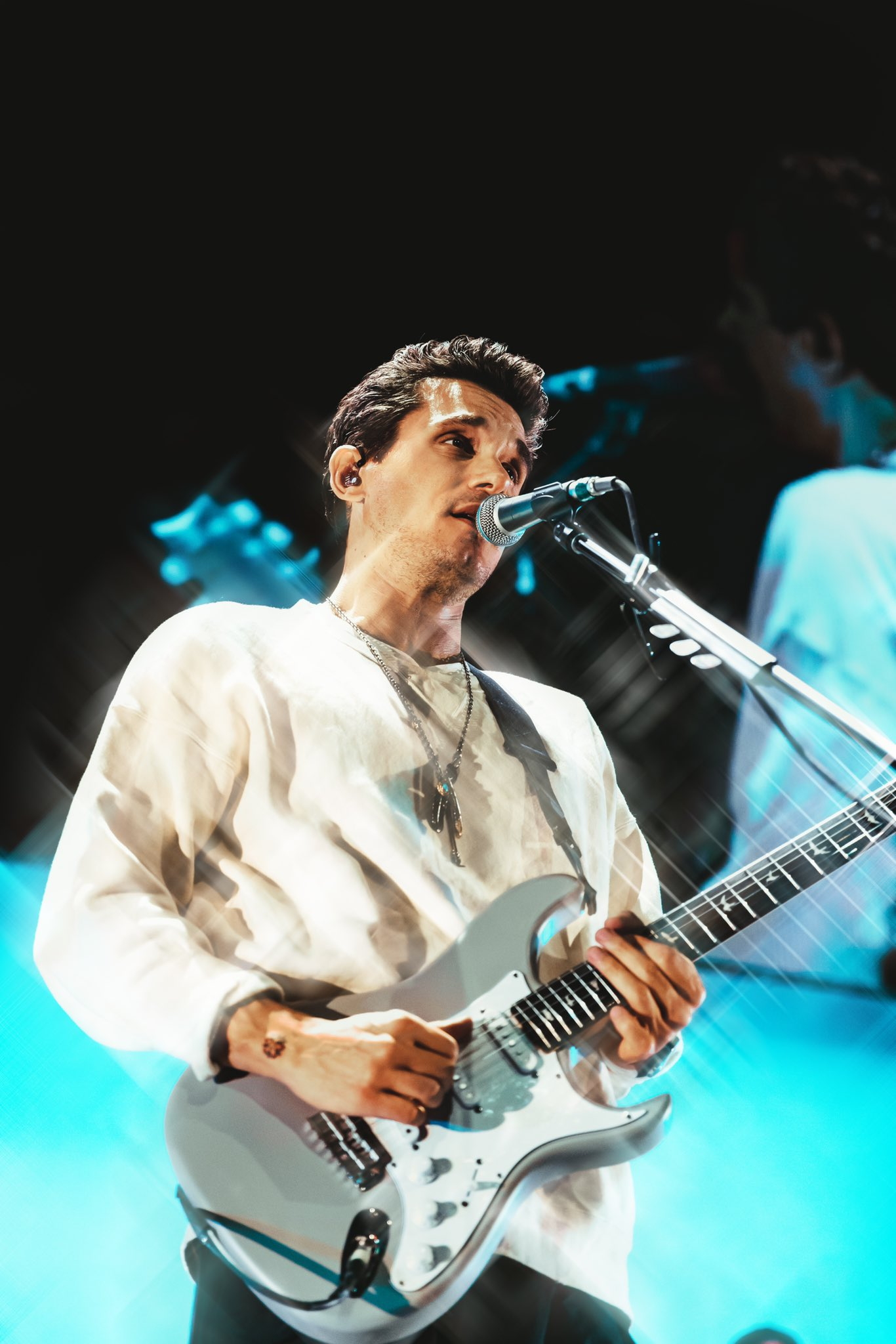
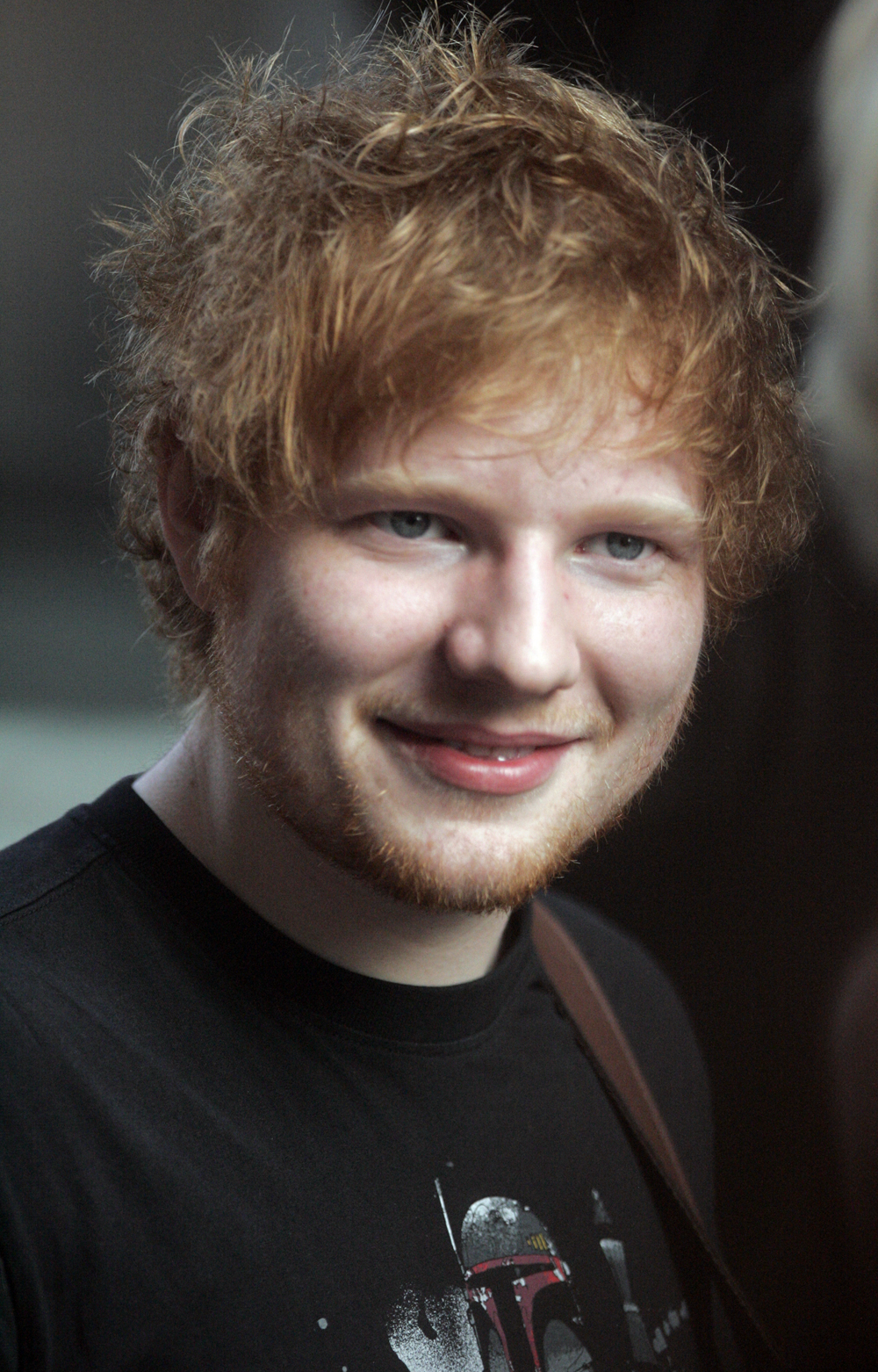
Mendes cites John Mayer and Ed Sheeran as some of his musical influences.

Mendes has mainly been described as a pop and folk-pop singer. Mendes has cited John Mayer, Ed Sheeran, Taylor Swift, Justin Timberlake, and Bruno Mars as his main musical influences. Growing up, Mendes listened to reggae music, Led Zeppelin, Aerosmith, Garth Brooks, and country music thanks to his parents. He expressed that his second studio album was influenced by Mayer's work while his third album was inspired by Timberlake, Kings of Leon, Kanye West, and Daniel Caesar. For Brittany Spanos of Rolling Stone, Mendes incorporates "catchy acoustic folk-pop tunes" in his catalogue, while for Joe Coscarelli of The New York Times, "his soft, sometimes soulful pop-rock plays primarily to tweens and teenagers, but has also found traction on adult contemporary radio stations". In an interview with Clash, Mendes stated:

"I want to create anthems for people. I want to create anthems for big moments in their lives...I don't want my music to play for a few months and then go away forever. And not only that, I want to do incredible things that make a difference too. I think it's not only about the music you release, it's about the things you do while you're making the music."

== Brand endorsement and modelling ==
Mendes signed with Wilhelmina Models in 2016.

In June 2017, Mendes walked the runway during the "Emporio Armani Spring 2018" show held in Milan, Italy. Mendes was wearing the Italian brand's new smartwatch, EA Connected, during the show. Ahead of his runway walk, the promotional video featuring Mendes was shown. In August 2017, Mendes launched his first fragrance, Shawn Mendes Signature, a fragrance for women and men. He launched his second fragrance, Shawn Signature II, also made for both men and women in August 2018.

On June 6, 2018, Mendes was announced as the ambassador for Emporio Armani's entire "Fall Winter 2018-2019" watch collection. In July 2018, photographs of Mendes wearing the new EA Connected smartwatches were published on social media.

On February 16, 2019, Mendes announced that he was the latest brand ambassador for Calvin Klein's #MyCalvins campaign. During the 61st Annual Grammy Awards, SmileDirectClub released an advertisement showcasing a campaign between the company and Mendes with some of the proceeds going to "organizations that seek to improve children's health as well as mental and emotional well-being." Later that month, Emporio Armani released a new black-and-white advertisement for its touchscreen smartwatches featuring an instrumental version of "In My Blood" with Mendes boxing.

In August 2019, Mendes announced a partnership with Canadian-based food chain Tim Hortons in which he features in a commercial and on beverage cups, followed by a partnership with Roots Canada in September. In February 2023, Mendes has been unveiled as the latest brand ambassador for America's luxury jewelry brand David Yurman, appearing alongside actress Scarlett Johansson in the brand's 2023 campaign dubbed "Nature’s Artistry", inspired by nature and art.

== Philanthropy and supported causes ==
In 2014, Mendes and DoSomething.org launched their campaign called "Notes from Shawn" where fans were encouraged to write positive notes and leave them in unexpected places. The campaign was inspired by the lyrics to his first single, "Life of the Party", and addressed low self-esteem, depression, and awareness of self-harm. They relaunched their campaign for the second year in a row in 2015, where the campaign was hashtagged online as NotesFromShawn. He partnered with BlendApp with the goal of raising up to $25,000, where $1 was raised for every signup and positive message shared on the application. The campaign was relaunched for a third year in a row in 2016.

He has also worked with Pencils of Promise, a non-profit organization that builds schools and helps raise the quality of education for developing countries, raising $25,000 to build a school in Ghana.

In September 2017, after witnessing the devastation of the earthquake in Mexico City, Mendes created the Mexico Earthquake Relief Fund in conjunction with the American Red Cross and donated $100,000 towards relief efforts.

In 2018, Mendes worked with Omaze to raise funds through donations to support the WE Schools program, a movement aiming to support youth through educational services and mentorship. Mendes encouraged his fans to help the cause while giving the donors a chance to attend his upcoming concert tour.

In September 2018, Mendes took part in the annual Global Citizen Festival held at Central Park, New York City. He performed, alongside other artists such as Janelle Monáe, John Legend, and Janet Jackson, and raised awareness regarding the importance of education and children's lack of access to education around the world, particularly young women. Ahead of the event, he took to social media to reach out to Canada's Prime Minister Justin Trudeau, thanking the Prime Minister for leading the initiative for Leave No Girl Behind, a movement whose goal is to empower girls through workshops and programs, and expressing his willingness to talk more about the project. He also encouraged his fans to support the movement. In response, the Prime Minister thanked Mendes and stated "The more people we have fighting for girls' education, the better! Let's talk."

In October 2018, Mendes, together with producer Teddy Geiger, released a cover of "Under Pressure" by the British rock band Queen and David Bowie. The single was part of a series of covers of Queen's songs, released in celebration of Queen's biopic Bohemian Rhapsody. The proceeds from the single were donated to the Mercury Phoenix Trust, an organization founded by Queen bandmembers after Freddie Mercury's death, which helps fight against HIV/AIDS. Queen's manager, Jim Beach, expressed his gratitude to Mendes and Universal Music Group for helping the cause. On October 20, 2018, Mendes performed along with other artists such as Khalid, NF, Marshmello, Meghan Trainor, and Ella Mai at The Hollywood Bowl in Los Angeles for the "We Can Survive" event. The event was organized to raise funds for Young Survival Coalition, in an effort to support young women who were diagnosed with breast cancer.

In August 2019, Mendes announced the launch of the Shawn Mendes Foundation, aiming to "inspire and empower his fans and today's youth to bring about positive change in the world and advocate for issues they care most about." On January 8, 2020, Mendes announced that both he and his Shawn Mendes Foundation would be donating an undisclosed sum of money to causes including the Australian Red Cross, the New South Wales Rural Fire Service, and South Australian Country Fire Service to help ease the strain on those impacted by the devastating fires tearing through parts of the country. In March 2020 Mendes and The Shawn Mendes Foundation donated $175,000 to support COVID-19 relief to Toronto's SickKids Foundation, the largest charitable funder of child health research, learning and care in Canada. Mendes and the Shawn Mendes Foundation announced Wonder Grants in December 2020 and have partnered with Google to award the first set of Wonder Grants to young changemakers around the world. Wonder Grants aim to support and empower young creatives launching their projects across various fields, including music, film, education, science, environment, and technology. In January 2021, American chain of fast-casual restaurants Chipotle announced its partnering with Mendes and his foundation to launch "Wonder Grants" supporting young innovators in sustainability, as well as a "Shawn Mendes Bowl" on the Chipotle app and Chipotle website for a limited time in the US and Canada. For every Shawn Mendes Bowl sold, Chipotle will donate $1 toward the foundation in support of changemakers and this marks the first time Chipotle has launched a philanthropic entrée on its menu. In June 2023, Mendes announced he collaborated with America luxury jewelry brand David Yurman and helped to design a woven hemp bracelet to benefit his foundation after previously announced as brand ambassador for the brand earlier this year. As part of the collaboration, 20% of the purchase price from the David Yurman bracelet will go to the foundation. Mendes has partnered with American subscription streaming service Disney+ as a tour sponsor for his Wonder tour by visiting children's hospitals in the US. Mendes also planned to donate one dollar per ticket sold in North America towards his foundation's "Wonder Grants" program, which he would award to one "youth changemaker" in every city the tour visited.

In March 2020, Mendes participated in iHeart Media's Living Room Concert for America, a benefit to raise awareness and funds for the COVID-19 pandemic. In March and April 2020, Mendes participated in Global Citizen Festival's Together at Home virtual concert to raise awareness and funds for the COVID-19 pandemic. Mendes has shown support for the Black Lives Matter movement. In May 2020 he, alongside Camila Cabello, joined protests in Miami for racial justice after the murder of George Floyd, and has lent his Instagram to raise the voice of Black activists.

On April 22, 2021, Mendes hosted a NASA video conference with the crew of Expedition 65 on board the International Space Station. The televised event covered a Q&A with students and children about various topics related to Earth Day, such as climate change, Earth observations, and general physics, as well as the astronauts' experience on the space station. In June 2021, Mendes, along with several other celebrities, signed an open letter to the United States Congress, urging lawmakers to pass the Equality Act. The artists, including Mendes, said of the Act that it would "protect ... the most marginalized communities".

In May 2021, Mendes joined Cabello and Bollywood actors to help fight the COVID-19 pandemic in India during its peak of cases. Mendes donated $50,000 through the organization Give India. In January 2026, Mendes performed at Mustafa the Poet's Artists for Aid benefit concert which raised $5.5 million for the Sudanese American Physicians Association and the Palestine Children's Relief Fund.

== Personal life ==
Mendes resides in downtown Toronto. He began dating American singer Camila Cabello in July 2019. Their relationship sparked controversy, as both were accused of attempting to start a relationship for publicity, but Mendes insisted it was "definitely not a publicity stunt". The couple announced their split in November 2021. Mendes briefly dated Sabrina Carpenter in early 2023. Since late 2025, Mendes has been in a relationship with Bruna Marquezine, a Brazilian model and actress.

Regarding speculations about his sexuality, in June 2016, Mendes stated: "First of all, I'm not gay. Second of all, it shouldn't make a difference if I was or if I wasn't. The focus should be on the music and not my sexuality." In late October 2024, he commented that he was "still figuring out" his sexuality.

Mendes has been open about his struggles with anxiety, which he disclosed publicly in his song "In My Blood". He said, "I spoke to a therapist a couple of times. [...] Therapy is what works for you. Therapy is listening to music and running on the treadmill, therapy is going to dinner with your friends—it's something that distracts you, that helps you heal and so it just depends on what you think therapy is. I made a conscious effort to be more connected to the people in my life. I found I was closing myself off from everybody, thinking that would help me battle it then realizing the only way I was going to battle it was completely opening up and letting people in."

== Accolades and achievements ==
Mendes has received several nominations and awards. He has won eighteen Society of Composers, Authors and Music Publishers of Canada (SOCAN) awards, twelve Juno Awards, eleven MTV Europe Music Awards (EMA), eight iHeartRadio Much Music Video Awards (MMVA), five BMI Awards, three American Music Awards, two MTV Video Music Awards, and the Allan Slaight Honour from Canada's Walk of Fame. He has been nominated for three Grammy Awards and one Brit Award.

== Filmography ==
=== Film roles ===
Film roles
Year	Title	Roles	Notes	Refs.
2013	Metegol	Young Jake (voice)	English dub; direct to video	
2020	Shawn Mendes: In Wonder	Himself	Documentary	
2020	Shawn Mendes: Live in Concert	Himself	Concert film released exclusively on Netflix	
2022	Lyle, Lyle, Crocodile	Lyle (voice)	Theatrical release	

Key
†	Denotes films that have not yet been released

=== Television roles ===
Television roles
Year	Title	Roles	Notes
2015	Yo quisiera	Himself	Episode: "Yo soy la bloguera de moda"
2016	The 100	Macallan	Episode: "Wanheda: Part 1"
2016	Saturday Night Live	Himself	Episode: "Emma Stone/Shawn Mendes"
2018	The Voice	Himself/Advisor	Season 14 of Alicia Keys' team
2018	Drop the Mic	Himself	Episode: "Odell Beckham Jr. vs. Shawn Mendes / Molly Ringwald vs. Jon Cryer"
2018	CMT Crossroads	Himself	Alongside with Zac Brown Band
2019	Saturday Night Live	Himself	Episode: "Adam Sandler/Shawn Mendes"
2022	The Tonight Show Starring Jimmy Fallon	Himself/co-host	Episode: "Shawn Mendes; Jesse Tyler Ferguson"

== Discography ==
- Handwritten (2015)
- Illuminate (2016)
- Shawn Mendes (2018)
- Wonder (2020)
- Shawn (2024)

== Tours ==
=== Headlining ===
- Shawn's First Headlines (2014–2015)
- Shawn Mendes World Tour (2016)
- Illuminate World Tour (2017)
- Shawn Mendes: The Tour (2019)
- Wonder: The World Tour (2022)
- For Friends and Family Only Tour (2024–2025)
- On the Road Again Tour (2025)

=== Co-headlining ===
- Jingle Ball Tour 2014 (with various artists) (2014)
- Jingle Ball Tour 2015 (with various artists) (2015)
- Jingle Ball Tour 2018 (with various artists) (2018)

=== Supporting ===
- Austin Mahone: Live on Tour (Austin Mahone) (2014)
- The 1989 World Tour (Taylor Swift) (2015)
