= Why Why Why (Shawn Mendes song) =

2024 single by Shawn Mendes

Single by Shawn Mendes

from the album Shawn
- B-side: "Isn't That Enough"
- Written: February 11, 2024
- Released: August 8, 2024
- Genre: Folk-pop
- Length: 2:49
- Label: Island
- Songwriters: Shawn Mendes; Eddie Benjamin; Mike Sabath; Scott Harris
- Producers: Shawn Mendes; Eddie Benjamin; Mike Sabath; Scott Harris

Shawn Mendes singles chronology
| "Witness Me" (2023) | "Why Why Why" / "Isn't That Enough" (2024) | "Nobody Knows" (2024) |

Music video
- "Why Why Why" on YouTube

"Why Why Why" is a song by the Canadian singer-songwriter Shawn Mendes from his fifth studio album, Shawn (2024). He wrote and produced the song with Eddie Benjamin, Mike Sabath, and Scott Harris. Island Records released it on August 8, 2024, as the album's lead single, alongside the B-side "Isn't That Enough". "Why Why Why" is a country-infused folk-pop song with introspective lyrics about a former relationship and Mendes' struggles with anxiety, which led him to cancel a concert tour in 2022.

Anthony Wilson and Connor Brashier directed the music video for "Why Why Why", which premiered on the same date as the single's release. It showcases Mendes singing in a barn and a river, while interspersing scenes of him performing in an empty venue. The singer included "Why Why Why" in the set list for a series of intimate concerts in the United States. Upon its release, it was met with positive reviews from music critics. Commercially, the song reached the top 30 in Mendes' native Canada, the Flanders region of Belgium, Netherlands, and Poland, as well as the top 60 in Sweden, Switzerland, the United Kingdom, and on the Billboard Global 200.

== Background and release ==
In order to protect his own mental health, Shawn Mendes announced the cancellation of his fifth concert tour, Wonder: The World Tour, in 2022. With a total of eight shows completed, it supported his fourth studio album, Wonder, released in 2020. He took a break from music for two years, although he released a charity single titled "What the Hell Are We Dying For?" the following year. In an interview, he stated that he was "looking forward" to returning to the recording studio. "Why Why Why" was written on February 11, 2024, at Bear Creek Studio in Woodinville, Washington, United States.

In 2024, Mendes started to tease his next musical era on social media. On July 31, he announced the release of his fifth album, Shawn, along with its cover artwork and release date. In a statement, he thanked his family and closest friends for helping him throughout its conception. He subsequently revealed that he would be releasing two singles from the record, "Why Why Why" and "Isn't That Enough", on August 8, 2024. The Official Charts Company revealed that "Why Why Why" would be serving as the lead single from Shawn. Island Records sent it to Italian radio airplay on that date, and released it to US contemporary hit radio five days later in company with Republic Records. Mendes performed "Why Why Why" and the entirety of Shawn at an intimate concert tour in the United States in 2024, marketed as "for friends and family only". It was included on Shawn Mendes: For Friends and Family Only (A Live Concert Film), which premiered on November 14, 2024.

== Composition ==
"Why Why Why" is a folk-pop track with touches of country music. In its vulnerable lyrics, Mendes expresses himself about his own mental health issues and struggles with anxiety that led him to cancel his tour, as well as a previous relationship. A verse of the song about Mendes imaginating a potential future as a father and a "pregnancy scare" received media coverage.

In an interview with Apple Music's Zane Lowe, Mendes opened up about the process of recording "Why Why Why". He cited that the anxiety he experienced estimulated his creativity. The singer said: "If I started to experience some pretty heavy anxiety in the studio, everyone was sure that a great song was going to be coming after it because there was some sort of healing crisis, some sort of breakthrough that was supposed to happen".

== Critical reception ==
In a positive review, Isadora Wandermurem of Clash described the song as a "refreshing shift from the singer's previous productions, highlighting his willingness to explore new sounds". The critic found "Why Why Why" and "Isn't That Enough" as "not just additions to his music catalog but a testament to his growth as an artist and as a person". She gave both songs a rating of eight out of 10. While adding "Why Why Why" to its list of the "must-hear" releases of the week, Billboard's Jason Lipshutz said that it is "highly compelling", and finds Mendes "vulnerable to the point of sounding haunted".

== Commercial performance ==
Billboard Canada reported that "Why Why Why" was the most played new radio single in the country for two consecutive weeks. In the country, it debuted at number 30 on the Canadian Hot 100, marking Mendes' seventeenth top 40 single. The song also peaked within the top 40 in Poland at number 2, the Flanders region of Belgium at number 13, the Netherlands at number 27, and Croatia at number 35. It debuted at number 58 on the Billboard Global 200. Additionally, "Why Why Why" reached number 51 in Switzerland, 59 in the United Kingdom, 60 in Sweden, 62 in Slovakia, 65 in Ireland, 76 in Germany, 84 in the United States, and 111 in Portugal.

== Music video ==
The music video for "Why Why Why" was released along with the song. It was filmed in Hudson Valley, New York, where some songs from Shawn were written and recorded. Directed by Anthony Wilson and Connor Brashier, the video features Mendes singing along and performing in a barn and a river; it also intersperses scenes of him performing in an empty venue. It sees the singer enjoying freedom, a contrast to the emotions present in the track's lyrics.

== Charts ==
=== Weekly charts ===
Weekly chart performance for "Why Why Why"
| Chart (2024–2025) | Peak position |
|---|---|
| Belgium (Ultratop 50 Flanders) | 13 |
| Canada Hot 100 (Billboard) | 30 |
| Canada CHR/Top 40 (Billboard) | 19 |
| Canada Hot AC (Billboard) | 28 |
| CIS Airplay (TopHit) | 110 |
| Croatia International Airplay (Top lista) | 35 |
| Denmark Airplay (Hitlisten) | 11 |
| Estonia Airplay (TopHit) | 189 |
| Germany (Official Airplay Charts) | 2 |
| Germany (GfK) | 76 |
| Global 200 (Billboard) | 58 |
| Ireland (IRMA) | 65 |
| Japan Hot Overseas (Billboard Japan) | 18 |
| Lithuania Airplay (TopHit) | 62 |
| Netherlands (Dutch Top 40) | 27 |
| Netherlands (Single Top 100) | 83 |
| New Zealand Hot Singles (RMNZ) | 4 |
| Poland (Polish Airplay Top 100) | 2 |
| Portugal (AFP) | 111 |
| Slovakia Airplay (ČNS IFPI) | 1 |
| Slovakia Singles Digital (ČNS IFPI) | 62 |
| Slovenia Airplay (Radiomonitor) | 9 |
| South Korea BGM (Circle) | 40 |
| South Korea Download (Circle) | 124 |
| Sweden (Sverigetopplistan) | 60 |
| Switzerland (Schweizer Hitparade) | 51 |
| UK Singles (Official Charts) | 59 |
| US Billboard Hot 100 | 84 |
| US Adult Pop Airplay (Billboard) | 22 |
| US Pop Airplay (Billboard) | 32 |

=== Monthly charts ===
Monthly chart performance for "Why Why Why"
| Chart (2024–2025) | Peak position |
|---|---|
| Lithuania Airplay (TopHit) | 71 |
| Slovakia (Rádio Top 100) | 1 |

=== Year-end charts ===
2024 year-end chart performance for "Why Why Why"
| Chart (2024) | Position |
|---|---|
| Belgium (Ultratop 50 Flanders) | 81 |
| Netherlands (Dutch Top 40) | 97 |
| Poland (Polish Airplay Top 100) | 49 |

2025 year-end chart performance for "Why Why Why"
| Chart (2025) | Position |
|---|---|
| Belgium (Ultratop 50 Flanders) | 63 |

== Certifications ==
Certifications for "Why Why Why"
| Region | Certification | Certified units/sales |
|---|---|---|
| Brazil (Pro-Música Brasil) | 2× Platinum | 80,000^{‡} |
^{‡} Sales+streaming figures based on certification alone.

== Release history ==
Release history for "Why Why Why"
| Region | Date | Format | Label | Ref. |
|---|---|---|---|---|
| Italy | August 8, 2024 | Radio airplay | Island | |
| United States | August 13, 2024 | Contemporary hit radio | Island; Republic | |
| United Kingdom | December 6, 2024 | 7-inch vinyl | Island; Republic | |
| United States | January 22, 2025 | 7-inch vinyl | Island; Republic | |
