= On the Road Again Tour (Shawn Mendes) =

2025 concert tour by Shawn Mendes

- Tour by Shawn Mendes
- Promotional poster
- Location: Europe; North America
- Start date: August 2, 2025
- End date: October 17, 2025
- No. of shows: 20
- Supporting acts: Eddie Benjamin; Maro; Lubiana

Shawn Mendes concert chronology
- For Friends and Family Only Tour (2024–2025); On the Road Again Tour (2025)

On The Road Again Tour was the seventh concert tour by Canadian singer-songwriter Shawn Mendes. It commenced on August 2, 2025, in Pristina, Kosovo, and concluded in Los Angeles on October 17, 2025, in Los Angeles, California.

== Announcements ==
Mendes announced the tour on May 29, 2025, with 20 shows across Europe and North America spanning from August through October 2025 celebrating ten years since his debut album Handrwitten (2015). Eddie Benjamin, Maro and Lubiana were announced to be supporting Mendes throughout various shows on the tour. Tickets went on sale on June 6, 2025, with various presales running from June 4 to 5.

== Tour dates ==
List of 2025 concerts
Date (2025)	City	Country	Venue	Supporting acts
August 2 (Note: This concert is part of Sunny Hill Festival.)	Pristina	Kosovo	Sunny Hill Festival Park	—N/a
August 5	Kraków	Poland	Tauron Arena	Lubiana; Maro
August 7 (Note: This concert is part of Sziget Festival.)	Budapest	Hungary	Óbudai-sziget	—N/a
August 9	Skanderborg	Denmark	Smukfest	—N/a
August 12	Cologne	Germany	Lanxess Arena	Lubiana; Maro
August 14 (Note: This concert is part of Frequency Festival.)	Sankt Pölten	Austria	Green Park	—N/a
August 16	London	England	The O_{2} Arena	Lubiana; Maro
August 20	Amsterdam	Netherlands	Ziggo Dome	Lubiana; Maro
August 26	Madrid	Spain	Movistar Arena	Lubiana; Maro
August 28	Lisbon	Portugal	MEO Arena	Lubiana; Maro
August 31 (Note: This concert is part of Superbloom Festival.)	Munich	Germany	Olympiapark	—N/a
September 25	Boston	United States	TD Garden	Eddie Benjamin
September 28	Toronto	Canada	Budweiser Stage	Eddie Benjamin
October 1	Montreal	Canada	Centre Bell	Eddie Benjamin
October 3	New York City	United States	Forest Hills Stadium	Eddie Benjamin
October 8	Chicago	United States	Huntington Bank Pavilion	Eddie Benjamin
October 12	Vancouver	Canada	Rogers Arena	Eddie Benjamin
October 14	San Francisco	United States	Frost Amphitheater	Eddie Benjamin
October 17	Los Angeles	United States	Hollywood Bowl	Eddie Benjamin
