= Shawn (album) =

2024 studio album by Shawn Mendes

- Standard cover

Studio album by Shawn Mendes
- Released: November 15, 2024
- Recorded: 2023–2024
- Genres: Folk rock; folk-pop
- Length: 30:36
- Label: Island
- Producers: Shawn Mendes; Mike Sabath; Nate Mercereau; Ethan Gruska

Shawn Mendes chronology
Wonder (2020)	Shawn (2024)

Singles from Shawn
- 1. "Why Why Why" Released: August 8, 2024; 2. "Isn't That Enough" Released: August 8, 2024; 3. "Nobody Knows" Released: September 12, 2024; 4. "Heart of Gold" Released: November 1, 2024

Shawn is the fifth studio album by Canadian singer-songwriter Shawn Mendes, released on November 15, 2024, through Island Records. Influenced by his mental health break following the cancellation of the Wonder: The World Tour in 2022, Mendes conceived Shawn as the most personal album of his career. He wrote and co-produced it along with a group of collaborators including Scott Harris, Mike Sabath, Nate Mercereau, Eddie Benjamin, and Ethan Gruska. Shawn is primarily a folk rock and folk-pop record, marking a departure from Mendes' previous pop sound. It addresses themes of self-reflection and exploration.

The lead single from the album "Why Why Why" was released alongside "Isn't That Enough" on August 8, 2024. Mendes debuted the third single, "Nobody Knows", in the first televised performance from the album at the 2024 MTV Video Music Awards. It was followed by "Heart of Gold" on November 1. Shawn was further promoted by an intimate concert tour in the United States and a concert film titled Shawn Mendes: For Friends and Family Only (A Live Concert Film), which premiered the day before the album's release.

== Background and conception ==
In order to focus on his mental health, Shawn Mendes cancelled his fifth concert tour, Wonder: The World Tour, in 2022. The tour, which contained seven officialized shows, supported his fourth studio album, Wonder, released on December 4, 2020. Mendes later would explain that he "had absolutely no idea who [he] was", and could not "step into a studio without falling into complete panic". In an interview with The Wall Street Journal, he opened up about this topic: "It has become clear that I need to take the time I've never taken personally, to ground myself and come back stronger". Following his one-year break, Mendes returned to the studio to record "What the Hell Are We Dying For?", a song about climate crisis.

In March 2024, Mendes teased a snippet of a then-unreleased song titled "Nobody Knows" via social media, with a video of a guitar solo without vocals. Two months after, the singer confirmed that his next album was "coming soon". He returned to the stage as a special guest at an Ed Sheeran concert, where they performed together "Lego House" and an acoustic rendition of "There's Nothing Holdin' Me Back". Shawn was announced on July 31, 2024, through Mendes' official social media accounts, along with its release date and the confirmation of the first two singles, "Why Why Why" and "Isn't That Enough". In a statement while announcing the album, Mendes dubbed it as his "most musically intimate and lyrically honest work to date", and praised his family and closest friends for helping him throughout its conception.

== Production ==
According to a press release, Shawn was written and recorded "over the course of two years", in various locations including Costa Rica, New York City, Washington, and Nashville. "Who I Am", written in 2023, was the first song written for the project. "The Mountain" was written in Nosara, Costa Rica, in January 2024, while "Isn't That Enough", "Heavy", and "That's the Dream" were written the same month at Clubhouse Studio in Rhinebeck, New York. The following month, "Why Why Why" and "Rollin' Right Along" were written at Bear Creek Studio in Woodinville, Washington, while "Heart of Gold", "Nobody Knows", and "That'll Be the Day" were written at Dark Horse Studios in Franklin, Tennessee. The cover of "Hallelujah" was recorded at Electric Lady Studios in New York City on May 13, 2024. Mendes co-produced the album with collaborators Scott Harris, Mike Sabath, Nate Mercereau, and Eddie Benjamin, with additional songwriting contributions from Amy Allen and Ethan Gruska.

== Composition ==
Mendes conceived Shawn as the most personal album of his career. It is a meditative album centered in self-reflection and exploration, inspired by the events following the cancellation of his tour and the end of a public relationship. Led by acoustic guitar and kick drums, its production was described as "rustic" by Billboard's Jason Lipshutz. Shawn marked a departure from the pop genre that defined Mendes' career, in order to lean toward the folk rock and folk-pop genres. Mendes named singer-songwriters Joni Mitchell and Bob Dylan as inspirations for the album. The sound was compared by Slant Magazine's Jeffrey Davies to the works of the American band the Lumineers and the Icelandic band Of Monsters and Men.

The album opens with the acoustic "Who I Am", which contains "airy" production and distant backing vocals. On the track, Mendes deals with anxiety, quarter-life crisis, mental health struggles, and the lack of knowledge of oneself. The second track is the "Why Why Why", where he continues with the mental exploration and mentions the experience of nearly becoming a father. The Americana track "That's the Dream" focuses on the duality between romanticism and reality, while remarking the dark side of ambitions. James Hall of The Daily Telegraph found "Nobody Knows" and "Isn't That Enough" similar to the 2000s ballads of English singer-songwriter Ed Sheeran and American band Bon Iver, while Robin Murray of Clash compared the latter to Neil Young's Harvest (1972). The sixth track "Heart of Gold" is a 1970s-inspired folk rock ballad written after the death of a childhood friend. Murray also compared "That'll Be the Day" to the 2001 song "New Slang" by the Shins, and called the eleventh track, "Rolling' Right Allong", "worthy" of Grand Ole Opry. The lyrical content of "The Mountain" is an attempt from Mendes to reconnect with himself, while confronting rumours about his sexuality: "You can say I like girls or boys/Whatever fits your mold". The album closes with a cover of Leonard Cohen's "Hallelujah" (1984).

== Release and promotion ==
Shawn was released on November 15, 2024, via Island Records. Its release date was initially October 18, but was reprogrammed. On the same date, the track listing was also unveiled. The singer also shared a trailer for the album featuring "Isn't That Enough", in which he can be seen at a campfire surrounded by friends playing guitar and singing the song. Two singles were released in August: the lead "Why Why Why" and "Isn't That Enough".

To promote Shawn, Mendes embarked on an intimate concert tour of theatre shows throughout the places he recorded the album. Billed as "for friends and family only", its selected venues hold between 2,000 and 3,000 attendees. The concerts started in Woodstock, New York at the Bearsville Theater on August 8, 2024, coinciding with the date of his birthday and the release of the first singles from the album, and concluded in Seattle on October 24, 2024. The set list of the shows contains the songs off Shawn "from top to bottom". Mendes performed "Nobody Knows" at the 2024 MTV Video Music Awards, which was released as the album's third single on September 12, 2024. It was followed by "Heart of Gold" on November 1.

Shawn was further supported by a concert film titled Shawn Mendes: For Friends and Family Only (A Live Concert Film), which premiered on November 14, 2024, the day before the album's release. It was filmed at the Bearsville Theatre in Woodstock, New York and features footage of Mendes explaining the inspiration behind each song on the album. A live performance of the track "The Mountain" was uploaded to Mendes' YouTube channel on November 15.

== Reception ==
Professional ratings
Aggregate scores
Source	Rating
AnyDecentMusic?	6.3/10
Metacritic	72/100
Review scores
Source	Rating
AllMusic	4.5/5 stars
Clash	8/10
Evening Standard	3/5 stars
The Guardian	3/5 stars
i	4/5 stars
The Independent	3/5 stars
The Line of Best Fit	6/10
Rolling Stone	3/5 stars
Slant Magazine	3.5/5 stars
The Telegraph	3/5 stars

Shawn received a score of 72 out of 100 on review aggregator Metacritic based on eight critics reviews, which the website categorized as "generally favorable". The site AnyDecentMusic? gave Shawn an average of 6.3 out of 10, based on six reviews and their assessment of the critical consensus.

Jeffrey Davies praised the album's sound as being the one that suits Mendes the most, and Rolling Stone's Britanny Spanos wrote that it works "for the most part". The latter criticized Mendes for being "too restless to be fully realized", and dubbed some moments on the album as forgettable and cliches. Annabel Nugent of The Independent called the album not compelling but praised Mendes' vulnerability, although wanted that the songs were "half as daring". The Line of Best Fit's Sam Franzini called the production of some songs "ridiculous" and "flat", and questioned Mendes' authenticity. However, Franzini praised his voice and found that it works well.

In a positive review, Riff Magazine's Mike DeWald said that Shawn marked "an admirable step for a still-budding talent". James Hall described the album as "brave" and "risky", although he was "unconvinced this represents a great leap forward". The Guardian's Michael Cragg praised "Why Why Why" and "Heart of Gold" for having "a stronger emotional connection" than the rest of the songs on the album. Several critics found unnecessary the cover of "Hallelujah", believing that it added little to the album or Mendes' journey.

== Commercial performance ==
Shawn debuted at number 24 on the Billboard Canadian Albums chart.

The album also debuted at number 26 on the US Billboard 200 and number 2 on the Folk Albums chart selling nearly 11,000 pure album sales. This became Mendes' first studio album to not debut at number one in Canada and the US.

== Track listing ==
Shawn track listing
No.	Title	Writer(s)	Producer(s)	Length
1.	"Who I Am"	Shawn Mendes; Nate Mercereau; Scott Harris; Jonah Shy	Mendes; Mike Sabath; Mercereau	1:40
2.	"Why Why Why"	Mendes; Sabath; Eddie Benjamin; Harris	Mendes; Sabath; Benjamin^{[a]}; Harris^{[a]}	2:49
3.	"That's the Dream"	Mendes; Sabath; Benjamin; Harris	Mendes; Sabath	2:14
4.	"Nobody Knows"	Mendes; Sabath; Benjamin; Harris	Mendes; Sabath; Benjamin^{[a]}	2:32
5.	"Isn't That Enough"	Mendes; Sabath; Mercereau; Harris; Ethan Gruska; Amy Allen	Mendes; Sabath; Mercereau^{[a]}; Harris^{[a]}	2:45
6.	"Heart of Gold"	Mendes; Sabath; Benjamin; Harris	Mendes; Sabath; Benjamin^{[a]}; Harris^{[a]}	2:52
7.	"Heavy"	Mendes; Sabath; Mercereau; Harris	Mendes; Sabath; Mercereau^{[a]}	2:34
8.	"That'll Be the Day"	Mendes; Sabath; Harris; Benjamin; Chris Thile	Mendes; Sabath; Harris^{[a]}	1:52
9.	"In Between"	Mendes; Gruska; Allen	Mendes; Gruska	1:57
10.	"The Mountain"	Mendes; Mercereau; Harris	Mendes; Sabath; Mercereau	2:56
11.	"Rollin' Right Along"	Mendes; Sabath; Benjamin; Harris	Mendes; Sabath	2:39
12.	"Hallelujah"	Leonard Cohen	Mendes; Sabath	3:46
Total length:				30:36

Note

- ^{^[a]} signifies an additional producer

== Personnel ==
Musicians

- Shawn Mendes – vocals (all tracks), guitar (tracks 1–11), clapping (2), harmonium (7, 12), keyboards (9)
- Eddie Benjamin – upright bass (tracks 1, 3, 12); background vocals, guitar (2–8, 10, 11); clapping (2), bass guitar (4, 11)
- Nate Mercereau – guitar loops (track 1); bass guitar, piano (7)
- Mike Sabath – background vocals (tracks 2–8, 10, 11), drums (2–7, 11), clapping (2); Moog bass, synthesizer, zither (10)
- Scott Harris – background vocals (tracks 2, 5), guitar (4, 6–8, 12), harmonica (5)
- Kevin Barry – lap steel guitar (tracks 2–6, 11)
- Chris Thile – mandolin (tracks 2, 8, 11)
- Jeremy Kittel – viola, violin (tracks 3, 5, 6, 10–12)
- Emily Brausa – cello (tracks 3, 5, 7, 11, 12)
- Kola Rai – additional vocals (track 6)
- Kyana Fanene – additional vocals (track 6)
- Tajahniya Sapp – additional vocals (track 6)
- Ethan Gruska – guitar, keyboards (track 9)
- Zachary Brown – cello (track 10)

Technical

- Randy Merrill – mastering
- Mike Crossey – mixing (tracks 1, 3–5, 8–12)
- Raul Lopez – mixing (tracks 2, 6)
- Andrew Maury – mixing (track 7)
- Alex Pyle – engineering
- Drew Boals – engineering assistance (track 4)
- Dani – engineering assistance (tracks 6, 7, 10–12)
- Gillian Pelkonen – engineering assistance (tracks 3, 7, 10, 11)
- Drew – engineering assistance (track 8)
- Jacob – engineering assistance (tracks 10, 11)
- Jeremy Kittel – string arrangement (tracks 3, 5, 6, 10–12)

== Charts ==
Chart performance for Shawn
Chart (2024)	Peak position
Australian Albums (ARIA)	23
Austrian Albums (Ö3 Austria)	3
Belgian Albums (Ultratop Flanders)	4
Belgian Albums (Ultratop Wallonia)	13
Canadian Albums (Billboard)	24
Dutch Albums (Album Top 100)	4
French Albums (SNEP)	32
German Albums (Offizielle Top 100)	5
Irish Albums (Official Charts)	40
Italian Albums (FIMI)	43
Lithuanian Albums (AGATA)	53
New Zealand Albums (RMNZ)	31
Norwegian Albums (VG-lista)	39
Polish Albums (ZPAV)	9
Portuguese Albums (AFP)	16
Scottish Albums (Official Charts)	12
Spanish Albums (Promusicae)	10
Swiss Albums (Schweizer Hitparade)	4
UK Albums (Official Charts)	22
US Billboard 200	26
US Americana/Folk Albums (Billboard)	2

== Release history ==
Release history for Shawn
Region	Date	Format(s)	Version	Label	Ref.
Various	November 15, 2024	Cassette; CD; vinyl LP; digital download; streaming	Standard	Island	
