= Wonder: The World Tour =

2022 concert tour by Shawn Mendes

- Continental tour by Shawn Mendes
- Location: North America
- Associated album: Wonder
- Start date: June 27, 2022
- End date: July 7, 2022
- Legs: 1
- No. of shows: 7
- Supporting act: Dermot Kennedy

Shawn Mendes concert chronology
- Shawn Mendes: The Tour (2019); Wonder: The World Tour (2022); For Friends and Family Only Tour (2024–2025)

Wonder: The World Tour was the fifth concert tour by Canadian singer-songwriter Shawn Mendes, in support of his fourth studio album Wonder (2020). The concert cycle, presented by Disney+, began in Portland on June 27, 2022, and was scheduled to end in Dublin on August 1, 2023; visiting the United States and Canada in the summer and fall of 2022, and Europe in spring and summer 2023.

On May 12, 2022, it was announced that Tommy Hilfiger would be donating one million dollars to the tour as part of Mendes' sustainability collaboration with the brand in order to mitigate and offset some of the tour's environmental impact.

On July 27, 2022, after originally postponing three weeks of shows, Mendes announced that he had cancelled the remainder of the tour due to mental health issues.

== Background and development ==
Mendes began teasing the release of a fourth studio album in the fall/autumn of 2020, with a release date being announced for December 4, 2020. On September 20, 2021, Mendes announced that he would be touring Wonder in 2022 through Europe and North America. Dates were announced on September 23, 2021, with tickets going on sale a week later.

On December 6, 2021, Mendes announced additional dates in Europe, while North American received additional dates to all shows. On January 28, 2022, Mendes announced that all European dates slated for 2022 will be delayed to 2023 due to COVID-19.

On April 4, 2022, Mendes announced additional North American dates. On July 8, only seven shows into the tour, Mendes postponed three weeks of shows due to issues with his mental health. On July 27, he cancelled the remainder of the tour dates due to the same circumstance.

== Set list ==
This set list is representative of the show on June 27, 2022, in Portland. It is not intended to represent all shows throughout the tour.

1. "Intro"
2. "Wonder"
3. "When You're Gone"
4. "There's Nothing Holdin' Me Back"
5. "Call My Friends"
6. "Señorita"
7. "Treat You Better"
8. "Monster"
9. "Mercy"
10. "Look Up at the Stars"
11. "Teach Me How to Love"
12. "Lost in Japan"
13. "Why"
14. "Stitches"
15. "Can't Imagine"
16. "Song for No One"
17. "Ruin"
18. "305"
19. "Message in a Bottle"
20. "If I Can't Have You"
21. "It'll Be Okay"

Encore

22. "In My Blood"

== Tour dates ==
List of North American concerts showing date, city, country, venue, and opening act
Date	City	Country	Venue	Opening Act
June 27, 2022	Portland	United States	Moda Center	Dermot Kennedy
June 28, 2022	Seattle	United States	Climate Pledge Arena	Dermot Kennedy
June 30, 2022	Sacramento	United States	Golden 1 Center	Dermot Kennedy
July 2, 2022	Vancouver	Canada	Rogers Arena	Dermot Kennedy
July 4, 2022	Calgary	Canada	Scotiabank Saddledome	Dermot Kennedy
July 5, 2022	Edmonton	Canada	Rogers Place	Dermot Kennedy
July 7, 2022	Winnipeg	Canada	Canada Life Centre	Dermot Kennedy

== Cancelled shows ==
Date	City	Country	Venue	Reason
July 9, 2022	Saint Paul	United States	Xcel Energy Center	Mental health issues
July 10, 2022	Omaha	United States	CHI Health Center Omaha	Mental health issues
July 12, 2022	Milwaukee	United States	Fiserv Forum	Mental health issues
July 15, 2022	Rosemont	United States	Allstate Arena	Mental health issues
July 16, 2022	St. Louis	United States	Enterprise Center	Mental health issues
July 19, 2022	Cleveland	United States	Rocket Mortgage FieldHouse	Mental health issues
July 20, 2022	Pittsburgh	United States	PPG Paints Arena	Mental health issues
July 22, 2022	Charlotte	United States	Spectrum Center	Mental health issues
July 23, 2022	Raleigh	United States	PNC Arena	Mental health issues
July 26, 2022	Philadelphia	United States	Wells Fargo Center	Mental health issues
July 27, 2022	Washington, D.C.	United States	Capital One Arena	Mental health issues
July 29, 2022	Uncasville	United States	Mohegan Sun Arena	Mental health issues
July 31, 2022	Toronto	Canada	Scotiabank Arena	Mental health issues
August 2, 2022	Toronto	Canada	Scotiabank Arena	Mental health issues
August 5, 2022	Boston	United States	TD Garden	Mental health issues
August 6, 2022	Boston	United States	TD Garden	Mental health issues
August 12, 2022	Louisville	United States	KFC Yum! Center	Mental health issues
August 15, 2022	Montreal	Canada	Bell Centre	Mental health issues
August 16, 2022	Montreal	Canada	Bell Centre	Mental health issues
August 19, 2022	Brooklyn	United States	Barclays Center	Mental health issues
August 20, 2022	Brooklyn	United States	Barclays Center	Mental health issues
September 7, 2022	Glendale	United States	Gila River Arena	Mental health issues
September 9, 2022	Los Angeles	United States	Crypto.com Arena	Mental health issues
September 10, 2022	Los Angeles	United States	Crypto.com Arena	Mental health issues
September 12, 2022	San Jose	United States	SAP Center	Mental health issues
September 15, 2022	Las Vegas	United States	T-Mobile Arena	Mental health issues
September 17, 2022	Oakland	United States	Oakland Arena	Mental health issues
September 19, 2022	San Diego	United States	Pechanga Arena	Mental health issues
September 21, 2022	Salt Lake City	United States	Vivint Arena	Mental health issues
September 24, 2022	Denver	United States	Ball Arena	Mental health issues
September 26, 2022	Kansas City	United States	T-Mobile Center	Mental health issues
September 27, 2022	Oklahoma City	United States	Paycom Center	Mental health issues
September 29, 2022	El Paso	United States	Don Haskins Center	Mental health issues
October 1, 2022	Dallas	United States	American Airlines Center	Mental health issues
October 3, 2022	Austin	United States	Moody Center	Mental health issues
October 4, 2022	Houston	United States	Toyota Center	Mental health issues
October 7, 2022	Jacksonville	United States	VyStar Veterans Memorial Arena	Mental health issues
October 8, 2022	Miami	United States	FTX Arena	Mental health issues
October 11, 2022	Tampa	United States	Amalie Arena	Mental health issues
October 12, 2022	Orlando	United States	Amway Center	Mental health issues
October 14, 2022	Atlanta	United States	State Farm Arena	Mental health issues
October 16, 2022	Charleston	United States	Credit One Stadium	Mental health issues
October 18, 2022	Columbus	United States	Schottenstein Center	Mental health issues
October 19, 2022	Nashville	United States	Bridgestone Arena	Mental health issues
October 21, 2022	Grand Rapids	United States	Van Andel Arena	Mental health issues
October 22, 2022	Detroit	United States	Little Caesars Arena	Mental health issues
October 24, 2022	Indianapolis	United States	Gainbridge Fieldhouse	Mental health issues
October 26, 2022	Newark	United States	Prudential Center	Mental health issues
May 31, 2023	Bologna	Italy	Unipol Arena	Mental health issues
June 1, 2023	Milan	Italy	Mediolanum Forum	Mental health issues
June 3, 2023	Bordeaux	France	Arkéa Arena	Mental health issues
June 5, 2023	Madrid	Spain	WiZink Center	Mental health issues
June 7, 2023	Lisbon	Portugal	Altice Arena	Mental health issues
June 9, 2023	Barcelona	Spain	Palau Sant Jordi	Mental health issues
June 11, 2023	Bilbao	Spain	Bizkaia Arena	Mental health issues
June 14, 2023	Munich	Germany	Olympiahalle	Mental health issues
June 16, 2023	Budapest	Hungary	Budapest Sports Arena	Mental health issues
June 19, 2023	Kraków	Poland	Tauron Arena	Mental health issues
June 20, 2023	Kraków	Poland	Tauron Arena	Mental health issues
June 22, 2023	Prague	Czech Republic	O_{2} Arena	Mental health issues
June 25, 2023	Vienna	Austria	Wiener Stadthalle	Mental health issues
June 27, 2023	Zürich	Switzerland	Hallenstadion	Mental health issues
June 29, 2023	Paris	France	La Défense Arena	Mental health issues
July 2, 2023	Mannheim	Germany	SAP Arena	Mental health issues
July 3, 2023	Cologne	Germany	Lanxess Arena	Mental health issues
July 5, 2023	Berlin	Germany	Mercedes-Benz Arena	Mental health issues
July 6, 2023	Hamburg	Germany	Barclays Arena	Mental health issues
July 9, 2023	Oslo	Norway	Telenor Arena	Mental health issues
July 11, 2023	Stockholm	Sweden	Avicii Arena	Mental health issues
July 13, 2023	Copenhagen	Denmark	Royal Arena	Mental health issues
July 15, 2023	Amsterdam	Netherlands	Ziggo Dome	Mental health issues
July 16, 2023	Amsterdam	Netherlands	Ziggo Dome	Mental health issues
July 18, 2023	Antwerp	Belgium	Sportpaleis	Mental health issues
July 19, 2023	Rotterdam	Netherlands	Rotterdam Ahoy	Mental health issues
July 22, 2023	London	England	The O_{2} Arena	Mental health issues
July 25, 2023	Birmingham	England	Resorts World Arena	Mental health issues
July 26, 2023	Manchester	England	AO Arena	Mental health issues
July 28, 2023	Glasgow	Scotland	OVO Hydro	Mental health issues
July 29, 2023	Sheffield	England	Sheffield Arena	Mental health issues
August 1, 2023	Dublin	Ireland	3Arena	Mental health issues
