= Heart of Gold (Shawn Mendes song) =

2024 single by Shawn Mendes

Single by Shawn Mendes

from the album Shawn
- B-side: "The Mountain"
- Written: March 18, 2024
- Released: November 1, 2024
- Genre: Soft rock
- Length: 2:51
- Label: Island
- Songwriters: Shawn Mendes; Mike Sabath; Eddie Benjamin; Scott Harris
- Producers: Shawn Mendes; Mike Sabath; Eddie Benjamin; Scott Harris

Shawn Mendes singles chronology
"Nobody Knows" (2024)	"Heart of Gold" (2024)

Music video
- "Heart of Gold" on YouTube

"Heart of Gold" is a song by Canadian singer-songwriter Shawn Mendes from his fifth studio album, Shawn (2024). He wrote and produced the song with Mike Sabath, Eddie Benjamin, and Scott Harris. It was released on November 1, 2024, as the album's fourth and final single. Written in memory of a childhood friend who died from a drug overdose, its lyrics are about losing a close person and the experience of grief. In May 2025, the single was released on vinyl with "The Mountain" as its B-side.

== Background and release ==
On July 31, 2024, Shawn Mendes announced his fifth studio album, Shawn, along with its cover artwork and release date. On the same date, the track listing of the album was revealed, with "Heart of Gold" appearing as the sixth track. He released a string of singles to support the album and performed it on an intimate concert tour that started in August 8. During a performance at Brooklyn Paramount Theater in New York City on October 18, 2024, Mendes dedicated the song to English singer Liam Payne, two days after his death.

"Heart of Gold" was written on March 18, 2024, at Dark Horse Studios in Franklin, Tennessee, US, on the same day as Shawn tracks "Nobody Knows" and "That'll Be the Day". It was released as a single on November 1, 2024, as a single from Shawn. Its release was accompanied by a music video directed by Connor Brashier and with creative direction by Anthony Wilson. It sees Mendes singing the song in front of a coloured backdrop.

== Music and lyrics ==
Mendes wrote and produced "Heart of Gold" along with Mike Sabath, Eddie Benjamin, and Scott Harris. The song is about the experience of losing a close person, and was written about a childhood friend who died from a drug overdose. On the opening lines of the song, Mendes expresses himself about the regrets of not being there when they needed: "I didn't know what you were going through / I'm sorry that I wasn't there". Although captioning a post on Instagram with "This one's for you Dejomi", Mendes dedicated the track to anyone who "has lost someone - some who has passed or someone who's alive - whichever way". Mendes stated that it also means "celebrating them and who they were and what they left in this world". Musically, it is a 1970s-inspired soft rock ballad, led by acoustic guitar.

== Track listing ==
7" Single

- Side A "Heart of Gold"
- Side B "The Mountain"

== Charts ==
=== Weekly charts ===
Weekly chart performance for "Heart of Gold"
Chart (2024–2025)	Peak position
Canada Hot 100 (Billboard)	91
Estonia Airplay (TopHit)	20
Japan Hot Overseas (Billboard Japan)	10
Lithuania Airplay (TopHit)	39
New Zealand Hot Singles (RMNZ)	8
UK Singles (Official Charts)	81

=== Monthly charts ===
Monthly chart performance for "Heart of Gold"
Chart (2024)	Position
Estonia Airplay (TopHit)	24

=== Year-end charts ===
Year-end chart performance
Chart (2025)	Position
Estonia Airplay (TopHit)	197

== Certifications ==
Certifications for "Heart of Gold"
Region	Certification	Certified units/sales
Brazil (Pro-Música Brasil)	Platinum	40,000^{‡}
^{‡} Sales+streaming figures based on certification alone.
