= It'll Be Okay =

Single by Shawn Mendes
- Released: December 1, 2021
- Length: 3:43
- Label: Island
- Songwriter(s): Shawn Mendes; Scott Harris; Mike Sabath; Eddie Benjamin
- Producer(s): Shawn Mendes; Mike Sabath

Shawn Mendes singles chronology
"Summer of Love" (2021)	"It'll Be Okay" (2021)	"When You're Gone" (2022)

Music video
- "It'll Be Okay" on YouTube

"It'll Be Okay" is a song by Canadian singer Shawn Mendes. It was released through Island Records as a single on December 1, 2021. The song was written by Mendes, Scott Harris, Mike Sabath, and Eddie Benjamin. It was produced by Mendes and Sabath and additionally produced by Benjamin and Johan Lenox. Mendes first announced "It'll Be Okay" alongside the single's cover art and a snippet on November 30, 2021, setting its release date for the following day at 7:00 P.M. EST. A lyric video was released alongside the song.

== Composition and lyrics ==
"It'll Be Okay" is a piano-heavy ballad that is set in the key of G major and has a tempo of 76–80 beats per minute. The song lyrically sees Mendes discuss a breakup. He starts off the song "over swelling, organ-like synths", singing: "Are we gonna make it? / Is this gonna hurt? / Oh, we can try to sedate it / But that never works, yeah". In the pre-chorus, Mendes expresses that he cannot live without his significant other after the split, which therefore has him assuring himself that it will all be alright soon: "I start to imagine a world where we don't collide / It's making me sick, but we'll heal and the sun will rise". In the chorus, he emotionally vents about his feelings from the breakup: "If you tell me you're leaving, I'll make it easy / It'll be okay / If we can't stop the bleeding, we don't have to fix it / We don't have to stay / I will love you either way (Ooh-ooh) / It'll be o–, be okay (Ooh-ooh)". Further on, in the second verse, he sings about what went to waste after the relationship ended: "Oh, the future we dreamed of / Is fading to black, oh / And, oh, there's nothing more painful".

== Music video ==
The music video depicts Mendes walking through the streets of Toronto at night as snow falls around him.

== Credits and personnel ==
Credits adapted from Tidal.

- Shawn Mendes – vocals, songwriting, production
- Scott Harris – songwriting
- Mike Sabath – production, songwriting, vocal production
- Eddie Benjamin – additional production, songwriting, bass
- Johan Lenox – additional production, string arrangement
- Isaiah Gage – cello
- Marta Honer – viola
- Bianca McClure – violin
- Camille Miller – violin
- Sam Kauffman-Skloff – drums
- George Seara – mixing, studio personnel
- Mike Gnocato – mixing assistance, studio personnel
- Greg Calbi – mastering, studio personnel
- Alex Pyle – recording, studio personnel
- Alisse Laymac – recording, studio personnel

== Charts ==
=== Weekly charts ===
Weekly chart performance for "It'll Be Okay"
Chart (2021–2022)	Peak position
Australia (ARIA)	53
Austria (Ö3 Austria Top 40)	35
Belgium (Ultratop 50 Wallonia)	16
Canada (Canadian Hot 100)	46
Czech Republic (Singles Digitál Top 100)	58
France (SNEP)	95
Germany (GfK)	53
Global 200 (Billboard)	49
Greece International (IFPI)	89
Iceland (Tónlistinn)	24
Ireland (IRMA)	53
Lithuania (AGATA)	84
Netherlands (Dutch Top 40)	8
Netherlands (Single Top 100)	23
New Zealand Hot Singles (RMNZ)	6
Norway (VG-lista)	5
Portugal (AFP)	45
Singapore (RIAS)	21
Slovakia (Singles Digitál Top 100)	92
South Africa (TOSAC)	88
Sweden (Sverigetopplistan)	24
Switzerland (Schweizer Hitparade)	8
UK Singles (OCC)	57
US Bubbling Under Hot 100 (Billboard)	2
Vietnam (Vietnam Hot 100)	88

=== Year-end charts ===
2022 year-end chart performance for "It'll Be Okay"
Chart (2022)	Position
Belgium (Ultratop 50 Flanders)	174
Belgium (Ultratop 50 Wallonia)	73
Netherlands (Dutch Top 40)	41
Netherlands (Single Top 100)	93
Switzerland (Schweizer Hitparade)	24

== Certifications ==
Certifications for "It'll Be Okay"
Region	Certification	Certified units/sales
Australia (ARIA)	Platinum	70,000^{‡}
Austria (IFPI Austria)	Gold	15,000^{‡}
Belgium (BRMA)	Gold	20,000^{‡}
Denmark (IFPI Danmark)	Gold	45,000^{‡}
France (SNEP)	Gold	100,000^{‡}
New Zealand (RMNZ)	Gold	15,000^{‡}
Poland (ZPAV)	Gold	25,000^{‡}
Portugal (AFP)	Gold	5,000^{‡}
Switzerland (IFPI Switzerland)	Platinum	20,000^{‡}
United Kingdom (BPI)	Silver	200,000^{‡}
^{‡} Sales+streaming figures based on certification alone.
