= When You're Gone (Shawn Mendes song) =

2022 single by Shawn Mendes

Single by Shawn Mendes
- Released: March 31, 2022
- Genre: Pop rock
- Length: 2:52
- Label: Island
- Songwriters: Shawn Mendes; Jonah Shy; Scott Harris
- Producers: Mendes; Shy

Shawn Mendes singles chronology
"It'll Be Okay" (2021)	"When You're Gone" (2022)	"What the Hell Are We Dying For?" (2023)

Music video
- "When You're Gone" on YouTube

"When You're Gone" is a song by Canadian singer Shawn Mendes. It was released as a single through Island Records on March 31, 2022. The song was produced by Mendes himself and Jonah Shy and co-produced by Scott Harris, and the three wrote it together.

== Background and promotion ==
Mendes debuted the song on March 19, 2022, performing it live for the first time at his South by Southwest (SXSW) performance in Austin, Texas. He teased the song by posting snippets of the song to the video-sharing app TikTok the week before its announcement and announced the song and its complete details two days later.

== Composition and lyrics ==
"When You're Gone" is a pop-rock song that lyrically sees Mendes singing about the end of a relationship, similar to his previous single from late 2021, "It'll Be Okay". Transitioning from the first verse to the chorus, he sings: "It's hard for me to let go of you / So I'm trying to hold on, hold on / I don't wanna know what it's like when you're gone". Further, into the chorus, he croons: "I didn't know that loving you was the happiest I've ever been / So I'm just trying to hold on". The song has also been described as "a dreamy love song with a punchy chorus".

== Critical reception ==
Before the release of "When You're Gone", Billboard's Jason Lipshutz described the song as "a rollicking pop-rock track that sounds ready for radio play" and added that it "possess[es] a weight and polish that could make them staples of Mendes' set for years to come, and hint at promising new paths for his songwriting". Khushboo Malhotra of CelebMix likewise stated that "[t]he song heralds a new musical era that appears promising and elevated while widening his aural and stylistic horizons", calling it a "heartbreakingly beautiful single".

== Music video ==
The official music video for "When You're Gone" premiered alongside the release of the song on March 31, 2022. It starts with a black-and-white resolution and sees Mendes recording the song in a studio and meeting up with fans. As the song shifts from him emotionally singing, it turns into full color when it turns into a sing-along. Three days before its release, Mendes teased the video on the video-sharing app TikTok, which saw him dancing shirtless, with the caption: "this is unusual behavior".

== Credits and personnel ==
- Shawn Mendes – vocals, songwriting, production, guitar
- Jonah Shy – production, songwriting, vocal production, keyboards, percussion, programming
- Scott Harris – additional production, songwriting, guitar
- Jared Scharff – guitar, bass
- Adam Halferty – drums
- Andrew Maury – mixing
- Joe LaPorta – mastering
- Ashley Jacobson – recording
- Robert Johnson – recording
- Jeremy Dilli – recording

== Charts ==
=== Weekly charts ===
Weekly chart performance for "When You're Gone"
Chart (2022)	Peak position
Argentina Hot 100 (Billboard)	80
Australia (ARIA)	22
Austria (Ö3 Austria Top 40)	24
Belgium (Ultratop 50 Flanders)	16
Belgium (Ultratop 50 Wallonia)	20
Canada Hot 100 (Billboard)	13
Canada AC (Billboard)	4
Canada CHR/Top 40 (Billboard)	4
Canada Hot AC (Billboard)	2
Croatia International (HRT)	6
Czech Republic Airplay (ČNS IFPI)	1
Czech Republic Singles Digital (ČNS IFPI)	30
Denmark (Tracklisten)	15
Finland (Suomen virallinen lista)	40
Germany (GfK)	37
Global 200 (Billboard)	19
Greece International (IFPI)	41
Hungary (Rádiós Top 40)	4
Hungary (Single Top 40)	30
Hungary (Stream Top 40)	25
Iceland (Tónlistinn)	28
Ireland (IRMA)	21
Lebanon (Lebanese Top 20)	13
Lithuania (AGATA)	32
Netherlands (Dutch Top 40)	17
Netherlands (Single Top 100)	45
New Zealand Hot Singles (RMNZ)	2
Norway (VG-lista)	17
Poland Airplay (ZPAV)	7
Portugal (AFP)	69
Romania Airplay (TopHit)	81
Singapore (RIAS)	12
Slovakia Airplay (ČNS IFPI)	4
Slovakia Singles Digital (ČNS IFPI)	23
South Africa Streaming (TOSAC)	49
Sweden (Sverigetopplistan)	38
Switzerland (Schweizer Hitparade)	16
UK Singles (Official Charts)	32
US Billboard Hot 100	38
US Adult Contemporary (Billboard)	12
US Adult Pop Airplay (Billboard)	9
US Pop Airplay (Billboard)	11
Vietnam (Vietnam Hot 100)	100

=== Year-end charts ===
2022 year-end chart performance for "When You're Gone"
Chart (2022)	Position
Austria (Ö3 Austria Top 40)	68
Belgium (Ultratop 50 Flanders)	60
Belgium (Ultratop 50 Wallonia)	108
Canada (Canadian Hot 100)	30
Germany (Official German Charts)	83
Hungary (Rádiós Top 40)	75
Netherlands (Dutch Top 40)	68
US Adult Contemporary (Billboard)	30
US Adult Top 40 (Billboard)	22
US Mainstream Top 40 (Billboard)	36
US Radio Songs (Billboard)	68

2023 year-end chart performance for "When You're Gone"
Chart (2023)	Position
Hungary (Rádiós Top 40)	56

== Certifications ==
Certifications for "When You're Gone"
Region	Certification	Certified units/sales
Australia (ARIA)	Platinum	70,000^{‡}
Austria (IFPI Austria)	Platinum	30,000^{‡}
Denmark (IFPI Danmark)	Platinum	90,000^{‡}
New Zealand (RMNZ)	Platinum	30,000^{‡}
Poland (ZPAV)	Gold	25,000^{‡}
Spain (Promusicae)	Gold	30,000^{‡}
Switzerland (IFPI Switzerland)	Platinum	20,000^{‡}
United Kingdom (BPI)	Silver	200,000^{‡}
^{‡} Sales+streaming figures based on certification alone.

== Release history ==
Release dates and formats for "When You're Gone"
Region	Date	Format	Label	Ref.
Various	March 31, 2022	Digital download; streaming	Island	
United States	April 4, 2022	Hot adult contemporary	Island; Republic	
United States	April 5, 2022	Contemporary hit radio	Island; Republic	
