= Nobody Knows (Shawn Mendes song) =

2024 single by Shawn Mendes

Single by Shawn Mendes

from the album Shawn
- Written: March 18, 2024
- Released: September 12, 2024
- Genre: Folk rock
- Length: 2:32
- Label: Island
- Songwriters: Shawn Mendes; Eddie Benjamin; Mike Sabath; Scott Harris
- Producers: Shawn Mendes; Mike Sabath; Eddie Benjamin

Shawn Mendes singles chronology
"Why Why Why" / "Isn't That Enough" (2024)	"Nobody Knows" (2024)	"Heart of Gold" (2024)

Music video
- "Nobody Knows" on YouTube

"Nobody Knows" is a song by Canadian singer-songwriter Shawn Mendes from his fifth studio album, Shawn (2024). He wrote and produced it along with Eddie Benjamin and Mike Sabath, while Scott Harris was also part of the composition. They debuted the song at the 2024 MTV Video Music Awards. Island Records released the song on September 12, 2024, as the third single from the album. A Connor Brashier-directed music video premiered on the same date.

== Background and release ==
After taking a two-year break from music, Shawn Mendes announced his fifth studio album, Shawn, on July 31, 2024, along with its cover artwork and release date. On the same date, the track listing of the album was revealed, with "Nobody Knows" serving as the fourth track. The song was written on March 18, 2024, at Dark Horse Studios in Franklin, Tennessee, US, on the same day as Shawn tracks "Heart of Gold" and "That'll Be the Day". Mendes teased the track title in an Instagram post on March 27. Two singles from the album were released in August 8: the lead "Why Why Why" and "Isn't That Enough". "Nobody Knows" was released as the third single by Island Records on September 12, and a music video premiered on the following day at 12 p.m. Eastern Time Zone.

== Composition ==
"Nobody Knows" is a folk rock song, with country and soul influences. According to Mendes, it was written and recorded in a "tough night", in one take. He explained: "I was dealing with some feelings, and we were having some whiskey, and we were in the studio [...] We did it once, we did it together, and we did it live. And it was just kind of this beautiful captured moment in time".

== Live performances ==
Mendes embarked on an intimate concert tour in the United States to promote Shawn, in which he performed the album's songs "from top to bottom", including "Nobody Knows". On August 27, 2024, the singer was confirmed as a performer at the 2024 edition of the MTV Video Music Awards. A day before the performance, Mendes revealed that he would be performing the then-unreleased "Nobody Knows", and shared a snippet of the song. Mendes performed the song on September 11, alongside its co-writers and co-producers Eddie Benjamin and Mike Sabath. In contrast to the other performances of the ceremony, it was pared down, with Mendes and his accompanying "closest friends" playing guitar and drums. They performed surrounded by fog and between a collection of candles, with an electric climax.

== Charts ==
Chart performance for "Nobody Knows"
Chart (2024)	Peak position
New Zealand Hot Singles (RMNZ)	22
South Korea BGM (Circle)	136
