= Joshua "J.D." Walker =

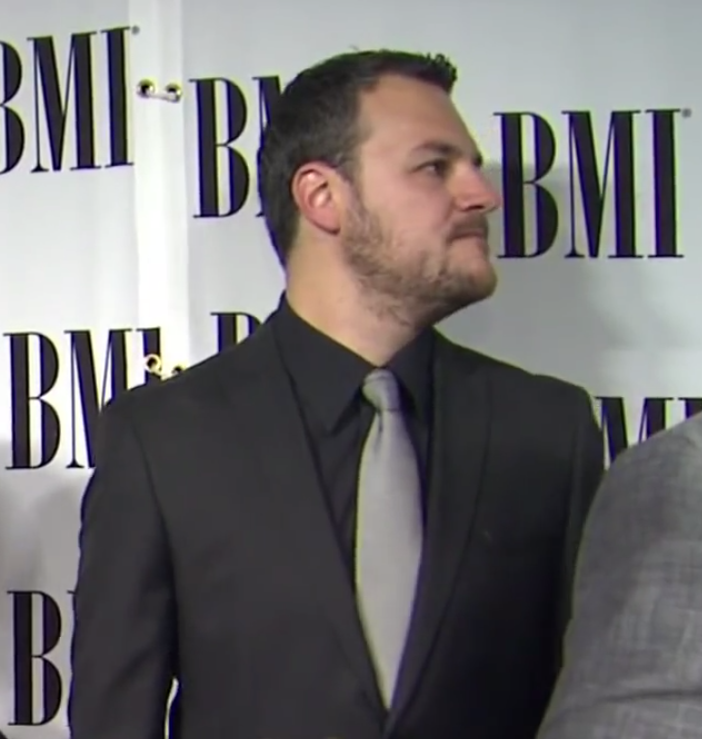
- Walker at a BMI event, 2016

Background information
- Also known as: JD Walker
- Born: Joshua Devon Walker; April 8, 1983 (age 43); Los Angeles, California, U.S.
- Origin: Beverly Hills, California, U.S.
- Genres: Pop; rock; hip-hop; dance; electronic; country; trap
- Occupations: Musician; record producer; songwriter; mixing engineer
- Instruments: Piano, keyboard, guitar, drums
- Years active: 2005–present

Joshua "J.D." Walker (born April 8, 1983) is an American songwriter, record producer, and mixing engineer based in Beverly Hills, California. Known for his work across genres such as pop, hip hop, country, trap, and electronic music, he has collaborated with artists including Cher, Kylie Minogue, Jason Derulo, Burna Boy, and Shaboozey. His productions have earned certifications such as RIAA Platinum and CRIA Platinum.

Walker began his music career in 2005, contributing to projects in pop, hip hop, and electronic music. His early work includes writing and producing for Jason Derulo's Future History (2011) and mixing for Neon Trees' "Your Surrender (Remix)" on the Prom soundtrack, which achieved RIAA Platinum status. He has since worked with international artists like Namie Amuro and Super Junior, earning RIAJ Platinum certifications.

Since 2017, in partnership with Penthouse Studios, he has focused on developing African-American country artists, including Rvshvd, Shaboozey and Willie Jones. Notable discography highlights include engineering for Burna Boy's Grammy-nominated African Giant (2019) and Ant Clemons' HAPPY 2 BE HERE (2020). In 2022, he served as an engineer and vocal producer for Nija Charles's Don’t Say I Didn’t Warn You.

His 2025 release, the "Wrangler Remix" featuring Austin Martin and Chingy, blends country with trap and hip hop. He operates out of Apex Arts Studios in North Hollywood, California, providing production, vocal production, and mixing services to independent clients. Walker continues to write and produce for more established artists, including new material for Ne-Yo.

== Discography ==
Year	Title	Artist	Album	Credit(s)	Certifications/Notes
2011	"Pick Up the Pieces"	Jason Derulo	Future History	Writer, Producer	RIAA: Gold
2011	"Your Surrender (Remix)"	Neon Trees, JD Walker	Prom: Original Motion Picture Soundtrack	Mixing, Remixer	RIAA: Platinum
2011	"La, La, La"	Auburn	Major Flavours 6	Writer, Producer	RIAA: Gold
2013	"Woman's World"	Cher	Closer to the Truth (Deluxe Edition)	Writer, Producer	RIAA: Gold, CRIA: Platinum
2013	"Pride"	Cher	Closer to the Truth (Deluxe Edition)	Writer, Producer	RIAA: Gold, CRIA: Platinum
2013	"Red"	Cher	Closer to the Truth (Deluxe Edition)	Writer, Producer	RIAA: Gold, CRIA: Platinum
2013	"Let Me Let You Go"	Namie Amuro	Feel	Writer, Producer	RIAJ: Platinum
2013	"TUXEDO"	Super Junior	Hero	Writer, Producer	RIAJ: Platinum
2013	"Barrel Of A Gun"	Rockie Fresh	Electric Highway	Writer, Producer	
2013	"Baby Just Time"	Daichi Miura	The Entertainer	Writer, Producer	RIAJ: Gold
2014	"Les Sex"	Kylie Minogue	Kiss Me Once (Special Edition)	Writer, Producer	BPI: Gold
2014	"DayDream"	Bella Thorne	Call it Whatever	Writer, Producer	Hollywood Records (Unreleased)
2015	"Real Revolution (feat. The Unknown)"	The Unknown, HiClass Weapon	Real Revolution	Writer, Producer	
2015	"Million Ways (HiClass Weapon Remix)"	Shawn Hook, HiClass Weapon	Much Dance 2015	Producer	CRIA: Platinum
2015	"Work"	Kiki Rowe	Non-album single	Producer	
2016	"Running Man - Radio Edit"	Ollie Gabriel	Running Man	Writer, Producer	BVMI: Platinum
2016	"Your Girlfriend"	Round2Crew	Your Girlfriend Thinks I'm the Shit	Writer, Producer	
2016	"California Time"	Round2Crew	Your Girlfriend Thinks I'm the Shit	Writer, Producer	
2016	"Make her Say"	Round2Crew	Your Girlfriend Thinks I'm the Shit	Writer, Producer	
2016	"MY RELIGION"	JD Walker Music	TOO FAR FROM HEAVEN	Writer, Producer	
2016	"1 TEQUILA, 2 TEQUILA, 3 TEQUILA, FLOOR"	JD Walker Music	TOO FAR FROM HEAVEN	Writer, Producer	
2016	"BASS PRO SHOPS"	JD Walker Music	TOO FAR FROM HEAVEN	Writer, Producer	
2016	"TOO FAR FROM HEAVEN"	JD Walker Music	TOO FAR FROM HEAVEN	Writer, Producer	
2016	"NEW BROKEN HOME"	JD Walker Music	TOO FAR FROM HEAVEN	Writer, Producer	
2016	"Oprah"	After Romeo	Good Things	Writer, Producer	
2016	"Shut Up"	After Romeo	Good Things	Writer, Producer	
2017	"Break the Silence (Carol of the Bells) [feat. The Unknown]"	The Unknown, HiClass Weapon	iHeart the Holidays, Vol. 2: A Very Alternative Christmas	Writer, Producer	
2017	"Colorful"	HiClass Weapon	Colorful	Writer, Producer	
2018	"18 (feat. Eighty8)"	Eighty8, SHōTA LōDI	Non-album single	Producer	
2019	"Show & Tell (feat. Future)"	Future, Burna Boy	African Giant	Writer, Engineer, Producer	RIAA: Platinum, Grammy-nominated
2020	"Pinky Promise"	Ant Clemons	HAPPY 2 BE HERE	Engineer, Producer	Grammy-nominated
2021	"Raised Up"	Rvshvd	Raised Up	Mixing	#4 Billboard Digital Songs, #1 iTunes Country Singles
2021	"Home To Me"	Rvshvd	Non-album single	Mixing	
2021	"Down For It (feat. T.I.) – JD Walker Version"	Willie Jones	Right Now	Producer	
2022	"In My Feelings"	Nija Charles	Don't Say I Didn't Warn You	Engineer, Vocal Producer	Released January 2022
2022	"On Call"	Nija Charles	Don't Say I Didn't Warn You	Engineer, Vocal Producer	Released January 2022
2022	"Cottonmouth"	Rvshvd	Cottonmouth	Engineer, Producer	
2022	"Clothes On"	Holiday State	Clothes On	Producer	
2023	"Bein' Green"	Willie Jones	Something To Dance To	Drums, Editorial, Mixing, Producer, Programmer, Engineer, Guitar	
2023	"South Real Quick"	Sam Pounds	Don't Forget Where You Came From	Producer	
2023	"Amen"	Sam Pounds	Don't Forget Where You Came From	Producer	
2023	"I Can Tell You Been Drinkin'"	Sam Pounds	Don't Forget Where You Came From	Producer	
2023	"Good Spirits"	Sam Pounds	Don't Forget Where You Came From	Producer	
2023	"Next Level"	Sam Pounds	Don't Forget Where You Came From	Producer	
2023	"Don't Forget Where You Came From"	Sam Pounds	Don't Forget Where You Came From	Producer	
2023	"Preacher's Daughter"	Sam Pounds	Don't Forget Where You Came From	Producer	
2023	"Labor Of Love"	Pia Toscano	Labor Of Love	Writer, Producer	
2023	"Leave Right Now"	The Kentucky Gentlemen	Leave Right Now	Writer, Drums, Engineer, Guitar, Instrumentation, Lyricist, Mixing, Producer, Programmer	
2023	"Language"	Alexis Munroe	Static	Writer, Engineer, Instrumentation, Lyricist, Producer, Programmer	
2023	"Let's Be a Love Song"	Willie Jones	Something To Dance To	Writer, Editorial, Lyricist, Producer, Programmer, Engineer	
2023	"Slow Cookin'"	Willie Jones	Something To Dance To	Engineer	
2024	"Adrian"	Rvshvd	It's Rvshvd	Writer, Producer	
2024	"Wrangler"	Austin Martin	Non-album single	Writer, Producer	
2024	"Forever"	Cher	Forever	Producer	
2025	"Wrangler Feat. Chingy Remix"	Austin Martin, Chingy	Non-album single	Writer, Producer	Released March 21, 2025
2025	"Burn It Up (Rubber to the Road)"	Austin Martin	Burn It Up (Rubber to the Road)	Writer, Producer	Released April 25, 2025
2025	"Bartender"	Austin Martin	Bartender	Writer, Producer	Released May 23, 2025
2025	"Wolf Of Backstreets"	Austin Martin	Wolf of Backstreets	Writer, Producer	Released September 5, 2025
2025	"All Alone"	Austin Martin	All Alone / My Ball	Writer, Producer	Released October 3, 2025
2025	"Tombstone"	Austin Martin	Tombstone	Writer, Producer	Released November 14, 2025
2025	"Love Song"	Austin Martin	Love Song	Writer, Producer	Released December 17, 2025
2026	"Boots on the Floor"	Austin Martin	Boots on the Floor	Writer, Producer	Released February 6, 2026
2026	"Glass House"	Austin Martin	Glass House	Writer, Producer	Released March 27, 2026
2026	"Bourbon & Bullseyes"	Austin Martin	Bourbon & Bullseyes	Writer, Producer	Released June 12, 2026
