= Electric Highway =

Mixtape by Rockie Fresh
- Released: January 21, 2013
- Recorded: 2012–2013
- Genre: Hip hop
- Label: Maybach Music Group
- Producer: Quincey Tones; Jo Caleb; Lifted; The Gift; Lunice; Boi-1da; The Maven Boys; Big Jerm and Sayez for ID Labs; Joshua "J.D." Walker; D Rich; LPpeezy; Ayo the Producer

Rockie Fresh chronology
Driving 88 (2012)	Electric Highway (2013)	The Birthday Tape (2013)

Electric Highway is the fifth mixtape by American rapper Rockie Fresh, it was released on January 21, 2013. The mixtape features guest appearances from Lunice, Rick Ross, Nipsey Hussle, Sasha Go Hard and Currensy. The mixtape is hosted by DJ Ill Will.

== Background ==
Aside from a handful of appearances on Rick Ross’ mixtape The Black Bar Mitzvah, Rockie Fresh was relatively quiet after signing with MMG. With Driving 88 release the Chicago rapper took this time to season his abilities, and Electric Highway was called "a clear reflection of what Rockie sets out to achieve." The mixtape has been downloaded over 250,000 times on DatPiff, that making the mixtape platinum certified.

== Music videos ==
On December 6, 2012 the music video for "Nobody" was released.

The second music video was released on January 21, 2013 for "The Warnings". It was directed by Ryan Snyder and Spiff TV.

After the release of the mixtape. The third and last music video was released on May 13, 2013, for "Life Long" featuring Rick Ross and Nipsey Hussle. Dre Films directed the video. The video also features cameos from Gunplay, Stalley and Meek Mill.

== Track listing ==
No.	Title	Producer(s)	Length
1.	"The Future"	Quincey Tones; Jo Caleb	4:34
2.	"The Lights"	Lifted	3:24
3.	"Thick Bitch (Hit My Jack)"	The Gift	3:02
4.	"Superman OG" (featuring Lunice)	Lunice	3:30
5.	"The Warnings"	The Gift	3:46
6.	"Life Long" (featuring Rick Ross & Nipsey Hussle)	Boi-1da; The Maven Boys	4:07
7.	"Hold Me Down"	Big Jerm and Sayez for ID Labs	3:00
8.	"Barrell Of A Gun"	Joshua "J.D." Walker	3:41
9.	"I'm Wit It"	D Rich	3:18
10.	"Show Me Sumthin'" (featuring Sasha Go Hard)	The Gift	3:08
11.	"Roll Up Right Now" (featuring Currensy)	The Gift	3:09
12.	"Ride Slow"	The Gift	3:47
13.	"Father Forgive 'Em"	The Gift	2:49
14.	"Nobody"	LPpeezy	4:00
15.	"Lights Glow"	The Gift	3:36
16.	"I'm Ready"	The Gift	4:27
17.	"Something Special"	Ayo the Producer	4:34
Total length:			59:12

== Release history ==
Country	Date	Format	Label
United States	January 21, 2013	Digital download	Maybach Music Group, Atlantic
