= Wonder (Shawn Mendes album) =

Studio album by Shawn Mendes
- Released: December 4, 2020
- Recorded: 2020
- Genre: Pop
- Length: 39:58
- Label: Island
- Producers: Kid Harpoon; Nate Mercereau; Shawn Mendes; Scott Harris; Frank Dukes; John Ryan; Ricky Reed

Shawn Mendes chronology
Shawn Mendes (2018)	Wonder (2020)	Shawn (2024)

Singles from Wonder
- 1. "Wonder" Released: October 2, 2020; 2. "Monster" Released: November 20, 2020; 3. "Call My Friends" Released: December 4, 2020

Wonder is the fourth studio album by Canadian singer Shawn Mendes, released by Island Records on December 4, 2020. Its production was handled by Mendes, Frank Dukes, Kid Harpoon and Scott Harris, among others. The album is his first since his 2018 self-titled album. It was preceded by Shawn Mendes: In Wonder, a 2020 Netflix documentary capturing Mendes' off-stage life.

Upon release, Wonder received mixed reviews from music critics, most of whom noted Mendes' vocal improvements, but were polarized over the album's production and songwriting, deeming them predictable and formulaic. Wonder debuted at number one in Canada and the United States. Three singles supported the album: "Wonder", "Monster" with Justin Bieber, and "Call My Friends", with the former two reaching the top 20 of the US Billboard Hot 100. The album's lead single, "Wonder," peaked at number 18 on the Hot 100, and reached the top ten in several other countries. The second single, "Monster," reached number eight on the US Hot 100 and topped the Canadian Hot 100. To promote the album, Mendes embarked on the Wonder World Tour, which commenced in June 2022 in Portland and was set to conclude in August 2023 in Dublin, before Mendes prematurely ended the tour in July 2022 due to mental health issues.

== Background and promotion ==
In August 2020, Shawn Mendes got the word "wonder" tattooed on his right arm, which would later turn out to be the title of the album and its lead single. On September 30, 2020, the singer took to his social media to tease towards the project with the caption "WHAT IS #WONDER". Hours later, he went on to announce the title and release dates of both lead single and album, as well as release the interlude "Intro", the first track on the album. The album pre-orders were released to streaming services on September 30.

In a statement, Mendes said of Wonder: "It really feels like a piece of me has been written down on paper and recorded into song. I tried to be as real and as honest as I've ever been. It's a world and a journey and a dream and an album I've been wanting to make for a really long time. I absolutely love it. Thank you for being by my side for so many years. I love you all so much."

To promote the album, a feature-length documentary titled Shawn Mendes: In Wonder directed by Grant Singer was released on Netflix on November 23, 2020, chronicling the past few years of Mendes' life, including his rise to fame, his 2019 self-titled world tour and the making of Wonder. Mendes executive produces the film, which was honored as a special selection at the 2020 Toronto International Film Festival.

Mendes revealed the album's tracklist through a Spotify canvas that was updated daily starting November 2, 2020. On November 13, Mendes revealed the tracklist on social media.

== Singles ==
"Wonder" was released as the title track and lead single from the album on October 2, 2020. Teasers for both the song and accompanying music video were released alongside the announcement. "Monster", a collaboration with fellow Canadian singer Justin Bieber, was released as the second single on November 20. "Call My Friends" was released as the third single alongside the album release on December 4.

== Critical reception ==
Professional ratings
Aggregate scores
Source	Rating
AnyDecentMusic?	5.9/10
Metacritic	65/100
Review scores
Source	Rating
AllMusic	4/5 stars
Clash	7/10
Entertainment Weekly	B+
The Guardian	2/5 stars
The Independent	2/5 stars
Pitchfork	5.0/10
Rolling Stone	3.5/5 stars

At Metacritic, which assigns a normalized rating out of 100 to reviews from mainstream critics, the album has an average score of 65 out of 100, which indicates "generally favorable reviews" based on 9 reviews.

Rolling Stone writer Jon Dolan defined Wonder as a compelling mixture of "youthful passion" and "coming-of-age agony", characterized its production as "grandiose" with backing choirs and dramatic drums, with sentimental lyrics inspired heavily by Camila Cabello. Vulture's Craig Jenkins found the album predictable, but praised Mendes for improving his vocals. He described it as a "headphone album, full of intriguing tones, lush textures, and unexpected twists", with "short and sweet" songs that lack the energy of his 2016 hit singles "Treat You Better" and "Mercy". Quinn Moreland of Pitchfork felt the album was "naive—and vaguely terrifying" while opining "it’s nice to see his cup overflow so bountifully, but the near-constant awe quickly grows tiresome." He also noted that Wonder is Mendes' "most musically adventurous album" but that "every song is plagued by the same problem: Production that attempts to compensate for lyrical blandness by forcibly inserting drama." He ended his review by saying that Mendes "has yet to make a statement that truly sets him apart."

Dubbing Mendes as the North American version of Ed Sheeran, The Guardian critic Alexis Petridis was favourable towards Mendes's vocal performance and the "important" teenage themes discussed on Wonder, such as anxiety and toxic masculinity, but thought that it is deficit of personality, criticizing the "least appealing" production, and formulaic ballads with "ponderous-verse-into-epic-chorus" structure. Leah Greenblatt, writing for Entertainment Weekly, asserted that the album sees Mendes "still discovering himself in real time", feeling free, expressing sexual tension and reflecting on early fame, and picked "Call My Friends", "Dream" and "Song for No One" as the best tracks. In a less favourable review, Helen Brown of The Independent wrote that Wonder chronicles "the struggles of the lonely touring musician missing his girl", and complimented the album's vintage-inspired sound, but deemed the songs unoriginal. Malvika Padin, writing for Clash, noted that the album is "ambitious" and "stocked full of emotions," but also wrote that it didn't always succeed, at times "feeling too shallow for it to be as impactful as Mendes intended it to be," but called the album worth a listen. Jon Caramanica of The New York Times complimented Mendes' "understanding [of] how to inflate his voice from whimper to peal," but felt that "his lyrics meander and stop short of true sentiment, and his rhythmic deliveries feel less cohesive" and that the record was "much less polished" in comparison to his previous two album releases. Writing for Stereogum, Chris DeVille named Wonder Mendes' "best (or at least most interesting)" album while complimenting his growth as a songwriter, although he feels that at times the record "falls victim to the same overly broad fairytale love-story clichés."

== Commercial performance ==
Wonder debuted at number one on the Canadian Album Chart for Billboard, earning the highest sales and digital song downloads and the second-highest on-demand streams for the week. It became Mendes' fourth Canadian number-one album.

Wonder debuted at number one on the US Billboard 200 with 89,000 album-equivalent units (including 54,000 pure sales), becoming Mendes' fourth consecutive US number-one album. It made Mendes the youngest male artist and second-youngest artist after Britney Spears to top the Billboard 200 with four regular studio albums. It also made him the fourth-youngest artist in history to log four number-one titles on the Billboard 200. The album's tracks earned a total of 46.92 million on-demand streams in its first week. In its second week, the album descended to number 25 on the Billboard 200 dated December 17, 2020, with 28,300 units sold. It sold 30,000 units in the week dated December 24, 2020, on the Billboard 200.

== Track listing ==
Wonder track listing
No.	Title	Writer(s)	Producer(s)	Length
1.	"Intro"	Shawn Mendes; Adam Feeney; Scott Harris; Tobias Jesso, Jr.	Mendes; Kid Harpoon; Harris^{[a]}; Nate Mercereau^{[a]}	1:02
2.	"Wonder"	Mendes; Harris; Thomas Hull; Mercereau	Mendes; Kid Harpoon; Mercereau; Harris^{[a]}	2:52
3.	"Higher"	Mendes; Harris	Mendes; Kid Harpoon; Mercereau; Harris^{[a]}; Sly^{[a]}	2:40
4.	"24 Hours"	Mendes; Harris; Hull; Mercereau	Mendes; Kid Harpoon; Harris; Mercereau^{[a]}	2:30
5.	"Teach Me How to Love"	Mendes; Harris; Hull; Mercereau	Mendes; Kid Harpoon; Mercereau; Harris^{[a]}	3:22
6.	"Call My Friends"	Mendes; Harris; John Ryan II; Hull; Mercereau	Mendes; Kid Harpoon; Ryan; Mercereau^{[a]}; Harris^{[b]}	2:51
7.	"Dream"	Mendes; Harris; Hull; Mercereau	Mendes; Kid Harpoon; Mercereau; Harris^{[a]}	3:34
8.	"Song for No One"	Mendes; Harris; Mercereau; Feeney	Mendes; Frank Dukes; Mercereau; Kid Harpoon^{[a]}; Harris^{[a]}	3:11
9.	"Monster" (with Justin Bieber)	Mendes; Bieber; Feeney; Ashton Simmonds; Mustafa Ahmed	Dukes; Matthew Tavares^{[a]}; Kaan Gunesberk^{[a]}	2:58
10.	"305"	Mendes; Harris; Hull; Mercereau	Kid Harpoon; Mercereau; Harris^{[a]}	3:09
11.	"Always Been You"	Mendes; Jesso Jr.; Harris; Zubin Thakkar	Mendes; Kid Harpoon; Mercereau; Harris^{[a]}	2:47
12.	"Piece of You"	Mendes; Harris; Ryan II; Eric Frederic	Mendes; Ricky Reed; Kid Harpoon^{[a]}; Mercereau^{[a]}; Harris^{[a]}	2:55
13.	"Look Up at the Stars"	Mendes; Harris; Hull	Mendes; Kid Harpoon; Mercereau^{[a]}; Harris^{[a]}	3:31
14.	"Can't Imagine"	Mendes	Mendes; Kid Harpoon; Mercereau^{[a]}; Harris^{[a]}	2:29
Total length:				39:58

Wonder (Holiday Deluxe) track listing
No.	Title	Writer(s)	Producer(s)	Length
15.	"The Christmas Song" (with Camila Cabello)	Robert Wells; Mel Tormé	Mercereau; Ben Darwish^{[a]}	3:16
16.	"Can't Take My Eyes Off You" (BBC Live Version)	Bob Crewe; Bob Gaudio	Thakkar	3:24
Total length:				46:48

Wonder (Deluxe) track listing
No.	Title	Writer(s)	Producer(s)	Length
17.	"Wonder" (Acoustic)	Mendes; Harris; Hull; Mercereau	Mercereau; Thakkar	2:53
18.	"Wonder" (Surf Mesa Remix)	Mendes; Harris; Hull; Mercereau	Mendes; Kid Harpoon; Mercereau; Harris^{[a]}	3:18
19.	"Intro" (Live from The Wonder Residencies)	Mendes; Harris; Feeney; Jesso Jr.	Thakkar	1:09
20.	"Wonder" (Live from The Wonder Residencies)	Mendes; Harris; Hull; Mercereau	Thakkar	2:54
21.	"Dream" (Live from The Wonder Residencies)	Mendes; Harris; Hull; Mercereau	Thakkar	3:41
22.	"Song for No One" (Live from The Wonder Residencies)	Mendes; Harris; Feeney; Mercereau	Thakkar	3:16
23.	"Always Been You" (Live from The Wonder Residencies)	Mendes; Harris; Thakkar; Jesso Jr.	Thakkar	3:32
24.	"Look Up at the Stars" (Live from The Wonder Residencies)	Mendes; Harris; Hull	Thakkar	4:16
Total length:				71:45

Notes

- ^{^[a]} signifies an additional producer
- ^{^[b]} signifies an assistant producer

== Personnel ==
Credits adapted from Tidal.

Musicians

- Shawn Mendes – vocals (all tracks), piano (1, 2, 6, 7, 13, 16, 18, 19, 24), synthesizer (1, 2, 11, 18), additional vocals (5), keyboards (5), guitar (10, 14), background vocals (11), acoustic guitar (22, 23)
- Nate Mercereau – guitar (1–3, 5–8, 10–13, 18), horn (1, 2, 11, 13, 18), synthesizer (1, 4, 6–8, 11), drums (2, 8, 10, 11, 17, 18), bass (3–6, 10, 11, 17), percussion (5, 8), French horn (8, 15, 17), glockenspiel (8), Mellotron (8), string arrangement (8, 15, 17), violin (8), background vocals (11), piano (17)
- Kid Harpoon – synthesizer (1, 2, 4–7, 10–13, 18), drums (2, 3, 5–7, 10, 12, 13, 18), guitar (2, 5–7, 10, 13, 18), programming (2, 3, 5–7, 11, 13, 18), bass (4, 10, 12, 13), piano (4, 11), additional vocals (5), string arrangement (5), Wurlitzer organ (5), background vocals (11)
- Edie Lehmann Boddicker – choir arrangement (2, 4, 8, 17, 18), background vocals (2, 4, 17, 18)
- Clydene Jackson – background vocals (2, 4, 8, 17, 18)
- Jarrett Johnson – background vocals (2, 4, 8, 17, 18)
- Nayanna Holley – background vocals (2, 4, 8, 17, 18)
- Toni Scruggs – background vocals (2, 4, 8, 17, 18)
- Scott Harris – piano (4), programming (4), synthesizer (4), additional vocals (5), background vocals (11)
- Andrew Gertler – additional vocals (5)
- Connor Brashier – additional vocals (5), background vocals (11)
- Josiah Van Dien – additional vocals (5), background vocals (11)
- Ziggy Chareton – additional vocals (5)
- Porter Shields – choir arrangement (5, 7, 12), background vocals (5, 7, 12)
- Amber Nicole – background vocals (5, 7, 12)
- Milla Santana – background vocals (5, 7, 12)
- Yvette Rovira – background vocals (5, 7, 12)
- Anderson Paak – drums (5), percussion (5)
- Rob Moose – strings (5)
- John Ryan – guitar (6), programming (6), synthesizer (6)
- Shaina Evoniuk – string arrangement (8, 15), strings (8), viola (15, 17), violin (15, 17)
- Leroy Horns – saxophone (10)
- Alyssa Rowatt – background vocals (11)
- Kaushlesh "Garry" Purohit – background vocals (11)
- Zubin Thakkar – background vocals (11), guitar (16, 17, 19–24), programming (16, 19), string arrangement (23)
- Ricky Reed – drum programming (11)
- Aaron Sterling – drums (13)
- Morgan Paros – string arrangement, strings (13)
- Ben Darwish – piano (15)
- Dave Haskett – bass (16, 19–24)
- Mike Sleath – drums (16, 19–24)
- Eddy Ruyter – keyboards (16, 19–24), Mellotron (16, 21)
- Surf Mesa – remixer (18)
- Jesse McGinty – horn (22, 23)
- Michael Cordone – horn (22, 23)
- Patrick Riley – strings (22–24), string arrangement (23)

Technical

- George Seara – mixer (1, 4–8, 10, 14, 17), recording engineer (1–12, 14, 17, 18), engineer (13)
- Mark "Spike" Stent – mixer (2, 3, 11–13, 18)
- Manny Marroquin – mixer (9, 15)
- Andrew Thornton – mixer (16, 19–24)
- Zubin Thakkar – mixer (16, 19–24), recording engineer (17)
- Randy Merrill – mastering engineer (3–8, 12–14, 18)
- Idania Valencia – mastering engineer (15, 16, 19–24)
- Jeremy Hatcher – recording engineer (1–4, 10, 11, 13, 18), engineer (5–8, 12, 14)
- Scott Harris – recording engineer (4)
- Frank Dukes – recording engineer (9)
- Josh Gudwin – recording engineer, vocal producer (9)
- Shawn Mendes – recording engineer (15)
- Michael Flaherty – recording engineer (16, 19–24)
- Tom Wood – recording engineer (16, 19–24)
- Nate Mercereau – recording engineer (17)
- Pete Min – recording engineer (17)
- Michael Lehman Boddicker – engineer (2, 4, 8, 17, 18)
- Brandon Leger – engineer (9)
- Tyler Murphy – engineer (9)
- Eddy Ruyter – engineer (21, 24)
- Robin Florent – mix engineer (9)
- Chris "TEK" O'Ryan – vocal engineer (9)
- Mike Gnocato – assistant mixer (1, 4–8, 10, 14)
- Matt Wolach – assistant mixer (3, 11–13)
- Chris Galland – assistant mixer (9)
- Jeremie Inhaber – assistant mixer (9)
- Kaushlesh "Garry" Purohit – assistant recording engineer (1–8, 10–14)

== Charts ==
=== Weekly charts ===
Weekly chart performance for Wonder
Chart (2020)	Peak position
Australian Albums (ARIA)	2
Austrian Albums (Ö3 Austria)	8
Belgian Albums (Ultratop Flanders)	4
Belgian Albums (Ultratop Wallonia)	24
Canadian Albums (Billboard)	1
Czech Albums (ČNS IFPI)	6
Danish Albums (Hitlisten)	10
Dutch Albums (Album Top 100)	3
Finnish Albums (Suomen virallinen lista)	22
French Albums (SNEP)	44
German Albums (Offizielle Top 100)	8
Hungarian Albums (MAHASZ)	20
Irish Albums (Official Charts)	11
Italian Albums (FIMI)	15
Japan Hot Albums (Billboard Japan)	66
Japanese Albums (Oricon)	75
Lithuanian Albums (AGATA)	6
New Zealand Albums (RMNZ)	4
Norwegian Albums (VG-lista)	6
Polish Albums (ZPAV)	12
Portuguese Albums (AFP)	5
Slovak Albums (IFPI)	8
Spanish Albums (PROMUSICAE)	5
Swedish Albums (Sverigetopplistan)	23
Swiss Albums (Schweizer Hitparade)	6
UK Albums (Official Charts)	12
US Billboard 200	1

=== Year-end charts ===
Year-end chart performance for Wonder
Chart (2021)	Position
US Billboard 200	165

== Certifications ==
Certifications for Wonder
Region	Certification	Certified units/sales
Brazil (Pro-Música Brasil)	2× Platinum	80,000^{‡}
Brazil (Pro-Música Brasil) Deluxe	2× Platinum	80,000^{‡}
Brazil (Pro-Música Brasil) Holiday Deluxe	2× Platinum	80,000^{‡}
Canada (Music Canada)	Platinum	80,000^{‡}
Denmark (IFPI Danmark)	Gold	10,000^{‡}
New Zealand (RMNZ)	Gold	7,500^{‡}
Poland (ZPAV)	Platinum	20,000^{‡}
^{‡} Sales+streaming figures based on certification alone.

== Release history ==
Release history for Wonder
Region	Date	Format	Label	Ref.
Various	December 4, 2020	Digital download; streaming	Island	
Worldwide	December 4, 2020	Cassette; CD; LP	Virgin EMI	

== See also ==
- List of 2020 albums
- List of Billboard 200 number-one albums of 2020
- List of number-one albums of 2020 (Canada)
