= Shawn Mendes: In Wonder =

- Official release poster
- Directed by: Grant Singer
- Produced by: Saul Germaine; James Haygood
- Starring: Shawn Mendes
- Cinematography: Adam Newport-Berra
- Edited by: Zachary Kashkett
- Production company: Netflix
- Distributed by: Netflix
- Release date: September 2020 (TIFF)
- Running time: 83 minutes
- Country: United States
- Language: English

Shawn Mendes: In Wonder is a 2020 American documentary film directed by Grant Singer. The film centers around singer-songwriter Shawn Mendes and depicts his everyday and on-stage life, as well as his battle against depression and anxiety.

The film premiered at the 2020 Toronto International Film Festival in advance of its release on November 23, 2020, by Netflix, and serves as a prelude to his fourth studio album, Wonder (2020).

== Premise ==
A portrait of the singer-songwriter's life, chronicling the past few years of his rise and journey.

== Cast ==
- Shawn Mendes
- Camila Cabello
- Aaliyah Mendes
- Karen Rayment
- Manuel Mendes
- Cez Darke
- Andrew Gertler

== Release ==
The film was released on November 23, 2020.

== Reception ==
On review aggregator website Rotten Tomatoes, the film holds an approval rating of 47% based on 15 critic reviews, with an average rating of 6.4/10. IndieWire's Ryan Lattanzio scored the film a C, and said "It's a pity that the documentary vehicle that surrounds him isn't more forthcoming about the man beneath the wife beaters and airtight skinny jeans who sends so many swooning, but surely must, at times, feel lonely late at night like the rest of us." Robyn Bahr of The Hollywood Reporter negatively reviewed the film, stating "When it was done, I wasn't sure I had watched anything at all". Several critics compared the film to Taylor Swift's 2020 Netflix documentary, Miss Americana, with many commenting that In Wonder tried to walk in its footsteps, but did not display the turbulence of fame, emotional turmoil, and revelation of Miss Americana.
