= StereoHeroes =

French electronic music duo

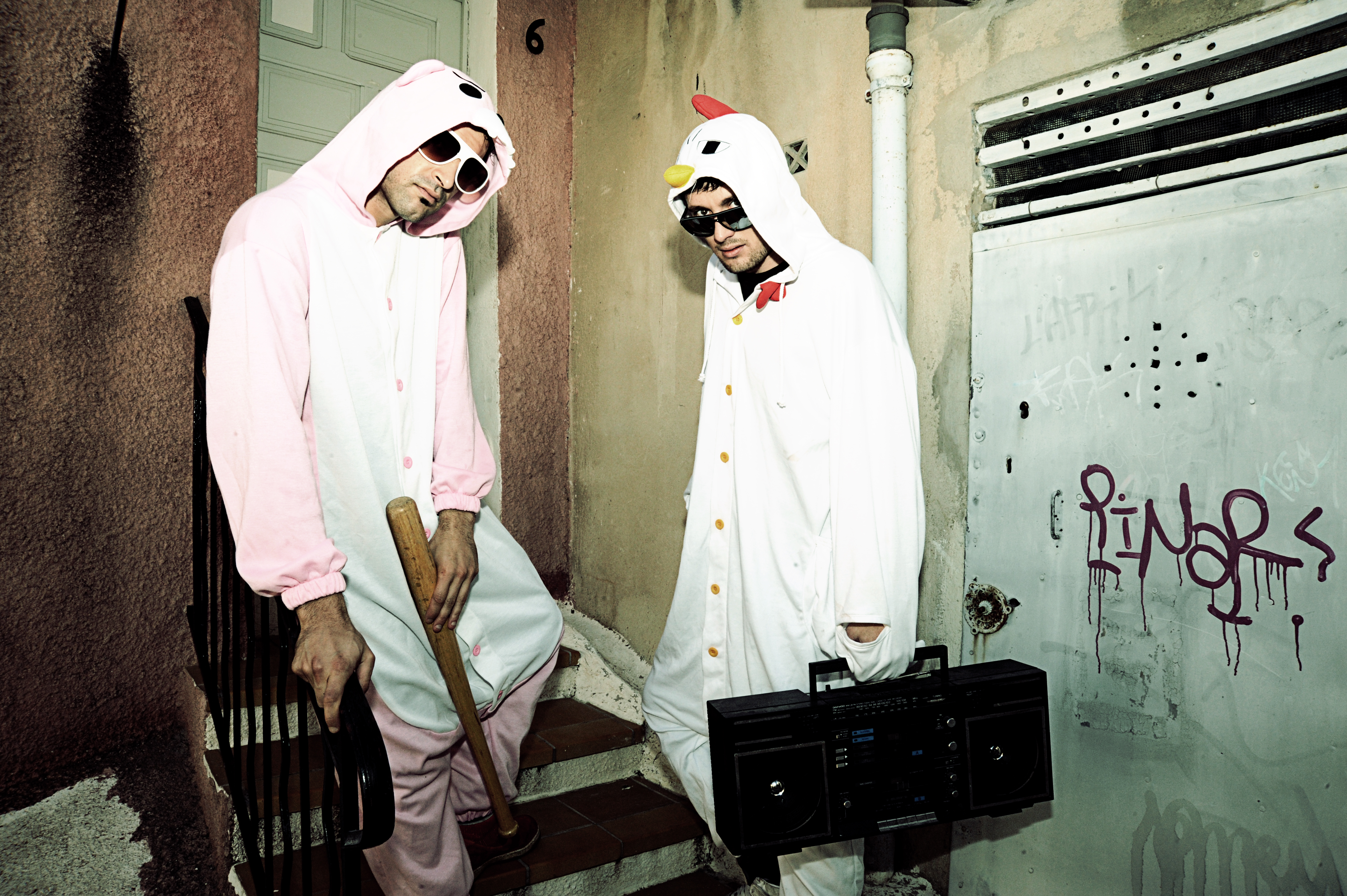
- Sébastien Plé & Fabrice Delcambre (Shot by Florian Gallène)

Background information
- Origin: France
- Genres: Techno; Hip hop House; Electro house
- Years active: 2008–present
- Labels: Dim Mak; Om Records; Boxon; Freakz Me Out
- Members: Fabrice Delcambre; Sébastien Plé
- Website: www.stereoheroes.com

StereoHeroes is a French electronic music duo, composed of Fabrice Delcambre and Sébastien Plé.

== Biography ==
StereoHeroes was formed in 2008 in the south of France. Quickly noticed by all the major international blogs, their first tracks, freely distributed, gave them an instant popularity around the world. They started then a never ending tour which took them in almost thirty countries. Their first official EP Boom Slang was released in 2009 on Leonizer Records, the label founded by Leonard de Leonard. It's followed in 2011 by Exiles on German label Freakz Me Out, and in 2012, by Deviations Vol.1 an EP exploring different musical territories and which will be followed by two other volumes in 2013. In the meantime, they released their third official EP, 8Ball, on Steve Aoki's Dim Mak Records. On the fringe of their commercial releases, StereoHeroes keep giving away original productions and remixes for free on a regular basis.

=== Key moments ===
- 2009 : Their remix of the track Kick It by Zingone & Nina Martine is used for the season 5 of So You Think You Can Dance.
- 2009 : Their track Lamborghini Lungz with South African rapper Spoek Mathambo and American Cerebral Vortex is selected by Diesel for their compilation Edges - A New French Electronic Generation amongst artists like Breakbot, Danger, Djedjotronic, Anoraak, among others.
- 2012 StereoHeroes signs at the same time on Om Records and Dim Mak Records for several EPs.

=== Tour ===
Since 2008, StereoHeroes played in the following countries : South Africa, Germany, England, Australia, Austria, Belgium, Canada, South Korea, Spain, France, Netherlands, Hong Kong, Indonesia, Italia, Japan, Malaysia, Mexico, Norway, Poland, Portugal, Russia, Sweden, Switzerland, Taiwan, Thailand, Vietnam.

=== Support ===
StereoHeroes received support from Tiësto.

=== Anecdotes ===
- All the tracks, EPs and mixtapes from StereoHeroes are named after comics characters or teams and organizations from Marvel Universe.

== Discography ==
=== Singles and EP ===
==== Boom Slang EP ====
Leonizer Records (2009)

1. Boom Slang
2. Boom Slang (StereoHeroes 2009 Remix)
3. Booby Trap
4. Fukt (2009 Radio Reedit feat. Teen Wolf
5. Fever Pitch (Vocal Mix feat. Little Prince)
6. Boom Slang (Mixhell Remix)
7. Boom Slang (Rayflash Remix)
8. Fever Pitch

==== The Lost Generation ====
Free release (2010)

1. "Effigy"
2. "Pixie"

==== Exiles ====
Freakz Me Out (2011)

1. Wild Child
2. Wild Child (Le Castle Vania Remix)
3. Night Hawk
4. Longshot (John Lord Fonda 'Hard Disco' Remix)
5. Longshot
6. Night Hawk (Blatta & Inesha Remix)
7. Wild Child (Dub Version)

==== Deviations Vol.1 ====
Om Records (2012)

1. Blackbot
2. Numbers
3. Waxworks

==== 8 Ball EP ====
Dim Mak Records (2012)

1. Crystal
2. Polaris

==== New Noise Vol.4 ====
Dim Mak Records (2013)

1. Storm

==== Deviations Vol.2 ====
Free release (2013)

1. Sunspot
2. Mercury

=== Remixes ===
Artist	Track	Label
Infected Mushroom	Nation of Wusses	Dim Mak Records
Spencer & Hill	Dance	Dim Mak Records
Atari Teenage Riot	Collapse of History	Dim Mak Records
Mr Dirty Smart ft. Dutch Courage	Break Ya Neck	Passenger Records
Robopunx	Robomonster ft. Whiskey Pete	Royal One Records
The Boomzers	We are back	Freakz Me Out
UTOK2ME?	Volodia	Electromenager Records
Leonard de Leonard	Beat Beat Beat	Leonizer Records
Make The Girl Dance	Wall of Death	Roy Music
Missill feat. Spoek Mathambo	Invincible	Atmosphériques
Keewix feat. Messinian	Mariachi Loco	Sunshine Records
AmpLive	Hot Right Now	Om Records
The Mastertrons	Fat Man	Shakeyourassrecords
The Hijack Brothers	Vengeance	Crack House Records
Dirty Disco Youth	Minds Off	Dim Mak Records
Missill	Chuppa	Citizen records
Greenskeepers	Live like you wanna live	Om Records
Gtronic	Iron Man	BMKLTSCH
Underhall	Digithall	On the fruit Records
Suckshaft	Zealot	G-Point Music
Designer Drugs	Riot	Iheartcomix
Maral Salmassi	Let's rock the party	Television Rocks
Just a band	To hell with gravity	Homework Records
Zingone & Nina	Kick It	Starlight
Mendel	Beatburger	Place Blanche
Kaz Nishimura	Loverevo	Electric Juice
Relentless	Monolove	Baconwave
Mustard Pimp	Oh La La Satan	Crux Records
Jean Moustache	Rambonette	VCH Records
Ze Bug	Fabulous	Level75
DR. 1008	Taekwondo	Rescue the beat

=== Unreleased and free tracks ===
- StereoHeroes - Ammo (Original Mix)
- M.I.A.- Bad Girls (StereoHeroes ‘BattleSheep’ Edit)
- The Offspring - Come out and play (StereoHeroes remix)
- Djedjotronic feat. Spoek - Dirty & Hard (StereoHeroes remix)
- Far East Movement - Boomshake (StereoHeroes Remix)
- StereoHeroes feat. Mic Terror - Juke dem hoes
- StereoHeroes - Blackout
- StereoHeroes - Fin Fang Foom
- StereoHeroes - Washout
- StereoHeroes - Action Pack (Original instrumental)
- StereoHeroes feat. Da Chick - Action Pack (Laser trip)
- StereoHeroes - Moon Knight
- StereoHeroes feat. Teen Wolf - Midnight Sons
- StereoHeroes - Black Lama
- Emmanuel Top - Acid Phase (StereoHeroes ‘21st Century’ Edit)

=== Mixtapes ===
- 2008 : NLLR Mixtape 036 by StereoHeroes
- 2008 : StereoHeroes exclusive mixtape for Sick & Spinning
- 2009 : StereoHeroes - Project Wideawake (Mixtape)
- 2010 : StereoHeroes - Action Pack (The Mixtape)
- 2010 : StereoHeroes exclusive mini mix for Cyberpunkers Flash in Punk Radio show
- 2010 : StereoHeroes - Burn Paris Burn # 7 ("Bye Bye Violence")
- 2011 : StereoHeroes - The Conspiracy (Mixtape)
- 2012 : StereoHeroes - The Order (Mixtape)
- 2012 : StereoHeroes - Deviations (The Mixtapes) #1
- 2013 : StereoHeroes - The Called (Metrojolt.com guest mix)
- 2013 : StereoHeroes Exclusive Minimix for the Cheap Lettus Show (Australia)
- 2013 : StereoHeroes - Crushes Sessions #1
- 2014 : StereoHeroes - Crushes Sessions #2
- 2014 : StereoHeroes - Crushes Sessions #3
