= Clique (Kanye West, Jay-Z and Big Sean song) =

Single by Kanye West, Jay-Z and Big Sean

from the album Cruel Summer
- Released: September 7, 2012
- Studio: Record One, Los Angeles; Jungle City, New York City
- Length: 4:53
- Label: GOOD; Def Jam
- Songwriters: Chauncey Hollis; Sean Anderson; Kanye West; Shawn Carter; James Fauntleroy
- Producers: Hit-Boy; Kanye West

Kanye West singles chronology
"Birthday Song" (2012)	"Clique" (2012)	"Diamonds" (remix) (2012)

Jay-Z singles chronology
"No Church in the Wild" (2012)	"Clique" (2012)	"Suit & Tie" (2013)

Big Sean singles chronology
"As Long as You Love Me" (2012)	"Clique" (2012)	"Burn" (2012)

GOOD Music singles chronology
"New God Flow" (2012)	"Clique" (2012)	"Champions" (2016)

"Clique" is a song by American rappers Kanye West, Jay-Z, and Big Sean from West's record label GOOD Music's debut compilation album, Cruel Summer (2012). The song features additional vocals from Cocaine 80s, Aude Cardona, and Travis Jones. It was produced by Hit-Boy, while co-produced by West, and additional production was handled by Anthony Kilhoffer alongside Noah Goldstein. Numerous rappers recorded verses for the song, yet only West, Jay-Z, and Big Sean made the final cut. Two days after it leaked, the song was debuted via West's website on September 7, 2012, and simultaneously released for digital download as the album's fourth and final single, through GOOD Music and Def Jam.

"Clique" has a dark beat, with the song including a sample of James Brown's "Funky President (People It's Bad)". The rappers use the lyrics to brag about their clique's strength. The song received generally positive reviews from music critics, with them mostly highlighting the production. Some praised West's verse and a few writers complimented Jay-Z's presence, while critical reception towards Big Sean's verse was somewhat less positive. The song was ranked amongst year-end lists for 2012 by multiple publications, including NME and The Washington Post. It was one of the Award Winning R&B/Hip-Hop Songs at the ASCAP Rhythm & Soul Music Awards in 2014.

In the United States, "Clique" reached number 12 on the Billboard Hot 100 and number 2 on the Hot R&B/Hip-Hop Songs chart. It further charted within the top 50 on the main charts in six other countries, including Canada and the United Kingdom. The song has been certified quadruple platinum and gold in the US and the UK by the Recording Industry Association of America (RIAA) and British Phonographic Industry (BPI), respectively. West ranted over a version of its backing track at the Revil Oviation Hall in December 2012, and performed the song live during The Yeezus Tour (2013–14). A remix of the song, featuring T.I., premiered in November 2012.

== Background and recording ==
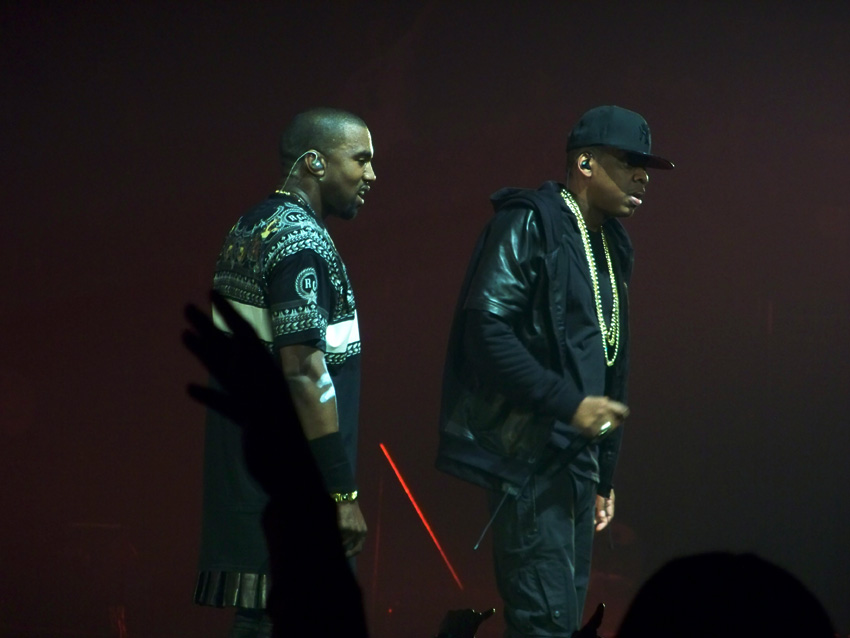
West and Jay-Z pictured on their Watch the Throne Tour that ran from 2011 to 2012, concluding in the wake of the song's release.

"Clique" marked the first musical collaboration between Kanye West and Jay-Z since their joint studio album Watch the Throne (2011), though they had finished the accompanying tour of the same name in the summer of 2012. Speaking to MTV News in September, Big Sean explained that he initially recorded the song's chorus "in London to the beat and 'Ye liked it or whatever", before being the first performer to record his verse. The rapper stated that after sending the verse to West, he "didn't hear anything back for a while [but] then people were talking about it". Big Sean recounted running into fellow rapper 2 Chainz in the meantime and receiving his approval of the song, until he was told during a phone call that Jay-Z was on it and "was like, 'damn'". Due to both West and Jay-Z providing verses, Big Sean confessed that he thought "they're probably gonna take my verse off even though I laced it" yet was told via the phone, "Nah, it's you Kanye and Jay-Z." In an interview with Tim Westwood, Big Sean revealed that many "grade-A rappers" recorded verses for the song but were not selected by West for the final cut. He did remember that the verses "were real legit", despite only him, West, and Jay-Z not being cut. In 2011, record producer Hit-Boy helped produce West and Jay-Z's "Niggas in Paris". The producer recalled "doing me once again" for "Clique", saying he "made a beat" that West liked "and we built on it", before the beat eventually became the song. Of working with West, Hit-Boy explained, "Nothing is ever right the first time, or the second time, or the third time." He continued, asserting that you have to "keep going until it appeases him" and he feels as if West is "always right". The song was produced by Hit-Boy, with co-production from West, and additional production from Anthony Kilhoffer and Noah Goldstein.

On September 5, 2012, TMZ leaked a 30-second snippet of "Clique"; West, Jay-Z, Big Sean, and Hit-Boy had been announced earlier that week to be collaborating on the song. The same day as the leak, West posted the song's cover art to his website. West debuted the song in full through the website on September 7, 2012. Simultaneously, it was premiered by DJ Funkmaster Flex for Hot 97 and released as a single. West references his partner Kim Kardashian on the song, following on from him having rapped about his lovers in the past, including Amber Rose. "Cold" was released in April 2012, with it seeing West declare his love for Kardashian. While previewing tracks recorded for Cruel Summer in August 2012, West played a song entitled "Perfect Bitch", which he gave confirmation of being written about her. Fellow rapper Pusha T had recorded a verse for "Clique", though it was instead used by him on Hit-Boy's track "Bussin Moves" in September 2015.

== Composition and lyrics ==
"Clique"
A 27-second sample of "Clique", featuring the end of Big Sean's verse being followed by his hook. During the hook, he brags that nobody is "fuckin' with" or "fresher than" his "motherfuckin' clique".

Musically, "Clique" has a dark beat, as well as industrial sounds. It contains a sample of American funk musician James Brown's 1974 recording "Funky President (People It's Bad)". Staccato Stylophone synth lines are prominent throughout the song, being accompanied by hiccups. The song includes throbbing bass, which contains slurs. It also heavily features drums. Big Sean performs first, contributing the hook and a verse to the song. His verse is followed by Jay-Z's, before West performs the last verse for around one minute and 30 seconds. Additional vocals are contributed to the song by Cocaine 80s, Aude Cardona, and Travis Jones.

In the lyrics of the song, the rappers boast about the strength of their clique. On the hook, Big Sean asserts that nobody is on the level of his clique. During his verse, Big Sean brags about being up for nine days. Jay-Z delves into his past, reminding listeners of the personal costs from his success as well as the risks taken by him to achieve it. West raps arrogantly about a number of topics, including reflection on race and wealth, his real estate ambitions, and meditating in Pompeii. He expresses pride in Kardashian having become famous as a result of her sex tape with singer Ray J, rapping: "My girl a superstar all from a home movie."

== Release and reception ==
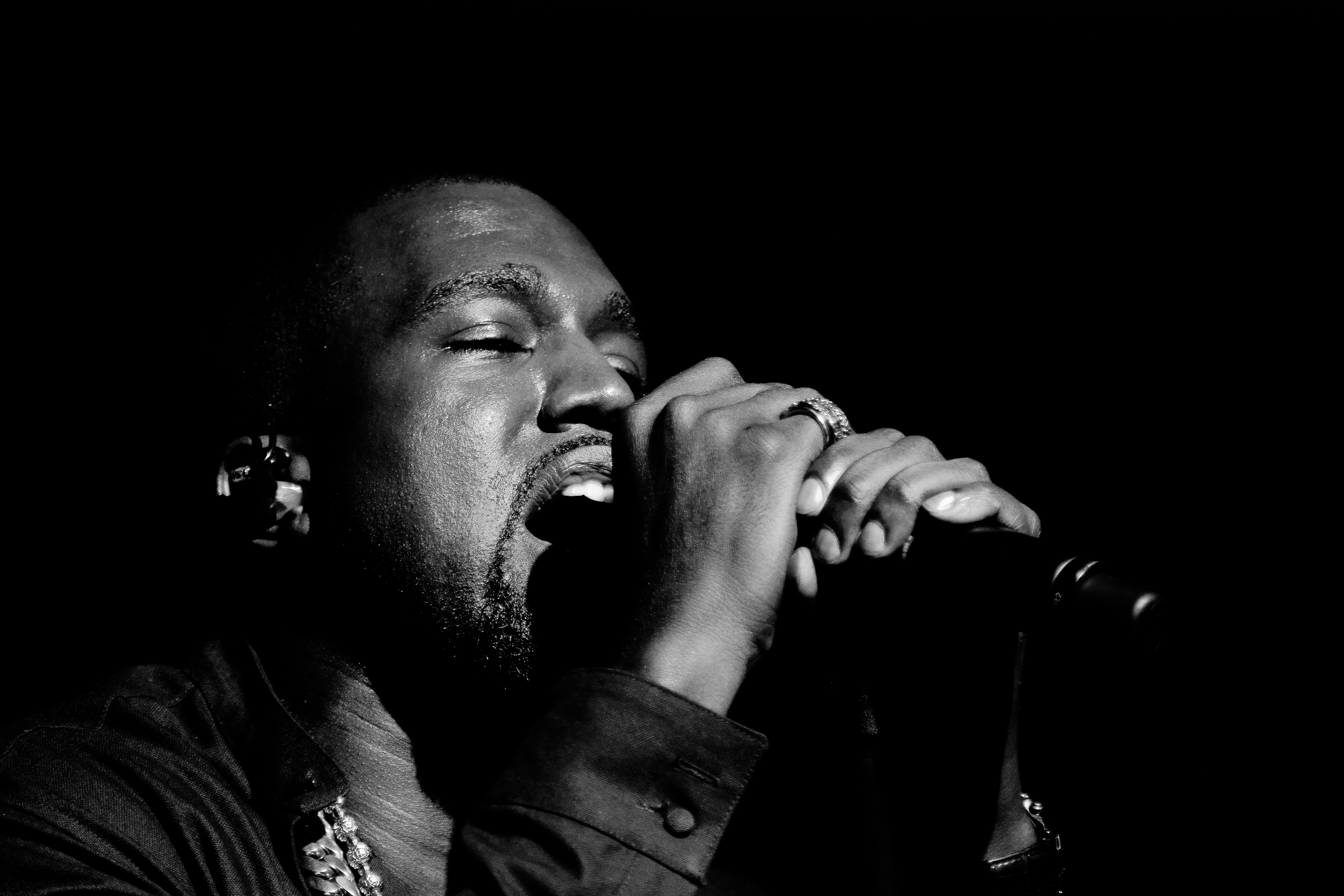
West's verse was received with praise from several reviewers; they primarily applauded his lyrics.

On September 7, 2012, "Clique" was released for digital download in various countries by GOOD Music and Def Jam as the fourth single from the album. 11 days later, the song was included as the second track on GOOD Music's debut compilation album Cruel Summer. The song was met with generally positive reviews from music critics, who were mostly complementary towards the production. Josh Stillman from Entertainment Weekly cited the song as demonstrating West's continuous "incapabl[ity] of making bad music", liking the "off-kilter beat" as well as West's "inventive lyrics" that he considered to lie "among his most clever". In The Independent, Andy Gill acclaimed the production style over it bringing "a sinister, stalking ambience that matches the blend of money, mystery and menace" provided by collaborators on the album. Pitchfork critic Jayson Greene gave praise to Hit-Boy's production on the song, comparing the "transfixing" collection of hiccups and synths to record producer Timbaland's work. He concluded by recognizing the song as "haughty, spotless, and coldly perfect; it sounds like bottle service". In a review of the song for the Chicago Tribune, Adam Lukach and Lucheezy rated it three out of four stars, saying that even though the texture "is relatively thin", the beat "sounds ready to bubble over" in a similar manner to "a pot of molten gold". The writers appreciated the song as "the perfect platform" for West and Jay-Z's lyrical performances while dismissing Big Sean's lyricism and flow, specifically commenting that he stumbles over the latter and opining he is "just here for the hook".

For Spin, Christopher R. Weingarten labeled the beat "nothing short of a masterwork" that is reminiscent of "a hiccupping Gil-Scott Heron (via Jamie xx) sneaking under the very last gasp" of rip-offs of Lil Wayne's "A Milli" (2008), while he viewed West's verse as overshadowing other artists' contributions to the album because of the lyrics. Jonah Weiner of Rolling Stone wrote of how Jay-Z's "breezy self-regard overflows into Spanish" on the song, though pointed out West for being the superior performer with his "classic head-spinner" of a verse. Michael Madden was more lukewarm at Consequence of Sound; he admitted to not taking the same liking to the song as others were but assured "its bass-slurs and monstrous opera samples prove worthy" of West and Jay-Z's reunion, and picked "Clique" as one of the essential tracks on Cruel Summer. The New York Times' Jon Caramanica was split in his feelings of the song, being appreciative of West's "volatile" performance for "swerving in new directions with each couplet" but showing disgust towards Big Sean's unforgivable referencing of himself "as B.I.G." due to it "lazily and gratuitously invoking the memory" of fellow rapper the Notorious B.I.G.

=== Accolades ===
On September 7, 2012, Pitchfork selected the song as the best new track. Ian Cohen of the publication positively compared Hit-Boy's production to his work on "Niggas in Paris" and disregarded Big Sean's verse, even though he praised Jay-Z's "wholly expected, sorta comforting" performance. Cohen continued; he lauded West for using a platform "to talk his shit again", and finished by questioning that the song may be "center of the universe-type shit". "Clique" was voted 44th on the Pazz & Jop poll of The Village Voice for 2012; it received 10 mentions and was tied with 6 other songs for the position. The track was listed by Complex as the 15th best song of 2012 and the magazine's DD considered the beat "the next best thing" after "Niggas in Paris" as well as praising Big Sean, Jay-Z, and West for delivering "all-star verses". Dagbladet and NME also positioned the track at number 15 on their respective lists of the year's best songs, with Talia Soghomonian of the latter publication citing it as properly proving that West "was still turning out solid gold" after Watch the Throne. The track was ranked by both Goûte mes disques and The Washington Post as the ninth best song of 2012, and its strongest achievement was being picked as the year's fourth best song by Dummy Mag. Jay-Z's verse on the song was named the fifth best of 2012 by Complex, with the staff mostly acclaiming his subject matter. At the 2014 ASCAP Rhythm & Soul Music Awards, the song was one of the Award Winning R&B/Hip-Hop Songs. "Clique" was awarded as one of the 35 Most Performed R&B/Hip-Hop Songs at the BMI R&B/Hip-Hop Awards in 2014, and received a nomination for World's Best Song at the 2014 World Music Awards.

Year-end lists for "Clique"
Publication	Accolade	Rank	Ref.
Complex	The 50 Best Songs of 2012	15	
Dagbladet	The 50 Best Songs of 2012	15	
Dummy Mag	The 20 Best Songs of 2012	4	
Focus Vif	Top 50 Singles of 2012	32	
Goûte mes disques	Top Singles of 2012	9	
NME	The 50 Best Tracks of 2012	15	
Paste	The 50 Best Songs of 2012	49	
Triple J	Hottest 100 of 2012	96	
The Washington Post	The Best Songs of 2012	9	
The Village Voice	The Pazz & Jop Music Critics Poll 2012	44	

== Commercial performance ==
On the US Billboard Hot 100, "Clique" entered at number 55. In its second week on the chart, the song climbed to number 12. The song remained on the Hot 100 for a total of 22 weeks. As of May 31, 2018, it ranks as West's 17th biggest hit on the chart. Simultaneously with its peak on the Hot 100, the song reached number two on the US Digital Songs chart, with 209,000 sales. This was a rise of 14 places from the song's position of number 16 one week prior, while it experienced a 182% increase in sales. The song topped the component US Rap Digital Songs chart, becoming West's first track to do so. "Clique" further peaked at number two on the US Hot R&B/Hip-Hop Songs, Hot Rap Songs, and Rhythmic charts. On November 29, 2012, the song was certified platinum by the Recording Industry Association of America (RIAA) for selling 1,000,000 digital copies in the United States, becoming the second single from Cruel Summer to achieve the certification. It was later certified quadruple platinum by the RIAA for pushing 4,000,000 certified units in the country on April 7, 2022.

In Canada, the song debuted at number 79 on the Canadian Hot 100 for the issue dated September 22, 2012, before rising to its peak of number 17 the following week. The song lasted for 11 weeks on the chart. Elsewhere, it peaked at number 22 on the UK Singles Chart. "Clique" spent 18 weeks on the chart and as of August 19, 2017, it stand as Jay-Z's 14th most successful track of all time in the United Kingdom. The song also ranks as West's 20th biggest track of all time in the country up to October 24, 2019. On March 15, 2019, the song was certified gold by the British Phonographic Industry (BPI) for selling 400,000 units in the UK. "Clique" further attained top 50 positions on the singles charts in Scotland, Denmark, Australia, and France, while receiving a gold certification from IFPI Denmark for 45,000 shipments in the second of the four countries.

== Live performances ==
During Big Sean's first arena show at the Palace in his homestate of Michigan on December 1, 2012, he brought out West for a performance of "Clique" as part of the encore. For West's three night concert at the Revil Ovation Hall in Atlantic City, New Jersey, he performed the song as the first night's second track on December 28, 2012. After performing the song, West delivered a 10-minute freestyle rant over a spare acoustic version of its backing track. The rant saw West complain about his lack of nominations for the 2013 Grammy Awards, the criticism of his women's fashion line, and the media, who the rapper responded to by asserting that he "ain't crazy" but is "just not satisfied". West further ranted against American singers Justin Timberlake and Taylor Swift, as well as criticizing corporate sponsorships and wealth, while the rapper also spoke of his cancelled tour with singer Lady Gaga, death threats from people on Twitter, his plans for the future, and skinny jeans.

West performed a faithful take on the song at the 2013 Governors Ball, being backed by a modest DJ setup. The song was performed live by him on The Yeezus Tour (2013–14). West delivered a performance of the song for the Wireless Festival in 2014, with the crowd chanting along as he performed. During West's headlining set at the 2015 Glastonbury Festival, he performed the song, starting at the 25:06 mark. The crowd echoed words from the song back at West, who responded with a vague smile.

== Appearances in media ==
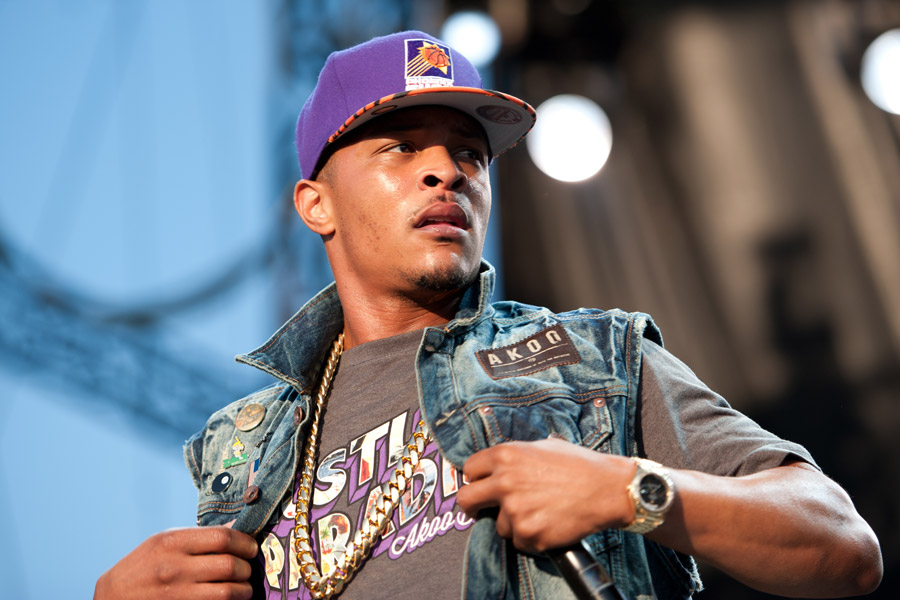
T.I. recorded a verse for a remix of the song that was shared in November 2012.

Rapper Rick Ross released a re-worked version of "Clique" on his third mixtape The Black Bar Mitzvah in October 2012, which features fellow rappers Gunplay and Rockie Fresh. On November 13, 2012, DJ MLK premiered a remix of "Clique" that features rapper T.I. The remix includes a 16-bar verse from T.I., with him bragging that nobody does it like his "motherfuckin' clique". Duo gLAdiator posted their remix of the song to SoundCloud on November 26, 2012. A club remix, it heavily adds bass to the vocals. The remix was later included on a 12" vinyl for the song that was released in the UK on January 15, 2013.

While appearing alongside Kc Chopz at Power 106 on January 13, 2013, rapper ASAP Rocky freestyled over the song's original version. On January 28, Canadian electronic band Keys N Krates shared a remix of the song. The remix mostly relies on a snare drum for its build, and contains syncopated percussion, vocal stutters, and screwing that is applied to Big Sean's vocals. On January 20, 2020, former US First Lady Michelle Obama included the song on her workout playlist.

== Track listings ==
Digital download

1. "Clique" – 4:53

UK 12" vinyl Remixes

A-side

1. "Clique" (Dirty Version) – 4:53
2. "Clique" (Enferno Remix) – 3:13
3. "Clique" (Black Dogs Remix) – 4:21
4. 50 Cent – "What Up Gangsta" (Dennis Blaze Clique Remix) – 3:27

B-side

1. "Clique" (Tek One 128-82 Transition) – 6:00
2. "Clique" (gLAdiator Remix) – 3:29
3. "Clique" (Slinks Trapsteezy Remix) – 5:03

== Credits and personnel ==
Information taken from Cruel Summer liner notes.

Recording

- Recorded at Record One (Sherman Oaks, CA) and Jungle City (NYC)
- Mixed at Island Sound Studios (Hawaii)

Personnel

- Hit-Boy – songwriter, production
- Kanye West – songwriter, co-production
- Sean Anderson – songwriter
- Shawn Carter – songwriter
- James Fauntleroy – songwriter
- Noah Goldstein – additional production, recording
- Anthony Kilhoffer – additional production, mixer
- Rob Kinelski – recording
- Richard Parry – additional recording
- Christian Mochizuki – assistant mixer
- Eric Kelekolio – assistant mixer
- Gaylord Holomalia – assistant mixer
- Cocaine 80s – additional vocals
- Aude Cardona – additional vocals
- Travis Jones – additional vocals

== Charts ==
=== Weekly charts ===
Chart performance for "Clique"
Chart (2012–2013)	Peak position
Australia (ARIA)	39
Belgium (Ultratip Bubbling Under Flanders)	33
Belgium Urban (Ultratop Flanders)	13
Belgium (Ultratip Bubbling Under Wallonia)	36
Canada Hot 100 (Billboard)	17
Denmark (Tracklisten)	36
France (SNEP)	43
Netherlands (Single Top 100)	85
Scottish Singles Sales (Official Charts)	30
UK Singles (Official Charts)	22
UK Hip Hop/R&B (Official Charts)	4
US Billboard Hot 100	12
US Hot R&B/Hip-Hop Songs (Billboard)	2
US Hot Rap Songs (Billboard)	2
US Rhythmic Airplay (Billboard)	2

=== Year-end charts ===
2012 year-end chart performance for "Clique"
Chart (2012)	Position
Belgium Urban (Ultratop Flanders)	85
UK Singles (OCC)	195
US Hot R&B/Hip-Hop Songs (Billboard)	59

2013 year-end chart performance for "Clique"
Chart (2013)	Position
Belgium Urban (Ultratop Flanders)	84
US Hot R&B/Hip-Hop Songs (Billboard)	29
US Hot Rap Songs (Billboard)	23
US Rhythmic (Billboard)	34

== Certifications ==
Certifications and sales for "Clique"
Region	Certification	Certified units/sales
Denmark (IFPI Danmark)	Gold	45,000^{‡}
New Zealand (RMNZ)	Platinum	30,000^{‡}
United Kingdom (BPI)	Gold	400,000^{‡}
United States (RIAA)	4× Platinum	4,000,000^{‡}
^{‡} Sales+streaming figures based on certification alone.

== Release history ==
Release dates and formats for "Clique"
Region	Date	Format	Version	Label(s)	Ref.
Various	September 7, 2012	Digital download	Original	GOOD; Def Jam	
United Kingdom	January 15, 2013	12" vinyl	Remixes	GOOD; Def Jam	
