= Studio 11 =

Chicago recording studio

Coordinates: 41°53′7.4″N 87°38′3.9″W

- Industry: Recording Studio
- Founded: Chicago, Illinois; 1996
- Founder: Alex Gross; Dan Scalpone
- Headquarters: Chicago
- Key people: Alex Gross; Dan Scalpone
- Website: studio11chicago.com

Studio 11 is a recording studio in Chicago which began in 1996. Best known for hip hop, duranguense, gangsta rap, and house music styles, Studio 11 has recorded, mixed, and mastered over 35,000 songs.

== History ==
=== Early history ===
Studio 11 was initially opened in a coach house building at 11 East Superior Street by Alex Gross and Dan Scalpone, while students of sound engineering at Columbia College in Chicago. By 1999, the studio had expanded to the top floor at 209 W. Lake St. with two music studios accommodating a larger volume of recording. Early adaptation of digital technology, established Studio 11 as a premiere destination for recording rap and electronic music, highlighted by the early works of Kanye West, Lupe Fiasco, Yung Berg, and Crucial Conflict in addition to recent recordings with Rockie Fresh, Cashis, and French rapper Gradur.

=== Music ===
Gross, the studio's founder, became known with the recording of Payroll 125, a rap album featuring the Kanye West produced song Never Change, which was sold to Jay Z and re-released on The Blueprint., a critically acclaimed album of his. In 2011, Studio 11 became a curator for WFMU New York's Free Music Archive. The studio released nearly 200 contributions with over 100,000 downloads, featuring Greenskeepers, Glass Lux, Track Jackit, Angel Alanis, The Dread, and other artists.

== Notable clients ==
Rockie Fresh	K-Paz de la Sierra	Memphis Bleek
Crucial Conflict	Cashis	Patrulla 81
Yung Berg	No I.D.	Greenskeepers
Flavor Flav	Adela Popescu	Ron Carroll
Lil Herb	B Howard	Lupe Fiasco
Young Thug	Kanye West	Gradur
C-Sick	Lil Durk	Seventh Wonder
Akon	Snoop Dogg	Juice
Do or Die	Groove Armada	Shawnna
Mos Def	Straight No Chaser	Dave Dresden
Warner Music Group	Atlantic Records	Om Records
King L	BT	Silversun Pickups
Filligar

== Selected recordings ==
=== Albums ===
Year	Album	Artist
2010	The Otherside	Rockie Fresh
2013	Driving 88	Rockie Fresh
2013	Electric Highway	Rockie Fresh
2001	Payroll 125	Payroll and Kanye West
2006	Ziggy Franklin Radio Show	James Curd, Greenskeepers
2005	Pleetch	Greenskeepers
2005	Thank You Lenny	Treologic
2006	Succession, I Guess	Filligar
2007	The City Tree	Filligar
2008	Near or Far	Filligar
2010	The Nerve	Filligar
2003	Is There A Signal Coming Through	Life At Sea
2012	Fly Over State	Fly Over State
2015	L'homme Au Bob	Gradur
2006	Block Music	Shawnna
2008	Planet Crucon	Crucial Conflict
2015	Building A New Chicago	Track Jackit

=== Singles ===
Year	Song	Artist
2013	Vraja ta	D.J. Project feat. Adela
2014	The Unbreakable Grayarea Mix	BT
2009	Cloud Atlas	Dave Dresden & Grayarea
2007	Little Lover's So Polite Grayarea Remix	Silversun Pickups
2014	A.C. Green	Rockie Fresh
2012	Into The Future	Rockie Fresh
2010	Warsaw James Curd Remix	Groove Armada
2012	Dat Ass	Ron Carroll feat. Kima'Chelle
2012	Insane	Y.P. feat. Rockie Fresh
2013	Rub A Dub	Y.P. feat. King Louie
2012	Bingo Players	Rattle feat. Ron Carroll
2015	I'm A Machine	Glass Lux
2008	Barnfire	Crucial Conflict
2009	What's Poppin' Ride?	Butta Da Prince
2007	Lake Park	Butta Da Prince
2008	Styrafoam Cups	JDP

=== 12" Vinyl Singles / EPs ===
Year	Song	Artist
2004	Neurobotic	Hidden Variable
2001	The Dancing Wu Li Masters EP	Hidden Variable
2002	Polarities 1 Of 2: Positive	Hidden Variable
2004	Lunar	Gabriel Palomo & Lee Chameleon
2012	Crush Your Idols	SanFaçon
2012	When The Angels Fell	SanFaçon
2012	Midnight At Dusk Hotel	Silentcorp
2012	Naked Came The Stranger	Silentcorp
2012	Intrinsic	Gabriel Palomo
2012	Group Modulo	Kuya
2014	Curiosity	Mikey Yellow
2014	Pattern Recognition	Linear
2011	Chicago House Music EP Part 1	Gene Farris
2011	Chicago House Music EP Part 2	Gene Farris

=== Films ===
Year	Film	Director	Musical Score
2003	When Thugs Cry	Parris Reaves	Alex Gross
2005	The Evil One	Parris Reaves	Alex Gross and Dan Scalpone
