= Monster (Shawn Mendes and Justin Bieber song) =

2020 single by Shawn Mendes and Justin Bieber

Single by Shawn Mendes and Justin Bieber

from the album Wonder
- Released: November 20, 2020
- Genre: Pop
- Length: 2:58
- Label: Island
- Songwriters: Shawn Mendes; Justin Bieber; Adam Feeney; Ashton Simmonds; Mustafa Ahmed
- Producer: Frank Dukes

Shawn Mendes singles chronology
"Wonder" (2020)	"Monster" (2020)	"Count On Me" (2021)

Justin Bieber singles chronology
"Mood (Remix)" (2020)	"Monster" (2020)	"Anyone" (2021)

Music video
- "Monster" on YouTube

"Monster" is a song by Canadian singers Shawn Mendes and Justin Bieber. It was released through Island Records as the second single from the former's fourth studio album, Wonder, on November 20, 2020. The song was produced by Frank Dukes and additionally produced by Matthew Tavares and Kaan Güneşberk. The two artists wrote it with Dukes alongside Daniel Caesar and Mustafa the Poet. All producers and songwriters are Canadian.

== Background ==
Rumours about a possible collaboration began in July 2020 after Bieber and Mendes were spotted with American singer-songwriter Tori Kelly, jamming around on a piano, when Bieber's manager, Scooter Braun, posted videos of them. In August 2020, the two artists were spotted with Bieber's wife, American model Hailey Bieber, at American record producer Andrew Watt's recording studio in Los Angeles, California, fuelling speculation of an upcoming collaboration between the two Canadian artists. During an interview on Capital Breakfast with Roman Kemp on October 6, 2020, Mendes was asked if he turned down a collaboration with Bieber in September, to which he replied: "Is this you trying to get me to confirm that I have a collaboration with Justin Bieber? I didn't last month". He said that it would be "insane" for him to turn it down, considering that Bieber has been one of his favourite artists since he was nine years old. He stated that he cannot confirm or deny", but added that their relationship in the past six months leading up to the time of the interview has grown closer. "It's really cool to have him as a mentor in a lot of ways, just to kind of talk through stuff with, because there's not many people who do this type of stuff," he furtherly explained, describing Bieber as "freakishly talented". The song marks the first time the two singers have worked together. In an exclusive interview for Apple Music, Mendes told Zane Lowe that the single is "about how society can put celebrities up on a pedestal and watch them fall". Mendes called it "one of the most special songs" he had ever written.

== Composition and lyrics ==
"Monster" is a pop song that is set in the key of D minor, vocal range spans from C_{4} to G_{5} with a tempo of 146 beats per minute. Lyrically, the song is about the pitfalls and pressure of stardom. Mendes stated: "It's about how society can put celebrities up on a pedestal and watch them fall and it seems to be this entertainment thing. And it's hard."

== Release and promotion ==
The song was first revealed on September 29, 2020, when Mendes launched an interactive VR experience on a website for the album, in which a "set list" showed a track titled "Monster" with a special guest. On November 13, 2020, Mendes released the official album tracklist, confirming the song's title, while its co-lead artist remains unannounced. On November 16, 2020, Mendes and Bieber both posted a 13-second teaser clip on social media, officially announcing the release date of the collaboration, which serves as the second single from the album after "Wonder". The teaser features a synthy instrumental playing in the background, with the song's title, release date and the two artist's names overlaid on top of four outdoor scenes in dimly lit and foggy conditions, including an empty street with streetlights, a forest, and an empty platform with stairs. On November 18, 2020, Mendes and Bieber posted the song's cover art on social media, as well as pre-order links for the single, which includes limited CD singles with two different exclusive covers available on the singers' respective online stores.

== Accolades ==
Awards and nominations for "Monster"
Year	Organization	Award	Result	Ref(s)
2021	MTV Millennial Awards Brazil	International Collaboration	Won	

== Music video ==
The music video was directed by Colin Tilley and released via YouTube on November 20, 2020. The video is shot in one single take, and starts with Mendes walking through the woods onto a cube platform with stairs and continuing his performance there, before being joined by Bieber. Video director Rory Kramer released several images of the production on Instagram, including one showing a crane on location with a platform that enabled the camera operator to capture the video in a single take. The scenario captures the emotions in the song and what it is about.

== Commercial performance ==
The song debuted and peaked at number eight on the Billboard Hot 100, making it Mendes' sixth top 10 and Bieber's 21st in the United States. Monster also debuted in the top ten in over fifteen countries, including the UK and Australia. Elsewhere, the song debuted at number one in Denmark and Canada, making it Mendes's second number one single and Bieber's 11th in the latter.

== Live performances ==
Bieber and Mendes performed the song for the first time at the American Music Awards of 2020 on November 22, 2020.

== Credits and personnel ==
Credits adapted from Tidal.

- Justin Bieber – songwriting
- Shawn Mendes – songwriting
- Frank Dukes – production, songwriting, record engineering
- Kaan Gunesberk – additional production
- Matthew Tavares – additional production
- Daniel Caesar – songwriting
- Mustafa the Poet – songwriting
- Chris Galland – mixing assistance
- Jeremie Inhaber – mixing assistance
- Robin Florent – mix engineering
- Manny Marroquin – mixing
- George Seara – record engineering
- Josh Gudwin – record engineering, vocal production

== Charts ==
=== Weekly charts ===
Chart (2020–2021)	Peak position
Argentina Hot 100 (Billboard)	87
Australia (ARIA)	7
Austria (Ö3 Austria Top 40)	2
Belgium (Ultratop 50 Flanders)	35
Belgium (Ultratop 50 Wallonia)	37
Canada Hot 100 (Billboard)	1
Canada AC (Billboard)	6
Canada CHR/Top 40 (Billboard)	5
Canada Hot AC (Billboard)	5
Colombia (National-Report)	100
Czech Republic Airplay (ČNS IFPI)	86
Czech Republic Singles Digital (ČNS IFPI)	6
Denmark (Tracklisten)	1
France (SNEP)	75
Germany (GfK)	6
Global 200 (Billboard)	4
Greece (IFPI)	6
Hungary (Single Top 40)	4
Hungary (Stream Top 40)	4
Iceland (Tónlistinn)	18
Ireland (IRMA)	10
Italy (FIMI)	36
Japan Hot 100 (Billboard)	93
Malaysia (RIM)	7
Mexico (Billboard Mexican Airplay)	18
Netherlands (Dutch Top 40)	11
Netherlands (Single Top 100)	8
New Zealand (Recorded Music NZ)	8
Norway (VG-lista)	4
Peru (UNIMPRO)	52
Poland Airplay (ZPAV)	26
Portugal (AFP)	6
Portugal Airplay (AFP)	19
Romania (Airplay 100)	20
San Marino (SMRRTV Top 50)	44
Scotland Singles (Official Charts)	8
Singapore (RIAS)	4
Slovakia Airplay (ČNS IFPI)	42
Slovakia Singles Digital (ČNS IFPI)	5
Slovenia (SloTop50)	32
Spain (PROMUSICAE)	41
Sweden (Sverigetopplistan)	9
Switzerland (Schweizer Hitparade)	2
UK Singles (Official Charts)	9
US Billboard Hot 100	8
US Adult Pop Airplay (Billboard)	15
US Pop Airplay (Billboard)	18

=== Year-end charts ===
Chart (2021)	Position
Canada (Canadian Hot 100)	15
Denmark (Tracklisten)	88
Global 200 (Billboard)	121
Portugal (AFP)	88

== Certifications ==
Region	Certification	Certified units/sales
Australia (ARIA)	2× Platinum	140,000^{‡}
Austria (IFPI Austria)	Gold	15,000^{‡}
Brazil (Pro-Música Brasil)	2× Diamond	320,000^{‡}
Canada (Music Canada)	3× Platinum	240,000^{‡}
Denmark (IFPI Danmark)	Platinum	90,000^{‡}
France (SNEP)	Gold	100,000^{‡}
Italy (FIMI)	Gold	35,000^{‡}
New Zealand (RMNZ)	2× Platinum	60,000^{‡}
Norway (IFPI Norway)	Gold	30,000^{‡}
Poland (ZPAV)	Platinum	50,000^{‡}
Portugal (AFP)	Platinum	10,000^{‡}
Spain (Promusicae)	Gold	30,000^{‡}
United Kingdom (BPI)	Gold	400,000^{‡}
United States (RIAA)	Platinum	1,000,000^{‡}
^{‡} Sales+streaming figures based on certification alone.

== Release history ==
Release dates and formats for "Monster"
Region	Date	Format(s)	Label(s)	Ref.
Various	November 20, 2020	CD single; digital download; streaming	Island; Def Jam	
Italy	November 20, 2020	Radio airplay	Universal	
United States	November 24, 2020	Contemporary hit radio	Island; Republic	
