= Wonder (Shawn Mendes song) =

2020 single by Shawn Mendes

Single by Shawn Mendes

from the album Wonder
- Released: October 2, 2020
- Genre: Electronica; pop; rock
- Length: 2:53
- Label: Island
- Songwriters: Shawn Mendes; Scott Harris; Thomas Hull; Nate Mercereau
- Producers: Mendes; Mercereau; Kid Harpoon

Shawn Mendes singles chronology
| "Lover (Remix)" (2019) | "Wonder" (2020) | "Monster" (2020) |

Music video
- "Wonder" on YouTube

"Wonder" is a song by Canadian singer Shawn Mendes from his fourth studio album of the same name. The song, which serves as the album's lead single, was released on October 2, 2020, by Island Records. The track was written and produced by Mendes, Scott Harris, Nate Mercereau and Kid Harpoon. The single reached the top-ten in Canada, Hungary, and Singapore, as well as the top-twenty in twelve countries including Australia, the United Kingdom, and the United States.

== Release and promotion ==
The song and the album were first teased on September 30, 2020, on Mendes' Twitter account, where he tweeted "WHAT IS #WONDER". He followed the tweet up with a link to an interactive website, where, on a piece of paper on the floor in the interactive room, was a setlist with the word Wonder. Later on, he posted a handwritten note onto social media and confirmed that the single, as well as an accompanying music video would be released on October 2.

=== Live performances ===
On October 26, 2020, Mendes announced The Wonder Residency, a series of performances from different theaters & venues performing songs from the album. On October 27, 2020, Mendes performed the song as part of a medley on The Tonight Show Starring Jimmy Fallon for the first time. On October 29, Mendes performed an acoustic version of the song on Global Citizen: EveryVoteCounts/2020. On November 10, Mendes performed the song on BBC Radio 1's Live Lounge. On November 13, he performed the track as part of BBC's Children In Need show. On November 22, Mendes performed the song at the American Music Awards of 2020. On December 6, Mendes performed the song on "Live From Wonder: The Experience".

== Composition ==
The song has been described as a power ballad. Lyrically, the song sees Mendes contemplating "imagined scenarios", as well as "stepping foot into his friend's shoes". The singer also comments on toxic masculinity, singing "I wonder, when I cry into my hands, I'm conditioned to feel like it makes me less of a man". "Wonder" finds Mendes "broadening his sonic horizons — experimenting with a widescreen, full-bodied sound".

== Accolades ==
Awards and nominations for "Wonder"
| Year | Organization | Award | Result | Ref(s) |
|---|---|---|---|---|
| 2021 | MTV Video Music Awards | Best Pop | Nominated | |

== Music video ==
The music video premiered on Mendes' Vevo channel on October 2, 2020, at midnight Eastern Time. The video was directed by Matty Peacock.

=== Synopsis ===
The music video starts with a scene that shows Mendes sitting on a train by himself, looking outside the window. He then stands from his seat and makes his way to the top of the train. The train ride was compared to the scenes on the Hogwarts Express during the Harry Potter series. The next scene immediately cuts to Mendes in a forest, where he begins to run towards the edge of the forest, where there is a cliff. As he sings, it begins to rain and Mendes is seen singing at the top of his lungs. The video closes out with Mendes kneeling on top of the cliff whilst the rain stops.

=== Lyric video ===
A lyric video was also released to Mendes' Vevo channel on October 5, 2020.

== Commercial performance ==
"Wonder" debuted and peaked at number 18 on the Billboard Hot 100 on October 12, 2020. It debuted at number 4 on the Canadian Hot 100. The song also charted in various European countries.

== Credits and personnel ==
Credits adapted from Tidal.

- Shawn Mendes – vocals, songwriting, production, composition, piano, synthesizer
- Scott Harris – songwriting, production, composition
- Nate Mercereau – songwriting, additional production, composition, guitar, horn, drums
- Kid Harpoon – songwriting, production, composition, guitar, drums, programming, synthesizer
- Michael Lehmann Boddicker – engineering
- Edie Lehmann Boddicker – additional vocals, choir arrangement
- George Seara – vocal engineering
- Jeremy Hatcher – vocal engineering
- Mike Stent – mixing
- Kaushlesh "Garry" Purohit – vocal engineering
- Clydene Jackson – additional vocals
- Jarrett Johnson – additional vocals
- Nayanna Holley – additional vocals
- Toni Scruggs – additional vocals

== Charts ==
=== Weekly charts ===
Weekly chart performance for "Wonder"
| Chart (2020) | Peak position |
|---|---|
| Argentina Hot 100 (Billboard) | 70 |
| Australia (ARIA) | 13 |
| Austria (Ö3 Austria Top 40) | 21 |
| Belgium (Ultratop 50 Flanders) | 17 |
| Belgium (Ultratop 50 Wallonia) | 17 |
| Canada Hot 100 (Billboard) | 4 |
| Czech Republic Singles Digital (ČNS IFPI) | 17 |
| Czech Republic Airplay (ČNS IFPI) | 12 |
| Denmark (Tracklisten) | 28 |
| Finland (Radiosoittolista) | 76 |
| France (SNEP) | 200 |
| Germany (GfK) | 47 |
| Global 200 (Billboard) | 13 |
| Hungary (Single Top 40) | 7 |
| Hungary (Stream Top 40) | 9 |
| Iceland (Tónlistinn) | 34 |
| Ireland (IRMA) | 15 |
| Italy (FIMI) | 86 |
| Malaysia (RIM) | 13 |
| Mexico Airplay (Billboard) | 31 |
| Netherlands (Dutch Top 40) | 15 |
| Netherlands (Single Top 100) | 20 |
| New Zealand (Recorded Music NZ) | 19 |
| Norway (VG-lista) | 16 |
| Portugal (AFP) | 30 |
| San Marino (SMRRTV Top 50) | 26 |
| Scottish Singles Sales (Official Charts) | 18 |
| Singapore (RIAS) | 9 |
| Slovakia Airplay (ČNS IFPI) | 48 |
| Slovakia Singles Digital (ČNS IFPI) | 37 |
| Slovenia (SloTop50) | 37 |
| Spain (PROMUSICAE) | 84 |
| Switzerland (Schweizer Hitparade) | 19 |
| UK Singles (Official Charts) | 20 |
| US Billboard Hot 100 | 18 |
| US Adult Contemporary (Billboard) | 17 |
| US Adult Pop Airplay (Billboard) | 9 |
| US Pop Airplay (Billboard) | 14 |

=== Year-end charts ===
2020 year-end chart performance for "Wonder"
| Chart (2020) | Position |
|---|---|
| Hungary (Stream Top 40) | 80 |
| Netherlands (Dutch Top 40) | 76 |

2021 year-end chart performance for "Wonder"
| Chart (2021) | Position |
|---|---|
| Belgium (Ultratop Flanders) | 92 |
| Canada (Canadian Hot 100) | 64 |

== Certifications ==
Certifications for "Wonder"
| Region | Certification | Certified units/sales |
|---|---|---|
| Australia (ARIA) | 3× Platinum | 210,000^{‡} |
| Austria (IFPI Austria) | Platinum | 30,000^{‡} |
| Belgium (BRMA) | Gold | 20,000^{‡} |
| Brazil (Pro-Música Brasil) | 3× Platinum | 120,000^{‡} |
| Canada (Music Canada) | 3× Platinum | 240,000^{‡} |
| Denmark (IFPI Danmark) | Gold | 45,000^{‡} |
| Italy (FIMI) | Gold | 35,000^{‡} |
| New Zealand (RMNZ) | 2× Platinum | 60,000^{‡} |
| Poland (ZPAV) | Platinum | 50,000^{‡} |
| Portugal (AFP) | Gold | 5,000^{‡} |
| Spain (Promusicae) | Gold | 30,000^{‡} |
| United Kingdom (BPI) | Gold | 400,000^{‡} |
| United States (RIAA) | Platinum | 1,000,000^{‡} |
^{‡} Sales+streaming figures based on certification alone.

== Release history ==
Release history for "Wonder"
| Region | Date | Format(s) | Label(s) | Ref. |
|---|---|---|---|---|
| Various | October 2, 2020 | CD single; digital download; streaming | Island | |
| Australia | October 2, 2020 | Contemporary hit radio | Island; UMA | |
| Italy | October 2, 2020 | Contemporary hit radio | UMG | |
| United Kingdom | October 2, 2020 | Contemporary hit radio | UMG | |
| United States | October 6, 2020 | Contemporary hit radio | Island; Republic | |
| United States | October 6, 2020 | Hot adult contemporary | Island; Republic | |
