= The Kentucky Gentlemen =

Country music duo

- Origin: Nashville
- Genres: Country; R&B; pop
- Label: River House Artists
- Members: Derek Campbell; Brandon Campbell
- Website: thekygentlemen.com

The Kentucky Gentlemen is a Nashville country music duo consisting of twin brothers Derek and Brandon Campbell. Their music incorporates elements from country, pop, and R&B. Billboard described their style as "a potent blend of pop, country and R&B, built around tightly-fused, unmistakable blood harmonies."

== Early life ==
Derek and Brandon were born and raised in Versailles, Kentucky. Their early musical experiences included singing in the church choir and performing to keyboard beats with their older brother. After attending college in different states, the two decided to pursue a career in music together and moved to Nashville.

== Musical career ==
The Kentucky Gentlemen released an E.P., The Kentucky Gentlemen: Vol. 1, in July 2022. Rolling Stone called the E.P.'s single "Whatever You're Up For" "a song you need to know" and "the most compelling commercial-country slow jam of the year."

In 2023, NPR called them an "artist to watch."

The duo released their first full-length album, Rhinestone Revolution, in June 2025 via River House Artists.

They have received an artist grant from the Color Me Country artist grant fund, a grant launched by singer-songwriter Rissi Palmer, with a mission of "support[ing] the underrepresented voices of BIPOC artists in country music that, for too long, have lived outside the spotlight and off the airwaves."

== Discography ==
- Rhinestone Revolution (2025).
