= Greenskeepers =

American indie rock/new wave band

Greenskeepers are an indie rock/new wave band from Chicago. Their song "Lotion" is a tribute to the character Buffalo Bill, the fictional serial killer featured in the 1991 film The Silence of the Lambs. "Lotion" also came in at #90 in the 2004 Triple J Hottest 100. Their track "Low & Sweet" was listed in British DJ John Peel's 2001 Festive Fifty. Their song "Vagabond" has been featured in the popular video game Grand Theft Auto IV on the in-game radio station "Radio Broker".

== Biography ==
Greenskeepers was founded in 1999 by childhood friends James Curd and Nick Maurer. Their first release was "Whats Your Man Got To Do With Gan" on Classic Records. The standout song on the EP was "Low and Sweet", which was voted into the 2001 Festive Fifty at #24 by listeners of the British DJ John Peel.

In early 2001, Maurer and Curd went in the studio together to record the single "Should I Sing Like This?", which became an international club hit. After its success, Maurer moved to Germany and Curd collaborated with many other artists who shared his love of electronic music. This included keyboardist/producer Mark Share, who had three of his songs featured on the Greenskeepers' debut album, The Ziggy Franklin Radio Show. Maurer became a full member in 2004 and Mark Share brought his bassist and lifelong friend Coban Rudish on board.

The four went in the studio to work on their second album Pleetch, recorded at Studio 11 and released by Classic records in the U.K and Om Records in the United States. It featured guest vocalists and included Maurer on two of the songs that he created with the new band on a week long studio trip to his native Chicago. Pleetch was well-received across the music world.

They performed Scotland and Jerusalem and Los Angeles as a three piece band during 2004. Maurer then moved back to Chicago to rejoin the Greenskeepers and debuted the full four-piece band at a Miami music conference in 2005. Billboard called it the standout performance of the conference.

The Greenskeepers then began working in the studio again, resulting in the two-disc album Polo Club, released on Om Records. The album met with enthusiastic reviews and full marks in magazines around the world. Their version of a Huey Lewis and the News hit song, "I Want A New Drug," which pays overt homage to Nine Inch Nails' song "Closer", was featured in the film What Happens in Vegas.

The band began touring again at Park life in Australia, T In the Park in Scotland, Fabric in London, Avalon in Los Angeles, Electric Daisy in Ireland and SXSW in Austin, TX.

Beginning in 2008, the Greenskeepers name was used to represent Curd as a solo artist and his collaborations with other musicians.

Their song "Live Like You Wanna Live" is used in the soundtrack to the video game Need For Speed: Hot Pursuit.

== Members ==
- James Curd - Electro-percussionist
- Nick Maurer - Vocalist
- Coban Rudish - Bassist
- Mark Share - Keyboards
