= The Black Bar Mitzvah =

Mixtape by Rick Ross
- Released: October 8, 2012
- Recorded: 2012
- Genre: Hip hop
- Labels: Maybach Music Group, Def Jam, Warner Bros. Records
- Producers: Kenoe, Got Koke, Young Chop, Lifted, Sonny Digital, Jahlil Beats, Hit-Boy, Pharrell Williams, Young Shun, Detail, Mike WiLL Made It, Will-A-Fool, Reefa, Morris Brothers

Rick Ross chronology
| Rich Forever (2012) | The Black Bar Mitzvah (2012) | Black Dollar (2015) |

The Black Bar Mitzvah is the third mixtape by American rapper Rick Ross, it was released on October 8, 2012. The mixtape features guest appearances from Rockie Fresh, Drake, Lil Reese, Diddy, Gunplay, 2 Chainz, Pharrell, and Whole Slab.

== Reception ==
=== Controversy ===
Rick Ross canceled his MMG Tour after a gang named Gangster Disciples put a series of YouTube videos threatening the Southern rapper. Various sects of the Gangster Disciples (GDs), a gang founded on the South Side of Chicago, appear in videos on YouTube threatening Ross and demanding money. A nearly 10-minute video published featuring members of the North Carolina crew is titled "Rick Ross In Trouble with the GD's North Carolina."

The reason for the gang feud with Ross, comes from the Black Bar Mitzvah mixtape cover. The cover features Rick Ross surrounded by the Star Of David, they felt it disrespected Gangster Disciples' leader Larry Hoover. The Star Of David is the symbol used by the Gangster Disciples. They claim to have already given Ross a pass "for using our honorable chairman's name in a disorderly fashion fashion in Ross' song "B.M.F. (Blowin' Money Fast)". Others have said it is not about Hoover. The GDs also appear to be upset that Ross has been acting like more of a gangster than he really is. Affiliated groups, such as ones in Florida and Georgia, have made their displeasure known on YouTube and demanded money. At the same time the album cover was named the twelfth best cover of 2012 by Complex Magazine.

=== Critical response ===
Professional ratings
Review scores
| Source | Rating |
|---|---|
| BET | 3/5 stars |
| Rolling Stone | 3/5 stars |

The Black Bar Mitzvah was met with generally mixed reviews from music critics. Jon Dolan of Rolling Stone gave the mixtape three out of five stars, saying "The Black Bar Mitzvah is a perfect title for a Rick Ross mixtape: his vision of playalistic splendor has always been the stuff of thirteen-year-old boy fantasy. "My new home look like it’s Al Capone/My new bitch look like she in En Vogue," he raps over swirling strings and blinding-bright hi-hats on "Us," featuring Drake. Ross stomps triumphally over hits like Kanye's "Mercy" and "Birthday" by 2 Chainz, hates on Mitt Romney, and even recaps his recent micro-brawl with Young Jeezy at the BET Hip-Hop Awards: "Let me get back to my bitches 'cause you bitch niggas ain't nothing"– even when reality creeps in, he still sounds like a superhero."

Calvin Stovall of BET gave the mixtape three out of five stars, saying "The Black Bar Mitzvah plays like every run-of-the-mill, jacking-for-beats tape we’ve heard. As novel as it is to hear Ross and his MMG fam lace some of the day's hardest bangers, it's not enough to keep anyone's attention in a game where hungry MCs are putting some of their best original content onto mixtapes. He raised the bar himself, so he has only himself to blame, but Ross’ performance isn't a complete disappointment. It's great to hear him on underrated Southern bangers like "Gone to the Moon," "Bands" and "Us," where Ross proves that his flow is still top notch. But stale remixes of G.O.O.D Music hits "Clique" and "Mercy" only exist to introduce MMG's newest pick-up, Rockie Fresh. That's fair enough, considering it seems like the greater purpose of the entire tape was to promote upcoming projects from Meek Mill and Gunplay, but Ross owes listeners more than this head-scratcher."

== Track listing ==
| No. | Title | Original Instrumental | Length |
|---|---|---|---|
| 1. | "Intro" | "Pirates" (Rick Ross) | 3:12 |
| 2. | "Don't Like" | "I Don't Like" (Remix) (Chief Keef, Kanye West, Pusha T, Big Sean, & Jadakiss) | 5:30 |
| 3. | "Mercy" (featuring Rockie Fresh) | "Mercy" (Kanye West featuring Big Sean, Pusha T & 2 Chainz) | 5:24 |
| 4. | "Us" (featuring Drake & Lil Reese) | "Us" (Lil Reese) | 6:06 |
| 5. | "Rosenberg Skit" | | 1:09 |
| 6. | "Birthday" (featuring Diddy) | "Birthday Song" (2 Chainz featuring Kanye West) | 7:37 |
| 7. | "Burn" | "Burn" (Meek Mill featuring Big Sean) | 5:35 |
| 8. | "Clique" (featuring Gunplay & Rockie Fresh) | "Clique" (Big Sean & Kanye West featuring Jay-Z) | 6:41 |
| 9. | "911" (featuring 2 Chainz) | "911" (Rick Ross) | 5:28 |
| 10. | "No Worries" | "No Worries" (Lil Wayne featuring Detail) | 3:13 |
| 11. | "Thumbin'" | "Thumb Thru That Check" (Rocko featuring Young Scooter) | 3:59 |
| 12. | "Presidential (Remix)" (featuring Pharrell & Rockie Fresh) | "Presidential" (Rick Ross featuring Elijah Blake) | 5:20 |
| 13. | "Bands" (featuring Whole Slab) | "Bandz a Make Her Dance" (Juicy J featuring Lil Wayne & 2 Chainz) | 4:53 |
| 14. | "Gone To The Moon" | "Gone To The Moon" (Future) | 2:05 |
| 15. | "Itchin'" | "Itchin'" (DJ Infamous featuring Future) | 2:25 |

Bonus Tracks
| No. | Title | Producer(s) | Length |
|---|---|---|---|
| 16. | "Ice Cold" (featuring Omarion) | Reefa | 3:51 |
| 17. | "Bible On The Dash" (Gunplay) | Morris Brothers | 2:48 |
| 18. | "Young & Gettin' It" (Meek Mill featuring Kirko Bangz) | Jahlil Beats | 3:27 |
