= Austin Martin =

American baseball player (born 1999)

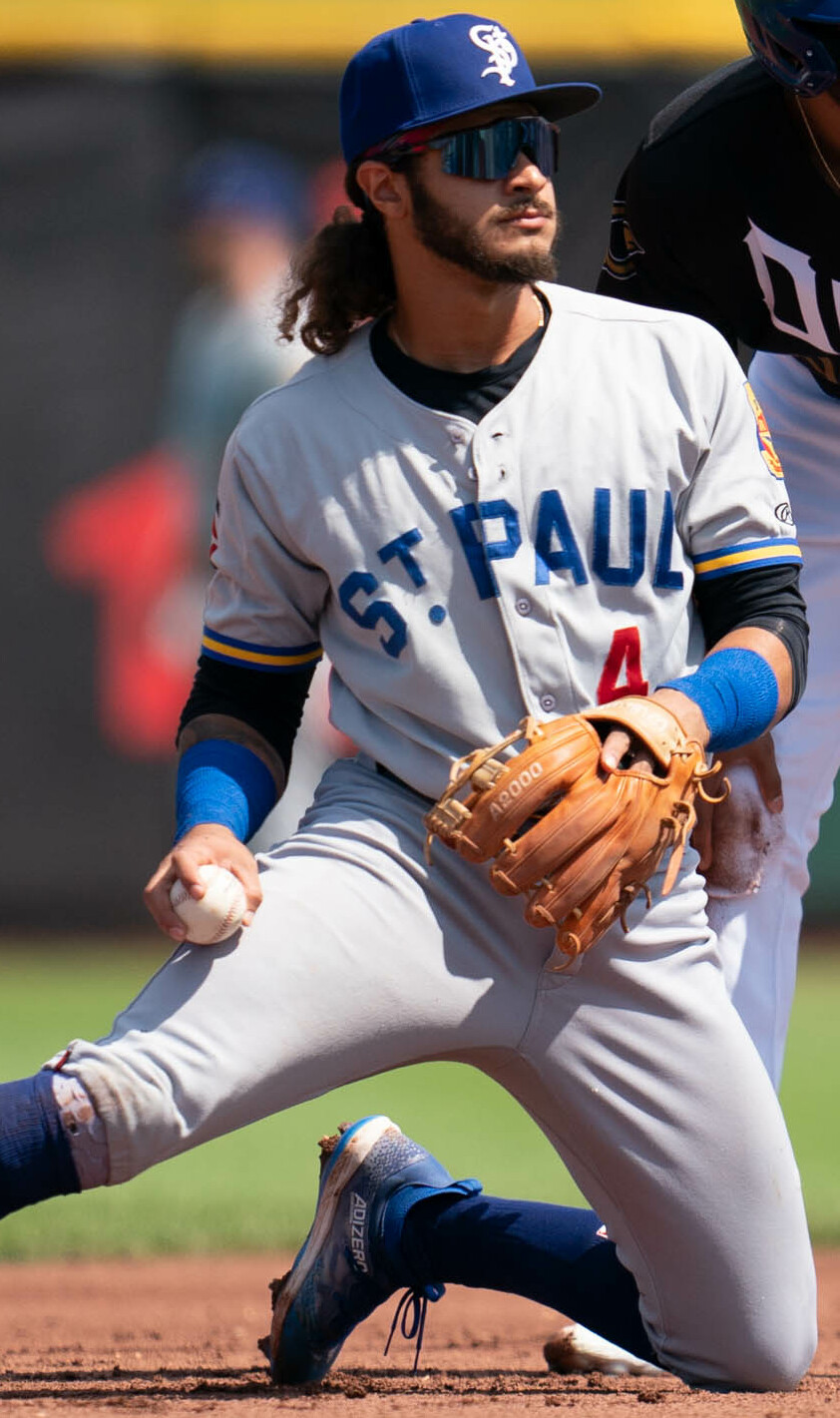
- Martin with the St. Paul Saints in 2023

Minnesota Twins – No. 16
- Outfielder
- Born: March 23, 1999 (age 27); DeLand, Florida, U.S.
- Bats: Right Throws: Right

MLB debut
- March 30, 2024, for the Minnesota Twins

MLB statistics (through 2026 season)
- Batting average: .249
- Home runs: 5
- Runs batted in: 47
- Stats at Baseball Reference

Teams
- Minnesota Twins (2024–present)
Medals
Men's baseball
Representing United States
15U Baseball World Cup
Silver medal – second place	2014 Mazatlán	Team

Christopher Austin Martin (born March 23, 1999) is an American professional baseball outfielder for the Minnesota Twins of Major League Baseball (MLB). He played college baseball for the Vanderbilt Commodores.

== Amateur career ==
Martin attended Trinity Christian Academy in Jacksonville, Florida. In 2014, he was selected to the 15U United States national baseball team. Martin was drafted by the Cleveland Indians in the 37th round of the 2017 Major League Baseball draft, but did not sign and instead attended Vanderbilt University where he played college baseball for the Vanderbilt Commodores.

As a freshman in 2018, Martin started 58 games at six different positions. He hit .338/.452/.414 with one home run, 19 runs batted in and 22 stolen bases. He played mostly third base his sophomore year in 2019. In 65 games, he hit .410/.503/.619 with eight home runs and 42 runs batted in, and helped lead Vanderbilt to victory in the 2019 College World Series against the Michigan Wolverines. His .410 average led the Southeastern Conference. After the season, he played for the United States collegiate national team. Before the suspension of his junior season due to the COVID-19 pandemic, Martin had appeared in 16 games and hit .377 with three home runs and 11 runs batted in.

== Professional career ==
=== Toronto Blue Jays ===
Martin was considered by MLB.com to be the "best pure hitter" and a top prospect in the 2020 Major League Baseball draft, projecting as a top three with potential to be drafted first overall. He was selected fifth overall by the Toronto Blue Jays and was announced as a shortstop. He received a $7 million signing bonus.

Martin made his professional debut in 2021 with the New Hampshire Fisher Cats of the Double-A Northeast. In June, he was selected to play in the All-Star Futures Game. Over 56 games with New Hampshire, Martin slashed .281/.424/.383 with two home runs, 16 runs batted in, and nine stolen bases.

=== Minnesota Twins ===
On July 30, 2021, Martin was traded to the Minnesota Twins along with Simeon Woods Richardson for José Berríos. Martin was assigned to the Wichita Wind Surge of the Double-A Central with whom he finished the season. Over 37 games, he batted .254 with three home runs and 19 runs batted in. Martin spent the 2022 season with Double-A Wichita, playing in 90 games and hitting .241/.367/.316 with 2 home runs, 32 runs batted in, and 34 stolen bases.

On March 5, 2023, Martin was shut down with a sprain of the ulnar collateral ligament in his right elbow. He still managed to play in 59 games for the Triple–A St. Paul Saints, batting .263/.387/.405 with 6 home runs, 28 RBI, and 16 stolen bases.

On November 14, 2023, the Twins added Martin to their 40-man roster to protect him from the Rule 5 draft. He was optioned to Triple–A St. Paul to begin the 2024 season. On March 30, 2024, Martin was promoted to the major leagues for the first time following an injury to Royce Lewis. He made his major league debut the next day on March 31. In 93 appearances for Minnesota during his rookie campaign, Martin slashed .253/.318/.352 with one home run, 16 RBI, and seven stolen bases.

Martin was optioned to Triple-A St. Paul to begin the 2025 season. After having spent much of the season on the injured list with St. Paul, Martin was recalled to the Twins on August 1.
