= Andrew Gertler =

American talent manager

- Born: November 8, 1988 (age 38); Chicago, Illinois, United States
- Occupation: Talent manager
- Years active: 2009-present
- Employer(s): Andrew Gertler Artists, LLC
- Known for: Manager of Rockie Fresh, Shawn Mendes

Andrew Gertler (born November 8, 1988) is an American talent manager that manages Rick Ross's Maybach Music Group / Atlantic Records recording artist Rockie Fresh and Island Records recording artist Shawn Mendes. He also manages Lauren Spencer-Smith and JP Saxe. Gertler was named one of Forbes' "30 Under 30" in Music in 2016 and is credited with discovering Mendes in January 2014.

== Career ==
After graduating from Homewood-Flossmoor High School, Gertler began his career in music as a 19-year-old intern at Atlantic Records. He then went on to work in Warner Music Group's direct-to-consumer division while also co-managing hip-hop artist and fellow H-F Alumni, Rockie Fresh. In 2012, Gertler signed Rockie Fresh to Rick Ross's Maybach Music Group / Atlantic Records imprint.

In 2014, Gertler discovered Shawn Mendes online and subsequently became his manager after flying him out to New York to record & meet with Island Records. With Shawn Mendes & Rockie Fresh as clients, he founded the management company AG Artists (Andrew Gertler Artists, LLC).

Gertler is credited with leading the campaign for Mendes' debut single "Life Of The Party", which sold over 148,000 copies in its first week and has since been certified Gold by the RIAA. The single made Mendes the youngest ever artist to break into the Billboard Hot 100's Top 25 with a debut single. Gertler also is credited with developing the campaign behind Shawn's first studio album Handwritten which topped the Billboard 200 at number one, making Mendes, at the age of 16, the youngest artist to do so since Justin Bieber released his album My World 2.0 in 2010.

== In media ==
Gertler was named on Forbes' "30 Under 30" list in Music for 2016 and was credited by Inc. Magazine as one of the "20 Young Entrepreneurs You Need To Know In 2016".
