= Rockie Fresh =

American rapper (born 1991)

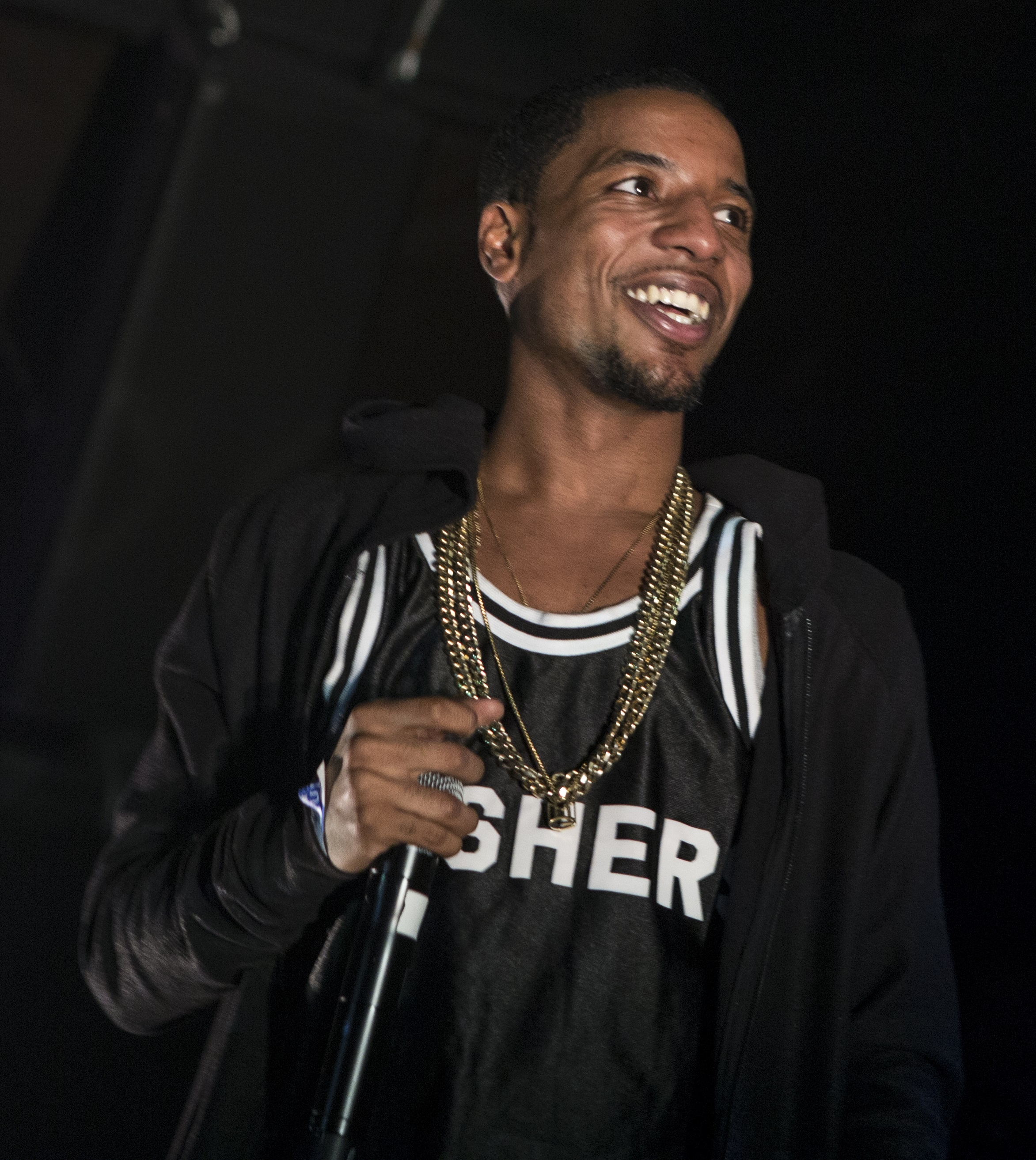
- Rockie Fresh performing in 2014

Background information
- Born: Donald Howard Pullen; April 16, 1991 (age 35); Chicago, Illinois, U.S.
- Genres: Midwestern hip-hop
- Occupations: Rapper; singer; songwriter
- Years active: 2009–present
- Labels: Chatham; Rostrum; Maybach; Atlantic
- Website: rockiefresh.com

Donald Howard Pullen (born April 16, 1991), known professionally as Rockie Fresh, is an American rapper. He was signed to Rick Ross' Maybach Music Group and Atlantic Records. Pullen is known for his alternative-influenced style of hip-hop, and his associations with recording artists Patrick Stump of Fall Out Boy, and Joel & Benji Madden of Good Charlotte.

== Career ==
In 2009, Rockie began recording his debut mixtape Rockie's Modern Life in a small recording studio in Chicago, Illinois. During the recording process, he met Andrew Koenig & Andrew Gertler, who began to manage him. The trio released Rockie's Modern Life in December 2009, and followed it up with another mixtape, The Otherside, recorded at Studio 11 in December 2010.

The success of the projects earned Rockie widespread acclaim from hip-hop blogs and publications, and performances across the country including one at Bamboozle Festival, where he met Josh Madden, who would later introduce Rockie to his brothers Joel & Benji Madden of Good Charlotte. Rockie's music also grabbed the attention of Fall Out Boy lead-singer Patrick Stump, whom Rockie has cited as a major influence and has since toured with.

Since the release of The Otherside Rockie has been named one of Metromix's "25 Hottest Artists Under 25" and his music has been featured on The CW's nationally syndicated television show Nikita. He was also featured on Good Charlotte's project The Madden Brothers: Before The Fame according to Rolling Stone and Billboard magazines.

In 2012, Rockie released his mixtape Driving 88, which led to his signing with Rick Ross' Maybach Music Group on July 12 via Atlantic Records. After his signing, he released his fifth mixtape and debut Maybach Music Group project 'Electric Highway'. It features guest appearances from Lunice, Rick Ross, Nipsey Hussle, Curren$y and others. Production is handled by The Gift, Boi-1da, The Maven Boys and others. He has also since appeared on Rick Ross "The Black Bar Mitzvah" mixtape, amongst other Maybach Music Group collaborations and remixes.

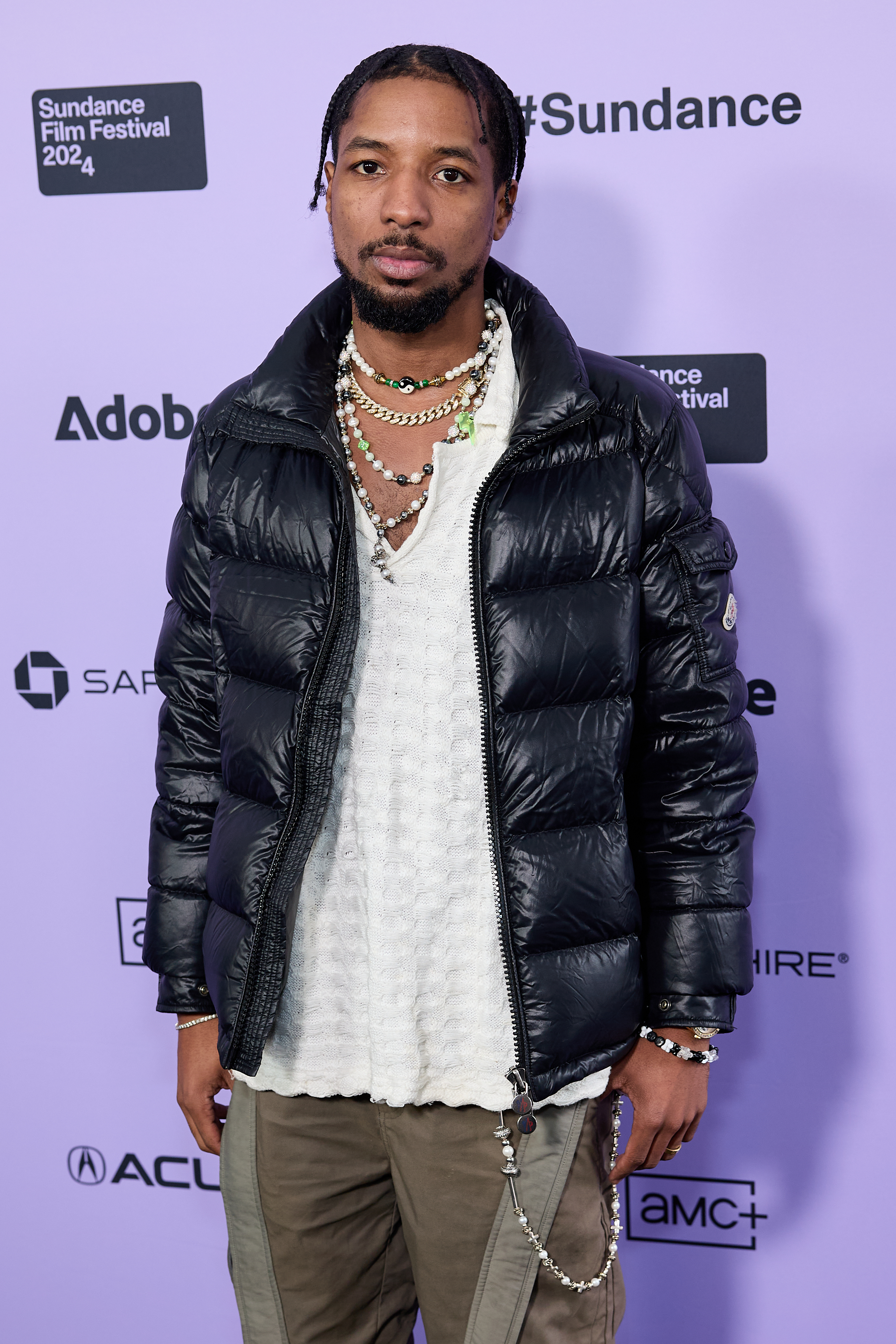
Rockie Fresh at the premiere of the documentary As We Speak during the 2024 Sundance Film Festival

On April 29, 2013, Rockie Fresh released a seven-track project in celebration of his birthday, aptly titled The Birthday Tape. Featuring vocal appearances from his fellow MMG members Rick Ross and Gunplay. Shortly thereafter, he announced an endorsement deal with shoe & apparel brand PUMA. Compilation album Self Made Vol. 3 from MMG got released on September 16, 2013. Rockie Fresh made appearances on 4 tracks on the album and on two more tracks on the Best Buy deluxe edition. On December 16, 2013, Rockie Fresh and Casey Veggies collaboration mixtape "Fresh Veggies" got released. It is presented by PUMA and released under Maybach Music Group and Peas N' Carrots International. The mixtape features vocal appearances from Overdoz, Ty Dolla $ign, Juicy J, Kirko Bangz and Hit-Boy. "Fresh Veggies" was produced by Lunice, Jahlil Beats and Hit-Boy, among others. Fresh was nominated for the 2014 XXL freshman class, but didn't make the final cut.

On October 23, 2018, Rockie Fresh announced his signing to Rostrum Records. He also released his new single "No Satisfaction" via a Billboard Magazine announcement.

== Discography ==
=== Studio albums ===
- 2019: Destination

=== Collaborative albums ===
| Title | Album details | Peak chart positions | | | |
| Title | Album details | US | US R&B | US Rap | FRA |
|---|---|---|---|---|---|
| Self Made Vol. 3 (with Maybach Music Group) | Released: September 17, 2013; Label: Maybach Music Group, Atlantic; Format: CD, digital download | 4 | 1 | 1 | 182 |
"—" denotes a title that did not chart, or was not released in that territory.

=== Mixtapes ===
List of mixtapes, with year released
| Title | Album details |
|---|---|
| Rockie's Modern Life | Released: 2009; Label: Self-released; Format: Digital download |
| The Otherside | Released: December 16, 2010; Label: Self-released; Format: Digital download |
| The Otherside Redux | Released: July 27, 2011; Label: Self-released; Format: Digital download |
| Driving 88 | Released: January 23, 2012; Label: Self-released; Format: Digital download |
| Electric Highway | Released: January 21, 2013; Label: Maybach Music Group; Format: Digital download |
| The Birthday Tape | Released: April 29, 2013; Label: Maybach Music Group; Format: Digital download |
| Fresh Veggies (with Casey Veggies) | Released: December 16, 2013; Label: Maybach Music Group, Peas N' Carrots International; Format: Digital download |
| The Night I Went To... | Released: January 21, 2016; Label: Maybach Music Group; Format: Digital download |
| The Night I Went To... Los Angeles EP | Released: March 17, 2016; Label: Maybach Music Group; Format: Digital download |
| The Night I Went To... Chicago EP | Released: March 29, 2016; Label: Maybach Music Group; Format: Digital download |
| The Night I Went To... New York EP | Released: April 7, 2016; Label: Maybach Music Group; Format: Digital download |
| Fresh Veggies 2 (with Casey Veggies) | Released: July 10, 2020; Label: Peas N' Carrots International; Format: Digital download, streaming |
| Slid Thru Just to Show You What's Up | Released: October 2, 2020; Label: self-released; Format: Digital download, streaming |
| Slid Thru Part 2 | Released: April 2, 2021; Label: self-released; Format: Digital download, streaming |

=== Singles ===
List of singles, with selected chart positions and certifications, showing year released and album name
| Title | Year | Peak chart positions | | | Album |
| Title | Year | US | US R&B | US Rap | Album |
|---|---|---|---|---|---|
| "Spotlight" | 2011 | — | — | — | —N/a |
| "You A Lie (Remix)" (featuring Rick Ross) | 2012 | — | — | — | Driving 88 |
| "God Is Great" | 2013 | — | — | — | Self Made Vol. 3 |
| "Call Me When It's Over" (featuring Chris Brown) | 2016 | — | — | — | The Night I Went To... |
| "Pray 4 Me" | 2016 | — | — | — | Electric Highway 2 |
| "No Satisfaction" | 2018 | — | — | — | —N/a |
| "Must Be" (featuring Chris Brown) | 2019 | — | — | — | Destination |

=== Guest appearances ===
List of non-single guest appearances, with other performing artists, showing year released and album name
| Title | Year | Other artist(s) | Album |
|---|---|---|---|
| "They Notice" | 2011 | Brandun DeShay | All Day DeShay: AM |
| "Take Me Back to Teenage Crime" | 2011 | The Madden Brothers | Before — Volume One |
| "The Right Track (So Cold)" | 2011 | The Madden Brothers | Before — Volume One |
| "Miserable At Best" | 2011 | Cardo, Gerald Walker | On Your Side |
| "Shit I Know" | 2012 | Tayyib Ali | Keystone State Of Mind 2 |
| "King Me" | 2012 | Noelz Vedere, Vic Mensa | The Popular Kid |
| "Fresh Air" | 2012 | Probcause, Diggs Duke | The Recipe Vol.1 |
| "Insane" | 2012 | YP | Sleep Walking |
| "Can't Hide It" | 2012 | Sir Michael Rocks | Lap Of Lux |
| "Mercy" | 2012 | Rick Ross | The Black Bar Mitzvah |
| "Presidential" (Remix) | 2012 | Rick Ross, Pharrell | The Black Bar Mitzvah |
| "Clique" | 2012 | Rick Ross, Gunplay | The Black Bar Mitzvah and Cops & Robbers |
| "Smoke Something" | 2013 | YP | Wide Awake |
| "Back Down" | 2013 | The Midi Mafia | Get Connected Brand X |
| "Energy" | 2013 | Casey Veggies | —N/a |
| "M.I.A." (Remix) | 2013 | Omarion, Rick Ross, French Montana | —N/a |
| "Gee Whiz" | 2013 | J'Lynn | UnderClassmen |
| "Hail To The King" | 2013 | Winners Circle | Winners Circle |
| "Somewhere In America"(Remix) | 2013 | Hit-Boy | —N/a |
| "Fuck Em all" | 2013 | Giftz, King Louie | Position of Power |
| "Time Is Money" | 2013 | Vic Mensa | Innanetape |
| "Keep It 100" | 2013 | Sasha Go Hard | Nutty World |
| "My Story (Chicago Remix)" | 2013 | R. Kelly, Katie Got Bandz | —N/a |
| "Been On (Remix)" | 2014 | G-Eazy, Tory Lanez | —N/a |
| "Fresh" | 2014 | Fat Trel | Gleesh |
| "Too Real For This" | 2014 | Dizzy Wright | State of Mind |
| "Makin Moves" | 2014 | RZA | Only One Place To Get It |
| "Finals 2" | 2014 | Rick Ross, Wale, Gunplay, Fat Trel, Tracy T, French Montana | —N/a |
| "We Run It" | 2014 | The Hood Internet | Out Of The Ordinary |
| "Thousand Times" | 2014 | Rich The Kid, Stalley | Feels Good To Be Rich |
| "Goodnight To The Bad Guy" | 2014 | Boaz | Real Name, No Gimmicks |
| "ESTATE" | 2014 | Martin $ky | EVERYWHERE BUT HERE EP |
| "Imagine" | 2019 | Zak Downtown, JoeCat | —N/a |

=== Music videos ===
==== As lead artist ====
List of music videos, with directors, showing year released
| Title | Year | Director(s) |
|---|---|---|
| "Living" (featuring Naledge & Phil Ade) | 2011 | Davy Greenberg |
| "A.C. Green" | 2011 | Davy Greenberg |
| "Sofa King Cole [Redux]" | 2011 | —N/a |
| "Ducking N Dodgin" (with Casey Veggies) | 2011 | Justin Oh |
| "No Fear" | 2011 | Davy Greenberg |
| "How We Do" (featuring King Louie) | 2012 | Elijah Alvarado |
| "Into The Future" | 2012 | Nem Perez |
| "You A Lie (Remix)" (featuring Rick Ross) | 2012 | Spiff TV & Dre Films |
| "Nobody" | 2013 | —N/a |
| "The Warnings" | 2013 | Ryan Snyder & Spiff TV |
| "Life Long" (featuring Rick Ross & Nipsey Hussle) | 2013 | Dre Films |
| "God Is Great" | 2013 | —N/a |
| "Panera Bread" (featuring Rick Ross & Lunice) | 2013 | Dre Films |
| "Celebrating Life" (with Casey Veggies) | 2013 | David Camerana |
| "What Ya Used To" (featuring Hit-Boy) | 2014 | Dre Films |

==== As featured artist ====
List of music videos, with directors, showing year released
| Title | Year | Director(s) |
|---|---|---|
| "King Me" (Noelz Vedere featuring Rockie Fresh and Vic Mensa) | 2012 | DeepEnd Imagery |
| "Insane" (YP featuring Rockie Fresh) | 2012 | GL Joe |
| "Smoke Something" (YP featuring Rockie Fresh) | 2013 | Will Gates |
| "Gee Whiz" (J'Lynn featuring Rockie Fresh) | 2013 | J'Lynn |
| "Black Grammys" (Wale featuring Meek Mill, Rockie Fresh and J. Cole) | 2014 | —N/a |
| "Been On (Remix)" (G-Eazy featuring Tory Lanez and Rockie Fresh) | 2014 | —N/a |
| "New Era" (Ruben Paz featuring Rockie Fresh) | 2017 | FicaMan Productions |
