= Atlas Genius discography =

Band discography

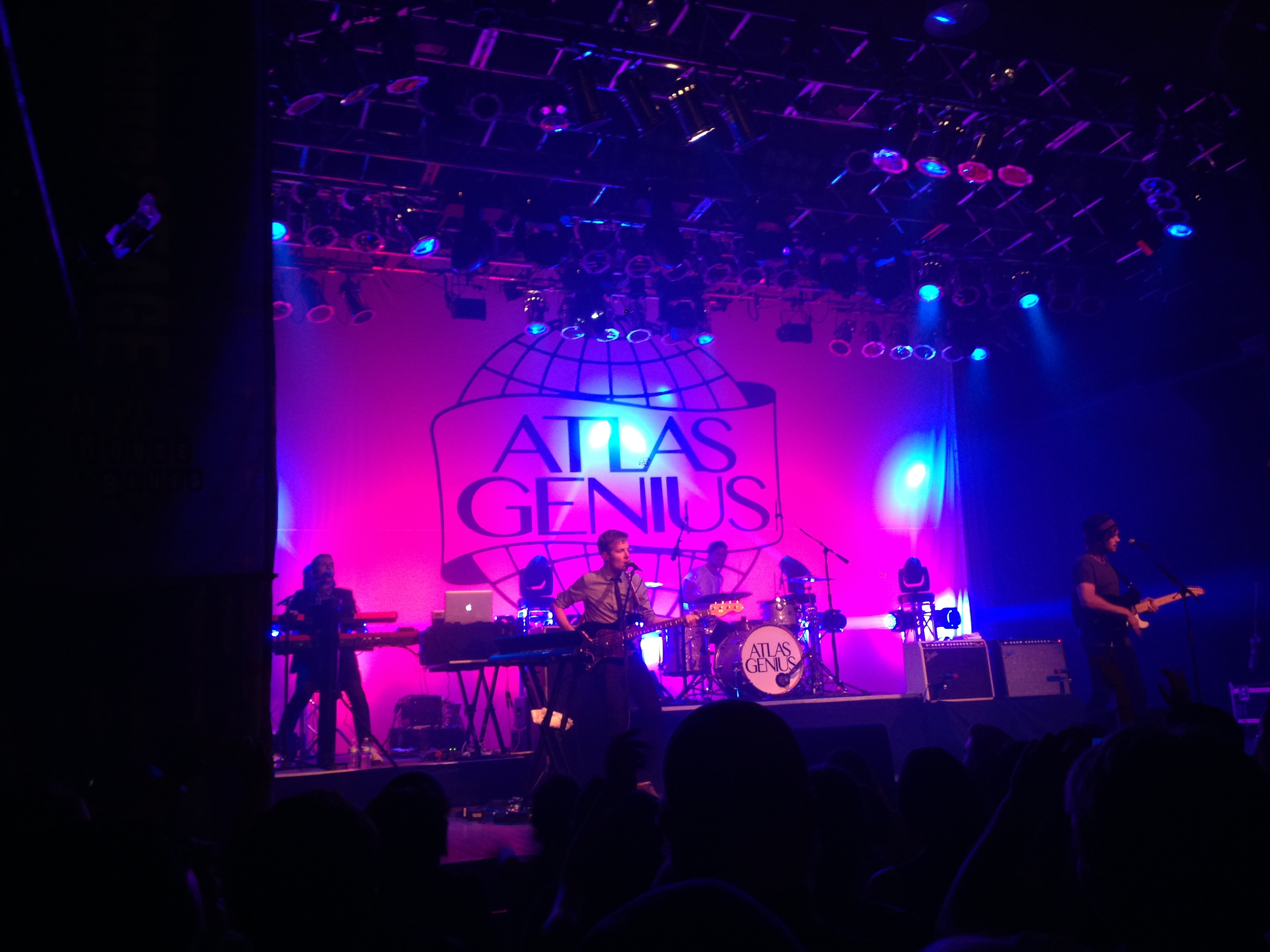
- Atlas Genius performing in Cleveland, Ohio on 2 October 2013
- Studio albums: 2
- EPs: 3
- Singles: 11
- Music videos: 8
- Remix albums: 2

The discography of Australian alternative rock band Atlas Genius consists of two studio albums, two remix albums, three extended plays, seven singles, and seven music videos.

== Albums ==
=== Studio albums ===
List of studio albums, with selected chart positions.
Title	Album details	Peak chart positions			Sales
Title	Album details	US	US Alt	US Rock	Sales
When It Was Now	Release date: 19 February 2013; Label: Warner Bros. Records; Formats: CD, LP, digital download	34	10	11	US: 79,000
Inanimate Objects	Release date: 28 August 2015; Label: Warner Bros. Records; Formats: CD, LP, digital download	150	20	28	

=== Extended plays ===
List of extended plays
Title	Album details
Through the Glass	Released: 12 June 2012; Label: Warner Bros. Records; Formats: CD, digital download
Trojans	Released: 25 February 2013 (UK); Label: Warner Bros. Records; Formats: LP
Molecules Remix EP	Released: 13 November 2015; Label: Warner Bros. Records; Formats: Digital download

=== Remix albums ===
List of remix albums
Title	Album details
So Electric: When It Was Now (The Remixes)	Released: 29 November 2013; Label: Warner Bros. Records; Formats: LP, digital download
Molecules Remix EP	Released: 13 November 2015; Label: Warner Bros. Records; Formats: Digital download

== Singles ==
List of singles, with selected chart positions, showing year released and album name.
Title	Year	Peak chart positions					Certifications	Album
Title	Year	US Alt	US Rock	CAN Alt	CAN Rock	BEL Tip	Certifications	Album
"Trojans"^{[A]}	2011	4	17	3	47	30	US: Platinum	Through the Glass / When It Was Now
"If So"	2013	8	33	—	—	—		When It Was Now
"Symptoms"	2013	—	—	—	—	—		When It Was Now
"Molecules"	2015	10	—	—	—	—		Inanimate Objects
"Stockholm"	2015	40	—	—	—	—		Inanimate Objects
"Friends with Enemies"	2015	—	—	—	—	—		Inanimate Objects
"A Perfect End"	2015	—	—	—	—	—		Inanimate Objects
"63 Days"	2017	—	—	—	—	—		End of the Tunnel
"Can't Be Alone Tonight"	2019	—	—	—	—	—		End of the Tunnel
"Elegant Strangers"	2021	—	—	—	—	—		End of the Tunnel
"Nobody Loves Like You" / "Romans"	2024	—	—	—	—	—		End of the Tunnel
"On a Wave" / "Don't Let Love Be a Stranger"	2024	—	—	—	—	—		End of the Tunnel

Notes

- A "Trojans" did not enter the Billboard Hot 100, but peaked at number 8 on the Bubbling Under Hot 100 Singles chart.

== Music videos ==
List of music videos, showing year released and director
Title	Year	Director(s)
"Back Seat"	2012	Gus Black
"Symptoms"	2012	Claire Marie Vogel
"Trojans"	2012	Claire Marie Vogel
"Centred on You"	2013	Anders Rostad
"If So"	2013	Anders Rostad
"Molecules"	2015	Claire Marie Vogel
"63 Days"	2017	Richard Rudy
"Nobody Loves Like You"	2024	

== Cover songs ==
Year	Song	Original artist	Notes
2012	"Islands"	The xx	Acoustic cover recorded at Crown City Studios.
2013	"Get Lucky"	Daft Punk featuring Pharrell Williams	Acoustic cover recorded at Giel FM3.
