= Boyhood (Music from the Motion Picture) =

Soundtrack album by various artists
- Released: July 9, 2014
- Recorded: 2000–14
- Length: 61:27
- Label: Nonesuch
- Compilers: Richard Linklater; Randall Poster

Boyhood (Music from the Motion Picture) is the soundtrack album to the 2014 film of the same name directed by Richard Linklater. The album, released on July 9, 2014 by Nonesuch Records, consists of 15 songs from popular artists recorded and released during the 2000s and early-2010s, that are compiled by Linklater and music supervisor Randall Poster. The film features more than 50 songs that are not included in the album.

== Development ==
While filming Boyhood in 2002, Linklater wanted to musically convey the emotions of the characters, by adding an orchestral score, but felt "too authorial, like adding a voiceover". Instead, he decided to use each song for the film to be "something that the characters would actually listen to, in that time, place and lives", which had to be "songs of that time". Linklater added "Music is obviously such an evocative nostalgia or memory trigger, for a place and time".

Linklater originally intended to ask the protagonists Ellar Coltrane and Lorelei Linklater, what kids at their age were listening to, but they found that their tastes were too specific for themselves and not for the characters of the play. Hence he hired a few youngsters to write narratives about songs that were about to be included in the soundtrack, as a litmus test, which he described as "fun to get educated". Linklater used the characters as touchstones for the songs, which are not soundtracked to the characters' real-life examples, especially the musical aspirations of the protagonist's father (Ethan Hawke) shaped the soundtrack. Hawke's lines directly address the accompanying music, from a scene in which he deconstructs a song from Wilco to one in which he gives his son a music CD of The Beatles songs. Linklater felt that he initially wanted to play George Harrison's "What Is Life" which he felt a bit "on-the-nose", hence, he used Paul McCartney's "Band on the Run" to capture the "eternal-ness of Beatles' music".

Most of the film's music was selected after the decade-long shooting was completed. Linklater described the logistical advantage of that strategy, as "extreme luck in terms of licensing songs from major artists", and also picked recent songs allowing Linklater to know which songs would stand the test of time. For the film's later sequences, consultants had approved Linklater's music tastes as his guesses on which songs would hold that power for years. Linklater recalled that he listened to the studio albums Kid A (2000) by Radiohead and The Soft Bulletin (1999) by The Flaming Lips while directing Waking Life (2001), as those albums were new at the time, and hearing them over a decade brings them back. For this film, The Suburbs (2010) by Arcade Fire served that function, with Linklater adding "I met [Arcade Fire’s] Will Butler last year and I was like, ‘Hey man, you don’t know how much that album occupied the last part of this movie". The song "Deep Blue" from the album was played at the film's conclusion. One of the songs, "Hero" (2012) by the indie rock band Family of the Year, was the last song chosen for the film, as Linklater thought that, like the Harrison song, it was "too much", but changed his mind because "it was for a moment that needed a little bit of “too much” in order to work".

A few songs were specifically written for the film, including "Summer Noon" by Jeff Tweedy, which summons "no memories for viewers". Ethan Hawke also contributed to the original songs for the film, saying: "When Rick [Richard Linklater] and I decided to make my character a songwriter, he gave me the challenge to write some songs for the movie. We didn’t know at that time whether they would be in the movie or not, but it allowed me to take some time and get into character. It was just an exercise for me to find my character. I wrote a song for my kids and wrote a song for my wife imagining from the standpoint of my character. That way, if we wanted to get to know Mason Sr. as a musician the material was there." He further continued, "At one point in the film we see him playing an old Guy Clark song, so we had this image in mind of the kind of musician he would be: a Townes van Zandt wannabe. If it had been a normal movie I never would have been able to come up with two songs, but I had 12 years! It was one of those things where Rick said, “Over the next year, try and write a song.” I played it for him and he loved it and he said “Why don’t you play it for the kids in the movie?” Then we came up with another one that seemed appropriate for the film and incorporated it into the story." Three of the songs were written by Ethan Hawke, and were performed by the film's cast along with Charlie Sexton. Those tracks were eventually not included in the album.

== Track listing ==
No.	Title	Performer(s)	Length
1.	"Summer Noon"	Jeff Tweedy	3:33
2.	"Yellow"	Coldplay	4:28
3.	"Hate To Say I Told You So"	The Hives	3:19
4.	"Could We"	Cat Power	2:21
5.	"Do You Realize??"	The Flaming Lips	3:32
6.	"Crazy"	Gnarls Barkley	2:58
7.	"One (Blake's Got a New Face)"	Vampire Weekend	3:13
8.	"Hate It Here"	Wilco	4:31
9.	"Good Girls Go Bad"	Cobra Starship ft. Leighton Meester	3:16
10.	"Beyond The Horizon"	Bob Dylan	5:34
11.	"Band on the Run"	Paul McCartney and Wings	5:11
12.	"She's Long Gone"	The Black Keys	3:06
13.	"Somebody That I Used to Know"	Gotye ft. Kimbra	4:03
14.	"I'll Be Around"	Yo La Tengo	4:45
15.	"Hero"	Family of the Year	3:10
16.	"Deep Blue"	Arcade Fire	4:27
Total length:			61:27

== Reception and analysis ==
The soundtrack received much acclaim from critics, who mentioned it in several reviews as one of the best aspects of the film. Kasmin Fernandes of The Times of India wrote "It’s the kind of music you’d expect a young boy to listen to in his growing up years and into the confusing teenage years and will take you on a nostalgic trip through your own boy/girlhood." James Christopher Monger of Allmusic wrote "like other soundtracks for Linklater films such as Dazed and Confused (1993), Suburbia (1996), and School of Rock (2003), [Boyhood] features an eclectic roster of artists running the gamut from classic rock to punk and indie pop". Jeff Simon of The Buffalo News gave it a rating of three-and-a-half out of five, describing it as "A movie soundtrack disc that winds up to be even more interesting than it thinks it is".

On incorporating music that represented the time period, including the likes of Coldplay and Arcade Fire, John Keenan of The Guardian opined "More subtle directors know our memories are not shaped by the top 40, but by the sound coming out of a neighbour's window, the song your first love's mother played non-stop, the tune that a best friend left behind when they moved to another country. The subtle and often contradictory associations carried by specific tunes – what the good people in the mood-music industry call its "topology" – are deeply subjective." Rebecca Thomas of BBC wrote, "The biggest artifice in the film is the soundtrack, carefully chosen songs - many by Coltrane - to reflect the era onscreen."

Analysing the film's soundtrack, Chris Longo and Nick Harley of Den of Geek wrote "Boyhood’s soundtrack–though lacking the enigmatic fullness of a Hans Zimmer score–is as essential to moving the film’s plot along as any absentee father or degree-waving mother or grateful former yard worker." Longo said that "Yellow" by Coldplay was taken in the context of Olivia's perspective, as a mother's love for his child, while "1901" by Phoenix "is about love not being bound by the physical nature of the relationship. Love has to exist as you do, it has to change as you do, or it won’t survive". Referencing the hit songs "One (Blake’s Got a New Face)" (Vampire Weekend), "Anthem Part Two" (Blink-182) and the Britney Spears single "Oops!... I Did It Again", Harley mentioned that "watching the film triggers similar memories and becomes a deeply nostalgic experience, with the soundtrack especially feeding into that. The songs chosen are great signifiers of what music mattered most at that place and time, making it a perfect snapshot of the first decade of the 21st century."

== Awards and nominations ==
Three of the original songs, "Split the Difference", "Ryan's Song" and "Summer Noon" were shortlisted for the Best Original Song category at the 87th Academy Awards, but were not selected. "Split the Difference" later received a nomination in the same category at the 19th Satellite Awards, but lost to "We Will Not Go" from Virunga (2015). At the 2014 St. Louis Gateway Film Critics Association Awards, the soundtrack received a nomination for Best Soundtrack, which was lost to Guardians of the Galaxy (2014).

== Additional music ==
- "Anthem Part Two" – Blink-182
- "Try Again" – Aaliyah
- "Oops I Did It Again" – Lorelei Linklater
- "Soak Up the Sun" – Sheryl Crow
- "Whomping Willow and The Snowball Fight" – John Williams; from Harry Potter and The Prisoner of Azkaban (2004)
- "My Good Gal" – Old Crow Medicine Show
- "Rock And Roll (Part 2)" – Gary Glitter
- "Split the Difference" – Ethan Hawke and Charlie Sexton
- "Freaks! Freaks!" – Pigeon John
- "I Held Onto My Pride and Let Her Go" – Dale Watson
- "Crank That (Soulja Boy)" – Soulja Boy
- "We’re All In This Together" – Cassidy Johnson
- "L.A. Freeway" – Ethan Hawke
- "1901" – Phoenix
- "LoveGame" – Lady Gaga
- "Desencabulada" – Luísa Maita
- "Lero Lero" – Luísa Maita
- "Let It Die" – Foo Fighters
- "Sous le Soleil" – Major Boys ft. Aurélia
- "Wish You Were Here" – Savannah Welch
- "Radioactive" – Kings Of Leon
- "Sunshine Day" – Osibisa
- "Telephone" – Lady Gaga
- "Happy Birthday to You"
- "Ryan’s Song" – Ethan Hawke, Ellar Coltrane, Lorelei Linklater and Jennifer Tooley
- "Notre Dame Victory March"
- "Pout" – David Clark and Sam Dillon
- "Helena Beat" – Foster the People
- "Suburban War" – Arcade Fire
- "Gobbelins" – Bruce Salmon and Wayne Sutton
- "Old Black Crow" – Austin Steamers
- "Trojans" – Atlas Genius
- "Não Acorde o Neném" – Moreno Veloso
- "Em Todo Lugar Voz Boa" – Moreno Veloso
- "Que Mala" – Freddy Fender
- "Coisa Boa" – Moreno Veloso
- "The Dog Song" – Charlie Sexton

== Chart performance ==
Chart (2018)	Peak position
Belgian Albums (Ultratop Flanders)	171
UK Soundtrack Albums (OCC)	43
US Billboard 200	53
US Soundtrack Albums (Billboard)	16

== Legacy and influence ==
A compilation album of solo materials recorded by members of the British rock group The Beatles, titled The Black Album was compiled by Ethan Hawke to give to his daughter Maya on her 13th birthday on July 8, 2011, that consisted of 51 songs from the Beatles' members following their breakup in 1970. This was incorporated into Boyhood in scenes shot later that year, with Hawke's character Mason Sr. giving it to his son as a birthday present. The track list of the album was unveiled on July 21, 2014.
