= So Electric: When It Was Now (The Remixes) =

Remix album by Atlas Genius
- Released: 29 November 2013
- Recorded: 2012–2013; The Orchard (Adelaide, South Australia, Australia)
- Label: Warner Bros.
- Producer: Atlas Genius

Atlas Genius chronology
Trojans (2013)	So Electric: When It Was Now (The Remixes) (2013)	Inanimate Objects (2015)

So Electric: When It Was Now (The Remixes) is a remix album by Australian alternative rock band Atlas Genius. It was released as a 12" vinyl exclusively available at record stores on 29 November 2013. The vinyl is limited to 3,000 copies and includes a digital download card. The album was scheduled to be released digitally on 24 December 2013; it was ultimately released one week earlier on 17 December. This album contains remixes of songs from Atlas Genius' debut studio album, When It Was Now.

== Track listing ==
All tracks are written by Keith Jeffery, Michael Jeffery, Steven Jeffery and Darren Sell.

No.	Title	Producer(s)	Length
1.	"Trojans" (Lenno Remix)	Atlas Genius (remix and additional production by Lenno)	4:41
2.	"If So" (Magic Man Remix)	Atlas Genius (remix and additional production by Magic Man)	3:59
3.	"Centred On You" (Viceroy Remix)	Atlas Genius (remix and additional production by Viceroy)	3:47
4.	"Back Seat" (Goldroom Remix)	Atlas Genius (remix and additional production by Goldroom)	3:51
5.	"If So" (TheFatRat Remix)	Atlas Genius (remix and additional production by TheFatRat)	4:17
6.	"Centred on You" (St. Lucia Remix)	Atlas Genius (remix and additional production by St. Lucia)	5:26
7.	"Symptoms" (Pierce Fulton Remix)	Atlas Genius (remix and additional production by Pierce Fulton)	4:34
8.	"Trojans" (Xaphoon Jones Remix)	Atlas Genius (remix and additional production by Xaphoon Jones)	3:57
9.	"Electric" (Vertigo Remix)	Atlas Genius (remix and additional production by Vertigo)	5:16
10.	"Symptoms" (Wild Cub Remix)	Atlas Genius (remix and additional production by Wild Cub)	3:41

Notes

- "Centred On You" (Viceroy Remix) and "Symptoms" (Wild Cub Remix) are not included on the vinyl release.

== Release history ==
Region	Date	Format	Label
United States	29 November 2013	LP record	Warner Bros.
United States	17 December 2013	Digital download	Warner Bros.
Worldwide	17 December 2013	Digital download	Warner Bros.
