= TheFatRat =

German DJ and record producer (born 1979)

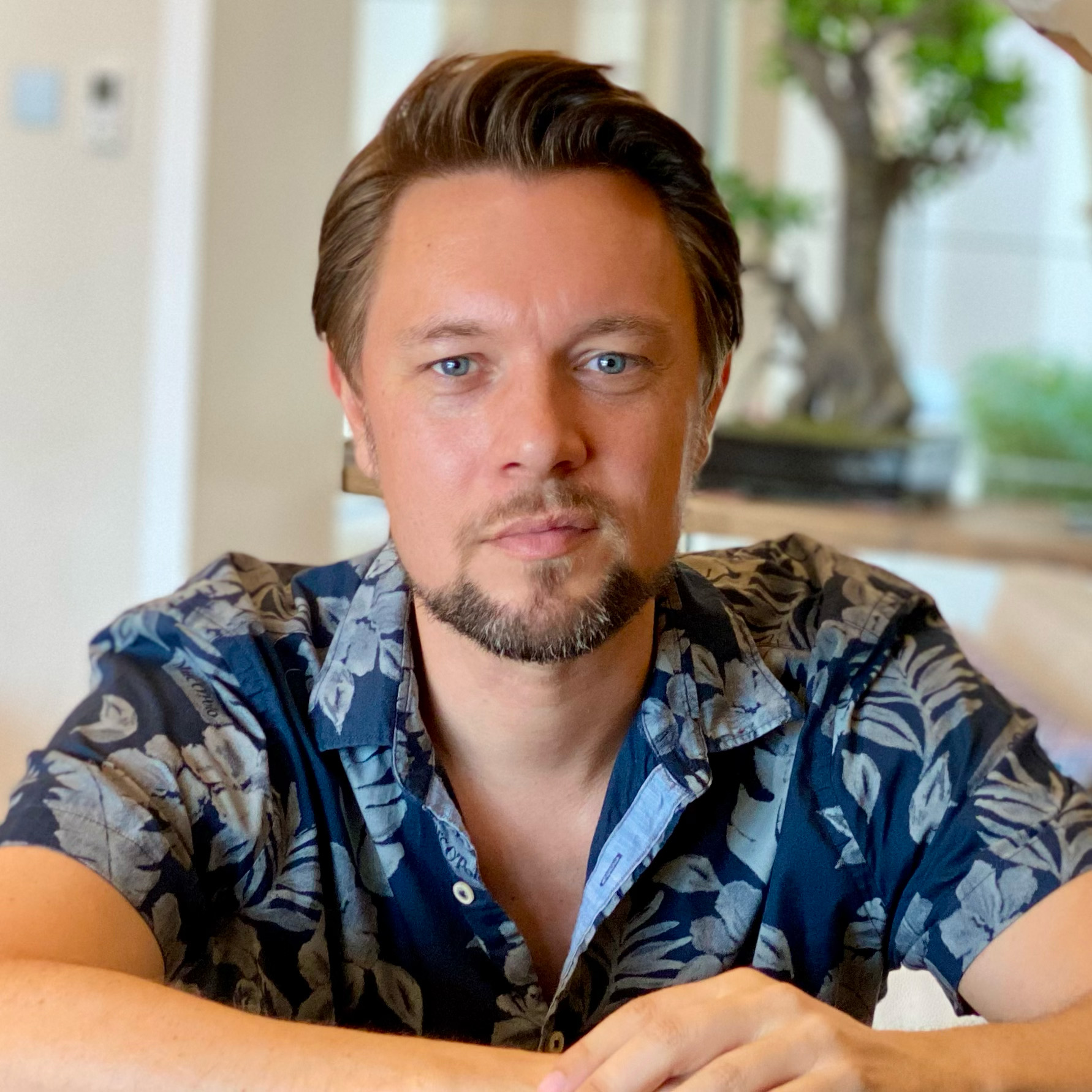
- TheFatRat in 2020

Background information
- Born: Christian Friedrich Johannes Büttner; 1 June 1979 (age 47); Göttingen, Lower Saxony, West Germany
- Genres: Glitch hop; EDM; progressive house; electro house
- Occupations: Record producer; DJ; audio engineer
- Instruments: Piano, electronic keyboard, hang drum, synthesizer, digital audio workstation
- Years active: 2001–present
- Labels: Pharisade; The Arcadium; Universal Music Group; Rhino Entertainment; Tasty; Seeking Blue; Monstercat; Spinnin Records
- Website: www.thefatrat.com

Christian Friedrich Johannes Büttner (German: [ˈkʁɪsti̯an ˈfʁɪdʁɪç joˈhanəs ˈbʏtnɐ]), known professionally as TheFatRat, is a German DJ, record producer and musician. His genre is often described as "glitch-hop." His 2016 extended play Jackpot reached 23 on the Billboard Dance/Electronic Albums chart. He peaked at 25 on Billboard's Next Big Sound chart in February 2015.

== Early life ==
Büttner originally aspired to become a classical conductor. He began producing music in 2001 under his real name. He began by making background music for television, radio and advertisements and produced music for DJs.

== Career ==
In 2010, Büttner produced the song Mignon Mignon for René la Taupe, which became a number-one single in France. Around that time, he also produced the song "Audubon Ballroom" on Lupe Fiasco's album Food & Liquor II: The Great American Rap Album Pt. 1, which charted at #5 on the Billboard 200.

In July 2011, he began making solo music under the pseudonym TheFatRat. The nickname given to him was Ratte, which is German for rat. It came from his short stature as he is 5 feet tall. His career began with the release of his first EP, Do Be Do Be Do.

Unity
Büttner's 2014 song Unity, featuring a mix of EDM and chiptune.

By 2014, Büttner's music was used in over 1.5 million YouTube videos. His single "Unity" was included on the album Sounds of Syndication Vol. 1 curated by Tom Cassell, one of the most subscribed streamers on Twitch.

In November 2016, Büttner released his second EP, Jackpot, on the Universal Music label. The EP reached #23 on the Billboard Dance/Electronic Albums chart. In December 2016, Büttner started a record label, The Arcadium, in collaboration with Universal Music.

In June 2017, Büttner released the single "Fly Away" featuring vocalist Anjulie. In July, he performed at the Electric Forest Festival. In October 2017, he released the single "Oblivion" featuring vocalist Lola Blanc.

In March 2018, he released the single "MAYDAY". In July 2018, he released "Warrior Songs", a music pack for the video game Dota 2, which has been made available in the game as of 13 September 2018, according to Matthew "Cyborgmatt" Bailey, director of operations of Team Secret.

In December 2018, he posted a video about how YouTube's content ID system is "broken", as an anonymous user known as Ramjets claimed all the earnings for his song "The Calling" and YouTube refused to settle the dispute. The claim was removed by YouTube later. As an act of gratitude towards the YouTube community standing up for him, he announced that all of his music would be free to use for creative videos on the platform, without fear of him claiming or copyright striking any video.

From sometime around 2020, Redbull.com made a 10-minute documentary about Büttner and his career titled, TheFatRat: Everything You Ever Wanted To Know About Him. They released this within their article, "TheFatRat: Meet the EDM DJ who's elevated video game music to high art."

On 7 February 2020, Büttner released a sci-fi music video on YouTube starring himself and Maisy Kay for a special song called "The Storm," where he performed with Kay. The music video was filmed in Iceland, with Surtshellir Cave on the first day, Hekla Mountain on the second day, and Hjörleifshöfði on the third and final day. Accompanying the music video is a game for mobile titled The Storm - Interactive, where one can play through the story of the video. To conclude the year, he did a collaboration with South Korean vocalist AleXa for “Rule the World”.

On 13 April 2021, he released his first studio album, titled Parallax, containing over 10 songs. Artists featured on the collaborative setlist were Laura Brehm, Anjulie, RIELL, Cecilia Gault, Lindsey Stirling, and Everen Maxwell.

== Discography ==
=== Mixtapes ===
Year	Title	Information
2019	End of the Decade	Released: 12 December 2019; Labels: Monstercat, self-released, The Arcadium, Universal Music, Tasty, Seeking Blue, Enter Records; Format: Digital download
2024	Unity 10th Anniversary Mixtape	Released: 29 September 2024; Labels: The Arcadium, Pharisade, Tasty, Universal Music; Format: Digital download

=== Albums ===
Year	Title	Information
2018	Warrior Songs (from Dota 2)	Released: 20 July 2018 and 13 September 2018; Label: The Arcadium; Format: Digital Download
2021	PARALLAX	Released: 10 September 2021; Label: The Arcadium; Format: Digital download
2023	Eo and Eden	Released: between 5 April 2023 and an unannounced final date, as of July 2026; Label: Pharisade; Format: Digital download

=== Extended plays ===
Year	Title	Information	Peak chart positions	Aditional notes
Year	Title	Information	US Dance	Aditional notes
2011	Do Be Do Be Do	Released: 28 July 2011; Label: self-released; Format: Digital download	–	
2016	Jackpot	Released: 18 November 2016; Label: Universal Music; Format: Digital download	23	
2020	Classics Remixed	Released: 12 June 2020; Label: The Arcadium; Format: Digital download	–	
2024	Ray Tracer	Released: 27 September 2024; Label: Pharisade; Format: Digital download	–	Part of the Eo and Eden album.

=== Singles ===
Title	Date	Album	Extended Play	Label
"Some Body"	2011	Non-album singles	Do Be Do Be Do EP	Self-written
"Less Than Three"	2011	Non-album singles	Do Be Do Be Do EP	Self-written
"Do Be Do Be Do"	2011	Non-album singles	Do Be Do Be Do EP	Self-written
"Splinter"	2013	Non-album singles	Not from extended plays	Spinnin Records
"Dancing Naked"	2013	Non-album singles	Not from extended plays	The Arcadium
"Infinite Power!"	2014	Rocket League OST	Not from extended plays	The Arcadium
"Unity"	2014	Sounds of Syndication Vol. 1	Not from extended plays	The Arcadium
"Windfall"	2014	Tasty Album 001 - Entree	Not from extended plays	Tasty
"Xenogenesis"	2014	Tasty Album 001 - Entree	Not from extended plays	Tasty
"Never Be Alone"	2015	Tasty Album 001 - Entree	Not from extended plays	Tasty
"Time Lapse"	2015	Non-album singles	Not from extended plays	The Arcadium
"Telescope"	2015	Taking You Higher	Not from extended plays	Seeking Blue
"Telescope"	2015	Taking You Higher	Not from extended plays	Pharisade
"Monody" (featuring Laura Brehm)	2015	Non-album singles	Not from extended plays	The Arcadium
"The Calling" (featuring Laura Brehm)	2016	Non-album singles	Not from extended plays	The Arcadium
"No No No"	2016	Non-album singles	Not from extended plays	The Arcadium
"Youtubers Life Rap" (with Kronno Zomber)	2016	Non-album singles	Not from extended plays	The Arcadium
"Jackpot"	2016	Non-album singles	Jackpot EP	Universal Music
"Epic"	2016	Non-album singles	Jackpot EP	Universal Music
"Prelude"	2016	Non-album singles	Jackpot EP	Universal Music
"Elegy"	2016	Non-album singles	Jackpot EP	Universal Music
"Prelude (VIP Edit)" (with JJD)	2017	Non-album singles	Jackpot EP	Universal Music
"Fly Away" (featuring Anjulie)	2017	Non-album singles	Not from extended plays	Universal Music
"Oblivion" (featuring Lola Blanc)	2017	Non-album singles	Not from extended plays	Universal Music
"MAYDAY" (featuring Laura Brehm)	2018	Non-album singles	Not from extended plays	Universal Music
"Warrior Song" (with Stasia Estep)	2018	Warrior Songs	Not from extended plays	The Arcadium
"Origin"	2018	Warrior Songs	Not from extended plays	The Arcadium
"Ascendancy"	2018	Warrior Songs	Not from extended plays	The Arcadium
"Nemesis"	2018	Warrior Songs	Not from extended plays	The Arcadium
"Origin Reprise"	2018	Warrior Songs	Not from extended plays	The Arcadium
"Elevate"	2018	Warrior Songs	Not from extended plays	The Arcadium
"Kingdom Come"	2018	Warrior Songs	Not from extended plays	The Arcadium
"Mad Moon Falling"	2018	Warrior Songs	Not from extended plays	The Arcadium
"Threnody"	2018	Warrior Songs	Not from extended plays	The Arcadium
"Envelope"	2018	Warrior Songs	Not from extended plays	The Arcadium
"Reminiscence"	2018	Warrior Songs	Not from extended plays	The Arcadium
"Afterlife"	2018	Warrior Songs	Not from extended plays	The Arcadium
"Chosen" (with Anna Yvette and Laura Brehm)	2019	Non-album singles	Not from extended plays	Universal Music
"Solitude" (with Slaydit)	2019	Non-album singles	Not from extended plays	Universal Music
"Sunlight" (with Phaera)	2019	Non-album singles	Not from extended plays	The Arcadium
"Stronger" (with Slaydit and Anjulie)	2019	Non-album singles	Not from extended plays	Monstercat
"Close to the Sun" (with Anjulie)	2019	Non-album singles	Not from extended plays	The Arcadium
"Rise Up"	2019	Non-album singles	Not from extended plays	Enter Records
"Rise Up (Orchestra Version)"	2019	Non-album singles	Not from extended plays	Enter Records
"The Storm" (with Maisy Kay)	2020	Non-album singles	Not from extended plays	The Arcadium
"Electrified"	2020	Non-album singles	Not from extended plays	The Arcadium
"We'll Meet Again" (with Laura Brehm)	2020	Non-album singles	Not from extended plays	The Arcadium
"Rule the World" (with AleXa)	2020	Non-album singles	Not from extended plays	The Arcadium
"Hiding in the Blue" (with RIELL)	2021	PARALLAX	Not from extended plays	The Arcadium
"Arcadia"	2021	PARALLAX	Not from extended plays	The Arcadium
"Pride & Fear" (with RIELL)	2021	PARALLAX	Not from extended plays	The Arcadium
"Upwind"	2021	PARALLAX	Not from extended plays	The Arcadium
"Our Song" (with Cecilia Gault)	2021	PARALLAX	Not from extended plays	The Arcadium
"Violet Sky" (with Cecilia Gault)	2021	PARALLAX	Not from extended plays	The Arcadium
"Warbringer" (with Everen Maxwell and featuring Lindsey Stirling)	2021	PARALLAX	Not from extended plays	The Arcadium
"Fire"	2021	PARALLAX	Not from extended plays	The Arcadium
"Love It When You Hurt Me" (with Anjulie)	2021	PARALLAX	Not from extended plays	The Arcadium
"Let Love Win" (with Anjulie)	2021	PARALLAX	Not from extended plays	The Arcadium
"Ghost Light" (with Everglow)	2022	Non-album singles	Not from extended plays	Pharisade
"Back One Day" (with NEFFEX)	2022	Non-album singles	Not from extended plays	Pharisade
"Monkeys"	2023	Non-album singles	Not from extended plays	Pharisade
"Monkeys Remix"	2023	Non-album singles	Not from extended plays	Pharisade
"Out of the Rain" (with Shiah Maisel)	2023	Eo and Eden	Not from extended plays	Pharisade
"Hunger"	2023	Eo and Eden	Not from extended plays	Pharisade
"Escaping Gravity" (with Cecilia Gault)	2023	Eo and Eden	Not from extended plays	Pharisade
"Sail Away" (featuring Laura Brehm)	2024	Eo and Eden	Not from extended plays	Pharisade
"Still Here with You"	2024	Eo and Eden	Not from extended plays	Pharisade
"Myself & I" (with RIELL)	2024	Eo and Eden	Not from extended plays	Pharisade
"Ray Tracer" (with Sprites and featuring Flavia)	2024	Eo and Eden	Ray Tracer EP	Pharisade
"P. S."	2024	Eo and Eden	Ray Tracer EP	Pharisade
"Whispers" (featuring Reptythm)	2024	Eo and Eden	Ray Tracer EP	Pharisade
"Out of Love"	2025	Eo and Eden	Not from extended plays	Pharisade
"Killing Me"	2025	Eo and Eden	Not from extended plays	Pharisade
"Genius" (with Shiah Maisel)	2025	Eo and Eden	Not from extended plays	Pharisade
"HONK"	2025	Non-album singles	Not from extended plays	Pharisade
"Give Myself to You" (with Laura Brehm)	2025	Eo and Eden	Not from extended plays	Pharisade

=== Remixes ===
Date	Title	Artist
2012	Very Good Feeling	Flo Rida
2012	Next Levels	Avicii
2012	Brightside	The Knocks
2012	Somebody I Used To Know	Gotye
2012	Don't Stop	Foster the People
2012	The Night Out	Martin Solveig
2012	Turn The World On	Static Revenger
2012	Float	Pacific Air
2012	Don't Wake Me Up	Chris Brown
2013	The Feeling	The Knocks
2013	Set It Off (ft. Lazerdisk Party Sex)	Diplo
2013	The Tide	Singularity (ft. Steffi Nguyen)
2013	If So	Atlas Genius
2013	Picking Up All The Pieces	Strange Talk
2013	All Night	Icona Pop
2015	We Are The Dream	Sound Remedy
2018	Salt is My Sugar	MarieMarie
2019	Pokémon Theme	Video Games Live
2023	Monkeys	TheFatRat

=== Mashups ===
Date	Title	Artists	Songs
2012	Do Harder Be Faster	TheFatRat	Do Be Do Be Do
2012	Do Harder Be Faster	Daft Punk	Harder, Better, Faster, Stronger
2012	Drive Space Junk	PrototypeRaptor	Drive Hard
2012	Drive Space Junk	Wolfgang Gartner	Space Junk

=== Other songs ===
Title	Date	Album	Extended Play
"No Escaping You" (released in SoundCloud; now private)	2012	Non-album singles	Not from extended plays
"Everything" (upcoming)	2021 (originally, TBA)	Non-album singles	Everything EP (upcoming extended play)
"Blue Sakura" (cancelled)	2021	PARALLAX	Not from extended plays
"Eyes Wide Shut" (cancelled)	2023	Eo and Eden	Not from extended plays
"Kawaii Side Of Life" (it was meant for Ray Tracer EP, and hence, in Eo and Eden as well, but was cut; it was added in unity’s 10’th anniversary mixtape).	2024	Eo and Eden (it was meant to be there, but was cut)	Ray Tracer EP (it was meant to be there, but was cut)

=== List of vocalists ===
Singer	Song	Date
CeCe Rogers	"Unity" (original version; sampled from his song "Someday")	2014
Laura Brehm	"Unity" (choir; pitched-up vocals; common special version; not credited)	2014
Laura Brehm	"Monody"	2015
Laura Brehm	"The Calling"	2016
Laura Brehm	"MAYDAY"	2018
Laura Brehm	Majority of "Chosen"	2019
Laura Brehm	"We'll Meet Again"	2020
Laura Brehm	"Sail Away"	2024
Laura Brehm	"Give Myself To You"	2025
TheFatRat	"Infinite Power"	2016
TheFatRat	"The Calling" (choir)	2016
TheFatRat	"No No No" (Pitched-down vocals)	2016
TheFatRat	"Fly Away" (Pitched-down vocals)	2017
TheFatRat	"Electrified" (Sampled from KLOUD's song of the same name, which features him; but then it was canceled and then released under TheFatRat's name)	2020
TheFatRat	"Killing Me"	2025
TheFatRat	"HONK" (Pitched-down vocals)	2025
Anjulie	"Fly Away" (normal vocals)	2017
Anjulie	"Stronger"	2019
Anjulie	"Close To The Sun"	2019
Anjulie	"Love It When You Hurt Me" (normal vocals)	2021
Anjulie	"Let Love Win"	2021
Lola Blanc	"Oblivion"	2017
Stasia Estep	"Warrior Song"	2018
Anna Yvette	"Chosen"	2019
Michaella Ryall	"Sunlight" (sampled from JC's song "Missing Summer", which features her)	2019
Moa Petterson Hammar	"Rise Up" (not credited)	2019
Maisy Kay	"The Storm"	2020
Josh Mhire	"Love It When You Hurt Me" (Pitched-down vocals)	2020
AleXa	"Rule The World"	2020
RIELL	"Hiding In The Blue"	2021
RIELL	"Pride & Fear"	2021
RIELL	"Myself & I"	2024
Cecilia Gault	"Our Song"	2021
Cecilia Gault	"Violet Sky"	2021
Cecilia Gault	"Escaping Gravity"	2023
Cecilia Gault	"Out Of Love" (not credited)	2025
Lindsey Stirling	"Warbringer"	2021
Everglow	"Ghost Light"	2022
NEFFEX	"Back One Day"	2022
Shiah Maisel	"Out Of The Rain"	2023
Shiah Maisel	"Genius"	2025
Kinnie Lane	"Hunger" (not credited)	2023
Sprites	"Ray Tracer"	2024
Sprites	"Out Of Love" (not credited)	2025
