= Trojans (song) =

Single by Atlas Genius

from the album When It Was Now
- Released: May 4, 2011
- Genre: Alternative rock, indie rock
- Length: 3:39
- Label: Warner Bros.

Atlas Genius singles chronology
| "Trojans" (2011) | "If So" (2013) |

Trojans is the debut single of Australian alternative rock band Atlas Genius, released on May 4, 2011 . It is from the extended plays Through the Glass and Trojans, and later appeared on their debut studio album When It Was Now (2013).

== Charts ==
=== Weekly charts ===
| Chart (2013) | Peak position |
|---|---|
| Canada Rock (Billboard) | 14 |
| US Bubbling Under Hot 100 (Billboard) | 8 |
| US Hot Rock & Alternative Songs (Billboard) | 17 |
| US Rock & Alternative Airplay (Billboard) | 4 |

=== Year-end charts ===
| Chart (2012) | Position |
|---|---|
| US Hot Rock & Alternative Songs (Billboard) | 86 |
| Chart (2013) | Position |
| US Hot Rock & Alternative Songs (Billboard) | 35 |

== Certifications ==
| Region | Certification | Certified units/sales |
|---|---|---|
| United States (RIAA) | Platinum | 1,000,000^{‡} |
^{‡} Sales+streaming figures based on certification alone.
