= Loma Vista =

Studio album by Family of the Year
- Released: July 10, 2012
- Genre: Indie rock, indie folk, indie pop
- Length: 38:06
- Label: Nettwerk
- Producer: Wax Ltd, Family of the Year

Family of the Year chronology
Songbook (2009)	Loma Vista (2012)	Family of the Year (2015)

Singles from Loma Vista
- 1. "St. Croix" Released: March 6, 2012; 2. "Diversity" Released: May 29, 2012; 3. "Hero" Released: October 12, 2012; 4. "The Stairs" Released: 2013

Loma Vista is the major-label debut studio album by American band Family of the Year. It was released on July 10, 2012. The album peaked at No. 23 on the Billboard Folk Album chart in April 2013, and has sold 32,000 copies in the United States as of August 2015.

== Reception ==
Professional ratings
Aggregate scores
Source	Rating
Metacritic	78/100
Review scores
Source	Rating
AllMusic	4/5 stars
Consequence of Sound	3/5 stars
DIY	6/10
NME	4/5 stars

Loma Vista received positive reviews from critics upon release. On Metacritic, the album holds a score of 78/100 based on 5 reviews, indicating "generally favorable reviews".

== Track listing ==
All songs written by Joseph Keefe, except where noted.

1. "The Stairs" (Joseph Keefe, Christina Schroeter) - 3:51
2. "Diversity" - 3:40
3. "St. Croix" (Joseph Keefe, James Buckey, Sebastian Keefe, Christina Schroeter) - 3:35
4. "Buried" - 3:07
5. "Hero" - 3:10
6. "Everytime" - 2:47
7. "Living on Love" (Joseph Keefe, James Buckey, Sebastian Keefe, Christina Schroeter) - 3:23
8. "Hey Ma" - 3:38
9. "In the End" (Joseph Keefe, James Buckey, Sebastian Keefe, Christina Schroeter) - 4:20
10. "Never Enough" - 3:19
11. "Find It" (Joseph Keefe, James Buckey) - 3:50

== Personnel ==
- Joseph Keefe (vocals/guitar)
- Sebastian Keefe (drums/vocals)
- James Buckey (guitar/vocals)
- Christina Schroeter (keyboard/vocals)

== Charts ==
Chart (2012–2014)	Peak position
Belgian Albums (Ultratop Flanders)	77
German Albums (Offizielle Top 100)	31
Swiss Albums (Schweizer Hitparade)	80
UK Independent Albums (OCC)	30
US Heatseekers Albums (Billboard)	35
US Americana/Folk Albums (Billboard)	23
