= Molecules Remix EP =

2015 EP by Atlas Genius

EP / Remix album by Atlas Genius
- Released: 13 November 2015
- Genre: Alternative rock
- Length: 31:54
- Label: Warner Bros.
- Producer: Atlas Genius

Atlas Genius chronology
Inanimate Objects (2015)	Molecules Remix EP (2015)	End of the Tunnel (2024)

Molecules Remix EP is an extended play (EP) and remix album by Australian alternative rock band Atlas Genius. It was released on 13 November 2015 by Warner Bros. Records.

This release contains remixes of the single "Molecules," taken from Atlas Genius' second studio album, Inanimate Objects.

== Track listing ==
No.	Title	Producer(s)	Length
1.	"Molecules" (Lenno Remix)	Atlas Genius (remix and additional production by Lenno)	5:32
2.	"Molecules" (Latroit Remix)	Atlas Genius (remix and additional production by Latroit)	6:09
3.	"Molecules" (Madeaux Remix)	Atlas Genius (remix and additional production by Viceroy)	4:07
4.	"Molecules" (BXY Remix)	Atlas Genius (remix and additional production by BXY)	5:07
5.	"Molecules" (Penguin Prison Remix)	Atlas Genius (remix and additional production by Penguin Prison)	4:59
6.	"Molecules" (Joywave Remix)	Atlas Genius (remix and additional production by Joywave)	6:00
Total length:			31:54

== Release history ==
Region	Date	Format	Label	Ref.
Worldwide	13 November 2015	Digital download	Warner Bros.	
