= René la Taupe =

Animated groundhog created by Jamba!

- First appearance: "Scheiße, Ich Liebe Dich" (2009)
- Last appearance: "Tous à Poil" (2013)
- Voiced by: Christian Büttner (German); Unknown (French); Unknown (Spanish); Grolla Studio (Dutch); Unknown (Hungarian); Unknown (English); Unknown (Italian)

In-universe information
- Aliases: Mad Moley (American English), Crazy Mole (British English), Renato la Talpa (Italian), René la Taupe / Fauli (French), Cuki Vaki (Hungarian), Sjon de Mol (Dutch), Маули (Russian)
- Species: Groundhog
- Gender: Male

René la Taupe (English: René the Mole; originally known as Mauli or Fauli in German and Mad Moley in American English) is a virtual animated singing character created in 2009 by Fox Mobile Group studios. Though it is referred to as a mole in several languages, the character is depicted as a groundhog. The character gained popularity through mobile phone ringtones and viral music videos distributed on the Internet. It was developed to market content on behalf of Jamba!, a mobile content provider that had previously commercialized characters like Crazy Frog, Gummibär, and Schnuffel Bunny.

== History and releases ==
The character's debut ringtone, "Scheiße, ich liebe dich" (English: "Shit, I Love You"), gained notice for its crude lyrics becoming the most downloaded track on Jamba Germany in 2009. As a commercial single, it spent nine weeks on the German charts, peaking at number 30, and reached number 38 in Austria.

Following this initial success, the track was translated into multiple languages for international markets. The French version, titled "Merde”, became highly popular. Additional versions were released in Spanish ("Eres un Tostón"), Hungarian ("Büdi"), Italian ("Sei Un Pacco Ma Ti Amo"), and English ("Holy Crap, I Love You").

In May 2010, a second track titled "Mignon Mignon" (English: “Cute, Cute”) was released through Jamba's French division. The lyrics, co-written by Christian Büttner, Hank Hobson, and Marcello Pagin, focused on the character's plump and endearing appearance. Supported by heavy airplay on Fun Radio, the single drove a significant increase in mobile downloads, and its accompanying music video became an Internet meme.

Following the elimination of the French national team from the 2010 FIFA World Cup, Jamba released a parody variation titled "Mauvais, Mauvais" (English: "Bad, Bad"), though the original version remained more commercially successful. By August 2010, the character's official Facebook presence had grown to over 28,000 followers.

In late August 2010, the character launched a back-to-school promotional single and music video titled "C'est la rentrée," which utilized the melody of "Merde", originally based on a melody by the French singer Fadades. This was followed in late October 2010 by the single "Tu parles trop," which debuted at number three on the French Singles Chart.

On 15 November 2010, his debut studio album titled Les Aventures de René la Taupe was released in France. The package included 15 audio tracks alongside a bonus DVD featuring music videos and karaoke versions. The album debuted at number 25 on the French Album charts and eventually peaked at number 20.

In December 2011, the character appeared in a collaborative cross-promotional music video, performing a French rock adaptation of "Jingle Bells" titled "Rock la vie" alongside Alvin and the Chipmunks to promote the film Alvin and the Chipmunks: Chipwrecked.

== Reception and controversies ==
In late July 2010, "Mignon Mignon" reached number two on the SNEP French digital download chart, positioned just behind Shakira's World Cup anthem "Waka Waka (This Time for Africa)". It overtook Shakira's single four weeks later to claim the number-one spot. The song also debuted at number one on the physical singles chart, selling 17,300 units in its first week—the highest weekly sales figure for a single in France since August 2008. The track held the top position for thirteen weeks, while its music video accumulated over 5 million views on YouTube within its first two months.

Despite its commercial success, the character faced significant online backlash. It became a frequent target of negative commentary on platforms like Twitter. Additionally, deletion discussions were initiated for the character's articles on both the French and German Wikipedias, with critics arguing that the character was a short-lived fad that did not warrant encyclopedic coverage, though both articles were ultimately retained. Jamba also received regional criticism from Hungarian internet users, who frequently compared the character negatively to another of the company's virtual properties, Schnuffel.

== Discography ==
=== Albums ===
Year	Title	Chart positions		Certification (FR)
Year	Title	FR	FR (DD)	Certification (FR)
2010	Les Aventures de René la Taupe	20	—	—

=== Singles ===
Year	Title	Chart positions			Certification (FR)
Year	Title	FR^{1}	GER	AUT	Certification (FR)
2009	"Scheiße, ich liebe dich"	—	30	38	—
2010	"Mignon Mignon"	1	—	—	Gold
2010	"Tu parles trop"	3	—	—	—
2010	"Petit papa Noël"	—	—	—	—
2011	"Ou la la"	62^{2}	—	—	—
2011	"Rock la vie"	41	—	—	—

- ^{1} Represents the physical sales chart until 2010, and the combined physical and digital chart after 2010.
- ^{2} Reached No. 4 on the French physical sales chart.

== See also ==
- List of artists who reached number one on the French Singles Chart
- List of fictional moles
