= Mignon Mignon =

Single by René la Taupe

from the album Les Aventures de Réné la Taupe
- B-side: "Remix, music video"
- Released: 9 July 2010
- Recorded: 2010
- Genre: Pop
- Length: 2:29
- Label: EMI Music France
- Songwriters: Christian Büttner, Hank Hobson, Marcello Pagin
- Producers: Christian "TheFatRat" Büttner, Marcelio Pagin for Famties Productions, Hank Hobson

René la Taupe singles chronology
| "Merde" (2009) | "Mignon Mignon" (2010) | "Tu parles trop" (2010) |

"Mignon Mignon" is a 2010 song recorded by virtual singing mole René la Taupe. It was the second single from the album Les Aventures de René la Taupe and was released in July 2010. It became a number-one hit in France.

== Background and lyrics ==
Commercial Director of Fox Mobile France Stéphane Boulissière said: "We had a big commercial success with "Merde" with over 100,000 downloads. At the time we proposed this song to a record company but nobody wanted it. We believed in it and we launched "Mignon Mignon"". The song was initially composed for being just a ringtone. The music video was released on the Internet and the music video became immediately an Internet meme, with over 5 million views on YouTube in two months. A few time after, the song was available digitally, then was released as CD single in late August 2010. The single, remixed, instrumental and music video versions were all included in the album.

The lyrics, written by Christian Büttner, Hank Hobson and Marcello Pagin, suggest the chubby look of the animal that makes it adorable. The song deals with topics of overweight and scatology. According to Boulissière, the lyrics are "naive and funny. Success comes from there. These lyrics are a simple opposing view to everything that takes place in French music. And the substance of lyrics - a character who accepts and enjoys the beads - goes against the cult of thin and tanned body." He admitted that the song was performed to generate controversy, and the vulgarity and grammar mistakes in the lyrics were "wanted to create a marketing buzz, to get people talking". The song was not finely-worked.

There was also a derivative version by Jamba, a brand of Fox Mobile Group under the title "Mauvais, Mauvais" (English: "Bad, Bad") released after the failure of the France team in the 2010 FIFA World Cup but it was not successful.

== Chart performances ==
"Mignon, Mignon" debuted at number 12 on the French Digital Chart on 17 July 2010, then climbed to number two where it remained for three weeks and topped the chart for two weeks, then fell off and totaled 18 weeks in the top 50. The success of the single generated an increase of the ringtone sales, becoming one of the most downloaded of the middle of 2010 with help from Fun Radio. On the chart edition of 4 September, the single entered the French Physical Chart at number one. With over 17,300 units sold in this first week, the single performed the highest weekly sales of a single in 2010 in France. The single stayed atop for 13 weeks and eventually become the best-selling single of the year.

In 2010 only, the song sold 114,546 units and 117,389 downloads.

== Controversy ==
In September 2010, pianist and composer Serge Gamany stated that "Mignon Mignon" was actually a plagiarism of one of his songs, "Au Parc de Mougins", a medley for piano and accordion, which was publicly performed weekly during over a year by the chorister residents of a retirement home. Gamany certified that he composed the music "a decade ago", i.e. in the late 1990s or the early 2000. He said he was determined to "assert his legitimate rights", the legal department of the Société des auteurs, compositeurs et éditeurs de musique being on his side.

== Track listings ==
- CD single / Digital download

| No. | Title | Length |
|---|---|---|
| 1. | "Mignon Mignon" | 2:29 |
| 2. | "Mignon Mignon" (remix) | 2:19 |
| 3. | "Mignon Mignon" (music video) | 2:29 |

== Credits ==
- Produced by Christian "TheFatRat" Buttner, Marcello Pagin for Famties Productions and Hank Hobson
- Published by Famties Publishing
- Remixed by Christian "TheFatRat" Büttner and Marcello Pagin for Famties Productions
- Video "Mignon Mignon" by Julian Kramer

== Charts ==
=== Peak positions ===
| Chart (2010) | Peak position |
|---|---|
| Eurochart Hot 100 Singles | 5 |
| French SNEP Digital Chart | 1 |
| French SNEP Singles Chart | 1 |

=== Year-end charts ===
| Chart (2010) | Peak position |
|---|---|
| Eurochart Hot 100 | 40 |
| French SNEP Singles Chart | 1 |

=== Certifications ===
| Country | Certification | Date | Sales certified |
|---|---|---|---|
| France | Gold | 24 November 2010 | 150,000 |
