= Neffex =

American music project

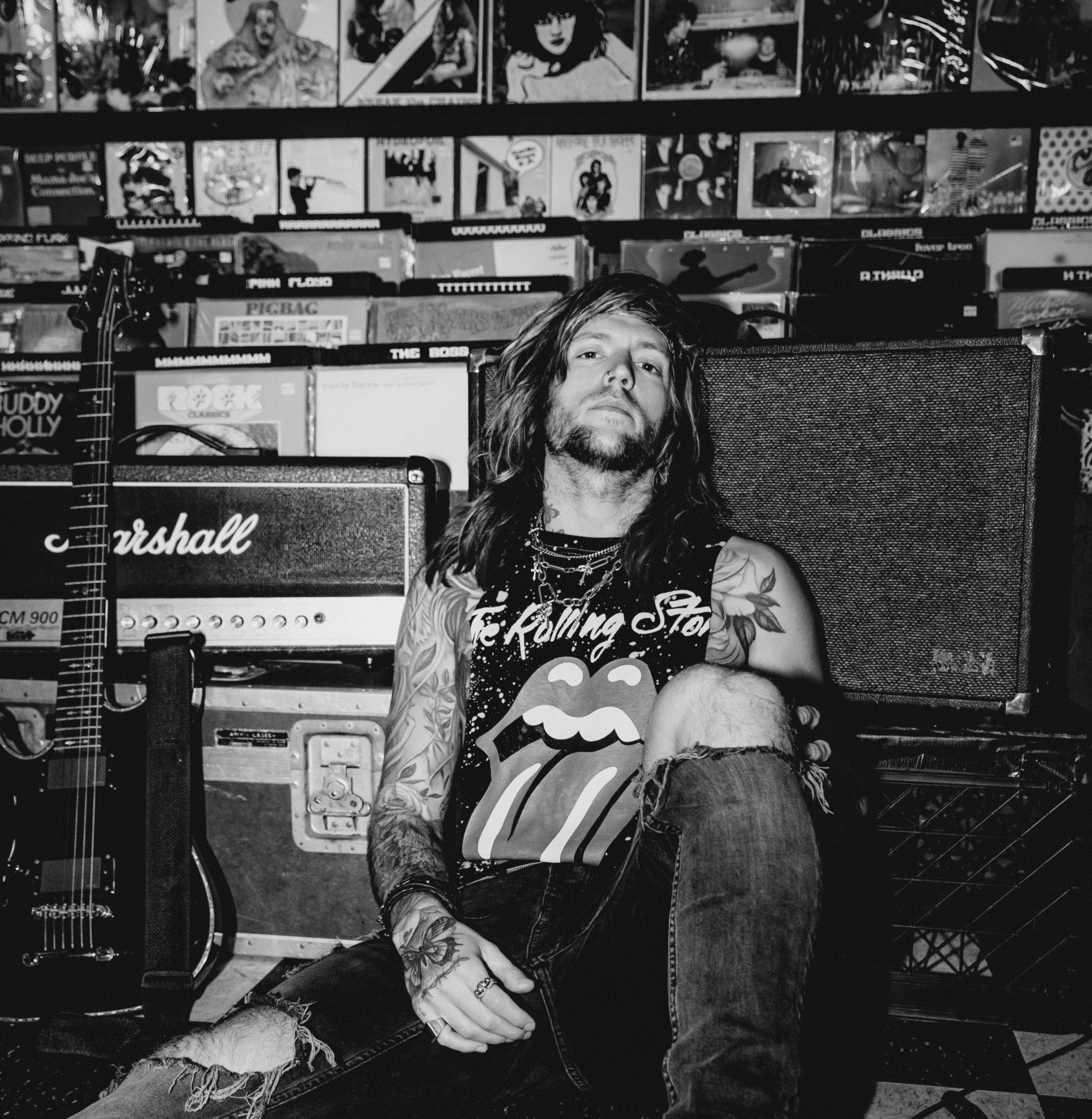
- Neffex in 2023

Background information
- Origin: Orange County, California, U.S.
- Genres: EDM; pop; electropop; indie pop; hip hop; rap rock; alternative rock
- Years active: 2014-present
- Labels: Burning Boat (Independent); NCS
- Members: Bryce Savage
- Past members: Cameron Wales
- Website: www.neffexmusic.com

YouTube information
- Channel: neffexmusic

Neffex (stylized as in all caps) is an American music project by Bryce Savage (born December 30, 1992), formerly by Cameron Wales (before 2021). They produced remixes and original songs characterized by a mixture of electronic and rap genres. While still a duo, Savage wrote the lyrics, produced the tracks, and sang the songs while Wales mixed and mastered them. They have released most of their songs royalty-free (under CC BY license) which have featured in media by content creators globally.

Fight Back (Official Video) - Neffex (CC BY 3.0)

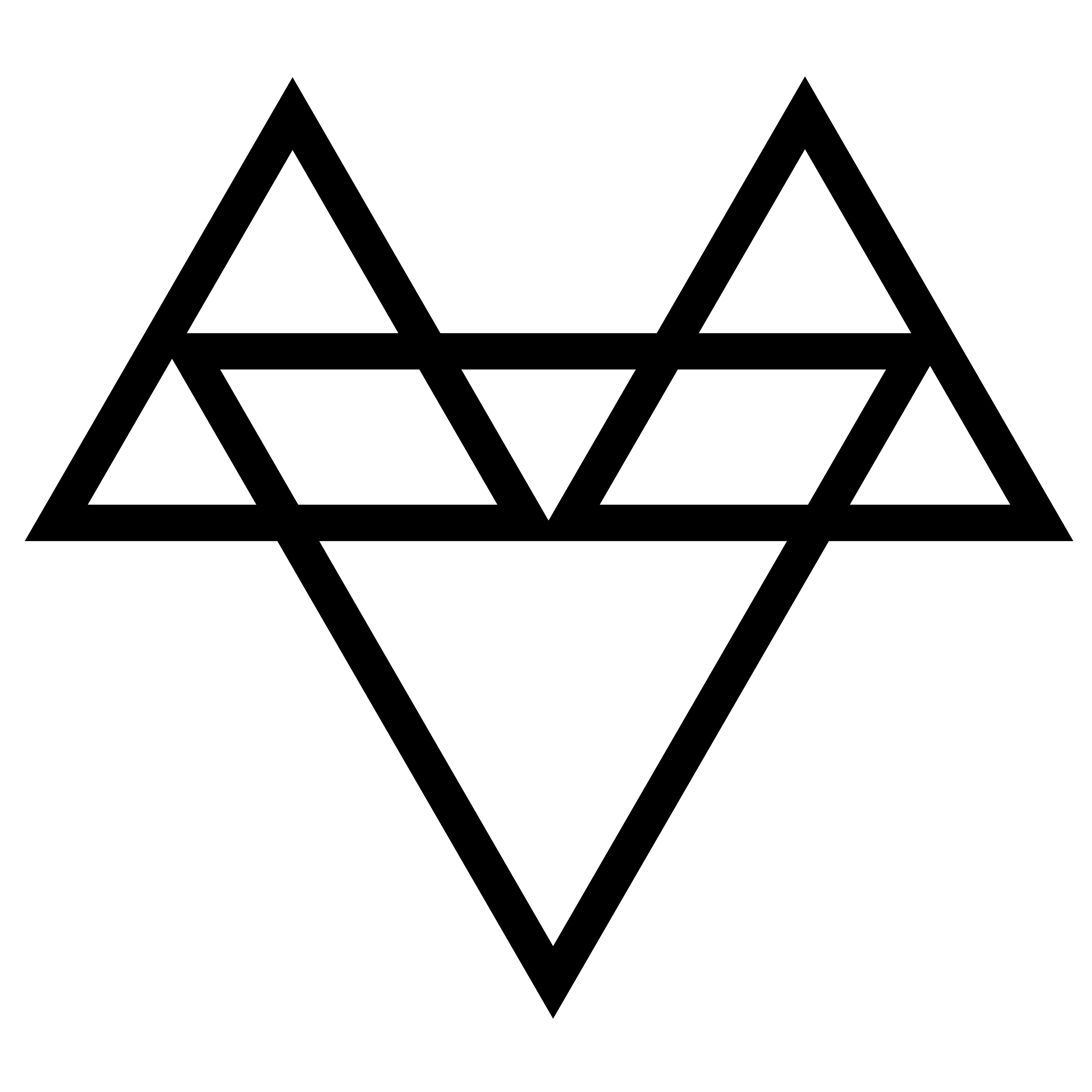
Logo of Neffex

== Origin ==
Bryce Savage (born Brandon Christopher Horth) and Cameron Wales first met in high school when they were 15 years old. At that time, they were involved in a punk rock band. Thereafter, both exited the band and started making their own music. However, this was not yet the creation of Neffex. After high school, Wales moved to Los Angeles, but kept in touch with Savage during college. When Savage was in the last year of college, he talked to Wales and they noticed both were making music in their free time. After college, they got together again, in Orange County, and created the name "Neffex" and the fox symbol. On his YouTube channel Savage exclaimed that the fox symbol was not the original intention; instead, he wanted to make something that was easy to replicate (similar to the infamous "cool S" style), and thus it consists of three triangles.

== Timeline ==
In 2017, the duo set up a challenge to release 100 songs in 100 weeks. All songs released for this challenge are royalty-free and resulted in a combined 2+ billion independent streams across platforms.

On October 16, 2019, they released their first EP titled Q203, named after the apartment where they recorded their first songs. The album has six songs: When I Was Young, Without You, It's My Life, Sunday, Primal, and Want Me. Shortly after, they embarked on their first tour, doing 13 cities across Europe throughout October/November of 2019.

On September 25, 2020, they released their debut album titled New Beginnings featuring Rozes, Jez Dior, and Masn.

On July 6, 2021, they mutually decided to part ways as Wales wanted to focus on a solo project, while Savage would continue with Neffex.

On July 7, 2021, Savage set up a challenge to release 100 songs in 100 weeks again and same as before, all songs released for this challenge are royalty-free.

On January 13, 2023, Neffex's single "Fight Back" was certified RIAA Gold.

On March 24, 2023, Bryce Savage released the tour dates for his "Born a Rockstar" tour spanning 25 cities across Europe and North America. The tour took place between September and December of 2023, with every single location being sold out by the end.

On June 1, 2023, Neffex's single "Rumors" was certified RIAA Gold.

Savage concluded his latest version of "100 songs in 100 weeks" of copyright-free singles on June 8, 2023; however, he has still released songs consistently since.
