= Through the Glass (EP) =

EP by Atlas Genius
- Released: 12 June 2012
- Recorded: 2011–12
- Genres: Alternative rock, indietronica, indie rock
- Label: Warner Bros.
- Producer: Atlas Genius

Atlas Genius chronology
Through the Glass (2012)	When It Was Now (2013)

Singles from Through the Glass
- 1. "Trojans" Released: 11 May 2012

Through the Glass is an extended play by Australian alternative rock band Atlas Genius. It was released on 12 June 2012 by Warner Bros. Records.

== Track listing ==
All tracks are written by Keith Jeffery, Michael Jeffery, Steven Jeffery and Darren Sell.

No.	Title	Length
1.	"Trojans"	3:36
2.	"Back Seat"	3:05
3.	"Symptoms"	3:19
4.	"Trojans" (Crown City Acoustic)	3:35

== Release history ==
Region	Date	Format	Label
Worldwide	12 June 2012	Digital download	Warner Bros.
