= Unbusted =

American rock band

- Origin: Martha's Vineyard
- Years active: 1997–present
- Label: Fenway Recordings
- Members: Joe Keefe - guitar/vocals Ben Smith - bass/vocals Seb Keefe - drums
- Past members: Dan Gaskill - drums - Jackson Sandland - guitar/vocals Willie Bailey - drums Tim Laursen - guitar/vocals

Unbusted is a three-piece rock band from Martha's Vineyard. The band released their debut album "Unbusted" in 1999 produced by JAM. You Are Young in the fall of 2007.

Unbusted has three songs on the soundtrack to the Farrelly Brothers’ film Stuck on You.

They have performed at SXSW and CMJ, toured with Juliana Hatfield and the indie rock band Some Girls, and have played with Doves, The Cribs, The Walkmen, and Cheap Trick.

== Discography ==
- Unbusted (1999) - Clearly Blue Eyes, Moving Up, Another Wasted Weekend
- Unbusted (demo, 1999) - I don't want to grow up, Seeds to sew, Another wasted weekend, Playing guitar, Let me go
- Gasoline (demo, 2003) - Breaking Off, Childish, Gasoline, Us And Them.
- You Are Young (Fenway Recordings, 2007)
