= Trojans (EP) =

EP by Atlas Genius
- Released: 25 February 2013
- Recorded: 2011–12
- Genre: Indietronica, indie rock
- Label: Warner Bros.
- Producer: Atlas Genius

Atlas Genius chronology
| When It Was Now (2013) | Trojans (2013) | So Electric: When It Was Now (The Remixes) (2013) |

Trojans is an extended play by Australian alternative rock band Atlas Genius. It was released as a 10" vinyl exclusively available in the United Kingdom on 25 February 2013. The vinyl is limited to 300 copies.

== Track listing ==
All tracks are written by Keith Jeffery, Michael Jeffery, Steven Jeffery and Darren Sell

Side one
| No. | Title | Producer(s) | Length |
|---|---|---|---|
| 1. | "Trojans" | Atlas Genius | 3:39 |
| 2. | "Back Seat" | Atlas Genius | 3:03 |

Side two
| No. | Title | Producer(s) | Length |
|---|---|---|---|
| 3. | "Trojans" (Lenno Remix) | Atlas Genius (remix and additional production by Lenno) | 4:41 |
| 4. | "Back Seat" (Goldroom Remix) | Atlas Genius (remix and additional production by Goldroom) | 3:51 |

== Release history ==
| Region | Date | Format | Label |
|---|---|---|---|
| United Kingdom | 25 February 2013 | LP record | Warner Bros. |
