= Inanimate Objects =

Studio album by Atlas Genius
- Released: 28 August 2015
- Recorded: Adelaide, South Australia and Studio City, California, 2014-2015
- Genres: Alternative rock, indietronica, synth-pop
- Length: 41:56
- Label: Warner Bros. Records
- Producers: Atlas Genius, Frederik Thaae

Atlas Genius chronology
So Electric: When It Was Now (The Remixes) (2013)	Inanimate Objects (2015)	Molecules Remix EP (2015)

Singles from Inanimate Object
- 1. "Molecules" Released: 23 June 2015; 2. "Stockholm" Released: 17 July 2015; 3. "Friends with Enemies" Released: 31 July 2015; 4. "A Perfect End" Released: 14 August 2015

Inanimate Objects is the second studio album by Australian alternative rock band, Atlas Genius, released through Warner Bros. Records on 28 August 2015. It peaked at No. 150 on the Billboard 200, and dropped off the chart in the following week. The album's first single, 'Molecules', was a modest hit on alternative radio and spent 22 weeks on Billboard's Alternative Airplay charts, peaking at #10 the week of 21 November 2015.

== Track listing ==
All tracks are written by Keith Jeffery, Michael Jeffery and Frederik Thaae.

No.	Title	Length
1.	"The Stone Mill"	3:39
2.	"Molecules"	4:32
3.	"Stockholm"	3:11
4.	"Refugees"	4:15
5.	"A Perfect End"	3:08
6.	"Friendly Apes"	4:10
7.	"Friends with Enemies"	3:47
8.	"Where I Belong"	3:59
9.	"Balladino"	4:00
10.	"The City We Grow"	3:51
11.	"Levitate"	3:24

iTunes edition bonus track

No.	Title	Length
12.	"Molecules" (Single Version)	4:09

== Personnel ==
Atlas Genius

- Keith Jeffery – vocals, guitar, bass, percussion, keyboards, drums, programming
- Michael Jeffery – drums, percussion, background vocals

Other musicians

- Frederik Thaae – guitar, bass, keyboards, drum programming, background vocals
- David Larson – keyboards
- Alan Wilkis – programming, background vocals
- Elyse Rogers – background vocals
- Carrie Keagan – background vocals
- Jonny Kaps – background vocals

Production

- Atlas Genius – production
- Frederik Thaae – production
- Big Data – additional production
- Jesse Shatkin – additional production
- Manny Marroquin – mixing
- Andrew Maury – mixing
- Mike Duncan – mixing assistant
- Chris Galland – mixing assistant
- Ike Schultz – mixing assistant
- Dylan Morgan – assistant engineer
- Joe LaPorta – mastering
- Kii Arens – cover art
- Donny Phillips – cover art
- Frank Maddocks – design, photography

== Charts ==
Chart (2015)	Peak position
US Billboard 200	150
US Top Alternative Albums (Billboard)	20
US Top Rock Albums (Billboard)	28
