= Hero (Family of the Year song) =

Single by Family of the Year

from the album Loma Vista and Boyhood: Music from the Motion Picture
- Released: October 12, 2012
- Genre: Indie rock, indie folk, indie pop
- Length: 3:10
- Label: Nettwerk
- Songwriter: Joseph Keefe
- Producers: Wax Ltd; Family of the Year

Family of the Year singles chronology
"Diversity" (2012)	"Hero" (2012)	"The Stairs" (2013)

"Hero" is a song by American indie rock band Family of the Year featured on their second studio album Loma Vista. It was released as the album's second single in 2012 through Nettwerk. The song was written by Joe Keefe, and it was produced by American production team Wax Ltd and Family of the Year. It first appeared on the band's 2010 EP Through The Trees in a shorter version.

"Hero" was prominently used in Richard Linklater's 2014 film Boyhood as well as its trailer. The song has also been used in the first season of Girls, the 2012 film Thanks for Sharing, the 2013 German film Frau Ella and has been featured in episodes of Degrassi: The Next Generation, Korean Drama It's Okay, That's Love, Sky Castle and VH1's Couples Therapy. It also features in the 2026 Netflix series "I Will Find You (miniseries)". The band has performed the song on talk shows including Jimmy Kimmel Live!, Conan and The Tonight Show with Jay Leno. The song was covered by Owen Danoff on Team Adam in the Live Playoffs of season 10 of The Voice (US).

== Track listing ==
European digital EP

1. "Hero" – 3:10
2. "Hero" (acoustic) – 3:13
3. "Buried" (acoustic) – 3:27
4. "She Wanted Someone Else" – 3:31

German, Austrian and Swiss CD single

1. "Hero" – 3:11
2. "Hero" (acoustic) – 3:13

== Charts ==
=== Weekly charts ===
Chart (2012–2016)	Peak; position
Austria (Ö3 Austria Top 40)	7
Belgium (Ultratip Bubbling Under Wallonia)	6
Belgium (Ultratop 50 Flanders)	6
Canada Hot 100 (Billboard)	61
Czech Republic Singles Digital (ČNS IFPI)	88
Germany (GfK)	7
Netherlands (Dutch Top 40)	18
Netherlands (Single Top 100)	20
Slovenia (SloTop50)	44
Spain (Promusicae)	72
Switzerland (Schweizer Hitparade)	6
UK Singles (Official Charts Company)	178
US Hot Rock & Alternative Songs (Billboard)	25
US Adult Alternative Airplay (Billboard)	1
US Adult Pop Airplay (Billboard)	40
US Alternative Airplay (Billboard)	12
US Rock & Alternative Airplay (Billboard)	13

=== Year-end charts ===
Chart (2013)	Position
Austria (Ö3 Austria Top 40)	70
Germany (Media Control AG)	42
US Hot Rock Songs (Billboard)	74
US Adult Alternative Songs (Billboard)	4
US Alternative Songs (Billboard)	38
US Rock Airplay (Billboard)	39

Chart (2014)	Position
Belgium (Ultratop 50 Flanders)	77
Netherlands (Dutch Top 40)	75
Netherlands (Single Top 100)	64
Switzerland (Schweizer Hitparade)	57

=== All-time charts ===
Chart (1995–2021)	Position
US Adult Alternative Songs (Billboard)	66

== Certifications ==
Region	Certification	Certified units/sales
Belgium (BRMA)	Gold	10,000^{‡}
Canada (Music Canada)	2× Platinum	160,000^{‡}
Denmark (IFPI Danmark)	Gold	45,000^{‡}
Germany (BVMI)	Platinum	300,000^{^}
Italy (FIMI)	Gold	25,000^{‡}
New Zealand (RMNZ)	Gold	15,000^{‡}
Spain (Promusicae)	Platinum	60,000^{‡}
Switzerland (IFPI Switzerland)	Gold	15,000^{^}
United Kingdom (BPI)	Silver	200,000^{‡}
United States (RIAA)	Platinum	1,000,000^{‡}
^{^} Shipments figures based on certification alone.^{‡} Sales+streaming figures based on certification alone.
