= When It Was Now =

Studio album by Atlas Genius
- Released: 19 February 2013
- Recorded: August – December 2012
- Studios: The Orchard, Adelaide, South Australia
- Genres: Alternative rock; indie rock; indietronica
- Length: 37:40
- Label: Warner Bros.
- Producers: Atlas Genius, Michael H. Brauer

Atlas Genius chronology
Through the Glass (2012)	When It Was Now (2013)	Trojans (2013)

Singles from When It Was Now
- 1. "Trojans" Released: 4 May 2011; 2. "If So" Released: 6 February 2013; 3. "Symptoms" Released: 3 May 2013

When It Was Now is the debut studio album by Australian alternative rock band Atlas Genius, released on 19 February 2013 by Warner Bros. Records. The album peaked at No. 34 on Billboard 200. It also reached No. 10 on the Top Alternative Albums chart. The only single from the album, "If So", reached No. 8 on the Billboard Alternative Songs chart. It has sold 79,000 copies in the United States as of August 2015.

== Recording and production ==
The band wrote, recorded and produced When It Was Now themselves at a studio they built in their hometown of Adelaide. It was mixed by Michael Brauer at Electric Lady Studios in New York City. They also recorded many of the final tracks in hotels in Chicago, Los Angeles and New York. In addition, some of the final mixing was done in London. Once their studio was built, the first song that Atlas Genius finished was "Trojans." The song went on to sell over 1,000 tracks per week in the States and soon had 45,000 downloads sold.

== Release and promotion ==
The album was released on iTunes and the band's website on 19 February 2013. The first single "If So" peaked to No. 8 and spent a consecutive 25 weeks on the Alternative Songs chart on Billboard. The single was also featured on the video game by EA Sports, FIFA 13 and was getting praised by Rolling Stone for its "solid sound". The song also got over 75,000 SoundCloud streams in two weeks. On February 20, 2013, the next single, "Symptoms", was iTunes' single of the week. The single "Trojans" peaked to No. 4 on both Billboard's Alternative Songs and Billboard Rock Airplay charts. It also spent an entire year on both Billboard's Alternative Songs chart. It sold nearly 300,000 tracks in the US alone. On May 3, 2013, "Symptoms" was released as a single.

On 17 July 2013, Atlas Genius announced tour dates for the North American "Ones To Watch" tour. The tour began Fall 2013. Atlas Genius performed 26 headlining concerts over a seven-week time span. They were joined on tour with Family of the Year and Dale Earnhardt Jr. Jr. and The Colourist.

== Reception ==
Professional ratings
Aggregate scores
Source	Rating
Metacritic	61/100
Review scores
Source	Rating
AllMusic	3.5/5 stars
Blurt	3/5 stars
Consequence of Sound	D
Rolling Stone	3/5 stars

The album received mixed to positive reviews for critics. Rolling Stone gave the When It Was Now 3 out of 5 stars, saying "These two Australian brothers deliver Phoenix-like dance pop that's so big on airy hooks that its lyrical lightheadedness isn't too much of a problem." Heather Phares from AllMusic said "When It Was Now is a solid debut that proves Trojans wasn't a fluke." However, Nick Freed from Consequence of Sound said "As it is, When It Was Now has three great songs, four decent, and four forgettable."

== Track listing ==
All tracks are written by Keith Jeffery, Michael Jeffery, Steven Jeffery, Darren Sell.

No.	Title	Length
1.	"Electric"	4:03
2.	"If So"	3:01
3.	"Back Seat"	3:03
4.	"Trojans"	3:39
5.	"Through the Glass"	3:52
6.	"On a Day"	3:27
7.	"Centred on You"	3:37
8.	"Don't Make a Scene"	2:43
9.	"All These Girls"	3:23
10.	"When It Was Now"	3:31
11.	"Symptoms"	3:21
Total length:		37:41

Deluxe Version
No.	Title	Length
12.	"Trojans" (Lenno Remix)	4:42
13.	"Back Seat" (Goldroom Remix)	3:54
14.	"If So" (Electric Lady Acoustic)	3:36
Total length:		49:13

== Charts ==
Chart (2013)	Peak position
US Billboard 200	34
US Top Alternative Albums (Billboard)	10
US Top Rock Albums (Billboard)	11
