= Atlas Genius =

Australian alternative rock band

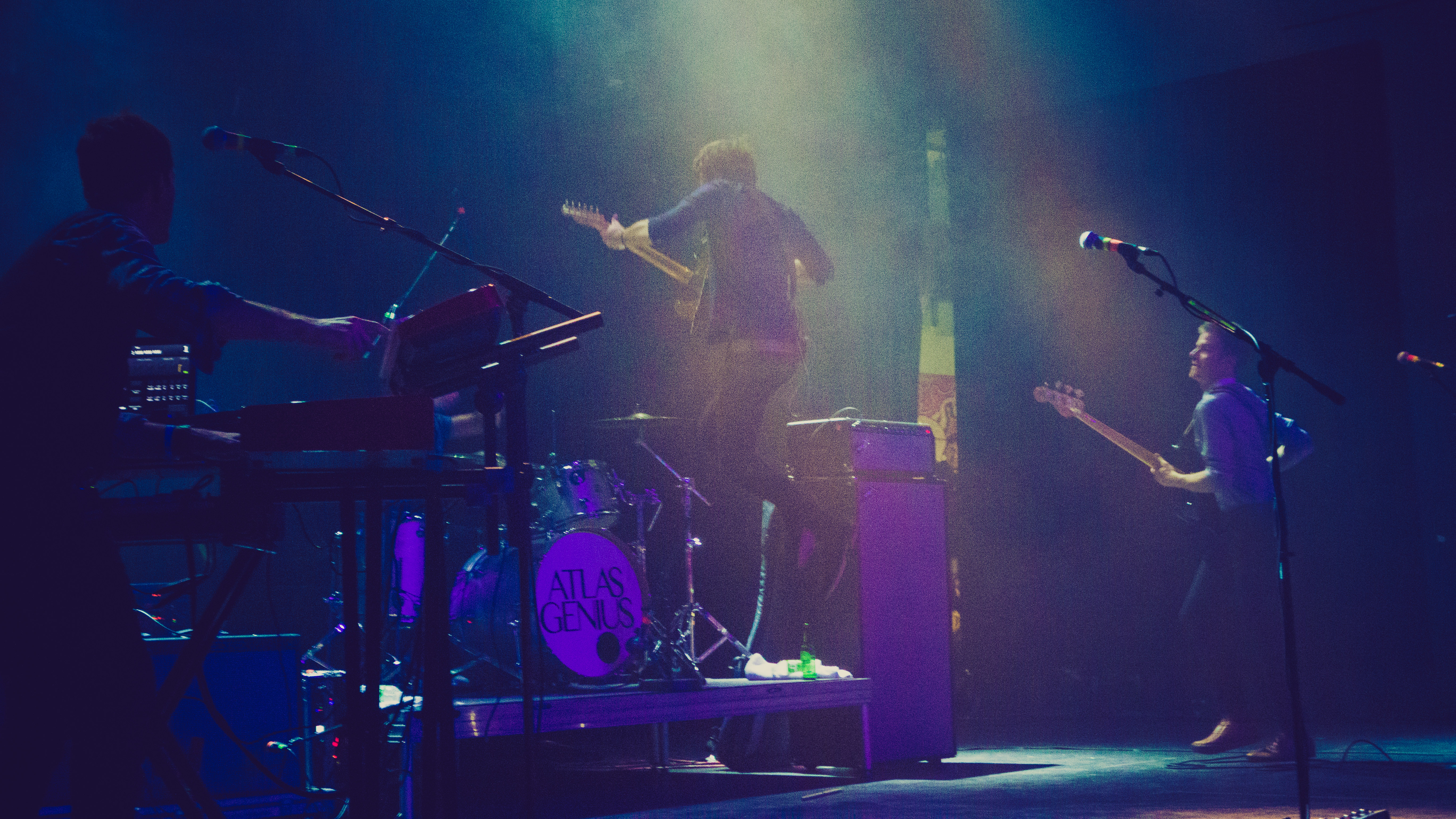
- Atlas Genius performing at Riverside, Austin, Texas, April 2013

Background information
- Origin: Adelaide, Australia
- Genres: Alternative rock; indie rock; indietronica
- Years active: 2009–present
- Label: Warner Bros.
- Members: Keith Jeffery; Michael Jeffery; Steven Jeffery; Dave Green
- Past members: Darren Sell
- Website: atlasgenius.com

Atlas Genius is an Australian alternative rock band formed in Adelaide, Australia in November 2009. The band's mainstay members are the Jeffery brothers, Keith on lead vocals and lead guitar; Michael on drums; and Darren Sell on keyboard. Their debut album, When It Was Now, was issued on 9 February 2013 and peaked at No. 34 on the United States Billboard 200. In 2013 two of their singles appeared on the related Alternative Songs Chart, "Trojans" (released in May 2011) at No. 4 and "If So" (February 2013) at No. 8. In 2013 the group toured the US in April and May, United Kingdom in May, and back to the US in August.

In 2015 they released their second studio album, Inanimate Objects.

== History ==
Atlas Genius formed in November 2009 in Adelaide by three brothers, Keith William Hamilton Jeffery (born 10 March 1982) on lead vocals and lead guitar; Steven Roger Jeffery on bass guitar; and Michael Douglas Jeffery on drums. The name was provided by Michael "[he] had a dream, and the name came to him in a dream". Their father had been a guitarist in his own high school band. They cleared out the family's garage and started building a recording studio. They were joined by English-born Darren Norman Sell on keyboards. According to Keith their influences include The Beatles, Death Cab for Cutie, Beck, The Police, and Phoenix: "[a]s far as the music is concerned, we like to have space, sections where it breathes ... [i]t's hard for us to define our style of music being that we're inside the songs. I've noticed a lot of reviewers calling it Indie/Pop though". They gained a residency at a local pub, The Lion, which helped raise funds for their home studio.

Their debut single, "Trojans", was released on 4 May 2011. It was co-written by all four members. They entered the track on national radio station Triple J's talent contest Unearthed's website. In the United States in June, "Trojans" received its first favorable review from Neon Gold's Andrew Hwang, who proclaimed that, "[the group] knocks on your door and creeps into your peripheries in stealth mode" and that the single "approaches Phoenix-esque levels of infectiousness". By September that year, it was placed on high rotation by satellite radio station SiriusXM's Alt Nation channel.

In the US, an acoustic version of "Trojans" premiered on MTV2's show 120 Minutes on 13 January 2012. It was filmed by Mike and only features Keith on guitar and vocals. Other reviewers called the single "slick" and "a solid summer jam" with "melancholy introspection" and "finger-snapping funk". In early 2013 it peaked at No. 4 on Billboard's Alternative Songs Chart. The single also reached No. 17 on its Rock Songs and No. 15 on Heatseekers Songs Charts. The track received airplay from XFM and Radio One in the UK and reached No. 82 on the Alternative Airplay Chart.

The group were signed to Warner Bros. Records which released their three-track extended play, Through the Glass, on 12 June 2012. By that time Steven had left and the group continued as a trio with Keith and Michael Jeffery and Sell. To support the EP they provided a music video for another track, "Symptoms", which was directed by Claire Marie Vogel and featured on Vimeo as a staff pick. The band embarked on a US and Canada tour during August and September 2012.

On 9 February 2013 Atlas Genius issued their debut album, When It Was Now, which peaked at No. 34 on the US Billboard 200. Heather Phares, writing for Allmusic, described its "songwriting is so direct and intimate ... [which] sets them apart from many of their contemporaries" however "[w]hen the writing doesn't match the standard set by the strongest songs, the album lags a little". Drum Media's Dylan Stewart felt the "sound across the 11 tracks ... is incredibly diverse ... where tribal drums will have feet tapping and heads bopping, and plenty of tunes that will find themselves on beer commercials next summer as the soundtrack to pretty young hipsters on rooftops".

Their second single, "If So", also appeared in February 2013. It reached No. 8 on Billboard's Alternative Songs Chart. It is featured in FIFA 13. Early in 2013 the group toured with Steven unavailable. In May that year Keith described the line-up as "Michael is my brother, the drummer. And we have [Darren] a keyboard player from England. And currently we have a bass player ... He's a Californian, a man of many talents, we met him, last year". Tour dates were in the US in April and May, UK in May, Australia in July, and back to the US in August. In June they indicated that after touring they were due to enter their studio to begin work on a second album.

In March 2015, the band finished recording their 2nd album.

On 23 June 2015, the band revealed a new single, "Molecules", and announced the release date for their new album, Inanimate Objects, out 28 August 2015.

On 27 July 2017, the band revealed a new single, "63 Days", and announced a North American tour with special guests Magic Giant, Flor, and Half the Animal.

== Band members ==
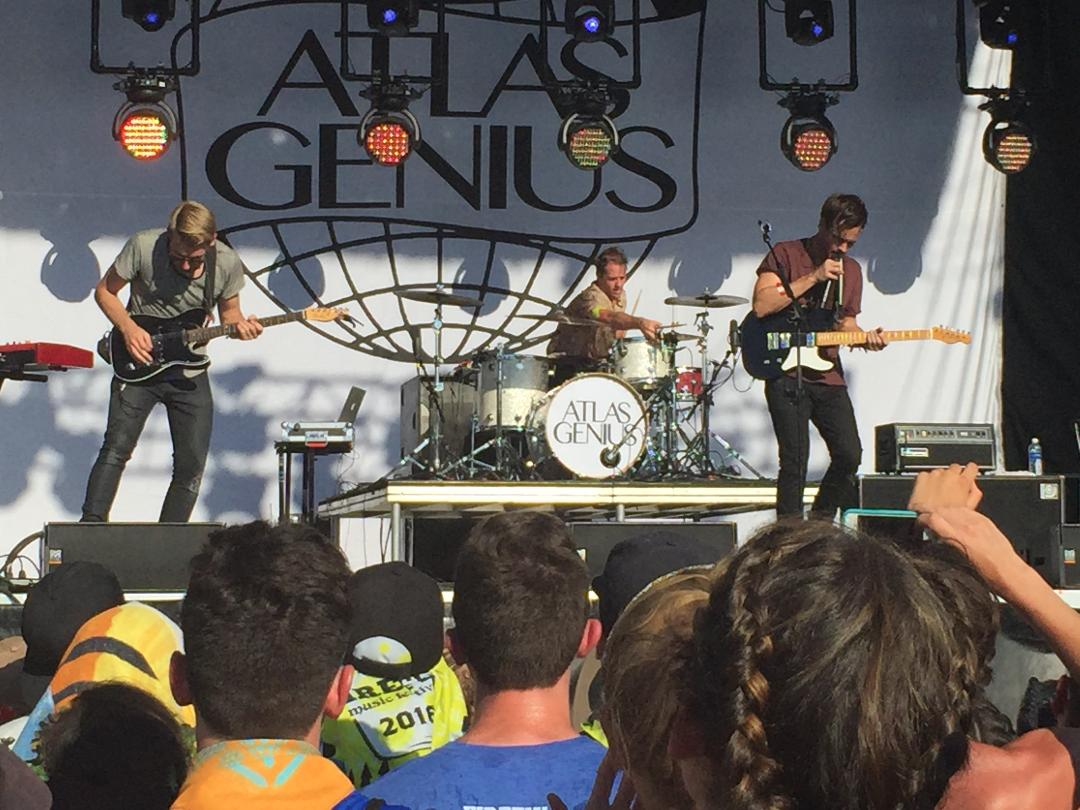
Atlas Genius performing at Firefly Music Festival in June 2016

=== Current members ===
- Keith Jeffery – lead vocals, guitar (2009–present)
- Michael Jeffery – drums (2009–present)
- Steven Jeffery - synth/keys (2016–present)
- Dave Green - guitar (2016–present)

=== Former members ===
- Darren Sell – keys, vocals (2009–2013)

=== Touring members ===
- Mikey "the kid" Wagner - bass, vocals (2018–present)

=== Former touring members ===
- Kevin McPherson - bass (2012–2014)
- Matt Fazzi – guitar, keys, vocals (2015–2016)
- Alex Marans - bass, keys, vocals (2015–2016)
- Josh Rheault - guitar, keys, vocals (2017)
- Daniel Curcio - bass, vocals (2017–present)

== Discography ==
Studio albums

- When It Was Now (2013)
- Inanimate Objects (2015)
- End of the Tunnel (2024)

== See also ==
- List of alternative rock artists
- List of current Warner Bros. Records artists
- List of indie rock musicians
- List of people from Adelaide
