= Yu-Gi-Oh! 5D's season 5 =

Yu-Gi-Oh! 5D's: Fight for the Future
- Season 5
- No. of episodes: 20 (only 2 dubbed)

Release
- Original network: TV Tokyo
- Original release: November 17, 2010 – March 30, 2011

Season chronology
- ← Previous; Season 4 Next → Yu-Gi-Oh! Zexal; Season 1

The fifth and final season of Yu-Gi-Oh! 5D's lasts from episodes 135 to 154 (with the title Fight for the Future, in the English dub). As the Ark Cradle (also known as the "Divine Temple") descends on New Domino City, the final stage of Yliaster's plan is set into motion. This season uses four pieces of theme music. For episodes 130 to 154, the opening theme is "Road to Tomorrow – Going My Way!" (明日への道 Going My Way!, Ashita heno Michi – Going My Way!) by Masaaki Endoh, while the ending theme is "Future Colors" (みらいいろ, Miraiiro) by Plastic Tree. Certain episodes use the insert song: "Clear Mind" by Masaaki Endoh. Episode 154 uses the insert song: "The Melody of Promises," which is also by Masaaki Endoh.

Yu-Gi-Oh! 5D's was licensed in North America by 4Kids Entertainment, and Seasons 4 and 5 was aired on 4Kids' Toonzai block between February 19 – September 10, 2011. However, a total of 31 episodes were left out (from Seasons 4 and 5) from the original Japanese broadcast, with the English dubbed series ending on September 10, 2011. This was due to a lawsuit from TV Tokyo, though 4Kids claimed that it was due to low ratings.

The official Yu-Gi-Oh! YouTube channel counts the third season, the 29 dubbed episodes of the fourth season and the two dubbed episodes of this season as Season 2.

== Episode list ==
No. overall	No. in season	Title	Written by	Original release date	American air date
135	1	"Fight for the Future (Part 1) / The Devil of Despair! Machine Divine Emperor Mechanicle Infinity Cubic"; Transliteration: "Zetsubō no Majin! Kikōshin Mashinikuru Infiniti Kyūbikku" (Japanese: 絶望の魔人！ 機皇帝マシニクルインフィニティ・キュービック)	Toshifumi Kawase	November 17, 2010	September 10, 2011
After introducing himself, the Yliaster trio's Duel Runners combine to form Aporia's duel runner. Aporia then combines with it in such a way, that the audience are shocked to the point that they begin wondering if he was human at all. Aporia then activates the continuous trap card, Infinite Prison, so that by sending the trap, Infinity Force from his hand to the Graveyard, he can treat Grand Core as a spell card from the graveyard, and then set it face-down in his Spell/Trap Zone. He then destroys Infinite Prison in order to add Sky Core, Wise Core, and Grand Core to his hand, which had been set face-down. Next, Aporia sends the 3 Machine Emperor Cores to the graveyard, in order to activate the trap card: Machine Emperor Creation, which allows him to Special Summon his ace monster, Machine Divine Emperor Mechanicle Infinity Cubic. Then, he causes his Machine Divine Emperor to shoot energy into the sky, which results in lightning striking all over New Domino City. Aporia then has his Machine Divine Emperor absorb Shooting Star Dragon, after he sends Granel Guard 3 to the graveyard to allow Mechanicle to negate Shooting Star Dragon's ability, which increases Mechanicle's attack points from 4,000 to 7,300. Then, Aporia shows more visions of the future in 200 years, in which he, in the human form of Jakob, is one of the last 4 survivors of a global Ener-D explosion and a Machine Emperor Genocide. He is approached by Z-ONE (whose actual name is Yliadus), Paradox, and Bruno (in his Vizor adult form), who are the last human survivors on Earth, who agree to work together to try to prevent the disasters from occurring. (This happens after the end of the Machine Emperors-Synchro Monsters War.) But one by one, after Aporia makes Z-ONE into a God-like being with the help of Vizor and Paradox (after they realize that they could not survive forever), Paradox and Vizor, and even Aporia all die, leaving Z-ONE as the only survivor. Shortly before his death, Aporia begs Z-ONE to resurrect him and send him to the past, in the form of his 3 main counterparts, in order to change the future for the better. After the vision is shown, Aporia activates Mechanicle's special ability, which allows him to send an absorbed monster to the graveyard during his end phase, and inflict damage equal to the absorbed monster's attack points, which is 3,300. Yusei then destroys Shooting Star Dragon with the trap, Wild Tornado, and then is able to revive the dragon, with all of its abilities negated, though now it will be no longer treated as a Synchro Monster. But Yusei is now in a desperate situation, as Aporia attacks Yusei with Mechanicle, using the special ability of Wisel Attack 5, which will inflict damage equal to the difference of Mechanicle's and Shooting Star Dragon's attack points, doubled. When Yusei says that he can negate Mechanicle's attack, Aporia then states that the trap, Scrap-Iron Scarecrow will be useless to protect Yusei from the attack, because when Mechanicle attacks, the special ability of Wisel Attack 5 will allow Aporia to negate and destroy a trap.
136	2	"Victory or Doom (Part 2) / A Do-or-Die Battle! The Machine Divine Emperor VS The Synchro Monsters"; Transliteration: "Kesshi no Kōbō! Kikōshin Vāsasu Shinkuro Monsutā" (Japanese: 決死の攻防！ 機皇神VSシンクロモンスタ)	Yoshifumi Fukushima	November 24, 2010	September 10, 2011
As Yusei faces against Aporia's attack, Jack and Crow come to join him, despite their injuries. They then provide the traps that Yusei needs in order to reflect Mechanicle's attack. But when Aporia negates Mechanicle's destruction, his life points are reduced from 3,900 to 3,400. Yusei then Special Summons Scar-Red Nova Dragon and Black-Winged Dragon, in order to give Shooting Star Dragon attack points up to 9,600. But Aporia manages to counter Yusei's strategy, and has his Machine Divine Emperor Mechanicle Infinity Cubic negate the attack, and absorb both dragons, which increases the Machine Divine Emperor's attack points from 4,000 to 10,300. Aporia then uses a trap, which reduces Yusei's life points from 2,800 down to 400, and allows his life points to rise back up from 3,400 to 4,000. However, thanks to the wishes of the Signers, Yusei is able to draw the cards he need that are in their possession. Then, Yusei re-summons the two dragons, and special summons Shooting Star Dragon as a Synchro Monster, and now has the 3 Signer Dragons back on his side of the field. As a result, Mechanicle's attack points drop from 10,300 back down to 4,000. But despite this, Yusei is still in a desperate situation, as Aporia still has the upper hand of the duel. (The 4Kids dub of this episode features part of the following episode, up to after Aporia's defeat and Team 5D's victory celebrations. The "Divine Temple" disappears, and Yusei states at the end, "And now history and the future are safe forever.")
137	3	"An Approaching Terror – The Citadel of God, "The Ark Cradle""; Transliteration: "Semarikuru Kyōfu Kami no Kyojō Āku Kureidoru" (Japanese: 迫りくる恐怖神の居城「 アーククレイドル」)	Shin Yoshida	December 1, 2010	N/A
Yusei uses the special ability of Black-Winged Dragon to weaken Machine Divine Emperor Mechanicle Infinity Cube's attack points, and Aporia's life points, both down from 4,000 to 2,600. Then, Yusei defeats Aporia, using the combined might of the 3 Signer Dragons, which causes him to crash into the sea. Resultingly, Team 5D's wins the WRGP finals. Then, the red sky returns to its blue color, and the lightning strikes stop. Then, Team 5D's celebrates their victory during noontime. However, their victory is short-lived, as the Infinity Circuit has been completed by the Ener-D from the duel, and the Ark Cradle breaks through the sky from the "distorted dimension," beginning to descend towards New Domino City. To make matters worse, at the rate that the Ark Cradle is descending towards New Domino city, they have only 12 hours to stop the Ark Cradle until it reaches the city. When the Ark Cradle collides with the city's Ener-D generator, it will unleash a deadly shock wave from the impact, and a massive blast of negative Ener-D, which will destroy New Domino, Satellite, and everything else within the surrounding areas (which is basically everything within 30 miles of the Ark Cradle), which would be another Zero Reverse event on a much larger scale. However, the time required to evacuate everybody within those areas is predicted to take at least 20 hours. They also discover that the Ener-D generator of the Ark Cradle is producing negative Ener-D, which is causing all of New Domino City's Ener-D generators to spin in reverse, which shuts down all Ener-D powered devices in the city. This causes a big problem, as all of New Domino City's Duel Runners are powered by Ener-D, which are some of the residents' only means of vehicular travel. The descent of the Ark Cradle also causes panic in New Domino City, Satellite, and the surrounding areas. As a safety precaution, Lazar orders the evacuation of those areas to the nearest cities that are out of the Ark Cradle's destruction range, even though the odds are against them. Upon further examination of the Ark Cradle, Yusei discovers that the Ark Cradle is actually the futuristic version of Satellite, yet upside down. They also learn that if the Ark Cradle's Ener-D generator is reversed to generate positive energy, there is a chance to stop it. By this, Team 5D's and Team Ragnarok decide to work together in order to stop the impending destruction. Despite the power outages, the Signers and Team Ragnarok can still power their duel runners, using the power of the Signer Marks, and their Rune Eyes. However, as they prepare to enter the Ark Cradle, Sherry contacts them, and warns Yusei that Z-ONE has shown her the future, which reveals that if he comes to the Ark Cradle, then he will die! Unknown to everyone, Aporia has survived the crash, and has been brought aboard the Ark Cradle. Z-ONE approaches Aporia, saying that he still needs his power. Aporia sadly tells Z-ONE that he had failed in his plan to bring the Ark Cradle over to New Domino City, and that instead, the Signers had won. Z-ONE then objects to this, by telling Aporia that he had succeeded in his plan, because the Infinity Circuit (also known as the Grand Design) has been completed, and that the Ark Cradle has appeared above New Domino City. ZONE also tells Aporia that something has disrupted their plan, which has resulted in another change of the future. Then, Z-ONE asks Aporia if he is willing to help him fix that problem, to which Aporia says yes, stating that Z-ONE is his "eternal friend." Then, Aporia's eyes glow red, as tools extend from Z-ONE's mechanical form to begin repairing Aporia's body.
138	4	"The Suspension Bridge Towards the Future – The Rainbow Bridge Bitfrost!"; Transliteration: "Mirai eno Kakehashi – Niji no Hashi Bifuresuto" (Japanese: 未来への架け橋 虹の橋ビフレスト)	Shin Yoshida	December 8, 2010	N/A
Sherry reveals that Z-ONE has shown her the future, and insists that Yusei not board the Ark Cradle, revealing she has switched sides to join Z-ONE, since she was convinced that Yliaster's plan was the only was to prevent the global destruction in the future. She also reveals that now having joined Z-ONE, she will do everything in her power to stop him. Despite this knowledge, Yusei still wants to do something to save the city. Sherry then reports to Z-ONE that Yusei did not heed her warning. When Z-ONE asks why she warned him, Sherry simply replies that the warning will cause Yusei to do something, which would allow her to kill Yusei herself, like to promised herself to. Yusei is then approached by Team Ragnarok whom, with the help of Bruno, manage to use the old Ener-D reactor and the Nordic Gods to create a path from Daedelus Bridge to the Ark Cradle. Yusei wants to go on his own; however, the rest of Team 5D's decide to join him, with Bruno following them in his Vizor form. Herald then activates the Rainbow Bridge Bifrost spell card to help support the bridge. Before Yusei boards the Ark Cradle, he looks to the spirit of Rex Goodwin, his hero, for help on what he should do. As Team Ragnarok becomes unable to maintain the bridge, Yusei and Bruno help Akiza, and Luna reach the Ark Cradle safely, and then they join Jack, Crow, and Leo, who have already reached the Ark Cradle before them. However, upon arriving the Ark Cradle's roof, they fall into a trap that was set by Z-ONE. As a result, the crew falls through a hole in the floor, and gets separated. Then, they all begin the long fall towards the deep interior of the Ark Cradle.
139	5	"The Enchanting Field – École de Zone!"; Transliteration: "Genwaku no Fīrudo! Ekōru do Zōn" (Japanese: 幻惑のフィールド エコール・ド・ゾーン！)	Kenichi Yamashita	December 15, 2010	N/A
Team 5D's, and their friends all survive the fall, but get separated into three groups: Yusei with Bruno, Crow with Akiza, and Jack with Leo and Luna. The narrow platforms on which they land on are revealed to be routes leading to the three planetary gears powering the main Ener-D generator, eventually leading to the Center Gear, which is what they are looking for. Vizor tells them that if they don't reach all 3 gears, then they won't be able to reach the Center Gear, and the Ener-D generator of the Ark Cradle would continue to produce negative energy, which would result in the destruction of New Domino City. Crow and Akiza arrive first at one of the 3 gears, which was the one that was closest to them. But then, they are confronted by Sherry, who reveals that she joined Z-ONE because he offered her the chance to grant her wish, challenging them to a duel. Sherry then reveals that her wish is that Z-ONE would bring back her happy days with her family. Crow gives the Z-ONE spell card back to Sherry, saying that she had wanted them to carry out her revenge for her. Sherry then tells Crow not to talk like that, as she says that she has changed, and that Crow doesn't understand what she has learned from Z-ONE. She then reveals that Z-ONE is a special spell card that was given to her by her parents in her teddy bear as a child. She also reveals that this special card was the reason why Yliaster had her parents killed, and was also the reason why they chased her all the way from France to New Domino City, since for some reason, Yliaster wanted the Z-ONE spell card. Sherry then activates the field spell, École de Zone, which traps them in an illusion that makes think that they are fighting two different Sherrys, while in reality they are actually fighting each other. In the duel, Battle Royale Mode is activated, which makes the battle damage real, and allows any player in the duel to attack any other player. Akiza soon to figure this out, and manages to summon Black Rose Dragon, and she destroys the illusion by activating Black Rose Dragon's special ability, which destroys all cards on the field, including itself. However, this also activates Sherry's special spell card, Z-ONE, which was set as one of her face-down cards, as its destruction allows her to treat Z-ONE as another one of her spell cards and activate it on the field (at the expense of removing from play the original card). Then, Sherry activates the effect of Z-ONE, stating that the power her parents entrusted to her would lead them to oblivion.
140	6	"The Soul-Binding Gate! The Sealed Future!"; Transliteration: "Konbakumon! Fūjirareta Mirai!" (Japanese: 魂縛門！ 封じられた未来！)	Kenichi Yamashita	December 22, 2010	N/A
Sherry reveals that Z-ONE promised to rewrite her past, so that her parents would never have died if she carried out his plans. She uses the Z-ONE spell card to activate the effects of the Soul-Binding Gate field spell, which inflicts 800 points of damage to each player whenever any of them try to summon monsters with a lower number of attack points than Sherry's life points (the summoned monster is also destroyed). As Akiza and Crow defend each other from Sherry's attacks, Sherry tempts Crow with the offer of using Z-ONE's power to change the past, so that Zero Reverse would never happen, so the children of Satellite wouldn't have been orphans, including Crow, Yusei, and Jack, if he surrenders and joins Z-ONE. However, Akiza reminds Crow that he should instead fight for their future, as that was what they as Signers should do. Then, they summon their respective dragons, and use their combined strength to defeat Sherry, which causes the 1st gear to stop rotating. The room collapses on them from the force of the attack, but Akiza manages to regain her psychic powers, and is able to get Black Rose Dragon to protect them. Later, Akiza heals them with her psychic powers. Sherry then remembers the words her father told her, and apologizes for her actions, deciding to team up with Akiza and Crow against Z-ONE and the rest of Yliaster, joining Team 5D's once again.
141	7	"The Duel of Despair! Fortissimo the Mobile Fortress!"; Transliteration: "Zetsubō no Dyueru! Kidō Yōsai Foruteshimo!" (Japanese: 絶望のデュエル！ 起動要塞フォルテシモ！)	Yasuyuki Suzuki	December 28, 2010	N/A
Jack, Leo, and Luna reach the second gear, where they are shocked to see that Aporia has survived the crash, and that he is waiting for them. He forcefully attaches devices onto them, which pierce into their hearts whenever they take damage from the duel, meaning that they will die if their life drops to zero, with the only way of removing them being to defeat him in a three-on-one duel. Aporia activates the field spell Fortissimo the Mobile Fortress, and combines with it. Aporia also sets a trap which blasts players with real damage whenever they summon monsters. Although Leo promises to protect Luna and help Jack, Aporia counters each of his traps, making things worse for his allies. Furthermore, Aporia's attacks leave both Jack and Luna in critical states, leaving Leo in despair.
142	8	"A Life-or-Death Battle! Machine Divine Emperor Dragon Asterisk"; Transliteration: "Seishi o Kaketa Tatakai! Kikōshinryū Asuterisuku" (Japanese: 生死を懸けた闘い！ 機皇神龍アステリスク)	Yasuyuki Suzuki	January 5, 2011	N/A
As Jack, Leo, and Luna struggle to survive, Aporia summons his key monster, Machine Divine Emperor Dragon Asterisk, which will inflict 1,000 points of damage to anyone who tries to Synchro Summon. Lamenting that he hasn't been able to protect anyone, Leo risks some of his own life points to protect Jack and Luna and weaken Asterisk. Leo then summons Power Tool Dragon and Ancient Fairy Dragon for Jack and Luna, and gets hit by the 4,800 points of effect damage, bringing his life points down to zero, causing him to die. The shock of Leo's death causes Luna to have a heart attack and puts her in a critical state, with her life points gradually dropping on their own, due to her weakening pulse. However, Leo comes back to life with 100 life points, thanks to Ancient Fairy Dragon and his Morphtronic Lighton's effect, and becomes the sixth and final Signer, now bearing the Mark of the Crimson Dragon's Heart. Noticing that Luna's life is in danger, with her life points now down to 18, Leo calls upon the Crimson Dragon's power and Synchro Summons Power Tool Dragon's true form, Life Stream Dragon, the sixth Signer Dragon.
143	9	"The Miracle of Life! Life Stream Dragon!!"; Transliteration: "Inochi no Kiseki, Raifu Sutorīmu Doragon!!" (Japanese: 命の奇跡！ ライフ・ストリーム・ドラゴン!!)	Yasuyuki Suzuki, Toshifumi Kawase	January 12, 2011	N/A
Leo uses Life Stream Dragon to counter Asterisk's and Fortissimo's damage effects, and to restore everyone's life points to 2,000 (except for Aporia), which puts Luna out of the danger of dying. Seeing that his efforts to inflict damage to the Signers has failed, Aporia gets extremely agitated, with Aporia cursing at them when Leo challenges his ideas of despair. Aporia then activates a trap to prevent Synchro Monsters from attacking, but Luna uses Ancient Fairy Dragon's ability to destroy his field spell, and activate one of her own that supports Synchro Monsters, allowing Jack to bring out Scar-Red Nova Dragon. The destruction of Fortissimo causes the fortress' structure to shake violently and begin to collapse. Aporia manages to bring out Machine Divine Emperor Mechanicle Infinity Cubic to increase Asterisk's attack points, but Leo and Luna use their traps and dragons' abilities to weaken Asterisk. Jack then destroys Asterisk by attacking with Scar-Red Nova Dragon, which defeats Aporia. However, while falling to his "doom", Aporia discovers that he has developed a feeling of hope in his heart. Then, the second gear stops spinning. Meanwhile, Yusei and Bruno arrive at the third gear, where Bruno is enveloped by Ener-D lights sent there by Z-ONE, which restores his memory. Afterwards, Bruno, who now refers to himself as Antinomy, reveals his true identity to Yusei, saying that he has remembered his true mission to protect Ark Cradle, and his allegiance to Z-ONE, announcing himself as Yusei's opponent. This hurts Yusei's feelings, but his desire to save New Domino City gives him the strength to fight against his former friend. Then, Antinomy opens a portal with his duel runner, and two begin a Turbo Duel in space, the loser of which will be swallowed by a star, and disappear in it forever.
144	10	"The Beginning of the End: A Struggle to the Death for the Future!"; Transliteration: "Shūen no Kigen Mirai no Tame no Shitō!" (Japanese: 終焉の起源 未来の為の死闘！)	Toshifumi Kawase	January 19, 2011	N/A
Yusei not only has to deal with Antinomy, but also the flames coming from the star. Antinomy brings out his Accel Synchro monster, Tech Genus Blade Blaster, and deals a lot of damage to Yusei. Antinomy reveals his days as a champion Turbo Duelist, before the Machine Emperors destroyed the world. It is revealed that his real name was Johnny, and that he had once enjoyed dueling before his manager informed him that Synchro Summoning was outlawed. Johnny has protested that Synchro Summoning was used by Yusei Fudo, who had brought hope to countless people. Just then, a crew member informed them that the main network was going berserk, as a result of the Ener-D's interactions with Synchro Summoning. Shortly afterwards, the Machine Emperors arrived and nearly wiped out the entire city. Johnny wandered the ruins of the city alone and wondered if Synchro Summoning had really brought about the destruction of the city. A Machine Emperor Grannel appeared and held a cannon to his face, but Johnny was ready to accept his fate. However, he was rescued by Z-ONE (who is actually the future version of Yusei). Seeing that Z-ONE still had hope (before the events of the Ark Cradle), and that he had none, Johnny had felt ashamed, and joined Aporia and Paradox as one of the 4 remaining survivors. He then accepted the codename of Antinomy and lived his life working with Z-ONE on his experiments to save humankind, by attempting to dispose of the Ener-D core that had destroyed the world, and by attempting to restore the world to the way it used to be. However, these experiments failed, and he died of old age, before being revived as a cyborg. Antinomy was sent back in time, with the mission to teach Yusei the Accel Synchro, in order to provide the power needed to bring Ark Cradle to New Domino City. Yusei summons Shooting Star Dragon and regains some ground, but then Antinomy performs a new and more advanced Accel Synchro using three Synchro Monsters, known as the Delta Accel Synchro, to summon his ace monster, Tech Genus Halberd Cannon, which has 4,000 attack and defense points. But the energy used to perform the Delta Accel Synchro causes the star to go Supernova, and the star turns into a Black Hole, with Yusei screaming at the force of the explosion. Antinomy then tells Yusei that Tech Genus Halberd Cannon was a Delta Accel Synchro Monster, a monster exceeding that of an Accel Synchro Monster.
145	11	"Faster Than Light!!"; Transliteration: "Hikari yori mo Hayaku" (Japanese: 光より速く!!)	Toshifumi Kawase	January 26, 2011	N/A
Yusei is put in a desperate situation, as Tech Genus Halberd Cannon brings his life points down to 100, and keeps him from summoning monsters. Furthermore, the Black Hole becomes more organized, and begins to approach from behind, threatening to suck Yusei in if he falls behind. However, Yusei manages to summon out Balance Shooter, which gives Shooting Star Dragon the power to overwhelm Halberd Cannon and defeat Antinomy. The impact of the attack causes a part of Antinomy's glasses to break. As they are sucked into the black hole, Antinomy asks Yusei to master the Delta Accel Synchro and save the world, and remembers his fond memories as Bruno, back when he was still Yusei's friend. Remembering this, Bruno tosses Yusei his broken glasses, and then he sacrifices himself to get Yusei out of the black hole, and back to the Ark Cradle with his D-Wheel exploding & killing Bruno shortly after. Then, the 3rd gear stops spinning, and Yusei grieves over the loss of Bruno, who was once his friend.
146	12	"The Last Person – Z-ONE"; Transliteration: "Saigo no Hitori Zōn" (Japanese: 最後の一人 Z-ONE)	Yoshifumi Fukushima	February 2, 2011	N/A
With the 3rd gear stopped, the Signers gain access to the Center Gear, and Yusei rejoins the others, telling them the truth about Antinomy, and about the Delta Accel Synchro method. They continue onwards to the center of the Ark Cradle, where they spot more, but smaller gears, as well as the Ener-D Generator that was called the Center Gear, which was powering most of the negative Ener-D of the Ark Cradle. Then, they enter a room with blue walls, located at the very heart of the Ark Cradle, where ZONE awaits them. Z-ONE reveals he was behind the Zero Reverse incident, as well as Paradox's scheme, to try to stop the existence of Synchro Monsters, and Ener-D. Z-ONE then decides to settle things in a duel, and if Yusei wins, the Center Gear would stop working (the Center Gear is really the key Ener-D generator, which is the main source of power for the Ark Cradle's overall Ener-D Generator), and the Ark Cradle would disappear for real. Yusei then agrees on those terms, but as he prepares to face Z-ONE, Aporia appears. Though badly damaged, Aporia challenges Z-ONE to a duel instead, in order to restore Z-ONE's hope in another solution, having learned from his previous duel with Leo that he has always had hope; he also tells Z-ONE that he has found hope from his fights with Team 5D's, unlike Z-ONE. He also questions Z-ONE about why he erased Antinomy's memories, theorizing that he wanted Team 5D's to evolve in order to change the future. Aporia also reveals that the Black Hole that Antinomy was trapped in was a part of the Ark Cradle, but somewhere in future space, and he asks Z-ONE if he was holding Antinomy hostage for some purpose for the future. Aporia then demands that he returns Antinomy to Yusei, and states that is the final task that Aporia will make Z-ONE accomplish, now that he has hope. However, Z-ONE tells Aporia that the time for despair is near, and then he summons 2 huge mechanical dueling arms, and a giant deck, before turning his huge stone tablets (which were scattered all across the room) into real, gigantic cards, which all file into Z-ONE's deck. Despite Aporia summoning out his Machine Emperors Grannel and Wisel, Z-ONE counters his attacks with trap cards that can be activated from his hand, which sends Grannel and then Wisel back to his deck, while reducing Aporia's life points. Then, Z-ONE activates his trap card, Nonexistence, which allows him to Normal Summon a Level 10 or higher monster without Tributing, but will lower its attack points to 0 in the process, to summon Timelord Metaion. The combo and the use of Metaion's ability reduces Aporia's life points to 500. But Aporia is able to draw a new spell card, Afterglow, which could reverse his desperate situation. Seeing a way he could win with this card in his hand, Aporia summons Sky Core, planning to Special Summon Machine Emperor Skiel Infinity, and then carry out his plan to use Afterglow.
147	13	"A Hope Bound for the Future!"; Transliteration: "Mirai he Tsunagu Kibō!" (Japanese: 未来へつなぐ希望！)	Yoshifumi Fukushima	February 9, 2011	N/A
Aporia summons Machine Emperor Skiel by destroying Sky Core, but then he destroys Skiel using a trap, so that he can draw the spell card "Destroyed Future." Then, Aporia activates its effects, choosing to destroy his own deck, so that he can use his card, After Glow, on his next turn, in an attempt to guarantee a win against Z-ONE, if he is able to draw After Glow during his next Draw Phase. However, during the Standby Phase of his next turn, Timelord Metaion returns to Z-ONE's deck, and he summons another Timelord, Razion, using Nonexistence's effect once more. Razion's effect returns all of Aporia's cards in his Graveyard back to his deck, which was then shuffled. As a result, Aporia is unable to draw the card he needs (After Glow), and is defeated by Razion's effect, which deals him 1,000 points of damage when he draws a card on the draw phase. Before Aporia dies, he gives Yusei's Duel Runner wings, by fusing his duel disk with Yusei's Duel Runner, allowing it to fly. Yusei challenges Z-ONE to a final turbo duel taking place in the skies between New Domino City and Ark Cradle as the collision approaches, which will be broadcast across New Domino City, through the Ark Cradle. The Ark Cradle then glows Rainbow, the walls of the room then turns transparent, which gives the Signers an upside down view of New Domino City, and huge monitors appear around the Ark Cradle, which will be used for the broadcast. The other Signers then decide to give their dragon cards to Yusei to fight Z-ONE with, knowing that he will need all the help that he can get in order to beat Z-ONE. The duel begins with Z-ONE immediately Tribute Summoning Timelord Metaion, using Time Maiden's ability to count as 2 tributes for the summoning of a Fairy-type monster.
148	14	"Just One Chance To Turn It All Around"; Transliteration: "Tada Ichimai ni Kaketa Shōki" (Japanese: ただ1枚に懸けた勝機)	Kenichi Yamashita	February 16, 2011	N/A
Yusei summons both Red Dragon Archfiend and Black-Winged Dragon, while Z-ONE replaces Metaion with Razion, using his trap, Nonexistence. Z-ONE then activates Razion's ability when Yusei draws a card during his Draw Phase, reducing Yusei's life points to 3,000. The attack sends Yusei flying out of control. But before he smashes into the Ark Cradle, Yusei manages to regain control of his duel runner, and flies back to Z-ONE. Yusei then summons Black Rose Dragon, and uses a trap to negate its destruction effect and deal damage to Z-ONE, reducing his life points to 1,500. Z-ONE then spins out of control, and when he smashes into a building of the Ark Cradle, the impact causes the right half of Z-ONE's mask to break, revealing his face to be that of a much older-looking Yusei.
149	15	"The Revived Hero"; Transliteration: "Yomigaetta Eiyū" (Japanese: 蘇った英雄)	Kenichi Yamashita	February 23, 2011	N/A
Z-ONE claims to be Yusei from the future, though Yusei refuses to believe this. Z-ONE sacrifices Nonexistencce to activate Endless Emptiness, a trap that allows him to Special Summon multiple Level 10 or higher monsters from his hand, at the cost of lowering those monster's attack points to 0. It also negates the effect of the Timelords that prevents Z-ONE from summoning monsters. Z-ONE then Special Summons 3 more Timelords through his trap's effect; Timelords Zaphion, Zadion, and Camion. Then, Z-ONE attacks Yusei's Black-Winged Dragon with Timelord Zaphion, in an attempt to utilize its ability, which would shuffle all of Yusei's spell and trap cards on the field back into his deck. However, Yusei counters this, activating Scrap-Iron Scarecrow, saving himself from Zaphion's effect. Z-ONE then attacks with the other 2 Timelords, using Zadion's effect to restore his Life Points to 4,000, and using Camion's effect to return Yusei's monsters to his deck, and to deal him damage, which reduces Yusei's life points to 1,500. Owing to the damage, Yusei's duel runner plummets towards the ground. Before Yusei would crash into New Domino City, Yusei manages to regain control of his duel runner, and flies back to the duel. Z-ONE then taunts Yusei of still having hope in this desperate situation, and says that like Yusei, he himself used to have hope, until his failure taught him that the only way to save the future was to destroy New Domino City. Yusei still denies this, stating that he will still have hope not matter what happens, and tells Z-ONE that Z-ONE is not him. Seeing that Yusei still refuses to believe him, Z-ONE decides to show him his memories. Z-ONE explains that 200 years later, he lived as scientist, who used technology to make himself into a copy of Yusei, in hopes of restoring hope and peace to the people, so that their emotions would stabilize the Ener-D reactor. But after all that he had taught them, the humans went back to own their greedy ways, and the Ener-D reactor then chose to self-destruct. This causes Z-ONE's efforts to be in vain, when all of the Machine Emperors and the Ener-D reactor self-destructed, triggering another larger Zero Reverse and wiping out almost all of humanity, which resulted in Z-ONE being unable to save anyone that he was escorting. This caused Z-ONE to fall into despair, and he lost his hope. Thus, Z-ONE resolved that the only way to save the future was to destroy New Domino City, and the Ener-D reactor along with it, stating, "In order to save someone, I must sacrifice someone". Z-ONE's 3 Timelords then return to his deck. However, Timelord Zaphion's effect activates, which lets Z-ONE draw cards from his deck until he has 5 cards in his hand, allowing Z-ONE to refresh his hand with 4 new Timelords. Despite this advantage, Yusei uses the trap Cards of Reversal to draw an equal amount of cards, and he summons Ancient Fairy Dragon. However, this allows Z-ONE to activate a trap from his hand that allows him to draw 2 more cards. Then, Z-ONE summons five more Timelords, including Timelord Sandaion, which unlike the other 9 Timelords, has 4,000 attack and defense points.
150	16	"Feelings Entrusted of My Father"; Transliteration: "Chichi ga Takushita Omoi" (Japanese: 父が託した想い)	Kenichi Yamashita	March 2, 2011	N/A
Timelord Sandaion's attack points are lowered from 4,000 to 0, due to the effects of Endless Emptiness. Z-ONE attacks Yusei's Ancient Fairy Dragon with Timelord Michion, reducing Yusei's life points to 750, through Michion's ability. As a result of the damage, Yusei plunges downward again, but Yusei is able to navigate his duel runner through the structure of New Domino City, and find his way back to Z-ONE. When Z-ONE attacks with Hairon, and then Raphion, Yusei is able to protect himself from taking damage and losing to their effects, by timing the activation of Scrap-Iron Scarecrow, and his Synchro Believer's ability. When all of Yusei's cards on his field, including Scrap-Iron Scarecrow, are sent back to his deck by Gabrion's ability, Yusei protects himself from Z-ONE's last attack from Sandaion (which would have inflicted an additional 4,000 points of damage after it battles), by activating Synchro Keeper's ability, which brings out Power Tool Dragon and ends the Battle Phase. However, Z-ONE sends Endless Emptiness to the Graveyard to activate Infinite Light, a trap that lets him keep all of his Timelords on the field, and returns Sandaion's attack points from 0 to 4,000. Just then, the Ark Cradle begins to collide with New Domino City's central building as it approaches, and it begins to break apart, with chunks of the Ark Cradle falling off. A piece of the Ark Cradle knocks a card out of Yusei's hand. Yusei manages to retrieve the card, but then Yusei himself is knocked off of his Duel Runner, when a larger fragment of the Ark Cradle collides with his Duel Runner. Seeing this, the Signers and New Domino City's residents become horrified, and grow emotional over him. But before Yusei hits the ground, he is saved by his father, Dr. Fudo, who convinces him to keep fighting, no matter how hard things may seem. Then, Yusei returns to the duel with his missing card, resolving to never give up. Yusei then summons Life Stream Dragon, whose ability restores Yusei's life points from 750 to 2,000. Then, Yusei revives the other Signer dragons using the Speed Spell Synchro Panic, and then he uses the Crimson Dragon's power with the Seal of the Crimson Dragon to achieve an Over Top Clear Mind. Then, Yusei performs a Limit Over Accel Synchro in space, summoning a new monster, Shooting Quasar Dragon.
151	17	"Gathering Wishes"; Transliteration: "Tsudoishi Negai" (Japanese: 集いし願い)	Shin Yoshida	March 9, 2011	N/A
Yusei returns to the sky with Shooting Quasar Dragon, shocking Z-ONE, because a Limit Over Accel Synchro monster had never existed before in the timeline. Yusei uses Shooting Quasar Dragon's effect to attack and destroy all 5 of Z-ONE's Timelords on the field, although Shooting Quasar Dragon is destroyed in the process, when it battles Sandaion. Then, Yusei uses Shooting Quasar Dragon's effect to bring out Shooting Star Dragon and attacks Z-ONE directly, reducing his life points to 700. Z-ONE screams when he takes the damage, and then he crashes into New Domino City's central building. Yusei then removes all of his speed counters to draw Gathering Wishes, and sets it face-down. Yusei tells Z-ONE that he had no right take away people's future, with Z-ONE scoffing at this notion. When Yusei asks why Z-ONE couldn't believe in the possibility that people could save the future themselves, Z-ONE responds by shouting that he doesn't have any time left. Then, Z-ONE angrily blasts a hole in the building, and flies back up into the sky. Z-ONE is enraged at Yusei for reducing his life points by such a great amount, and his rage whips up a temporary windstorm. Then, he tells Yusei that he will now prove to him that hope, and the possibility to fix the future without New Domino City's destruction (which Yusei kept believing in) was pointless. Having already summoned all 10 Timelords during the duel, Z-ONE then uses his trap's effects once more, and sends Infinite Light to the Graveyard to Special Summon his true ace monster, The Ultimate Timelord, Sephylon. Sephylon's first special ability revives 4 of Z-ONE's Timelords, bringing back Metaion, Zadion, Gabrion, and Sandaion, and raising their attack and defense points to 4,000, though their special abilities are negated. Sephylon's next special ability raises its own attack points from 4,000 to 20,000, as that is the total of all of the Timelords' attack points. Although Shooting Star Dragon is destroyed when Z-ONE attacks with Sephylon, Yusei survives the attack, thanks to his trap, Gathering Wishes, and summons Stardust Dragon. Yusei then uses his trap's other effects to raise its attack points by the total attack points of the Synchro Monsters in his Graveyard, giving Stardust Dragon an even stronger power of 23,000 attack points. However, Z-ONE uses Sephiron's ability, allowing him to prevent its destruction once, and an additional number of times each time he removes from play a Timelord that he controls. But Yusei activates the final effect of Gathering Wishes, allowing him to force a battle between Sephylon and Stardust Dragon, each time that he returns a Synchro Monster in his Graveyard to his Extra Deck, even though this will lower Stardust Dragon's attack points in the process. Yusei attacks continuously, destroying Sephylon's shield of Timelords, much to Z-ONE's shock. With the power of his friends and supporters, Yusei destroys Sephylon with Stardust Dragon, defeating Z-ONE, which stops the Ark Cradle's descent (all during Z-ONE's turn). Although the Ark Cradle powered off, it continues to break apart, but this time it happens on a much faster scale. Yusei then talks with Z-ONE, wanting to save him. However, Z-ONE reveals that even if his life support system hadn't failed, he still would have died at this age (over 5,000 years), making Yusei feel helpless. Z-ONE then tells Yusei that it was okay, and he reveals that the reason behind his actions was his belief in Yusei's ability to save the future, a hope that this duel had allowed him to regain. After hearing this, Yusei flies into the Ark Cradle, preparing to sacrifice himself in order to apply the positive energy to the Ark Cradle's Ener-D reactor needed to stop the Ark Cradle's destruction and make it reverse course. But then, Z-ONE reappears, having regained hope, and decides to go in his place. Yusei refuses to let Z-ONE sacrifice himself, but Z-ONE responds that Yusei is the hope of the future, and that he needs to return to his people. Then, Z-ONE throws Yusei out of the Central Gear, and rams himself into the Ener-D generator. Before he dies, Z-ONE wishes to meet Aporia, Paradox, and Antinomy in a changed future. As the Ark Cradle disappears from over New Domino City, Yusei returns safely to his friends.
152	18	"An Advancing Future"; Transliteration: "Susumubeki Mirai" (Japanese: 進むべき未来)	Yasuyuki Suzuki	March 23, 2011	N/A
Six months have passed since Z-ONE's defeat. The Public Safety Maintenance Bureau has dissolved into a city hall, with Lazar becoming the city's mayor. Yusei has become a scientist who supervises the completion of a new Ener-D mainframe, titled Fortune, to ensure the safety of the city, and to link New Domino City to the rest of the world, with New Domino City beginning to lead the world in using Ener-D. Crow had become a highway patroller, getting an invitation from an overseas leagues, Akiza plans to study abroad to become a doctor, and Leo and Luna receive a letter from their parents asking them to leave New Domino City to live with them, leading everyone to wonder about the future of Team 5D's. Yusei also receives an invitation from another dueling league. Jack arrives after training with several other duelists, defeating Greiger, Sherry, and Kalin in the process, having greatly improved his dueling skills. When Jack reveals his desire to leave New Domino City for a World League, to become the World Dueling King, and states that nothing will stop him, even if he has to destroy Team 5D's bonds. As a result, Yusei challenges Jack to a duel, to decide the Signers' futures. Yusei and Jack bring out Stardust Dragon and Red Dragon Archfiend respectively, which Yusei sends 3 turns into the future with a trap card, which drives the meaning behind the duel. Yusei plans for this duel to answer their questions on the future, and to remind Jack of the power of friendship.
153	19	"Clashing Souls!"; Transliteration: "Butsukari au Tamashī!" (Japanese: ぶつかり合う魂！)	Yasuyuki Suzuki	March 30, 2011	N/A
Yusei summons Nitro Warrior, but Jack manages to counter its attack and summon out Exploder Wing Dragon to destroy it, though Yusei manages to beat it with his Turbo Warrior. As the others watch the duel, they recall how Yusei had managed to change their lives. Jack then brings out Crimson Blader, which destroys Turbo Warrior and prevents Yusei from summoning more monsters during his next turn, but Yusei manages to survive Jack's attacks before Stardust Dragon and Red Dragon Archfiend return. Jack then summons out Red Nova Dragon, with a power of 6,000 attack points. Note: In Japan, Episodes 153 and 154 were both aired together, as a 1 hour special.
154	20	"Shining Forth To The Future"; Transliteration: "Hikari Sasu Mirai e" (Japanese: 光り差す未来へ)	Shin Yoshida	March 30, 2011	N/A
Eight years into the future, Luna and Akiza are moving on with their careers while Leo, Jack and Crow continue to make strides in the Turbo Duel circuit. Back in the present, Yusei summons out Shooting Star Dragon and destroys Crimson Blader. Jack then activates the continuous trap card, Scar-Red Cocoon, and equips it to his dragon, which prevents Red Nova Dragon from being destroyed in battle. Later, after surviving a few of Jack's attacks, Yusei uses a trap so that Shooting Star Dragon can destroy Red Nova Dragon, along with itself. Jack then activates Scar-Red Cocoon's second effect; since Red Nova Dragon was destroyed while it was equipped with Scar-Red Cocoon, he can special summon Red Dragon Archfiend during his end phase. With both Red Nova Dragon and Shooting Star Dragon sent to the graveyard, and Red Dragon Archfiend back on the field, Yusei then brings out Junk Warrior, and uses a trap to summon a few low level monsters to the field. Then, he powers up Junk Warrior with the attack points of all his low level monsters, through Junk Warrior's ability, which grants it more than enough attack points to defeat Jack, and destroy Red Dragon Archfiend. Yusei reveals he plans to stay in New Domino City, inspiring the others to seek out their dreams, knowing that their bonds will still be there. Then, Yusei has Junk Warrior attack Red Dragon Archfiend, which allows him to win the duel. Jack then decides that he will return to New Domino City, after he has become the World Dueling Champion, and he also promises that the next time he duels with Yusei, he will not lose. As the others prepare to make their individual journeys, Akiza says her personal goodbyes to Yusei. Before heading off on their journeys, the gang have one last ride together, where the Crimson Dragon appears and removes their Signer marks, as their mission as Signers has been completed. Afterward, Yusei watches them leave. In the extended version (Japanese DVD exclusive), at the end of the ending credits, there is one final snapshot that lets you see the WRGP trophy of Team 5D's with the broken glasses of Bruno (who gave it to Yusei in Episode 145 before his death). The extended ending also shows a picture of Team 5D's victory in Episode 137, with all of the objects mentioned placed on top of a shelf, in Yusei's garage.
