= Yu-Gi-Oh! 5D's season 3 =

Yu-Gi-Oh! 5D's: Road to Destiny
- Season 3
- No. of episodes: 28

Release
- Original network: TV Tokyo
- Original release: July 1, 2009 – January 13, 2010

Season chronology
- ← Previous; Season 2 Next → Season 4

The third season of Yu-Gi-Oh! 5D's (with the title Road to Destiny for the English dub) lasts from episodes 65 to 92. Following the battle with the Dark Signers, the city is reformed and turbo dueling has changed, but a new threat looms, as the 3 Emperors of Yliaster come into play. This season uses two pieces of theme music. The opening theme is "Freedom" by La Vie, while the ending theme is "O-Zone" by Vistlip. Certain episodes also use the insert song "You Say" by La Vie.

The season aired on Toonzai between September 18, 2010, and December 18, 2010, with the exception of Episode 85, which debuted on Hulu on November 27, 2010, and aired on Television (Toonzai) on February 5, 2011. The official Yu-Gi-Oh! YouTube channel counts this season and the remaining dubbed episodes as Season 2.

The movie Yu-Gi-Oh! Bonds Beyond Time also takes place within Season 3, before the events of Crash Town (Episodes 86–92).

== Episode list ==
No. overall	No. in season	Title	Written by	Original release date	American air date
65	1	"A New Threat, Part 1 / A New Threat"; Transliteration: "Aratanaru Kyōi" (Japanese: 新たなる脅威)	Shin Yoshida	July 1, 2009	September 18, 2010
Six months after the battle between the Dark Signers and the Signers, a large stone tablet falls (which is Machine Emperor Wisel Infinity's tablet) from space and lands on Earth, just outside New Domino City. While investigating it, Lazar encounters three people from Yliaster, who are Jakob (the leader), Lester (self-appointed sub-leader), and Primo (the lowest-ranking member). Lazar questions them about their intentions, but after being reminded by Primo that they were his leaders, and a brief outburst in which Primo points the tip of his sword at Lazar's neck, he quickly submits to the trio, and turns over the leadership of New Domino City to them. Then, Primo tells the other members of the trio that he was going to take his Machine Emperor out for a "test drive." A day later, Sector Security investigates a turbo duelist named Ghost, who is attacking Turbo Duelists, and "stealing" their Synchro Monsters, at night. Jack, Yusei and Crow, meanwhile, are preparing for an upcoming tournament, the World Racing Grand Prix (WRGP), but when Trudge suggests Jack, Crow, and Yusei to help him take down the Ghost, Crow rejects Trudge's plea for assistance, in favor of working on their new engine, as he states that they have the Grand Prix to prepare for, and that they don't have any time to spare. Instead, Crow insists that Trudge and the rest of Sector Security, being the cops, go chase after the Ghost themselves. Trudge encounters Ghost later that night, but is defeated and severely injured. He warns Yusei not to use Synchro Monsters against Ghost, as "Synchros are useless." After the incident, Crow feels guilty about what he told Trudge. After Yusei tells him that blaming himself was not going to work, Crow asks Yusei what he should do, to which Yusei replies that they go find and beat the Ghost. Yusei, Jack and Crow then go and search for Ghost, who Yusei soon encounters after several hours of riding. He soon finds himself up against Ghost's ace monster, Machine Emperor Wisel Infinity, a combo monster formed from five other monsters.
66	2	"A New Threat, Part 2 / The Symbol of Evolution - Synchro Monsters"; Transliteration: "Shinka no Akashi Shinkuro Monsutā" (Japanese: 進化の証 シンクロモンスター)	Shin Yoshida	July 8, 2009	September 25, 2010
Yusei summons out his Stardust Dragon and deals some damage to Ghost. However, Ghost uses his Machine Emperor Wisel Infinity's special ability to absorb Stardust Dragon, which causes Stardust Dragon's attack points to be added to Wisel's, boosting its attack points from 2,500 to 5,000. Yusei puts up a good defense, but finds himself pressured. After hanging on for a while, Yusei remembers that he has a second chance, and uses Speed World 2's effect the Crimson Dragon's power to draw another card during his draw phase, which grants him the tuner monster Majestic Dragon, and he is able to retrieve Stardust Dragon using the trap card Syncro particle, and summons the Majestic Star Dragon, and then attacks Wisel Top, resulting in the destruction of the rest of the Machine Emperor, defeating The Ghost. The Ghost then crashes into a forest, and one of the 3 emperors of Yliaster, Primo, retrieves Ghost's duel disk, and his own Wisel deck from The Ghost's duel runner. When Yusei, Jack and Crow arrive at The Ghost's crash site, they discover he is actually a robot that Trudge identifies as a Duel-Bot, that was stolen from Sector Security, and reprogrammed.
67	3	"Lessons Learned / Traditions of the Duel Academy! Ancient Gear Golem"; Transliteration: "Dyueru Akademia no Dentō! Antīku Giagōremu" (Japanese: デュエルアカデミアの伝統！アンティーク・ギアゴーレム)	Koji Ueda	July 15, 2009	September 25, 2010
As Yusei and Crow work on their new engine, they are visited by Leo, Luna and their classmates, including the timid Sly, who is nearly tempted to steal Stardust Dragon. Yusei is asked by the Academy's principal to fix something, which turns out to be the head instructor, Rudolph Heitmann, who is threatening to expel Leo, Luna, and their friends for using low level monsters. Yusei arrives, and challenges Heitmann to a duel, in order to stop them getting expelled, and to prove the strength of low level monsters. Heitmann manages to summon three Ancient Gear Golems on his first turn and deals a lot of damage. Yusei summons out Stardust Dragon, but sacrifices him to summon out several Tuner monsters, which belong to the relevant students. Yusei manages to use them to defeat Heitmann, who learns his lesson, and withdraws the expulsions. As Yusei leaves, Sly contemplates to steal Stardust Dragon. Fortunately, he will never get that chance.
68	4	"Trash Talk / The Memories of the Elderly! The Scrap-Iron Family Deck"; Transliteration: "Rōjin no Kioku Kuzutetsu Famirī Dekki" (Japanese: 老人の記憶！くず鉄ファミリーデッキ)	Tadashi Hayakawa	July 22, 2009	October 2, 2010
Yusei, Jack and Crow pay a visit to Martha and Blister, where Blister talks to them about the asteroid crater. Crow is asked to retrieve an old man named Bashford who refuses to leave his house due to family ties. However, the route to his house is filled with booby traps. He ends up on top of an old-fashioned Dueling Arena (which Bashford had built himself, in hopes that his son Koki would return and duel him), (Dueling Arenas were first used, in the first season of Yu-Gi-Oh! Duel Monsters) and challenges Bashford to a duel. He finds himself under pressure from his Bashford's Scrap-Iron deck, but he manages to make a comeback. The effects of the battle causes the duel arena and the house to collapse, but Crow manages to win the duel and help Bashford. Yusei manages to retrieve a family photo from the house before it collapsed. Bashford thanks them and returns to Martha's place.
69	5	"A Duel With Interest / A Threat! Lone Token Hell"; Transliteration: "Kyōi! Rōn Tōkun Jigoku" (Japanese: 脅威！ローントークン地獄)	Yoshifumi Fukushima	July 29, 2009	October 2, 2010
Families find themselves under pressure from a loan shark named Don Pierro who takes their precious cards. Crow gets angry at Jack for drinking expensive coffee and suggests that he gets a job. However, his ego gets him kicked out of several jobs. He and Carly follow a boy named Marco to a shrine, where he leaves his cards that were deemed unworthy by Pierro. Jack decides to challenge Pierro for everyone's contracts, putting his Red Dragon Archfiend and Duel Runner on the line. Pierro puts pressure on Jack by implementing his Loan Tokens, damaging his life points. However, Jack manages to win using Marco's cards and destroys all of Pierro's loan contracts. However, he still can't get a job.
70	6	"The Wicked Spirit / The Forest that Spirits Away - Sleepy Beauty"; Transliteration: "Kamikakushi no Mori Surīpī Byūtī" (Japanese: 神隠しの森 スリーピービューティ)	Koji Ueda	August 5, 2009	October 9, 2010
While Leo, Luna and Dexter go wandering through a forest, Luna senses an atmosphere, drifts out of consciousness and follows it, despite warning from Kuribon and Regulus. When she awakens, Luna encounters a boy named Hayley who is looking after a doll representing his sister, Claire. When they notice she has gone missing, Dexter goes to Yusei for help, while Leo chases after her. When Leo approaches the house, Hayley feels threatened and goes to duel him. Leo notices the damage Hayley is dealing is similar to a Psychic Duelist's, and summons out his Power Tool Dragon. Yusei arrives and busts into the house and finds a load of people trapped inside cards. Meanwhile, Luna is able to talk with the spirit of Claire. Hayley summons out Hollow Ghost and deals some harsh damage to Leo, but Leo manages to turn it around and win the duel. It is revealed that Hayley had died along with his sister, but didn't realize it, which was what kept him there. Hayley reunites with Claire and they both disappear, along with the house, freeing all the trapped people.
71	7	"French Twist, Part 1 / Yusei Captured"; Transliteration: "Torawareta Yusei" (Japanese: 捕われた遊星)	Yasuyuki Suzuki	August 12, 2009	October 9, 2010
Yusei wakes up to find himself being carried away inside a truck after being ambushed by someone named Ichiro wanting to recruit him for the Grand Prix. When Jack, Crow, Akiza and Mina hear about his capture, they go to look for him. Akiza manages to locate the truck Yusei is captured in, and is surprised to find no one is driving it. Akiza uses her powers to break it open, but ends up trapped in there with Yusei when the truck speeds up. They escape, but are then challenged to a Turbo Duel by a mysterious rider. She brings out a fusion monster while Yusei responds by summoning Junk Warrior, and Akiza finds herself moved from witnessing a Turbo Duel first hand. The rider then brings out her ace monster and reveals herself to be a woman named Sherry Le Blanc, hoping to recruit Yusei to her team.
72	8	"French Twist, Part 2 / What Lies Within the Wind"; Transliteration: "Kaze no Naka ni Arumono" (Japanese: 風の中にあるもの)	Yasuyuki Suzuki	August 19, 2009	October 16, 2010
The duel between Yusei and Sherry continues, with Akiza insisting that she stay and spectate. Yusei brings out Turbo Warrior and deals some damage, and eventually destroys her monster. However, it leaves him in a point where Sherry can win if she draws a Speed Spell, using Speed World 2's effects. Sherry then tells Yusei that she's entering the WRGP to avenge her parents who were killed by Yliaster. Just as Yusei is about to summon Stardust Dragon, Ichiro appears and tries to drop a truck on them. Akiza uses her powers to materialize Stardust Dragon and stop the truck, and Sherry's guardian, Elsworth, beats up Ichiro and his gang. Due to damage to the Duel Lanes, the duel is called off, but they promise to duel again. Akiza is left with a newfound respect for Turbo Duels.
73	9	"Synchro Straits / After Sealing Synchro Summoning..."; Transliteration: "Shinkuro Shōkan wo Fūjita Saki ni..." (Japanese: シンクロ召喚を封じた先に…)	Yoshifumi Fukushima	August 26, 2009	October 16, 2010
Yusei has a nightmare about Stardust Dragon being captured by The Ghost, and of Sherry's offer. Wanting to learn to duel without relying on Synchro monsters, Yusei asks Jack to duel him. As they duel, they are being watched by a mysterious character (who is really Vizor). Sensing fear in Yusei after being attacked by Red Dragon Archfiend, Jack cancels the duel, saying that there's no way to win without Synchros (Vizor left by the time the duel was over). Later, everyone attends a premiere event for the WRGP, where the details for the tournament are shown. Lazar meets up with the group from Yliaster, who are using the tournament for their own gain. Just then, the party is crashed by a violent Turbo Duelist named Dobocle. Akiza stops him from wrecking the party, and the Yliaster trio become interested in her powers. Dobocle tries to escape, but is attacked by another Ghost, who is really Primo, because he got sick of Dobocle's actions. As the gang goes to help, they are stopped by a mysterious character, called Vizor, who says that Yusei is not ready to face the Ghost again.
74	10	"Synchro Solution / Further Evolution! Accel Synchro"; Transliteration: "Saranaru Shinka! Akuseru Shinkuro" (Japanese: さらなる進化！アクセルシンクロ)	Yoshifumi Fukushima	September 2, 2009	October 23, 2010
The mysterious dueler, known only as Vizor, decides to train Yusei to face Ghost. He starts off by racing him, testing Yusei's ability to handle mach speeds. Once he cleared that, the duel begins, with Vizor managing to summon two Synchro Monsters in his first turn. Before Yusei is able to counterattack, Vizor speeds up to mach-speed, performing an Accel Synchro with his two monsters to form a new one. Yusei responds by summoning Drill Warrior, and powers it up later, though Vizor decides to take direct damage and lose the duel, instead of damaging his monster. The Yliaster, who had been watching the duel, become curious about Vizor's actions.
75	11	"Acceleration / Aki Izayoi Acceleration!"; Transliteration: "Izayoi Aki Akuserarēshon!" (Japanese: 十六夜アキ アクセラレーション！)	Tadashi Hayakawa	September 9, 2009	October 23, 2010
Wanting to understand what Turbo Duelists feel, Akiza decides to apply for a Turbo Duel License. Despite initially making many mistakes, her determination, along with Yusei's tutelage, allows her to pass the initial exams. Yusei also takes her rollerskating to help her learn how to ride backwards. Yusei then builds her a proper Duel Runner, with the help of Jack and Crow. To obtain her license, she has to beat Trudge in a qualification duel, though she initially has trouble getting to grip with Speed Spells, and her Black Rose Dragon gets beaten. However, she manages to turn it around and summon her Splendid Rose. Some guys, who were furious about losing to Akiza in the initial exams, activate a trap to trip Akiza up. However, using the skills Yusei taught her, she evades the trap and defeats Trudge. With her license earned, Yusei welcomes Akiza to the world of Turbo Dueling. Meanwhile Jack beats up the guys that activated the trap and calls Akiza his friend.
76	12	"Syd Is Vicious / Proud Demon Chaos King"; Transliteration: "Hokoritakaki Dēmon Kaosu Kingu" (Japanese: 誇り高き デーモン・カオス・キング)	Koji Ueda	September 16, 2009	October 30, 2010
Jack and Carly investigate some Duel Runner thefts. While chasing after a group of them, one of the members, who is actually an undercover agent named Kaz, gets injured. Jack feels responsible for causing the accident, and tries to investigate the matter himself, but is ganged up on and knocked out. He doesn't give up, and soon comes across the entire gang again, where he is once again beaten. However, he was able to place a tracker on one of the members, and finds their hideout, which is located on a large ship. The boss, Syd, challenges Jack to a duel in which the loser is thrown into a crusher. Syd gets the upper hand early on, and despite Jack summoning several monsters, he still finds himself countered. It is soon revealed that their hideout is on a tanker, which has sailed out of range from Sector Security. Syd summons his Synchro Monster, but Jack responds by Synchro Summoning a monster he borrowed from Kaz to win the duel, and manages to act in time before Syd is crushed, but beats up Syd and his gang, who are later arrested by Sector Security. Jack returns Kaz's card and promises to Turbo Duel him when he recovers.
77	13	"Dawn of the Duel Board, Part 1 / He Enters! The Super Elite Transfer Student"; Transliteration: "Tōjō! Sūpā Erīto Tenkōsei" (Japanese: 登場！スーパーエリート転校生)	Yoshifumi Fukushima	September 23, 2009	October 30, 2010
As Yusei and Akiza have a practice Turbo Duel, Leo ponders how he'd fare as a Turbo Duelist. Meanwhile, the Yliaster trio discuss their plans involving the Crimson Dragon, and another tablet crashes into the earth. Later at Duel Academy, a boy named Lester (one of the Yliaster emperors in disguise) enrolls into the school hoping to find out more about Luna, who soon falls in love with Lester. Leo gets annoyed with him asking her so many questions, so Lester uses an illusion to separate him from Luna, and takes her to his mansion. When Leo realizes he's been tricked, he sneaks into the mansion, where Lester shows off an Ener-D powered skateboard that can be used for Turbo Dueling, called a Duel Board, which he gives to Luna. Feeling jealous, Leo begs Yusei to build him his own Duel Board, and spends several days practicing. Luna later joins him in practicing, but they are attacked by another Duel Skater (who is really Lester back in his original dueling outfit) who traps her in a duel. Leo decides to help her, making it a 2 vs 1 duel. They soon realize that the damage is real, and the duelist brings out Machine Emperor Skiel Infinity.
78	14	"Dawn of the Duel Board, Part 2 / A Nightmare Reborn! Machine Emperor Skiel Infinity"; Transliteration: "Yomigaeru Akumu! Kikōtei Sukieru" (Japanese: 甦る悪夢！機皇帝スキエル∞)	Yoshifumi Fukushima	September 30, 2009	November 6, 2010
Realizing Luna and Leo are in trouble, Yusei, Jack, Crow, and Akiza head off to find them. Luna summons out Ancient Fairy Dragon, but it is soon absorbed by Machine Emperor Skiel Infinity. As Yusei and company can only watch, Leo recognizes his opponent as Lester, but Lester states the recognition of his identity has already come to late for them to do anything about it. Luna soon takes some damage in order to protect Leo from Skiel's attacks. Leo summons out Power Tool Dragon, and using traps and monster effects, manages to retrieve Ancient Fairy Dragon. Lester upgrades Skiel and defeats Leo, knocking him off the bridge, but the Crimson Dragon appears and saves him. Luna's counterattack fails, but her Duel Monster spirits prevent her from being hurt, after she loses. When the group try to investigate Lester, they find his mansion gone, and that no one at Duel Academy remembers him. Spurred on by this attack, Yusei becomes determined to learn the Accel Synchro.
79	15	"Putting It All Together / To a World Yet Unseen"; Transliteration: "Madaminu Sekai e" (Japanese: まだ見ぬ世界へ)	Shin Yoshida	October 7, 2009	November 6, 2010
Recap episode. As Yusei tests out his engine, Jack and Crow look back on his previous battles to try to understand him. When they meet up with Yusei, he suspects that Yliaster is the one behind Ghost and is planning something big with the WRGP. He also tells Jack and Crow about Accel Synchro. They become determined to learn this new move, which would require a new engine. Meanwhile, a mysterious person washes up on the beach.
80	16	"The Super Genius / The Mysterious Super Mechanic"; Transliteration: "Nazo no Sūpā Mekanikku" (Japanese: 謎のスーパーメカニック)	Shin Yoshida	October 14, 2009	November 13, 2010
Trudge and Mina invite Yusei, Jack and Crow for a fancy dinner, albeit with a motive. They want them to look after Bruno, an amnesiac who recently washed up onto New Domino City. While they initially refuse, they soon discover he is an extremely talented mechanic. Yusei becomes particularly interested in him, as he could help build the engine he needs to perfect Accel Synchro. However, as he spends more time with him, his friends start to get a bit jealous. Yusei and Bruno manage to complete the program needed for his new engine, but it is stolen overnight. Finding a fingerprint on a cup ramen packet, they decide to hack into the Security network to find the culprit, having to complete a puzzle duel in order to gain access. Jack and Crow have trouble going up against Mirror Force, but Bruno uses his intuition to figure out the correct solution. They discover that the matching fingerprint belongs to Lazar.
81	17	"Get With the Program, Part 1 / Operation Capture Jaeger"; Transliteration: "Iēgā Hokaku Sakusen" (Japanese: イェーガー捕獲作戦!)	Kenichi Yamashita	October 21, 2009	November 13, 2010
Yusei, Jack, Crow and Bruno decide to trail Lazar, who had stolen their program for Primo. Noticing he is being followed, Lazar heads to the mall where Yusei and company manage to apprehend him, but he makes a break for it. Lazar manages to lose Jack and Crow using holograms, though Bruno manages to figure out, and he and Yusei follow Lazar to a complex. Lazar gives the program to Primo, who then notices they are being followed and sets off the alarm, separating Yusei and Bruno. Primo activates a dueling Guard Robot filled with Yusei's battle data in order to stall Yusei while he installs the program into hundreds of Duel-Bots, collectively called the Diablo. Bruno almost stumbles upon this secret army, but he is knocked out by Primo and thrown out of the secret factory, when he ends up triggering one of his lost memories. Meanwhile the Guard Robot uses its high prediction capabilities to block off Yusei's high level monsters and special summons, putting him in a tough spot.
82	18	"Get With the Program, Part 2 / Yusei Fudo, 100% Chance of Defeat!"; Transliteration: "Fudō Yūsei Haiboku Kakuritsu Wan Handoreddo Pāsento!" (Japanese: 不動遊星 敗北確率100%！)	Shin Yoshida	October 28, 2009	November 20, 2010
Jack and Crow arrive at the complex only to find themselves locked out, so they sneak in via a ventilation shaft. As Yusei continues to struggle against the Guard Robot, Primo completes their program's installation into the Ghosts, although one of the other emperors of Yliaster, Jakob (the leader), is curious and suspicious of his actions. With his objective complete, Primo starts a self-destruct countdown and leaves using his power, giving Yusei just 10 minutes to win his duel and escape. Jack and Crow join up with Bruno who, reluctantly, have to escape ahead of Yusei. As time is about to run out, Yusei manages to use his monster's abilities to block off the Guard Robot's Lock Deck and summon Stardust Dragon to win the duel. As the complex explodes, Lazar uses his tricks to save Yusei and warns him not to delve any further into the matter.
83	19	"Will the Real Jack Atlas, Please Stand Up, Part 1 / Imposter!? Jack Atlas"; Transliteration: "Yōgisha!? Jakku Atorasu" (Japanese: 容疑者！？ジャック・アトラス)	Koji Ueda	November 4, 2009	November 20, 2010
Sector Security bursts in with a warrant for Jack's arrest. Mina and Trudge show footage of something similar to Jack's Duel Runner causing other people to crash in duels using Red Dragon Archfiend. Yusei and company recall that earlier, Jack had fallen out with them over sticking to his usual plays. Jack still denies committing any crimes, and Crow doesn't help. As a result, Jack is arrested and sent to jail. When news spreads, everyone else has a hard time believing it. Later that night, an electronic bug breaks open Jack's cell, allowing him to escape. However, he then runs into an identical Jack Atlas riding an identical Duel Runner and behaving like Jack in his "Duel King" phase (from Season 1), and is challenged to a Turbo Duel. Jack draws a Tuner Monster that can summon Red Dragon Archfiend, but refuses to use it due to the earlier argument, and summons Exploder Dragon instead. He initially gains the upper hand, but is shocked to find his tactics dubbed weak by the impostor. The impostor summons an identical Red Dragon Archfiend and defeats Jack, knocking him into the sea. Yusei and Crow arrive only to see the impostor, thinking that the real Jack Atlas has committed yet another crime.
84	20	"Will the Real Jack Atlas, Please Stand Up, Part 2 / Another Jack"; Transliteration: "Mō Hitori no Jakku" (Japanese: もう一人のジャック)	Koji Ueda	November 11, 2009	November 27, 2010
Wanting to find out the truth behind Jack's alleged crime spree, Carly meets with a pair of hippies who caught a picture of two of Jack's Duel Runner. She replays this to Yusei and Crow, who search the crash site only to find one of Jack's cards. The real Jack is trapped in a virtual prison of sorts, made by the Yliaster trio, forced to watch his impostor ruin his reputation. Yusei and Crow catch up with the impostor, but are attacked by his thrusters. Hearing his friends kindness, Jack breaks free from his imprisonment, and catches up with his impostor for a rematch. This time Jack learns from his mistakes and uses the right Tuner Monster to summon Red Dragon Archfiend. The impostor then summons his own Red Dragon Archfiend but Jack manages to destroy it. However, the imposter then manages to revive it, and summons two more Red Dragon Archfiend copies. Jack manages to survive his attack and is granted the power to summon Majestic Red Dragon by his Mark of the Dragon. With its power, Jack manages to destroy the three dragons, along with the impostor, who was actually a Ghost duel robot. Back in the Yliaster trio's hideout, Primo complains that the duel was worthless, until a line lights up on a dashboard, signifying the activation of a circuit on the Infinity Circuit, resulting in Jakob being pleased, as he states that everything is going according to their plan. Jack returns to where he was held captive, only to find it gone. Yusei then has an uneasy feeling that they're being used by Yliaster's plan.
85	21	"Mother Knows Best / The Grandfather Clock, Poppo Time"; Transliteration: "Poppo Taimu no Furudokei" (Japanese: ポッポタイムの古時計)	Tadashi Hayakawa	November 18, 2009	November 27, 2010 (Hulu); February 5, 2011 (TV)
Yusei's landlord, Zora, is depressed because the city wants to replace the broken cuckoo clock on her clock repair shop. Later, the gang are visited by Zora's son, Lynden, who has returned after three years of training to fix the clock. When he goes to see Zora again, she is not happy to see him, since he was the one who broke the clock in the first place. Before he can run off, Crow challenges him to a duel, forcing him to apologize if he won. Crow runs into a bit of trouble with Lynden absorbing one of his monsters and summoning out his Clock Knight monsters that rely on coin tosses, but soon comes back with his Blackwing Armor Master. Lynden tries to back off from the duel, but Crow tells him he needs to stop running away from his problems. Lynden summons a Time Wizard he got from his late father to destroy Crow's monster. Crow decides to take the damage instead of activating his Mirror Force, since Lynden had realized he can't keep running away regardless of his victory. Lynden successfully fixes the cuckoo clock and rekindles his relationship with Zora.
86	22	"Duelist for Hire / Crash Town"; Transliteration: "Kurasshu Taun" (Japanese: クラッシュタウン)	Yasuyuki Suzuki	November 25, 2009	November 27, 2010
Yusei arrives in a desert town called Crash Town, after receiving a letter from a woman named Barbara that Kalin was in trouble. She explains that in this town, there are battles at sunset between the Malcolm family and the Radley group. Yusei is surprised to find Kalin siding with Radley's group, and notices a change in his personality. Kalin uses his Handless Combo and quickly defeats Malcolm's challenger, who is taken away to become a slave in the mountains. Yusei tries to reach Kalin, but he doesn't answer him. Barbara tells Yusei the only way to save him is to beat him in a duel to separate him from the Radley family. Yusei decides to join up with the Malcolm family, earning his place by defeating three of Malcolm's men in one turn, with his Nitro Warrior. (Please Note That The US Air date was November 27, but the previous episode online appeared on Hulu, on the same day)
87	23	"Showdown at Sundown, Part 1 / Rescue Kiryu! The Town of Wandering Duelists"; Transliteration: "Kiryū Kyūshutsu! Samayoeru Dyuerisuto no Machi" (Japanese: 鬼柳救出！さまよえる決闘者の街)	Yasuyuki Suzuki	December 2, 2009	December 4, 2010
Kalin still has memories of when he was a Dark Signer, and doesn't even find encouragement from the words of a young boy. Barbara mentions a plan involving using dynamite to aid Kalin's escape following their duel. During the next sunset, Yusei duels Kalin, who quickly puts his Handless Combo into effect. Kalin laments that he was never able to forgive himself for the actions he took as a Dark Signer, and has been looking to die, saying he'll be satisfied if Yusei defeats him. Yusei manages to take the lead, but Kalin still has tricks up his sleeve.
88	24	"Showdown at Sundown, Part 2 / The Trap Laid in Front of Victory"; Transliteration: "Kiryū Kyūshutsu! Samayoeru Dyuerisuto no Machi" (Japanese: 勝利の先にある罠)	Yasuyuki Suzuki	December 9, 2009	December 4, 2010
Kalin summons Infernity Doom Dragon, while Yusei summons Stardust Dragon. Using an equip monster, Yusei manages to defeat Kalin. However, Barbara betrays Yusei, attacking him while Kalin is taken away. The Malcolm family's top dog, Lawton, then appears and duels Radley, beating him before he even gets a turn. Barbara and the Malcolm family had used Yusei all along to remove Kalin from the Radley group so they would be easy prey. Yusei, along with Kalin and Radley, are taken to the mines and given shock collars. Yusei finds a means of escaping, but Kalin still refuses to be helped. Meanwhile, Nico and West sneak off with Yusei's Duel Runner.
89	25	"The Race to Escape, Part 1 / Terror of Gatling Ogre"; Transliteration: "Gatoringu Ōga no Kyōfu" (Japanese: ガトリング・オーガの恐怖)	Yasuyuki Suzuki	December 16, 2009	December 11, 2010
Yusei knocks out Kalin, so they can escape, stumbling upon a graveyard of lost duelists. They then encounter Nico and West who have Yusei's Duel Runner, and learn that their father is still inside the mines. Lawton then finds them, so while Kalin and the kids look for their father, Yusei distracts him with a Turbo Duel. Lawton immediately summons Gatling Ogre, but Yusei's manages to delay its One Turn Kill ability. However, Lawton soon replaces it with Full Armor Ogre. Meanwhile, Kalin and the kids escape on a mine cart and arrive in a different mine. They become surrounded, but Kalin fights them off as West and Nico find their father, setting off to escape again. Yusei manages to beat Full Armor Ogre, but Lawton manages to resummon Gatling Ogre, putting Yusei in a position where one card could mean his defeat.
90	26	"The Race to Escape, Part 2 / Death Match Riding Duel"; Transliteration: "Shitō no Raidingu Dyueru" (Japanese: 死闘のライディングデュエル)	Yasuyuki Suzuki	December 23, 2009	December 11, 2010
As Kalin escapes with the kids and their father, Sergio, the pursuers start activating the father's shock collar, but Kalin manages to stop it though nearly falls off the kart in the process. Yusei manages to avoid losing to effects, but Lawton instead summons a more powerful monster. Kalin's group are directed towards a deadly gap, so West and Nico's father jumps to change the tracks to safety, and Sergio falls into the abyss in the process (and dies) in the english dubbed version he is just badly hurt. Yusei manages to summon Drill Warrior from his graveyard, and Kalin knocks into Lawton before he can respond to it. Lawton then throws some dynamite which sends everyone flying, with Yusei and Kalin falling into a canyon. Lawton kidnaps Nico and West, and along with Barbara overthrows Malcolm. As Yusei and Kalin visit the father's (Sergio) grave, his duel disk reacts to Kalin, who decides to fight with Yusei.
91	27	"Clash at Crash Town, Part 1 / Tag Duel: Kiryu & Yusei VS Lawton"; Transliteration: "Taggu Dyueru Kiryu to Yusei Bāsasu Rotten" (Japanese: タッグデュエル 鬼柳・遊星 VS ロットン)	Yasuyuki Suzuki	January 6, 2010	December 18, 2010
Barbara starts forcing members of the Malcolm family to duel each other to provide new workers for the mines. Yusei and Kalin arrive and challenge Lawton to a duel for Nico and West's freedom and to liberate the town. Lawton gets a handicap to start with 10 cards, giving him easy access to Gatling Ogre's ability. Kalin stops Yusei from negating Galting Ogre's effect and gets attacked. However, he has a special monster, Infernity Zero, whose ability allows him to remain in the duel even with 0 life points, though he will lose if he gains 3 Doom Counters. Lawton manages to destroy the card Yusei used to negate Gatling Ogre's effect in their last duel, but both he and Kalin manage to defend against Lawton's attacks, and Kalin manages to bring up his defense.
92	28	"Clash at Crash Town, Part 2 / Satisfaction Town"; Transliteration: "Satisufakushon" (Japanese: サティスファクションウン)	Yasuyuki Suzuki	January 13, 2010	December 18, 2010
Yusei summons his Nitro Warrior and beats Gatling Ogre, dealing some damage to Lawton. However, Lawton summons out Long Barrel Ogre, and Kalin gains another Doom Counter, but Yusei sacrifices his Nitro Warrior to keep Kalin in the game. Kalin and Yusei both summon out their Infernity Doom Dragon, and Stardust Dragon, but their attacks don't get through. Barbara threatens to harm Nico and West if Yusei and Kalin don't surrender, but the Malcolm family stand up against her. Lawton tries shooting his Shock Gun at Kalin, but is stopped by the arrival of Crow and Jack, who had brought along Sector Security to free all of the miners. Lawton sets off some explosions to escape, but Kalin catches up to him to finish the duel. Lawton makes an assumption about Kalin's cards, but he is defeated, thanks to the effects of Kalin's monsters. Lawton and Barbara are arrested by Sector Security, Crash Town is rebuilt as Satisfaction Town, and Kalin stays behind to look after Nico and West.
