= Yu-Gi-Oh! Zexal season 1 =

Yu-Gi-Oh! Zexal
- Season 1
- No. of episodes: 25

Release
- Original network: TV Tokyo
- Original release: April 11 – October 3, 2011

Season chronology
- ← Previous; Yu-Gi-Oh! 5D's; Season 4 Next → Season 2

Yu-Gi-Oh! Zexal season 1 consists of episodes 1–25 of Yu-Gi-Oh! Zexal. It aired on TV Tokyo from April 11 to October 3 of 2011.

The opening theme is "Masterpiece" (マスターピース Masutāpīsu?) by mihimaru GT while the ending theme is "My Quest" (僕クエスト Boku Kuesuto?) by Golden Bomber. For the 4Kids and Konami English dub versions, the opening theme is "Take a Chance".

== Episode list ==
No. overall	No. in season	English dub title / Japanese translated title	Written by	Original release date	American air date
1	1	"Go With the Flow: Part 1" / "I'm Feeling the Flow!"; Transliteration: "Kattobingu da ze, Ore!!" (Japanese: かっとビングだぜ、オレ!!)	Shin Yoshida	April 11, 2011	October 15, 2011
Yuma Tsukumo is an ambitious student who is underachieving in both school and in duels, but can never turn down a challenge. One day, he and his friend Tori Meadows spot their other friend, Bronk Stone, get beaten in a duel against Reginald "Shark" Kastle, the school bully, who takes his deck as a result. When Yuma stands up to him, Shark breaks the key he got from his father and kicks half of it away, though he gives him a chance to put his own deck on the line in a duel to win back Bronk's deck. Noticing Yuma looking less ambitious but still willing to fight against Shark, Bronk manages to return the second half of his key to him. The day of the duel between Yuma and Shark comes, and Yuma's amateur duel skills put him at a disadvantage against Shark's deck. As Yuma defends himself against Shark's assault, his key suddenly repairs itself and he finds himself in front of a strange door, which he opens with his key. A mysterious being emerges and tries to merge with Yuma, but this fails and the memories and power of the spirit are divided into 100 Number cards, which then fly off in different directions. Upon returning to the real world, Shark is possessed by a Number card and summons the Xyz monster Number 17: Leviathan Dragon, while Yuma is greeted by the mysterious spirit.
2	2	"Go With the Flow: Part 2" / "My Name is Astral"; Transliteration: "Waga na wa Asutoraru" (Japanese: わが名はアストラル!)	Shin Yoshida	April 18, 2011	October 22, 2011
The being, known as Astral, speaks to Yuma, who is the only one who can see or hear him, explaining he is a duelist whose memories have been divided into 100 Number cards. Yuma manages to inflict some damage to Shark, but it is then revealed that Number monsters can only be destroyed by battle with another Number monster. Realizing he will disappear if Yuma loses the duel, Astral starts sharing his duel tactics with him, and gives him an Xyz Monster, Number 39: Utopia, which Yuma summons to deal some damage to Shark. Although Shark manages to bring Yuma's life points down to 100, Yuma's determination not to give up allows him to draw a Spell card that allows him to double Utopia's attack points and destroy Leviathan Dragon, winning the duel. After the duel, Astral claims the Number card that possessed Shark, even while his gang deserts him. Then, Shark apologizes and returns Bronk's deck. After that, Astral said that they could be friends – if Yuma does as he says! Yuma gets agitated by that remark.
3	3	"In the End: Part 1" / "To Summarize, It's a Case!"; Transliteration: "Todo no Tsumari Jiken desu!" (Japanese: トドのつまり事件です!)	Shin Yoshida	April 25, 2011	October 29, 2011
A computer virus is spread throughout the city, causing systems to go haywire. Meanwhile, Astral gets trapped in a world inside Yuma's key, where he discovers a large space ship that holds all their number cards that they collected together. Yuma later discovers he no longer has his Number card and thus loses to the class president, Caswell Francis, in a duel. Later that day, Yuma's sister, Kari, deduces that the origin of the virus came from somewhere in Yuma's school and asks Yuma and Tori to go on a stakeout. They find Caswell, who inadvertently sets off a virus, and with his help they discover the culprit is their teacher, Mr. Kay, who has been possessed by one of the Numbers. With a virus bomb which will spread throughout the network in 30 minutes, Astral reappears and tells Yuma to battle Kay in a duel. Kay soon summons his Number monster, Number 34: Terror-byte, using its ability to take control of one of Yuma's monsters.
4	4	"In the End: Part 2" / "Countdown to a Comeback! Astral is the Secret Plan!?"; Transliteration: "Gyakuten no Kauntodaun! Hisaku wa Asutoraru!?" (Japanese: 逆転のカウントダウン! 秘策はアストラル!?)	Shin Yoshida	May 2, 2011	November 5, 2011
Yuma's reluctance to listen to Astral's advice drives him further into a corner against Mr. Kay's Terror-byte combo. With his life on the line, Astral starts using reverse psychology to get Yuma to play the cards he needs. Yuma summons out Number 39: Utopia, though Kay summons out Super Crashbug, which switches monster's ATK and DEF points. After a while, though, Yuma figures out that Astral had been tricking him, but decides to listen to him. Yuma then summons out Number 17: Leviathan Dragon, and follows Astral's advice to destroy Super Crashbug, returning all of the monster's ATK and DEF points to normal, and allowing Yuma to defeat Kay, and gain Number 34: Terror-byte and a piece of Astral's memory. The timer counts down to zero, but instead of a virus, it switches on the lights in a building, allowing a large Flashbrite and some fireworks to be displayed in the sky with a Duel Gazer.
5	5	"Flipping Out: Part 1" / "The Duel's Flip Side!"; Transliteration: "Dueru no Ura wo Yomu Ura!" (Japanese: デュエルのウラを読むウラ!)	Yoshifumi Fukushima	May 9, 2011	November 12, 2011
A strange kid named Flip Turner constantly tries to offer Yuma a card named Baby Tiragon, though his friends try to keep him from taking it. Meanwhile, Astral continues to explore Yuma's key, finding a machine that he could activate. Flip eventually manages to get the card to Yuma under the guise of a fan letter. The next day, Yuma is accused of causing several pranks and is shunned by his classmates. Afterward, Flip challenges Yuma to a duel, where he tricks Yuma into summoning Baby Tiragon so he can take control of Utopia.
6	6	"Flipping Out: Part 2" / "Traitorous Numbers!?"; Transliteration: "Uragiri no Nanbāzu!?" (Japanese: 裏切りのナンバーズ!?)	Yoshifumi Fukushima	May 16, 2011	November 19, 2011
Due to possessing Utopia, Flip is possessed by the Number and Astral is weakened. Yuma manages to summon out Leviathan Dragon, but Flip takes control of it as well, putting Astral in a cocoon-like state. Meanwhile, Tori and Bronk investigate the cause of the forged photographs, learning that Flip was the one behind them. As Flip explains his bullied childhood led him to play dirty, Astral tells Yuma to protect Baby Tiragon at all costs. Yuma says that all the respect Flip earned was all fake, and he should have listened to Bronk and Tori. After being pushed into a corner, Yuma manages to use Baby Tiragon's effect with one of his other monsters to send Flip's traps back to his hand, allowing him to regain control of his Numbers, restore Astral and win the duel. Afterwards, Yuma tries to return Baby Tiragon to Flip; however, Flip decides to let him keep it as proof of their new-found friendship. Also, Yuma said that Flip's glasses were "hip," causing him to burst into tears of joy, saying that it was the nicest thing anyone has ever said to him.
7	7	"The Sparrow: Part 1" / "Lavish Justice! The Sparrow Arrives!!"; Transliteration: "Seigi no Ōbanfurumai! Esupā Robin Sanjou!!" (Japanese: 正義の大盤振る舞い! エスパー・ロビン参上!!)	Shin Yoshida	May 23, 2011	November 26, 2011
Astral becomes interested in a television show called "The Sparrow," due to it being about a person from another world, like Astral. After Yuma and his friends attempt to sneak a peak at a rehearsal by Sparrow's actor, Nelson Andrews, he notices Yuma is a duelist and brings him to his dressing room, where it is revealed that he is actually easily frightened off-screen. Nelson asks Yuma to become his friend and duel him, but he is sent away by his mother, who wants him to maintain his image. Yuma finally tells Astral that the show was fictional. Later that night, Nelson finds a Number card and is possessed by it, going around town dressed as The Sparrow and attacking people for doing harmless things (littering, etc.). Yuma confronts Nelson, who truly believes himself to be The Sparrow, and challenges him to a duel. Nelson Advance Summons his key card, Esper Star Sparrow, and brings out his Number card, Number 83: Galaxy Queen, which gives his monsters the ability to inflict piercing damage.
8	8	"The Sparrow: Part 2" / "The Sparrow is Forever"; Transliteration: "Sutā Robin yo Eien ni" (Japanese: スター・ロビンよ永遠に)	Shin Yoshida	May 30, 2011	December 3, 2011
Yuma asks Tori to try to get in contact with Nelson's mom before bringing out Utopia, though Nelson manages to reinforce his side further. As Yuma follows Astral's advice to stay in the game, Nelson's mother comes. She asked what was going on, and Yuma said that she put so much pressure on him that he started thinking he was the Sparrow. She tries to get through to Nelson, who brings out his ultimate monsters, D.D. Jet Iron, with an attack power of 8000. However, Yuma manages to use his traps to stop Jet Iron's attack and cease Galaxy Queen's protection. As Yuma targets Galaxy Queen for the win, Nelson has one of his other monsters take the hit instead. After Astral regains Galaxy Queen and another piece of his memory, Nelson's mother apologizes to Nelson, saying that she did wanted him to be him.
9	9	"Feline Frenzy" / "Cathy's Surprising Cat Deck!?"; Transliteration: "Kyatto Odoroku Neko Dekki!?" (Japanese: キャットオドロく猫デッキ!?)	Yasuyuki Suzuki	June 6, 2011	February 4, 2012
As Yuma just begins to realize that he has been coming to school in bizarre outfits for a week, he learns from Astral that a cat-like thief has been sneaking into his room at night. The next day, Yuma gets word that Tori has allegedly been kidnapped and goes to a mansion where he meets Cathy "Cat" Katherine, a cat lover, who challenges him to the duel. As he fights against her, Cat admits she often feels ignored in class and tries to confess some feelings to Yuma, but he is too focused on the duel, which he wins. He later learns that Tori hadn't been kidnapped after all, but was just playing with her cats.
10	10	"Shark Attack" / "Shark's Counterattack!"; Transliteration: "Gyakushū no Shāku!" (Japanese: 逆襲のシャーク!)	Shin Yoshida	June 13, 2011	February 11, 2012
As Yuma's friends become curious as to the whereabouts of his Number cards outside of duels, Yuma learns that Shark had been skipping school since their duel. Yuma goes to challenge Shark to another duel, but he tells him that he's quit duelling. Yuma continues to challenge him the next day, getting him to agree to a duel by putting his key on the line, deciding he will try not to use his Numbers. Shark immediately summons out his key monster, Aero Shark, and starts calling on Yuma to bring out his Numbers. Yuma, realising there's more than pride on the line, summons out Utopia, but falls into a play by Shark. Shark then summons out another Xyz monster, Black Ray Lancer, which negates Utopia's effects to not be destroyed, and defeats Yuma, though he decides not to take Yuma's key. His friends get mad at him for using a Number, after he promised he wouldn't.
11	11	"The Pack: Part 1" / "Yuma and Shark: The Injury-Filled Tag Duel"; Transliteration: "Yuma to Shāku Kizu-darake no Taggude~yueru" (Japanese: 遊馬とシャーク 傷だらけのタッグデュエル)	Yoshifumi Fukushima	June 20, 2011	February 18, 2012
Bronk becomes annoyed with Yuma for breaking his promise to not use Numbers in his duel against Shark. Meanwhile, Shark learns that some of the delinquents he is hanging out with, Scorch and Chills, possess Number cards and a planning to steal a priceless deck from a museum. As one of the other delinquents chicken out on the heist, he goes to tell Yuma, who had been reading up on Shark's history, about the trouble Shark got into, after being disqualified and permanently banned from the duel Circuit after he looked at his opponent's deck, and finds out Shark's real name is Reginald Kastle. As Yuma confronts the three, Shark decides to side with Yuma in a Tag Duel. Meanwhile, Tori is trying to persuade Bronk to come with her to cheer Yuma and Shark on. Meanwhile, both Astral and Shark find Scorch and Chills' strategy suspicious, as they seem too confident that they will win. In the meantime, they use their advantage as a tag team to summon several level 5 monsters, allowing Scorch to summon his Number card, Number 61: Volcasaurus, and deal a lot of damage to both Shark and Yuma.
12	12	"The Pack: Part 2" / "Combo of Hope! Armored Xyz Activates!"; Transliteration: "Kibō no Gattai! Āmādo Ekushīzu Hatsudō!" (Japanese: 希望の合体! アーマード・エクシーズ発動!)	Yoshifumi Fukushima	June 27, 2011	February 25, 2012
Yuma strives to prevent Shark from being defeated by Scorch and Chills, who not only stop Utopia from attacking (and if he uses an overlay unit, he takes damage), but manage to summon Chills' Number, Number 19: Freezadon, which gives Volcasaurus more overlay units. Shark soon figures out that Scorch and Chills had been cheating, but this brings up the topic about how Shark got in serious trouble, he admitted he was scared of losing, and they called him a "cry baby." However, Yuma stands up for Shark and the two manage to knock Chills out. As Scorch makes it so the others may lose by his next Standby phase, Shark gives Yuma a spell card, Armored Xyz, which allows Yuma to equip Utopia to Shark's Black Ray Lancer and defeat Scorch. The two run. As Astral retrieves the two Numbers and learns of a terrible incident that happened to his world, Yuma makes up with Bronk whilst Shark allows Yuma to keep Armored Xyz.
13	13	"The Number Hunter: Part 1" / "Hunter of Souls! The Number Hunter Appears!"; Transliteration: "Tamashii o Karu Mono! Nanbāzu Hantā Genru!" (Japanese: 魂を狩る者! ナンバーズ・ハンター現る!)	Shin Yoshida	July 4, 2011	March 3, 2012
A thief wielding Number 56: Gold Rat holds a stickup at a mall where Yuma is attending. However, before Yuma and Astral can reach him, a Numbers Hunter with the ability to slow time (1/10,000 of a second) for everybody except people with numbers, Kite Tenjo, defeats him in a duel and forcibly takes his Number and his soul, leaving him old and decrepit. As Kite's younger brother Hart uses trash from Heartland City to attack Astral World, Kite converses with Mr. Heartland, revealing that the only reason Kite collects numbers was to cure Hart of an unknown illness, who then converses with the mastermind, Dr. Faker, who seeks to obtain the Number cards and destroy Astral World. The next day, as Yuma tries to save Tori from a speeding truck, time slows again and Yuma is confronted by Kite, who forces him into a duel. Kite immediately summons out two Numbers monsters in one turn, Number 10: Illumiknight and Number 20: Giga-Brilliant.
14	14	"The Number Hunter: Part 2" / "Galaxy-Eyes Photon Dragon Descends!"; Transliteration: "Gyarakushī Aizu Foton Doragon Kōrin!" (Japanese: 『銀河眼の光子竜』降臨!)	Shin Yoshida	July 11, 2011	March 10, 2012
Kite tributes his Numbers to Special Summon his ace monster, Galaxy-Eyes Photon Dragon, using its special ability to absorb Utopia's Overlay Units and grow stronger. Meanwhile, Mr. Heartland proposes a World Duel Carnival to Dr. Faker in order to draw out the Numbers, and Kite would participate. With both Astral's life and Yuma's soul at stake, Yuma starts to become paralyzed with fear but comes to his senses when he thinks of his father. However, both Yuma and Astral's tactics are seen through by Kite. As Kite is about to win the duel, he stops when he learns that Hart has collapsed from overusing his power and leaves. As time resumes, both Yuma and Astral are left, time going back to normal, getting depressed over their near-defeat.
15	15	"Training Days: Part 1" / "Battle at the Duel Sanctuary, Legendary Monsters Resurrect!!"; Transliteration: "Shitō, Kettōan, Densetsu no Monsutā Fukkatsu!!" (Japanese: 死闘、決闘庵 伝説のモンスター復活!!)	Yasuyuki Suzuki	July 18, 2011	March 17, 2012
Yuma and Astral are depressed after their duel, and Yuma tries to tell Astral to stop moping. Yuma hears about the World Duel Carnival through his friends, his grandma Haru sends him, Tori and Bronk to deliver vegetables to a strange man named Roku who lives in a temple. There, Yuma discovers a room filled with statues of legendary Duel Monsters, with Roku explaining that his home is a Duel Lodge where duelists train. He challenges Yuma to a duel using the statues and wooden cards. However, as the duel progresses, Yuma's consciousness is switched into the body of Dark Magician whilst Roku summons out Blue Eyes Ultimate Dragon and defeats him, giving him an understanding of fear from a Monster's point of view, as for they could not dodge attacks without a special ability. The next day, while Yuma is cleaning statues, he notices that one of the monsters was cut in half due to the line across it, and tells Master Roku. Roku is then approached by his former student, Kaze, who beats him in a duel before heading inside the temple to claim a Legendary Deck. However, Yuma decides to stand in his way and challenges him to a duel. Kaze summons out his Xyz monster, Blade Armor Ninja, dealing some damage to Yuma, who decides he wants to protect his monsters.
16	16	"Training Days: Part 2" / "The Deadliest Ninja Arts! The Most Terrifying Ninja!"; Transliteration: "Hissatsu Ninpō! Sai Osore Ninja Ara Waru!" (Japanese: 必殺忍法! 最恐忍者あらわる!)	Yasuyuki Suzuki	July 25, 2011	March 24, 2012
As Haru and Kari come to observe the duel, Yuma struggles against Kaze and loses a lot of life points, though his belief in his monsters allow him to make a comeback. However, Kaze then reveals he has a Number card, Number 12: Crimson Shadow Armor Ninja. Yuma soon remembers the feelings of the Monsters and manages to summon out Utopia to defeat Kaze. As Kaze once again tries to attack the same statue as he cut in half before, Yuma stands in front of him. Kaze then admits he came there to train after all of his friends betrayed him, hoping to start over, and he could no longer trust again. Roku says that he could train Kaze again, which he accepts. As the gang leaves, Roku decides to give Yuma the legendary deck, though Astral still has doubts over whether he can face Kite again, though snapped out of his depression.
17	17	"It's in the Cards: Part 1" / "The All-Seeing Fortune–Teller: The Terrifying Fortuneteller - Fortuno"; Transliteration: "Subete o Mitōsu Mono Kyōfu no Uranaishi Jin" (Japanese: すべてを見通す者 恐怖の占い師・ジン)	Kenichi Yamashita	August 1, 2011	March 31, 2012
As a Number Hunter named Fortuno retrieves more Number cards for Kite, Astral admits he is still too afraid to face Kite again. With Yuma refusing to tell them anything, Tori, Bronk, Caswell, Flip and Cat decide to form a Numbers Club and find out the secrets behind the Number cards. There investigation leads them to Fortuno who, after telling them about the Numbers, traps them. As Cat escapes to inform Yuma, Fortuno possesses her and tells Yuma to come and duel him in order to free his friends. Despite Astral's fears, Yuma goes to face Fortuno, who puts in a deep spot by seemingly reading his cards and bring out his Number card, Number 16: Shock Master. Worse yet, Fortuno reveals that as Yuma loses Life Points, the platform suspending his friends above a pit of lava starts to collapse.
18	18	"It's in the Cards: Part 2" / "Chaos Xyz Evolution! The Light of Aspiration: Utopia Ray!!"; Transliteration: "Kaosu Ekushīzu Chenji! Kibō no Hikari Hōpu Rei!!" (Japanese: カオスエクシーズ・チェンジ! 希望の光ホープ・レイ!!)	Kenichi Yamashita	August 8, 2011	April 7, 2012
Yuma manages to follow Astral's advice and bring out Utopia to beat Shock Master. However, Fortuno then summons out his Rank 7 Number, Number 11: Big Eye, which he uses to take control of Utopia. With Yuma's life points down to 100, Astral and Yuma start to doubt the existence of the Kite on the throne, and Cat jumps up there, and cuts off its head, proving it that the Kite wasn't real. Fortuno offers to release his friends if he surrenders, with Astral prepared to make that deal, even if it means his disappearance. However, Yuma rejects that idea as he considers Astral his friend as well. This makes Astral think that after all of their (Yuma's and Astral's) duels together, he is now feeling another human feeling: hope. This causes the ship inside Yuma's key's gears start to turn, and a beam of energy to be shot into Astral, revealing him to everyone long enough to believe that he's real. It also grants Yuma the power to perform a Chaos Xyz Evolution, turning Utopia into Chaos Number 39: Utopia Ray, defeating Fortuno. Shortly afterwards, Fortuno muses that he hidden his 3rd Number card in order to prevent Astral from claiming it. Just then, Kite Tenjo arrives, and Fortuno pledges loyalty to him, saying that he would do anything for Kite. However, the only thing that Kite wants is his Number card, and as a result, Kite takes Fortuno's Number and his soul, while thanking him for his loyalty.
19	19	"The Edge of the World" / "The Promised High-Fiving the Sky"; Transliteration: "Yakusoku no Kattobingu" (Japanese: 約束のかっとビング)	Shin Yoshida	August 15, 2011	April 14, 2012
School Spirit day is to take place at Yuma's school (on a Saturday), but when Yuma tries to tell both Kari and his grandmother, he finds out that both of them have plans that Saturday, so he decides not to tell either of them about School Spirit Day. When Yuma is running out of the house, Kari accuses Yuma of getting detention, but he evades telling them about School Spirit Day by telling both his sister and grandmother he just has to go. As Yuma forgets his key at home, he tells Astral about his father, Kazuma, who taught him all about 'feeling the flow'. One night, when he (Kazuma) and his wife Mira were caught by an earthquake, Kazuma allowed himself to fall down a chasm in order to keep Mira safe. Kazuma briefly ended up in another world where he encountered a being similar to Astral who gave him the Emperor's Key which he later gave to Yuma. As Kari ends up hearing about visitor's day from Bronk's sister, she remembers Yuma coming in to ask her something and how she said she was busy. She leaves her reunion party to go and pick up Haru, reminiscing about what her father once told her. Haru decides to leave her reunion party and they both show up to Spirit Day, surprising Yuma. Yuma cheers up and decides to try and jump 20 stacks. Astral asks him why he is smiling, and he says that his parents are watching him. Tori asks Bronk if he can really do it. He doesn't think so, but Tori and Cathy do and cheer him on with his family. Kari yells, "Hi-five the sky!" Haru yells "Go Yuma!". When he goes to jump, Yuma yells, "I am feeling the flow!"
20	20	"Roots of the Problem" / "The Pitch-Black Number: Dark Yuma VS Bronk"; Transliteration: "Shikkoku no Nanbāzu Yami Yūma vs Tetsuo" (Japanese: 漆黒のナンバーズ 闇遊馬vs鉄男)	Yoshifumi Fukushima	August 22, 2011	April 21, 2012
After Yuma wins a duel against another Number holder, Astral sees a vision of the Earth's destruction while Bronk gets mad at Yuma for his reckless tactics. They get into a fight, and they refuse to talk to each other. Yuma tries to reconcile with him, but Bronk accidentally knocks away Yuma's key. The Number card Yuma had won, Number 96: Dark Mist, takes over Astral and holds Yuma hostage. Before being taken over, Astral instructs Yuma to give Utopia to Bronk, who is protected by Yuma's key, and Number 96 mentions that only Yuma's body was being taken over, not his mind. Bronk challenges Number 96 to a duel, who controls Yuma to duel for him and summons a copy of itself (Dark Mists' card form), Number 96: Dark Mist, and reveals the monster they saw earlier was a fake version of him. It has the ability to steal the attack points of other monsters. Bronk summons Utopia, but he gets overwhelmed by Dark Mist's ability. However, Yuma manages to follow Astral's advice and pretend to side with Number 96, in order to advise him to destroy the wrong card and forget about the catapult, allowing Bronk to use the catapult to win, which allows Astral to return to normal and reabsorb Number 96. When he does, Astral wonders if there are other Numbers like Dark Mist. Also, Yuma's friends try and give Astral the entire credit for the idea of tricking Number 96.
21	21	"Battle with the Bot" / "Yuma VS The Litterbot, Lillybot"; Transliteration: "Yūma vs Osōji Robotto Obomi" (Japanese: 遊馬vsお掃除ロボット オボミ)	Yasuyuki Suzuki	August 29, 2011	April 28, 2012
While a burglar named Goda uses a group of Litterbots (cleaning robots) to rob a jewelry store, one of the Litterbots is left behind and races after the truck, and gets knocked into the river while protecting a family of ducks. The Litterbot is found with the family of ducks inside, and fixed by Yuma and his friends, who names it accidentally Lillybot and befriends it, and also finds out that she's a duelist. However, later that night, Lillybot is called by the Goda to participate in another robbery, which Yuma discovers the next morning, while Kari is making a report about it. Yuma finds that she accidentally left one of her cards, Memory Tree. With Astral's help, Yuma and friends find Goda, who sends in Lillybot to attack them. Yuma decides to duel Lillybot, who summons out its Xyz Monster, Wind-Up Zenmaister, while Yuma defends with his Gagaga Monsters, hoping to bring back Lillybot's memory of him. Just then, Goda activates a self-destruct timer on Lillybot, giving Yuma only one minute to win the duel. Yuma uses Memory Tree to summon Utopia, allowing him to win the Duel, stop the countdown, and return Lillybot to normal. As Goda is foiled by his own Litterbots, Lillybot starts living with Yuma, and talking lots of trash about him!
22	22	"The Shark Hunter" / "The Seized Emperor's Key! Showdown, Kite VS Shark"; Transliteration: "Ubawareta Ou no Kagi! Gekitotsu Kaito vs Shāku" (Japanese: 奪われた皇の鍵! 激突カイトvsシャーク)	Shin Yoshida	September 5, 2011	May 5, 2012
As Astral tells Yuma about the contraption inside his key, Kite learns that Yuma's key is not from this world and decides to obtain it for himself. He sends his robot, Orbital-7, to steal Yuma's key while he is swimming, but Shark stands in his way. Believing he possesses a Numbers card, Kite appears and challenges Shark to a duel. As Kite summons one of his Numbers, Number 30: Acid Golem of Destruction, Shark takes control of it, only to fall prey to its hidden effects. Kite defeats Shark, taking both his soul and Yuma's key, with Astral still inside it, even while Yuma and his friends arrive on the scene.
23	23	"Hunting Down The Hunter: Part 1" / "The Destined Duel! Astral VS Kite"; Transliteration: "Shukumei no Kettou! Asutoraru VS Kaito" (Japanese: 宿命の決闘！アストラルvsカイト)	Shin Yoshida	September 12, 2011	May 12, 2012
After admitting Shark into hospital, Yuma and friends get help from a reluctant Mr. Kay to help track down the key's location, because Caswell reminded him of all the destruction his Crashbug virus caused. Meanwhile, as Kite experiments on the key, he manages to find a way to enter the realm inside the key where he finds Astral and challenges him to a duel for all his Numbers. As the duel goes on, Astral's fear of facing Galaxy-Eyes Photon Dragon again puts him in a dire situation. As Yuma and his friends manage to break into Kite's hideout thanks to Kay, Astral decides to face his fear and stand up to Kite.
24	24	"Hunting Down The Hunter: Part 2" / "The Soul's Xyz Summon! ZEXAL"; Transliteration: "Tamashii no Ekushīzu Shōkan! Zearu" (Japanese: 魂のエクシーズ召喚！ZEXAL)	Shin Yoshida	September 19, 2011	May 19, 2012
While his friends distract the security robots, Yuma goes on ahead to hack into a terminal, where he learns about Hart and also sees a vision of the door he first saw, which tells him about a power known as Zexal. Yuma is then attacked by Orbital-7, and escapes into the room where the key was. Meanwhile, Astral summons Utopia while Kite summons Galaxy-Eyes Photon Dragon, proving to be a challenging opponent even after Astral summons out Utopia Ray. As Yuma manages to enter his key, he obtains the power of Zexal which allows him to merge with Astral, allowing them to summon the Zexal Weapon - Unicorn Spear and equip it to Utopia Ray. This allows them to destroy Galaxy-Eyes Photon Dragon; however, Kite manages to use Photon Shock to bring the Duel to a draw. After Kite returns Shark's soul, his hideout self-destructs, with Yuma barely managing to make it out alive. As Yuma survives the destruction, he witnesses Kite flying away in Orbital 7, telling Yuma their battle isn't over yet.
25	25	"Frozen in Time" / "The Time Comes, Three Suns Appear"; Transliteration: "Toki no Otozore, Arawareshi Mittsu no Taiyō" (Japanese: 時の訪れ 現われし3つの太陽)	Shin Yoshida	October 3, 2011	August 18, 2012
As Yuma and Astral contemplate the nature of Kite's Galaxy-Eyes Photon Dragon and why he is unaffected by the Numbers, time stops and three strange suns appear in the sky. The Yellow Sun is from Earth, the Blue Sun is from Astral World, and the Red Sun is from Barian World (which Kite and Astral are familiar with). Kite decides to hold an investigation of all the duels Astral and Yuma won and lost together, Astral joining in after he finds out someone is trying to look at his memories. Dr. Faker tells Mr. Heartland that energy waves from both Astral World and Barian World (indirectly mentioned) caused time on Earth to stop temporarily. Dr. Faker then says that the appearance of the 3 Suns indicate that both worlds are drawing closer to Earth, and that soon, the final stage shall be set, and it would be disastrous. As the suns disappear and time resumes again, Kite tells Yuma to come to the World Duel Carnival to settle things.
