= Yu-Gi-Oh! 5D's season 4 =

Yu-Gi-Oh! 5D's: Road to Destiny
- Season 4
- No. of episodes: 42 (only 29 dubbed)

Release
- Original network: TV Tokyo
- Original release: January 20 – November 10, 2010

Season chronology
- ← Previous; Season 3 Next → Season 5

The fourth season of Yu-Gi-Oh! 5D's lasts from episodes 93 to 134 (with the title Road to Destiny, in the English dub). As the WRGP begins (known as the "World Racing Grand Prix" in the English dub, while known as the "World Riding Duel Grand Prix" in the Japanese version), the 3 Emperors of Yliaster begin to make their move. The show uses seven pieces of theme music. For episodes 93 through 103, the opening theme is "Freedom" by La Vie, while the ending theme is 'O-Zone' by Vistlip. For episodes 104 to 129, the opening theme is "BELIEVE IN NEXUS" by Masaaki Endoh, while the ending theme is "Close to You" by Alvino ~Alchemy vision normal~. For episodes 130 to 154, the opening theme is "Road to Tomorrow - Going My Way!" (明日への道 Going My Way!, Ashita heno Michi - Going My Way!) by Masaaki Endoh, while the ending theme is "Future Colors" (みらいいろ, Miraiiro) by Plastic Tree. Certain episodes use the insert song: "Clear Mind" by Masaaki Endoh.

Yu-Gi-Oh! 5D's was licensed in North America by 4Kids Entertainment, and Seasons 4 and 5 was aired on 4Kids' Toonzai block between February 19 – September 10, 2011. However, a total of 31 episodes were left out (from Seasons 4 and 5) from the original Japanese broadcast, with the English dubbed series ending on September 10, 2011. This was due to a lawsuit from TV Tokyo.

The official Yu-Gi-Oh! YouTube channel counts the previous season, the 29 dubbed episodes of this season and the remaining two dubbed episodes of the next season as Season 2.

== Episode list ==
No. overall	No. in season	Title	Written by	Original release date	American air date
93	1	"The Question of the Card / Tremble in Fear! The Resolve of the Master and Servant!!"; Transliteration: "Senritsu! Shujū no Kakugo!!" (Japanese: 戦慄！ 主従の覚悟!!)	Kenichi Yamashita	January 20, 2010	February 19, 2011
Sherry tries to get answers concerning the card her parents were killed over (which is the Z-ONE spell card). She decides the best way to figure it out is to use the Public Security Maintenance Bureau's super computer. The next day, Sherry and Elsworth set off a dummy bomb at HQ, causing everyone to evacuate. When they lock the building down, Yusei and Bruno are left inside, and they soon discover the two. As Bruno follows after Sherry, Elsworth blocks Yusei off, and challenges him to a duel. Elsworth summons his Driven Daredevil, which does great damage to Yusei during his counterattack. Sherry reaches the main computer, hoping to find out the meaning behind her card, but starts fighting Bruno when he shows up. Just then, Bruno's eyes start glowing red and he overpowers Sherry. Noticing her card, he stops attacking and helps her to analyze it. Yusei summons Stardust Dragon and beats Elsworth with a counter trap, and the two catch up to Sherry and Bruno. As the card is scanned, purple clouds form in the sky and Sherry, Bruno, and Yusei are caught in the blast. They find themselves in a strange white room where they are scanned painfully by Z-ONE, and then pass out from the pain. Afterwards, the computer room self destructs. As Sector Security find the super computer destroyed, the others wake up on the docks, minus Sherry. Yusei suspects that this may be the work of Yliaster.
94	2	"Keeping a Promise, Part 1 / Recollections: Entrusted with a Friend's Dying Wish"; Transliteration: "Tsuioku Hōyū ga Takushita Ishi" (Japanese: 追憶 朋友が託した遺志)	Yoshifumi Fukushima	January 27, 2010	February 26, 2011
Crow goes to visit the grave of Robert Pearson, the original owner of Crow's Blackwing Deck and the Blackbird (Crow's duel runner), who died in an unusual purple fire three years ago. Later, Bruno finds a sealed compartment in Crow's Blackbird that he can't access, which is preventing him from giving Crow's duel runner some upgrades. Crow is later approached by Trudge and Mina, who believe Pearson's death was caused by a duelist using a card called, Crimson Mephist, that dealt real damage, and sent people to the Netherworld. Crow goes to see another of his old friends, Bolton, to ask about the accident. Bolton agrees to talk, but only if Crow duels him, wanting the Black-Winged Dragon card he needs for a loan should he win, even though Crow doesn't know where it is. Crow tells Yusei about how he met Pearson after leaving the Enforcers. The next day, Crow and Bolton start their duel, and Crow has trouble fighting against Bolton's Anti-Blackwing deck.
95	3	"Keeping a Promise, Part 2 / Soar! Black-Winged Dragon!!"; Transliteration: "Maiagare! Burakkufezā Doragon!!" (Japanese: 舞い上がれ！ ブラックフェザー・ドラゴン!!)	Yoshifumi Fukushima	February 3, 2010	March 5, 2011
As Crow continues his duel against Bolton, he makes a small comeback with his Blackwing Arms Wing. However, Bolton then summons out Crimson Mephist, revealing he was the one who killed Pearson. Pearson had refused to sell his Duel Runner rights for a large sum of cash, so Bolton took matters into his own hands. Crimson Mephist destroys Arms Wing and deals some real damage to Crow. As Crow wonders if he can win, he receives encouragement from the kids he's looked after. Crow's mark glows, which automatically keys in the password to unlocking the sealed compartment in Crow's Blackbird. And Black-Winged Dragon, which was hidden inside the compartment all along, reveals itself. Crow then summons it, and uses its special ability to defeat Bolton, who feels remorse for what he had done, and promises that he will change.
96	4	"Natural Instincts, Part 1 / Rally Forth! Team 5D's"; Transliteration: "Kessei! Chīmu Faibudīzu" (Japanese: 結成！ チーム5D's)	Shin Yoshida	February 10, 2010	March 12, 2011
Yusei, Jack and Crow finally complete their new Duel Runner engines, and they name their WRGP team Team 5D's. They have a practice run on the WRGP circuit. However, Crow refuses to stop when the practice session is over, and causes one of Team Unicorn's members to crash. As a way of apology, Yusei accepts a supposedly friendly duel with their "best" duelist, Andre. Unbeknownst to Yusei, the duel is really a means to learn his strategy. Andre gets a head start with his Green Baboon, before Yusei summons his Junk Archer. However, Andre responds by bringing out his Behemoth, putting Yusei in a tight spot.
97	5	"Natural Instincts, Part 2 / After Despair and Conflict..."; Transliteration: "Zetsubō to Kattō no Saki ni..." (Japanese: 絶望と葛藤の先に...)	Koji Ueda	February 17, 2010	March 19, 2011
Yusei manages to survive Andre's onslaught, but still takes a lot of damage to his life points, especially when Andre brings out his Synchro Monster. Yusei summons out Stardust Dragon and destroys his monster, but before Yusei can win using Speed World 2's effects, Team Unicorn's practice time ends, along with the duel. The next day, Sherry briefly visits Yusei to ask about the thing they both saw, and Martha's kids give Crow a banner they made. This inspires him to train, but he suddenly crashes and breaks his arm, leaving him unable to participate, so Akiza offers to take his place. Crow, while initially furious at the decision, offers to coach Akiza in her training.
98	6	"Power Plays / The WRGP Commences! Team 5D's VS Team Unicorn"; Transliteration: "Daburuyūārujīpī Kaisai Chīmu Faibudīzu Bāsasu Chīmu Yunikōn" (Japanese: WRGP開幕！ チーム5D's VS チームユニコーン)	Shin Yoshida	February 24, 2010	March 26, 2011
The WRGP Preliminaries begin with Team 5D's facing against Team Unicorn. Jack goes up first in the hopes of putting his Power Deck against Andre, who uses an overboost system to turn the corner first, and take the first turn. Jack summons out Red Dragon Archfiend, but takes a lot of damage thanks to Andre's strategy. Andre than summons out Thunder Unicorn, which puts Jack in a tighter spot. Bruno notices a problem in Jack's Duel Runner, but Jack refuses to take a pit stop, and manages to destroy Thunder Unicorn. Yusei realizes that they had been tricked by Team Unicorn into using a Power Deck, but it is too late, as Andre defeats Jack using Speed World 2's effects, the force of which causes his Duel Runner to crash.
99	7	"Trouble For Team 5D's / Burn! Phoenixian Cluster Amaryllis"; Transliteration: "Moero! Fenikishian Kurasutā Amaririsu" (Japanese: 燃えろ！ フェニキシアン・クラスター・アマリリス)	Shin Yoshida	March 3, 2010	April 2, 2011
Despite his injuries, Jack gets up to push his Duel Runner to the end of the lap to pass the baton over to Akiza, managing to do so before they are knocked out. Akiza immediately summons out Phoenixian Cluster Amaryllis to deal some damage to Andre. However during the next turn, Andre manages to remove it and bring back his Thunder Unicorn. The next turn, Akiza summons out Black Rose Dragon and, to everyone's surprise, Stardust Dragon, which Yusei had given her. However, Andre ends the battle phase before Stardust can attack and uses Thunder Unicorn to beat it. Before Andre can use Speed World 2's effect, Akiza wipes out her own life points to revive Stardust Dragon, in order to pass it on to Yusei. As Yusei continues the fight, Akiza laments that she couldn't help much, but finds encouragement from her parents and the crowd.
100	8	"The Edge of Elimination, Part 1 / Dilemma! The Last Turbo Duelist, Yusei"; Transliteration: "Kyūchi Rasuto Hoīrā Yūsei" (Japanese: 窮！ 地ラスト・ホイーラー遊星)	Koji Ueda	March 10, 2010	April 9, 2011
Yusei manages to destroy Andre's key Speed Spell card, but in doing so allows Andre to activate that, despite knocking himself out, takes a huge chunk out of Yusei's life points. Yusei then faces Team Unicorn's next duelist, Breo, who soon summons his Synchro monster, Voltic Bicorn. He soon destroys it however in order to implement his deck destruction tactic.
101	9	"The Edge of Elimination, Part 2 / For The Team"; Transliteration: "Foa Za Chīmu" (Japanese: フォア・ザ・チーム)	Toshifumi Kawase	March 17, 2010	April 16, 2011
Breo manages to destroy Stardust Dragon and leave Yusei with just five cards left. Yusei soon summons Junk Destroyer and knocks Breo out, leaving him just 1000 life points and four cards to face against Team Unicorn's final member and leader, Jean. Jean summons out Lightning Tricorn, but Yusei manages to avoid losing to Speed World 2's effects. However, Jean soon destroys Yusei's monsters and launches a direct attack at him.
102	10	"The Edge of Elimination, Part 3 / Just For Victory"; Transliteration: "Tada Shōri no Tame ni" (Japanese: ただ勝利の為に)	Kenichi Yamashita	March 24, 2010	April 23, 2011
Yusei survives Jean's attack and summons Stardust Dragon. He has trouble going up against Jean's strategy, but then Jack stumbles from his bed to give Yusei and the team morale. Yusei Fusion Summons Dragon Knight Draco-Equiste, a move Jean wasn't expecting, and the two continue to fight through the last of Yusei's deck. Jean manages to survive the strategy laid out by Yusei, and is in a position where he can just end the turn to win due to Yusei's deck not having any cards. However, the duel has given him a desire to fight, and after encouragement from Andre and Breo, Jean launches an attack, which ultimately backfires against him, after Yusei increases the defense points of Rapid Warrior, causing Jean to lose all of his life points, and ultimately, the duel.
103	11	"Party Crashers / The Spoils of Battle"; Transliteration: "Tatakai no Hate ni Etamono" (Japanese: 戦いの果てに得たもの)	Shin Yoshida	March 31, 2010	April 30, 2011
Jean give thanks to Yusei for the "fun duel," and the two teams promise to reach the WRGP finals together. As Team 5D's celebrates their victory in their garage, they are visited by Sherry, who had beaten three duelists by herself in her round. They discuss things about Yliaster, and how recent events have been related to them. Sherry reveals they are being targeted by Yliaster, due to them being Signers (not including Sherry). She also talks about the strange experience that she, Yusei, and Bruno had experienced back at Sector Security. After Sherry leaves, Bruno feels weird, and goes to the beach where he washed up upon. Upon finding a cat, it triggers his memory, and his eyes glow red again. The next day, as Yusei and Crow go to watch Team Unicorn's battle against Team Catastrophe, they arrive to find Team Unicorn's Duel Runners crashed, and Andre and Jean hospitalized.
104	12	"Knight Takes Pawn / Messengers of Destruction, Team Catastrophe"; Transliteration: "Hametsu no Shisha Chīmu Katasutorofu" (Japanese: 破滅の使者 チームカタストロフ)	Yoshifumi Fukushima	April 7, 2010	May 7, 2011
Team 5D's prepare to face up against Team Catastrophe, the leader of which, Nicholas, has been given a Card of Darkness by Primo. Team 5D's are later visited by Breo, and study the memory chips of Jean and Andre's Duel Runners, revealing something had caused their wheels to suddenly lock up and crash, the same reason why Crow crashed. After studying a video Carly gave them, the Signers believe it to be linked to a monster called Hidden Knight Hook. Akiza gets hit by the same phenomenon, and her psychic powers fail, as she loses it, to save her from getting injured. (And, Akiza's psychic powers don't return until Episode 140, after the Ark Cradle appears.) Despite his arm not being fully healed, Crow decides to take her place in their match against Team Catastrophe. The first round sees Crow against Hermann, who instantly summons Hidden Knight Hook. As it uses its effect against Crow's attack, Crow notices a strange hook aim for his wheel and barely manages to avoid it. It becomes clear to the others that this isn't a normal card.
105	13	"Rook Takes Knight / The Card of Darkness - Hidden Knight Hook"; Transliteration: "Yami no Kādo Hidun Naito -Hukku-" (Japanese: 闇のカード ヒドゥン・ナイト －フック－)	Yoshifumi Fukushima	April 14, 2010	May 14, 2011
Crow continues to bear the pain of his arm, whilst he avoids Hidden Knight Hook's assaults on his Duel Runner. He eventually manages to destroy it, and knock Hermann out by summoning out his Black-Winged Dragon, but when Hermann tries to revive his Hidden Knight Hook, Crow sacrifices his dragon in order to completely destroy Hidden Knight Hook before it can attack him, and then defeats Hermann. His arm at the peak of his pain, Crow passes the duel on to Jack, who begins the next round against Nicholas. Nicholas uses another Card of Darkness, a trap intended to knock both of them out, however it hurts both of them, as Primo has no more use for Nicholas, and allowed his protection against the Card of Darkness to expire. Jack escapes defeat, thanks to his monster's special ability, and rescues Nicholas before he crashes. With Nicholas' Duel Runner destroyed, Team 5D's automatically qualifies for the quarterfinals. Meanwhile, Primo unleashes his army of Ghosts (collectively known as "The Diablo") throughout the city.
106	14	"Primo's Plan, Part 1 / Ghost Flood! The Terrifying Battle Royale Mode"; Transliteration: "Gōsuto Hanran! Kyōfu no Batoru Roiyaru Mōdo" (Japanese: ゴースト氾濫！ 恐怖のバトル・ロイヤル・モード)	Shin Yoshida	April 21, 2010	May 21, 2011
Sherry tries to get the Card of Darkness off of Nicholas, but its card face disappears as soon as she touches it. Meanwhile, the Ghosts start attacking other duelists, overwhelming them with Battle Royale Mode, which makes the battle damage of a duel real. Yusei, Jack, Sherry, Elsworth and Kaz go to help what duelists they can. Aggravated and tired of constantly having his own plans thwarted, Primo orders the Ghosts to gang up on Yusei, who is joined by Sherry and Elsworth. Although they gain the upper hand with their Synchro Monsters, they are soon overwhelmed by the enormous number of Ghosts, and Sherry and Elsworth are taken out, leaving only Yusei to stop them.
107	15	"Primo's Plan, Part 2 / Wake Up!! Unwavering Standpoint - Clear Mind"; Transliteration: "Kakusei!! Yuruganaki Kyōchi Kuria Maindo" (Japanese: 覚醒!! 揺るがなき境地 クリア・マインド)	Shin Yoshida	April 28, 2010	May 28, 2011
Noticing Yusei is in trouble, Bruno, having regained his memories, remembers his mission to protect Yusei and to stop the Yliaster trio at all costs, after being reminded by Z-ONE, transforms into Vizor, calls over his duel runner, and helps Yusei evade the Ghosts. Primo becomes agitated and joins the duel himself. Bruno teaches Yusei about Accel Synchro, about how Ener-D powers through people's hearts and the Clear Mind that can control it. Taking these things into account, Yusei accelerates to top speed and is able to see a new monster. Bruno, who had lost his memory after previously battling Primo, stays behind to duel him again. Meanwhile, Yusei arrives at a crater, where another stone tablet has landed. Upon touching it, he is transported to the white room he had gone to before, and receives an Accel Synchro card. Upon seeing that Yusei had received a tablet from Z-ONE, Lester panics and tells Jakob that since the tablet didn't belong to any one of them, he asks him what is going on. Lester also becomes jealous and upset, because only the Emperors of Yliaster were supposed to receive tablets, but Yusei was only a "puny human," and Lester refuses to believe that Yusei was as special as they were. But Jakob remains silent and continues watching the duel. Primo brings out his Machine Emperor Wisel Infinity, and Bruno summons the materials for his Accel Synchro, but is hindered by the arrival of the Ghosts. After learning that Yusei had received a tablet, Jakob warns Primo not to duel Yusei, as he cannot guarantee him victory this time, with Lester presaging evidence. Then, Jakob demands Primo to return at once. Having been fed up by his partners bossing him around, Primo bangs his hand against his viewscreen, and cuts of the communication, which causes Jakob to shout, "But, Primo--!" Seeing that Primo had disobeyed orders again, Jakob tells Lester that the outcome of this duel "is the will of God." Yusei arrives and challenges Primo who is revealed to be a cyborg, transforms and combines with his Duel Runner. Then, he challenges a very shocked Yusei to continue the duel.
108	16	"Primo's Plan, Part 3 / The Revived Terror - Machine Emperor Wisel Infinity"; Transliteration: "Yomigaeru Kyōfu Kikōtei Waizeru" (Japanese: 蘇る恐怖 機皇帝ワイゼル∞)	Koji Ueda	May 5, 2010	June 4, 2011
After Yusei and Bruno mutter about this transformation being Primo's true form, Primo demonstrates to Yusei one of his new abilities. He causes his Machine Emperor to create a field of energy, which causes glass everywhere in New Domino City to shatter, and results in blackouts. Remembering the destruction caused by the original Ener-D reactor spun in reverse, Yusei screams, "Stop," and rams Primo's duel runner. Startled, he loses concentration and the destruction stops. Frustrated, he calls Yusei "inferior." When Yusei demands Primo to resume the duel, Primo rides up besides Yusei, and then activates his own battle Royale Mode. Yusei begins his duel with Primo by summoning out Junk Destroyer and manages to deal some damage. Primo becomes furious, and gets his Machine Emperor Wisel to create another field of energy, which results in lightning bolts striking everywhere in New Domino City, causing electrical devices to fail. Yusei manages to stop Primo absorbing Junk Destroyer by replacing it with Stardust Dragon, before sacrificing it to deal more damage. Primo then replaces one of his Wisel parts with Skiel parts stolen from Lester. When Lester realizes that Primo stole 2 of his cards, by watching the duel, he becomes furious, and curses Primo for taking his cards without his permission. Yusei tries to perform an Accel Synchro with Stardust Dragon and a Synchro Tuner, but Primo's words breaks his concentration, making him unable to perform it, allowing Wisel to absorb Stardust Dragon.
109	17	"Primo's Plan, Part 4 / Accel Synchro! Be Born, Shooting Star Dragon!"; Transliteration: "Akuseru Shinkuro! Shōraiseyo! Shūtingu Sutā Doragon!" (Japanese: アクセル・シンクロ！ 生来せよ シューティング・スター・ドラゴン！)	Koji Ueda	May 12, 2010	June 11, 2011
With Stardust Dragon absorbed by Machine Emperor Wisel Infinity, Yusei becomes frustrated over why his attempt at performing an Accel Synchro didn't work. Barely managing to survive Primo's attacks, Yusei eventually manages to retrieve Stardust Dragon. Primo uses his Machine Emperor to start a tornado to affect the city, also putting a child named Haruka in danger, but Akiza manages to save her without using her psychic powers. Then, Primo has Wisel create another field of energy, this one to torture Yusei, panting, and in pain, the marks of the other Signers reflect the pain that Yusei is feeling. Regaining his determination and clearing his mind, Yusei finally manages to perform an Accel Synchro, and summons Shooting Star Dragon, which flies into the tornado, and disperses it, and then flies up into the sky to shine its light on New Domino City. Lester than complains that something bad had showed up, and asks Jakob, what should be done, to which he simply murmurs to himself: "The fate assigned by God is already falling away from our hands. Is the power of humans coming before us? We must watch carefully."
110	18	"Primo's Plan, Part 5 / The Three Emperors of Yliaster"; Transliteration: "Iriasuteru no Sankōtei" (Japanese: イリアステルの三皇帝)	Shin Yoshida	May 19, 2010	June 18, 2011
Noticing the light caused by Shooting Star Dragon, Jack and Crow decide to heads towards Yusei. Yusei uses Shooting Star Dragon's special ability, which allows him to once-per turn, draw the top 5 cards of his deck, and Shooting Star Dragon can attack the number of times equal to the number of tuner monster cards drawn. Yusei then takes the marks of the Signers, which allows him to draw 5 tuner monster cards, one per mark (including his own). Yusei then gains the Seal of the Crimson Dragon, with the result of Yusei's lucky draws shocking Primo. When Yusei attacks, Primo manages to block the first 2 attacks by sacrificing Wisel Guard, but the remaining 3 attacks causes him to lose. Primo is unable to believe it, and questions if he was being done in by a human. Then, the rest of Machine Emperor Wisel collapse onto Primo and explode, causing Primo to scream as he loses the rest of his life points. Having been defeated, Primo crashes into the wall on the dueling lane, and his body splits off his duel runner, and he falls into a coma. Jack, Crow, Yusei and Vizor find themselves facing Lester and Jakob, who reveal themselves to be the emperors of Yliaster, who have come to pick up Primo, in order to have him repaired by Z-ONE. They claim that Yliaster is an organization created by their God, Z-ONE, to set the future on the right path whenever humans "alter" it, especially after it was altered by the creation of Ener-D, with a plan to destroy New Domino City. Sherry and Elsworth arrive and attack Jakob and Lester, but are overpowered. Jakob then receives his tablet, granting him Machine Emperor Grannel Infinity. They then retreat, telling Yusei and the others they will fight in the WRGP, in which they will find the answers they seek. As New Domino City recovers from the carnage, Yusei and his friends prepare themselves for the upcoming battle.
111	19	"The Ancient Land - To Nazca!"; Transliteration: "Inishie no Chi Nasuka e" (Japanese: 古の地 ナスカヘ！)	Yasuyuki Suzuki	May 26, 2010	N/A
Greiger has a vision of Jack being destroyed by his own power, so calls both him and Yusei over to the Nazca plains. He talks about how he had built a temple to help seal off the Earthbound Immortals, but lately has been troubled by the appearance of what's known as the Crimson Devil. Greiger warns Jack that using his general power tactics will destroy him, but Jack insists he can only fight using power. Greiger suggests a turbo duel, but Jack is surprised to find his opponent is his little brother, Max, who appears to be possessed by something. Jack summons out Red Dragon Archfiend but finds himself having trouble against Max's special deck. When Jack attacks, he finds himself attacked by his own power just like Greiger's dream, and the duel is called off. Jack becomes defiant about abandoning his power tactic and drives off.
112	20	"The Crimson Devil"; Transliteration: "Guren no Akuma" (Japanese: 紅蓮の悪魔)	Yasuyuki Suzuki	June 2, 2010	N/A
Jack arrives at an abandoned village where he encounters a strange Familiar, a flame demon who reveals himself to be the Crimson Devil's servant, who offers him a chance to gain great power. When Jack declares that he wants power great enough to overcome anything, the Familiar tells him to join the Crimson Devil at the shrine, and places Jack under a trance. Meanwhile, Greiger comes to a conclusion that the actions of him and Max were those of the Crimson Devil. Jack, seemingly in a trance, goes into a temple that Greiger had built, leading him to where the Familiar challenges him to a duel. Yusei and company try to follow but are stopped from interfering by the Familiar, who reveals that if Jack loses, his body will become a host to the Crimson Devil, and cuts them off from Jack by creating a very narrow platform, and seals off the only exit. The Familiar announces that he, Greiger, and Max will all become sacrifices to the Crimson Devil. Jack struggles against the Familiar's Abyss deck, which punishes power play and inflicts damage to Jack each time he tries to attack. It is soon revealed that the Crimson Devil is actually an Earthbound Immortal known as Scar-Red Nova, which was so fierce that even the Dark Signers didn't dare to resurrect it. Then, a geoglyph in the shape of a serpent forms on the surface and also in the sky, which traps Greiger's younger sister, Anna, in the process.
113	21	"Blazing Soul! Scar-Red Nova Dragon"; Transliteration: "Moe Tagiru Tamashī! Sukāreddo Nova Doragon" (Japanese: 燃え滾る魂！ スカーレッド・ノヴァ・ドラゴン)	Yasuyuki Suzuki	June 9, 2010	N/A
Jack summons out Red Dragon Archfiend, but is still hampered by the Familiar's Abyss deck, though eventually manages to deal some damage. The Familiar tries to use the Crimson Devil's power to knock Jack off his platform, but he hangs in there and declares that his "blazing soul" would keep him fighting on. Greiger is reminded of a legendary Signer called "Blazing Soul," who appeared 10,000 years ago when the Crimson Dragon was being overwhelmed by Scar-Red Nova. The legendary Signer used the power of Blazing Soul alongside the Crimson Dragon and defeated Scar-Red Nova; Greiger believes Jack to be his descendant. Jack starts to play more strategically and deals more damage to the Familiar. The Familiar becomes angry and summons a powerful monster, bringing the release of Scar-Red Nova closer. Just then, Jack produces a Blazing Soul and, with the help of the Crimson Dragon, also known as Quetzalcoatl, uses a blank card to seal the Crimson Devil forever into Red Dragon Archfiend, and he performs a "Double Tuning" on Red Dragon Archfiend to summon a new monster, Scar-Red Nova Dragon. Then, Jack uses Scar-Red Nova Dragon's "Blazing Soul" attack to defeat the Familiar, who is later killed by a collapsing wall during the destruction of the temple, due to the power of the dragon's attack. With the help of the Crimson Dragon, everyone manages to escape the temple safely, and Jack and Yusei return home with their new powers of Clear Mind, and Blazing Soul.
114	22	"Operation Capture Lazar II"; Transliteration: "Yēgā Hokaku Sakusen Tsū" (Japanese: イェーガー捕獲作戦II)	Toshifumi Kawase	June 16, 2010	N/A
Yusei and the others catch Lazar in disguise stealing some instant noodles. Wanting to find out more about Yliaster, they corner him, but he manages to escape. Hoping to lure him out, the gang hold a fake noodle product launch where people duel Crow in a mascot outfit for a chance to win some noodles. Lazar eventually shows up in another disguise, and whilst they fail to trap him, they manage to put a tracer on him and track him down. Crow challenges him to a duel to get information about Yliaster out of him. Lazar brings out his Jester Lord and seals Crow's tuner monster abilities, but Crow manages to make a comeback and destroy it. As Lazar's family show up to spectate, Lazar makes a comeback with his Jester Queen. Crow holds back his attack out of consideration for Lazar's family, leaving him with the choice of how to end it. Lazar decides to lose and tell the others about Yliaster.
115	23	"Press Him About The Mystery!! The Endgame Turbo Duel!"; Transliteration: "Nazo ni Semare! Tsume Raidingu Dyueru!!" (Japanese: ライディングデュエル!! 謎に迫れ！)	Kenichi Yamashita	June 23, 2010	N/A
The (Signers) gang, along with Sherry, interrogate Lazar about Yliaster. After some mistarts, involving him just talking about his family and love of cup ramen, Lazar eventually leads them to an arcade game where a puzzle duel is required to be cleared in order to access a hidden database. With three chances, Lazar fails the first time as he does not deal enough damage to win. Akiza uses her knowledge of Turbo Duels to win instead. However, Jack makes a miscalculation in the second round and loses the second credit, leaving Yusei to clear the round himself. With the game cleared, Lazar accesses the data, which reveals the company who sent the three Yliaster members to the Public Information Security Bureau, The Ener-D Express Development Agency.
116	24	"The Ener-D Express Development Agency"; Transliteration: "Mōmento Ekusupuresu Kaihatsu Kikō" (Japanese: モーメント・エクスプレス開発機構)	Shin Yoshida	June 30, 2010	N/A
Yusei, Sherry and Bruno infiltrate the Ener-D Express Headquarters, disguised as representatives of Bolger's company. There, they are shown a new Infinity shaped Ener-D reactor by Clark Smith, which is supposedly designed to allow Turbo duelists to travel through wormholes. Wanting to learn more, they sneak into Clark's office to obtain an access key for Level 10 clearance. When Clark returns, Yusei holds him off by challenging him to a duel with some new rules Clark throws in whilst Sherry and Bruno head for the restricted area. Clark's duel requires players to declare the type of card they want and successfully pick the right one in order to use it. However, Clark gains an advantage by cheating using his glasses. Realizing this, Yusei manages to summon Stardust Dragon and defeats him. However, Clark had already figured out their identities and sets off the alarm. While trying to escape with the file on Yliaster, Yusei, Sherry and Bruno are trapped in a shuttle, which positions itself over the Ener-D reactor as it is about to activate.
117	25	"The Distorted Past"; Transliteration: "Yugamerareta Kako" (Japanese: 歪められた過去)	Shin Yoshida	July 7, 2010	N/A
Clark reveals that he killed Sherry's parents for discovering the secret behind Infinity, which was being used by Yliaster to change history. He sends Yusei, Sherry and Bruno into a wormhole, in which they are doomed to break up and crash. Sherry uses her card to regain control of the shuttle, but ends up getting sucked out. Yusei and Bruno enter a "warped" dimension in the future, and pass by a strange island (a gigantic, floating, upside-down "metallic fortress", the Ark Cradle), where Yusei is briefly visited again by his father, who warns him of an Ener-D that will destroy mankind, before returning him and Bruno to their homeworld (the Present). Unhappy with Clark's actions, Yliaster erases Clark from existence, which spreads a blast of white light across New Domino City. Another WRGP team, Team Ragnarok, also notices the blast, but were protected by their Nordic God cards. Yusei and Bruno regroup with the other Signers, who were defended from the blast by their Signer marks. They also spot the strange metallic island, the Ark Cradle, coming through an interdimensional "hole" in the sky, which only Signers and people from Team Ragnarok can see, along with people that come into physical contact with them. When they try returning to the Ener-D Express, they discover that it has disappeared (as Yliaster's actions have also erased that company from existence). They later return to find the Yliaster trio joining the WRGP, and that Sherry's team had vanished from the roster (in other words, Sherry was "kicked out" of the WRGP, with Yliaster replacing her team), coming to the conclusion that Yliaster had managed to alter history. When Trudge and Mina inform the others that the WRGP may be cancelled following the recent incidents, Lazar decides to take the position of director in order to overturn the situation. Meanwhile, Sherry wakes up in a strange dimension where she meets a strange being in the form of her father, who is really Z-ONE who has taken the form of her father, offers to show her the future of the world. Z-ONE warns Sherry that seeing the future would change her destiny forever (because the vision would convince her to join Z-ONE), but Sherry replies that she doesn't care, and that she still wants to see the future, as she states that knowing the future ahead of time would benefit her, and her friends. Then, Z-ONE proceeds to show her the future.
118	26	"The New Rivals"; Transliteration: "Aratanaru Raibaru" (Japanese: 新たなるライバル)	Yoshifumi Fukushima	July 14, 2010	N/A
After reading up on Team Ragnarok, Leo runs into another WRGP team, Team Taiyo, and injures his knee. After taking Leo to fix up his knee, they tell him about their precious Duel Runner, which got banged up in the Ghost incident, though one of the members, Jinbei, shows disdain for offers of help. Leo gets Yusei and Bruno to help them fix it, and despite Jinbei's objections, the others allow them to help. Meanwhile, Jack, Crow and Akiza attend an exhibition duel featuring Team Ragnarok, with one of their members, Dragan, challenging Jack to a duel. Jack summons out Red Dragon Archfiend, whilst Dragan brings out his Aesir, Thor. As Thor attacks, the powers of both monsters starts to resonate, and causes a quake, forcing Lazar to end the duel before damage can be done. After Yusei finishes fixing Team Taiyo's Duel Runner, he and the others learn they will be facing them in the quarterfinals.
119	27	"The Invincible Scrum! Smash The Unbreakable Defense!"; Transliteration: "Teppeki no Sukuramu! Kyōkō Shubi wo Uchikudake!" (Japanese: 鉄壁のスクラム！ 強硬守備を打ち砕け！)	Yoshifumi Fukushima	July 21, 2010	N/A
As Team 5D's prepares to go against Team Taiyo, they grow curious from having seen their deck, which consists of mostly normal cards. Taro recalls how he managed to get his team together and enter into the WRGP. The first round starts with Jack going against Yoshizo. Yoshizo brings out Holding Hands Majin to solidify his defense, even managing to defend against Red Dragon Archfiend. It soon becomes apparent that Taiyo's plan is to provide an invincible defense whilst attacking with Speed World 2's effects. Jack manages to equalize their life points, and soon manages to negate Holding Hands Majin's effect and destroy it, however, Team Taiyo have another plan waiting.
120	28	"Tie Those Feelings! The Hand Tied to the Majin!"; Transliteration: "Omoi wo Tsunage! Te wo Tsunagu Majin" (Japanese: 想いをつなげ！ 手をつなぐ魔人！)	Toshifumi Kawase	July 28, 2010	N/A
Jack beats Yoshizo by countering against Speed World 2's effects, and now faces against Team Taiyo's second member, Junbei, who summons another Holdin Hands Majin. Junbei remembers when he got mad and ran away from home, encountering a man named Mizuru in a sports car. Whilst accompanying him, Mizuru knocks a thug member's duel runner and is chased. When some of Mizuru's friends get captured and Mizuru is too scared to go back, Junbei goes back to face the thugs, and is rescued by Taro and Yoshizo. Back in the present, Jack tries a trick to knock both him and Junbei out, but Junbei manages to survive the attack. Crow continues the battle, who uses the combined efforts of Blackwing Armor Master and Black-Winged Dragon to defeat Junbei. As Taro enters the duel, Yusei suspects that Taro has a plan that will cause them to lose within a few turns.
121	29	"The Miraculous Trump Card - Zushin the Sleeping Giant!"; Transliteration: "Kiseki no Kirifuda Nemureru Kyojin Zushin!" (Japanese: 奇跡の切り札 眠れる巨人ズシン！)	Shin Yoshida	August 4, 2010	N/A
Yusei reveals that Taro's plan is to sacrifice a level 1 monster that has been on the field for ten of his turns so he can summon his trump card, Zushin the Sleeping Giant. When the crowd gets word of this, they start cheering for Team Taiyo, along with the people from their hometown. Crow's attempts to destroy the sacrifice fails, allowing Taro to summon out Zushin, which defeats Crow. Yusei takes over, and brings out Stardust Dragon to battle against Taro.
122	30	"Believe in the Power! The Strongest Giant Zushin VS Shooting Star Dragon"; Transliteration: "Shinjiru Chikara! Saikyō no Kyojin Zushin Bāsasu Shūtingu Sutā Doragon" (Japanese: 信じる力！ 最強の巨人ズシン VS シューティング・スター・ドラゴン)	Kenichi Yamashita	August 11, 2010	N/A
Yusei manages to deal some damage to Taro, by taking advantage of Stardust Dragon's Defense Mode. As Taro begins his counter attack, Yusei Accel Synchro Summons Shooting Star Dragon. However, Taro activates his own trap, which puts Yusei under the safety line for Speed World 2's effects. Yusei uses the cards left over from Jack and Crow to negate Zushin's effects, and defeat Taro. Despite their loss, Team Taiyo are praised by the crowd for their efforts. After the defeat of Taro, another part of the Infinity Circuit lights up, and the Three Emperors of Yliaster gloat about winning the WRGP, and finally setting their plan in motion. Then, the Ark Cradle appears in the sky.
123	31	"Eyes on the Prize / The Duelists with the Rune Eyes"; Transliteration: "Rūn no Hitomi no Dyuerisuto" (Japanese: ルーンの瞳のデュエリスト)	Toshifumi Kawase	August 18, 2010	June 25, 2011
Noticing the appearance of the Ark Cradle (also known as the "Divine Temple") in the sky, Yusei, Jack and Crow go over to investigate, where they run into Team Ragnarok's members, Halldor, Broder and Dragan, who all possess a Rune Eye, similar to the Crimson Dragon marks. Halldor tells them about he got his Rune Eye and his Aesir, later recruiting Dragan and Broder, and uniting them with their powers. Dragan explains that three years ago, his father got hospitalized following a cave in. In order to pay for his hospital bills, Dragan had to follow Goodwin's orders and throw a match against Jack, along with his pride as a duelist. With both sides desiring to fight against Yliaster, the two teams decide to settle things in the semifinals.
124	32	"Duel for Redemption / Damaged Pride"; Transliteration: "Kizutsukerareta Puraido" (Japanese: 傷つけられたプライド)	Yoshifumi Fukushima	August 25, 2010	July 2, 2011
Jack gets the truth behind the fixed duels out of Lazar, who confirms what Dragan had told him. Jack becomes irritated as a result, so Yusei suggests he use the WRGP duel to regain his pride. In the match between Team 5D's and Team Ragnarok the next day, Jack and Dragan start off, and are surprised to find out that their starting hands are the same as their previous duel. Realizing the chance to do things properly, the two replicate their first turns from that match, this time, with Dragan being able to use his trap card, which Jack counters with his own. Dragan then brings out his Aesir, Thor, which manages to destroy Jack's Red Dragon Archfiend.
125	33	"Soul Solutions / Fighting Souls! Thor, Lord of the Aesir VS Red Nova Dragon"; Transliteration: "Tamashī no Tatakai! Kyokushin'ō Tōru Vāsasu Sukāreddo Nova Doragon" (Japanese: 魂の戦い！ 極神皇トールVSスカーレット・ノヴァ・ドラゴン)	Yoshifumi Fukushima	September 1, 2010	July 9, 2011
As Dragan continues his attack, Jack starts to take real damage from Thor. However, Jack starts to make a comeback and summons out Red Nova Dragon. However, Dragan activates traps which weaken Red Nova Dragon, and protects Thor. Jack manages to pull off a tactic to return Red Nova Dragon to its full power, destroying Thor and defeating Dragan. However, before he loses, Dragan revives Thor and deals damage to Jack.
126	34	"When Nordic Gods Attack / Descend! The Second Nordic God - Loki, Lord of the Aesir"; Transliteration: "Kōrin! Daini no Kami Kyokushin'ō Roki" (Japanese: 降臨！ 第二の神 極神皇ロキ)	Yasuyuki Suzuki	September 8, 2010	July 16, 2011
Ragnarok's 2nd turbo duelist, Broder, takes over and uses Thor's special abilities to knock Jack out. Crow enters the fight, but his attacks prove ineffective against Broder's traps, and he takes a lot of damage from Thor's attacks. Noticing the support Crow gets from the children, Broder explains how he came across a similar group of children, expressing his desire to fight Yliaster in order to protect them. Crow brings out Black-Winged Dragon, but Broder brings out his Aesir, Loki, which destroys Crow's Black-Winged Dragon.
127	35	"Tricking the Trickster / Fierce Fight! Destiny Riding on Blackwings"; Transliteration: "Gekitō! Unmei wo Kaketa Kuroi Hane!" (Japanese: 激闘！ 運命を賭けた黒い羽)	Yasuyuki Suzuki	September 15, 2010	July 23, 2011
With just 50 life points left, Crow's supporters almost get into danger while trying to cheer him on, reinvigorating Crow's resolve, and he soon manages to revive Black-Winged Dragon. Then, Crow activates a trap card from the Graveyard, which clashes with Broder's trap, knocking them both out. Yusei begins his round against Halldor, who quickly summons his Aesir, Odin.
128	36	"Yusei's Last Stand / The Three Immortal Aesirs! Cry out, Majestic Star Dragon!"; Transliteration: "Fujimi no Sankyokushin! Sakebe, Seivā Sutā Doragon!" (Japanese: 不死身の三極神！ 叫べ、セイヴァー・スター・ドラゴン！)	Shin Yoshida	September 22, 2010	July 30, 2011
Yusei must now face the power of Halldor and all three Aesirs. As Yusei expresses his desire to defeat Yliaster and see his father again, he gains the Seal of the Crimson Dragon, and summons out Majestic Star Dragon. However, Halldor manages to learn Yusei's strategy, and executes a successful counter. Halldor then activates a continuous trap card from his Graveyard, Gjallarhorn.
129	37	"Fight to the Finish Line / Gjallarhorn! Countdown To the End"; Transliteration: "Gyararuhorun! Shūen eno Kauntodaun" (Japanese: ギャラルホルン！ 終焉へのカウントダウン)	Shin Yoshida	September 29, 2010	August 6, 2011
Yusei faces not only all three Aesirs, but also a countdown from Halldor's trap card, Gjallarhorn, of which the end of the countdown means that the opponent takes damage equal to the combined attack points of all 3 Aesirs, at the cost of removing from play all 3 Aesirs in order to activate the effect, once the countdown has reached its end. At the End Phase of each of Halldor's turns, Gjallarhorn will gain 1 counter, and once it has 3 counters, its effects will activate. Which means that Yusei has only 3 turns to defeat Halldor. Yusei also had to face Halldor's increasing defense. However, Yusei summons out Shooting Star Dragon and deals some damage, before using the trap, Zero Force, to reduce all 3 Aesirs attack points to 0, resulting in Yusei taking 0 points of damage when the countdown reached its end. Now that all 3 of the Aesirs Cards have been removed from play, Yusei then has Shooting Star Dragon attack Halldor directly, allowing Yusei to win.
130	38	"Bound To The Future, Bonds To Our Companions"; Transliteration: "Mirai he Tsunagu, Nakama tono Kizuna" (Japanese: 未来へつなぐ、仲間との絆)	Shin Yoshida	October 6, 2010	N/A
Team 5D's have finally beaten Team Ragnarok after an exhausting battle. With this result, the World Racing Grand Prix (WRGP)'s finals will be Team 5D's Vs. Team New World (the 3 emperors of Yliaster). With the finals looming, Carly ponders the possible outcomes of the upcoming battle, while she writes up her special feature article about Team 5D's. While performing the interview, Akiza and company accidentally reconfirm their bonds. Noticing Carly's struggle to write up an article about Team 5D's, not helped by Mina's interference, Akiza, Luna and Leo decide to help her write profiles for each member, recalling on their past adventures. In addition, when Carly talks to Akiza, they discuss the relation of their new opponents, Team New World, to the organization of Yliaster, and the trio's schemes, causing Carly to gain unthinkable information. When Carly was finished typing all of the information down, Stephanie comes in with a teapot full of hot coffee. She trips on a wire and the coffee spills all over the computer, erasing all of the files, which ruins Carly's report.
131	39	"The Beginning of the End / Fight for the Future! Machine Emperor Skiel Infinity VS Red Nova Dragon"; Transliteration: "Mirai wo Kaketa Tatakai! Kikōtei Sukieru Vāsasu Sukāreddo Nova Doragon" (Japanese: 未来を賭けた戦い！ 機皇帝スキエル∞ VS スカーレッド・ノヴァ・ドラゴン)	Toshifumi Kawase	October 13, 2010	August 13, 2011
In another dimension, Z-ONE (who has now returned to his original form) shows Sherry a vision of the future, where everything on Earth is destroyed because of a global Ener-D explosion. Then, Z-ONE brings Sherry into the Ark Cradle, which is already emerging into the Yu-Gi-Oh! dimension. That night, the Signers are messaged by the Three Emperors of Yliaster, who tell them about the floating metallic island, the Ark Cradle, where a God called Yliadus (Z-ONE's real name) supposedly sleeps, stating that if they win the WRGP, then Yliadus will awaken and have New Domino City destroyed, but will rebuild it the way the trio wants it to be, which is without the existence of Ener-D and Synchro Monsters. During the next morning, the WRGP finals begin with Jack facing off against Lester, who both bring out their ace monsters, Red Nova Dragon and Machine Emperor Skiel Infinity. But then, Lester activates the continuous trap, Infinite Spirit Machine, which gains a Spirit Machine Counter for every 100 points of damage he takes. Jack manages to defeat Skiel and beat Lester, though he leaves behind some traps cards, and the strange continuous trap, Infinite Spirit Machine, for both Primo, and Jakob to use. But before Lester loses, he activates another continuous trap, Infinite Prison, which allows him to send a card in his hand to the Graveyard, to treat Sky Core as a spell card from the Graveyard, and set it face-down in the face-down zone.
132	40	"Dawn of the Machines / A Violent Assault!! Machine Emperor Wisel Infinity"; Transliteration: "Kyōshū!! Kikōtei Waizeru" (Japanese: 強襲！！ 機皇帝ワイゼル∞)	Yoshifumi Fukushima	October 20, 2010	August 20, 2011
The next round starts with Jack facing Primo, who immediately brings out Machine Emperor Wisel Infinity. Primo then manages to bring Jack's life points down to 1,100, through the use of his trap cards, one of which Lester had intended only for Jakob to use. Seeing that Primo was acting on his own again, when Primo activates 2 traps he left for Jakob, Lester get agitated, but when Jakob reminded Primo of their plan, Primo decided to try something different. Yusei realizes their tactic is based on the continuous trap that Lester left behind, but when Jack tries to destroy it, Primo protects it with a trap card, and gets beaten by Jack. But before he loses, Primo then activates another of Lester's continuous traps, Infinite Prison. By sending Wisel Attack 3 to the Graveyard, he can then treat Wise Core as a spell card from the Graveyard, and set it face-down in the face-down zone. Jack then faces Jakob, who brings out Machine Emperor Grannel Infinity, and uses a trap to destroy Infinite Spirit Machine, in order to give himself a total of 12,000 life points, which in turn becomes Grannel's attack points, due to Grannel's special ability. Then, Jakob has Machine Emperor Grannel Infinity destroy and absorb Red Nova Dragon from the Graveyard, which raises Grannel's attack points to 15,500, with the attack knocking Jack off a bridge.
133	41	"Against All Odds / The Looming Threat! Machine Emperor Grannel Infinity"; Transliteration: "Tachihadakaru Kyotei! Kikōtei Guran'eru" (Japanese: 立ちはだかる巨帝！ 機皇帝グランエル∞)	Kenichi Yamashita	October 27, 2010	August 27, 2011
Despite the others' concern for his safety, Crow goes to face Jakob. Crow attempts a technique to utilize his Synchro Monster's abilities without putting them at risk, by summoning Blackwing Aurora of the Northern Lights, and by activating its special ability, but Jakob counters Crow's strategy by using Red Nova Dragon as a shield, and by attacking him 2 times with Jack's dragon. Crow is then defeated by Jakob, but manages to summon Black-Winged Dragon in defense mode for Yusei to use, by playing a trap card, after being attacked by Machine Emperor Grannel Infinity. Crow then crashes, and Yusei goes out to face Jakob.
134	42	"For Synchro's Sake / The Road of Ruin! The Future Favored By Synchro Summoning"; Transliteration: "Hametsu no Michi! Shinkuro Shōkan ga Ikitsuku Mirai" (Japanese: 破滅の道！ シンクロ召喚が行きつく未来)	Yasuyuki Suzuki	November 10, 2010	September 3, 2011
Yusei begins his battle against Jakob, using Crow's trap to bring out Stardust Dragon when Black-Winged Dragon gets destroyed. Jakob then activates a trap, which brings out Grannel Attack 3, while reducing Yusei's life points to 2,800. Jakob shows Yusei and the others a twisted future where New Domino City is completely destroyed. Due to Synchro Monsters and Ener-D evolving the world at an incredible rate, a war broke out and the Ener-D reactor eventually exploded, destroying most of the world. The Yliaster trio also unveil their memories of despair. 200 into the future, they see everybody Synchro Summoning, and as a result of them using Synchro Monsters to achieve their own greedy desires, the Machine Emperors show up one day, and begin killing humans. In the vision, as Lester was running with his parents to safety, a Grannel shot his parents down. Lester in the vision, then wails at the death of his parents, the ones who loved him. Then, Primo reveals that he joined the Freedom Fighters, a group of military people who destroy Machine Emperors, to restore freedom to mankind. He also reveals that he fell in love with one of their number, Eurea Pastel, and they often fought together. When they ambush another Grannel, it retaliates, by shooting down the building, killing his girlfriend in the process. Primo then cries over her death, and when the Grannel comes to kill him, he angrily shoots it down. Jakob then reveals that he was the "last survivor" of the Machine Emperor attack. He then says that he tried for years to find other humans, but to no avail. In the future, Jakob then sheds some tears over the destruction of humankind. Back in the duel, although the Yliaster trio said that the events the Signers just saw were their memories of humanity's destruction, Yusei refuses to believe that any of it was true. Yusei then brings out Shooting Star Dragon, and manages to destroy Machine Emperor Grannel Infinity, which reduces Jakob's life points from 12,000 down to 3,900. Just then, Jakob activates the Yliaster trio's infinity patches, and then the sky glows red, and a huge green infinity symbol appears in the sky. Jakob, Primo, and Lester then get launched into the sky, towards the huge green infinity. Then, they fuse together to form the true Emperor of Yliaster, Aporia, who is the true form of the Yliaster trio, and then the green infinity disappears. As Yusei questions what is going on in disbelief, Aporia answers, "I am Aporia." (Lester is Aporia's childhood counterpart, Primo his late teenage one, and Jakob his form during his old age. "Aporia" is the mid-age adult counterpart, who appears at the peak of his life, formed only by the 3 other counterparts fusing.)
