= Young Blood (EP) =

EP by Bea Miller
- Released: April 22, 2014
- Recorded: 2013–2014
- Genre: Pop rock
- Length: 13:53
- Label: Syco; Hollywood

Bea Miller chronology
Young Blood (2014)	Not an Apology (2015)

Singles from Young Blood
- 1. "Young Blood" Released: June 30, 2014

Young Blood is the first extended play (EP) by the American singer Bea Miller. It was her first release after finishing ninth on the second season of The X Factor US, and was released on April 22, 2014, by Syco Music and Hollywood Records. The EP has contributions from producers and songwriters such as Phoebe Ryan, busbee and Jarrad Rogers.

== Singles ==
The EP's title track, "Young Blood", was released as Miller's first single on June 30, 2014. The music video was released on July 21, 2014, on Miller's Vevo channel.

The song "Fire n Gold" was released to contemporary hit radio on April 28, 2015, and was the lead single from her first album, Not an Apology.

== Commercial performance ==
Young Blood debuted and peaked at No. 64 on the Billboard 200.

== Track listing ==
No.	Title	Writer(s)	Length
1.	"Young Blood"	Bea Miller; Mike Del Rio; Matt Parad; Phoebe Ryan	3:39
2.	"Enemy Fire"	busbee; Meghan Kabir	3:51
3.	"Fire n Gold"	Nolan Sipe; Freddy Wexler; Jarrad Rogers	3:31
4.	"Dracula"	Miller; Skyler Stonestreet; Kara DioGuardi; CJ Baran	2:52

== Charts ==
Chart (2014)	Peak position
US Billboard 200	64

== Release history ==
Country	Date	Format	Label	Ref.
United States	April 22, 2014	Digital download	Syco; Hollywood	
