= Not an Apology =

Studio album by Bea Miller
- Released: July 24, 2015
- Recorded: 2013–2015
- Genre: Dance-rock; pop punk
- Length: 37:39
- Label: Syco; Hollywood
- Producer: Bea Miller; Mike Del Rio; Jarrad Rogers; Oh, Hush!; Sidney Samson; The Elev3n; busbee; Mitch Allan; Tommy Trash; A-Trak; CJ Baran; The Runners; Dada Life; Squire

Bea Miller chronology
Young Blood (2014)	Not an Apology (2015)	Chapter One: Blue (2017)

Bea Miller studio album chronology
Not an Apology (2015)	Aurora (2018)

Singles from Not an Apology
- 1. "Fire n Gold" Released: April 28, 2015; 2. "Force of Nature" Released: May 12, 2015

Professional ratings
Review scores
Source	Rating
AllMusic	positive
Headline Planet	positive
Radio	7/10 stars

Not an Apology is the debut studio album by American singer-songwriter Bea Miller. It was released on July 24, 2015, by Syco Music and Hollywood Records exclusively in United States and Canada. It includes all four tracks from her debut EP, Young Blood (2014).

== Background ==
In April 2013, Miller announced that she was signed to Syco Music and Hollywood Records, marking the first collaborative arrangement between the two labels. On March 17, 2015, the album's title was confirmed by Headline Planet to be Not an Apology along with a release date of July 24, 2015. It was only released in the United States and Canada.

== Commercial performance ==
Not an Apology debuted at No. 7 on the Billboard 200 with 33,000 units, of which 24,000 are pure album sales.

== Singles ==
"Young Blood" was released on April 22, 2015, along with Bea's debut EP, Young Blood. It had moderate success being used on American Idol and receiving praise from fans. It peaked on a few charts and barely failed to peak on the Billboard Hot 100. However, the song was received well from critics.

The second single released was "Fire n Gold" and is Bea's most successful single to date. The song had an outstanding success and was released to radios on April 28, 2015. The song has been used in Netflix commercials and has been praised by many fans and famous singers. The single became Bea's first single to chart on the Billboard Hot 100 at No. 78. The music video was released on May 14, 2015. The single has been certified Gold in the United States, with 500,000 copies sold.

== Track listing ==
No.	Title	Writer(s)	Producer(s)	Length
1.	"Young Blood"	Beatrice Miller; Mike Del Rio; Matt Parad; Phoebe Ryan	Del Rio	3:39
2.	"Fire n Gold"	Nolan Sipe; Freddy Wexler; Jarrad Rogers	Rogers	3:31
3.	"I Dare You"	Julia Michaels; Mitch Allan	Allan; Oh, Hush!	3:26
4.	"Paper Doll"	Miller; Matthew Morales; James G. Morales; Julio David Rodriguez; Autumn Rowe; Shane Stevens	The Elev3n	3:36
5.	"Perfect Picture"	Allan; Jason Evigan; Olivia Waithe	The Suspex	3:07
6.	"Enemy Fire"	Michael Ryan; Meghan "Shahnaz" Kabir	busbee	3:51
7.	"Force of Nature"	Ashley Gorley; Andrew Harr; Jermaine Jackson; Michaels; Alex Delicata	The Runners; Delicata	4:01
8.	"This Is Not an Apology"	Lucas Banker; Travis Huff; Matt Squire; Ali Tamposi	Squire; Steve Tippeconic	3:25
9.	"Dracula"	Miller; CJ Baran; Kara DioGuardi; Skyler Stonestreet	Baran	2:52
10.	"We're Taking Over"	Demi Lovato; Emanuel Kiriakou; Andrew Goldstein; Lindy Robbins	Goldstein; Kiriakou	3:27
11.	"Rich Kids"	Benji Madden; Joel Madden; Squire	Squire; Tippeconic	2:44
Total length:				37:39

== Charts ==
Chart (2015)	Peak position
US Billboard 200	7
US Digital Albums (Billboard)	5

== Release history ==
Region	Date	Format(s)	Label	Ref.
United States; Canada	July 24, 2015	CD; digital download	Syco	
