= List of Yu-Gi-Oh! 5D's episodes =

The following is a list of episodes for the anime series Yu-Gi-Oh! 5D's (遊戯王ファイブディーズ, Yūgiō Faibu Dīzu), which began airing in Japan on April 2, 2008. The series is currently licensed for release in North America by Konami. However, only 31 episodes from seasons 4 and 5 were dubbed into English by 4Kids Entertainment, due to low ratings, pressure to air Yu-Gi-Oh! Zexal, and an ongoing lawsuit from TV Tokyo and NAS.

== Series overview ==
Season	Episodes	Originally released	
Season	Episodes	First released	Last released
1	26	April 2, 2008	September 24, 2008
2	38	October 1, 2008	June 24, 2009
3	28	July 1, 2009	January 13, 2010
4	42	January 20, 2010	November 10, 2010
5	20	November 17, 2010	March 30, 2011

== Theme songs ==
=== Opening themes ===
Title	Vocalist	Episode #
BONDS -Kizuna-	Kra	1–26
LAST TRAIN -New Morning-	knotlamp	27–64
FREEDOM	La Vie	65–103
BELIEVE IN NEXUS	Masaaki Endoh	104–129
Road to Tomorrow - ~Going My Way!!~	Masaaki Endoh	130–154

Title	Vocalist	Episode #
Hyper Drive (Eng dub)	Cass Dillon	All Episodes

=== Ending themes ===
Title	Vocalist	Episode #
START	Masataka Nakagauchi	1–26
CROSS GAME	Alice Nine	27–64
-OZONE-	Vistlip	65–103
CLOSE TO YOU	ALvino ~Alchemy vision normal~	104–129
Future Colors	Plastic Tree	130–153

Title	Vocalist	Episode #
Hyper Drive (Eng dub) (short version)	Cass Dillon	All Episodes

=== Insert Songs ===
Title	Vocalist	Episode #
You Say - Towards Tomorrow - ( YOU SAY - 明日へ - )	La Vie	72, 90, 92
Clear Mind	Masaaki Endoh	109, 110, 122, 129, 134, 154
YAKUSOKU NO MELODY ("The Melody of Promises")	Masaaki Endoh	154

== Episode list ==
=== Season 1: Fortune Cup Duels (2008) ===
No. overall	No. in season	Title	Written by	Original release date	American air date
1	1	"On Your Mark, Get Set, Duel! / Riding Duel! Acceleration!"; Transliteration: "Raidingu Dyueru! Akuserarēshon!" (Japanese: ライディング·デュエル! アクセラレーション!)	Atsuhiro Tomioka	April 2, 2008	September 13, 2008
2	2	"Creepy Crawlies / Power Insect Deck! The Ant-Lion Trap!"; Transliteration: "Pawā Insekuto Dekki! Arijigoku no Wana" (Japanese: パワーインセクトデッキ! 蟻地獄の罠)	Atsuhiro Tomioka	April 9, 2008	September 20, 2008
3	3	"Pipe Dreams / Escape! Nitro Warrior vs. Goyo Guardian!"; Transliteration: "Dasshutsu! Nitoro Woriā Bāsasu Goyō Gādian" (Japanese: 脱出! ニトロ·ウォリアーVSゴヨウ·ガーディアン)	Atsuhiro Tomioka	April 16, 2008	September 27, 2008
4	4	"A Blast from the Past, Part 1 / The Battle of Destiny! Stardust Dragon Stands in the Way"; Transliteration: "Unmei no Taiketsu! Tachihadakaru Sutādasuto Doragon" (Japanese: 運命の対決! 立ちはだかるスターダスト·ドラゴン)	Atsuhiro Tomioka	April 23, 2008	October 4, 2008
5	5	"A Blast from the Past, Part 2 / Ace Dragons Clash! Stardust Dragon vs. Red Demons"; Transliteration: "Gekitotsu-suru Ēsu Doragon! Sutādasuto Bāsasu Reddo Dēmonzu" (Japanese: 激突するエース·ドラゴン! スターダストVSレッド·デーモンズ)	Atsuhiro Tomioka	April 30, 2008	October 11, 2008
6	6	"The Facility, Part 1 / Look at My Treasured Deck!"; Transliteration: "Mitekure! Washi no Hihō Dekki" (Japanese: 見てくれ! ワシの秘宝デッキ!)	Atsuhiro Tomioka	May 5, 2008	October 18, 2008
7	7	"The Facility, Part 2 / Feelings Towards the Cards! Crystal Skull vs. Giant Ushi Oni"; Transliteration: "Kādo ni Kometa Omoi! Suishō Dokuro Bāsasu Ō Ushioni" (Japanese: カードにこめた想い! 水晶ドクロVS大牛鬼)	Atsuhiro Tomioka	May 14, 2008	October 25, 2008
8	8	"Fire It Up! / Unfulfilled Soul: the Signers and the Legendary Dragon"; Transliteration: "Mitasarenu Tamashī Shigunā to Densetsu no Ryū" (Japanese: 満たされぬ魂 シグナーと伝説の竜)	Atsuhiro Tomioka	May 21, 2008	November 1, 2008
9	9	"The Lockdown Duel, Part 1 / Feelings Hanging for the Cards: A Planned Lightning Deathmatch"; Transliteration: "Kādo ni Kakeru Omoi Shikumareta Raitoningu Desumacchi" (Japanese: カードにかける思い 仕組まれたライトニング·デスマッチ)	Shin Yoshida	May 28, 2008	November 8, 2008
10	10	"The Lockdown Duel, Part 2 / Deck Zero: Break the Chain Trap Loop"; Transliteration: "Dekki Zero Chēn Torappu no Rūpu wo Yabure" (Japanese: デッキ0 チェーントラップのループを破れ)	Shin Yoshida	June 4, 2008	November 15, 2008
11	11	"The Take Back, Part 1 / The Special Pursuit Deck Returns: Regain the Bonds with a Friend"; Transliteration: "Tokushu Tsuiseki Dekki Futatabi Torimodose Nakama tono Kizuna" (Japanese: 特殊追跡デッキ再び 取り戻せ仲間との絆)	Yasuyuki Suzuki	June 11, 2008	November 22, 2008
12	12	"The Take Back, Part 2 / Dead Chase! Weave the Bonds, Turbo Warrior"; Transliteration: "Deddo Cheisu! Kizuna wo Tsumuge Tābo Woriā" (Japanese: 死闘追跡! 絆を紡げ ターボ・ウォリアー)	Yasuyuki Suzuki	June 18, 2008	November 29, 2008
13	13	"A Duel to Remember / Dial On! Roar Morphtronic Deck"; Transliteration: "Daiyaru On! Unare Difōmā Dekki" (Japanese: ダイヤル·オン! うなれディフォーマーデッキ)	Atsuhiro Tomioka	June 25, 2008	December 6, 2008
14	14	"Bloom of the Black Rose / The Bringer of Folklore Destruction Appears, "The Black Rose""; Transliteration: "Arawareru Fōkuroa Hakai o Motarasu "Kurobara no Majo"" (Japanese: 現れるフォークロア破壊をもたらす 「黒薔薇の魔女」)	Atsuhiro Tomioka	July 2, 2008	December 13, 2008
15	15	"Welcome to the Fortune Cup / The Duel of Fortune Cup Begins: Attack from the Sky!! Giant Bomber Air Raid"; Transliteration: "Dyueru Obu Fōchūn Kappu Kaimaku Daikūshū!! Jaianto Bomā Eareido" (Japanese: デュエル·オブ·フォーチューンカップ開幕 大空襲!!ジャイアントボマー·エアレ イド)	Atsuhiro Tomioka	July 9, 2008	December 20, 2008
16	16	"Battle with The Black Rose / Reunion with The Witch: The Dragon of Destruction, "Black Rose Dragon""; Transliteration: "Majosairai, Hametsu no Ryū "Burakku Rōzu Doragon"" (Japanese: 魔女再来, 破滅の竜 ｢ブラック・ローズ・ドラゴン｣)	Shuichi Koyama	July 16, 2008	December 27, 2008
17	17	"Surprise, Surprise / Flame Revenger: Speed King Skull Flame"; Transliteration: "Honō no Ribenjā Supīdokingu ☆ Sukaru Fureimu" (Japanese: 炎のリベンジャー スピード・キング☆スカル・フレイム)	Yoshifumi Fukushima	July 23, 2008	January 3, 2009
18	18	"Return to the Spirit World, Part 1 / The Ancient Forest: Invitation to the Spirits' World"; Transliteration: "Inishie no Mori Seirei Sekai eno Izanai" (Japanese: 古の森 精霊世界への誘い)	Yasuyuki Suzuki	July 30, 2008	January 10, 2009
19	19	"Return to the Spirit World, Part 2 / The Contaminated Spirit World: Evil Intent, Ido the Supreme Magical God"; Transliteration: "Osensareru Seirei Sekai Akunaru Ishi Chōmajin Ido" (Japanese: 汚染される精霊世界 悪なる意思 超魔神イド)	Yasuyuki Suzuki	August 6, 2008	January 17, 2009
20	20	"Second Round Showdown, Part 1 / Unweavering Feelings: My Mission is For My Hometown and My Friends"; Transliteration: "Yuzurenai Omoi Waga Shimei wa Kokyō to Tomo ni" (Japanese: 譲れない想い 我が使命は故郷と共に)	Shin Yoshida	August 13, 2008	January 24, 2009
21	21	"Second Round Showdown, Part 2 / Greiger's Revenge: The Trap of Sorrow, Chariot Pile"; Transliteration: "Fukushū no Bomā Kanashimi no Torappu Chariotto Pairu" (Japanese: 復讐のボマー 悲しみのトラップ チャリオット·パイル)	Shin Yoshida	August 20, 2008	January 31, 2009
22	22	"The Profiler / The Past Revealed: The Duel Profiler vs. The Black Rose Witch"; Transliteration: "Abakareru Kako Dyueru Purofairā Bāsasu Kurobara no Majo" (Japanese: 暴かれる過去 デュエルプロファイラ-VS黒薔薇の魔女)	Atsuhiro Tomioka	August 27, 2008	February 7, 2009
23	23	"Duel of the Dragons, Part 1 / The Final Match: The Soul Hidden Behind the Mask"; Transliteration: "Fainaru Macchi, Kamen no Oku ni Kakusareta Kokoro" (Japanese: 決勝戦, 仮面の奥に隠された心)	Yasuyuki Suzuki	September 3, 2008	February 14, 2009
24	24	"Duel of the Dragons, Part 2 / Victim's Sanctuary: Become the Star that Envelops Destruction! Stardust Dragon"; Transliteration: "Vikutemu Sankuchuari Hakai wo Tsutsumu Hoshi to Nare! Sutādasuto Doragon" (Japanese: ヴィクテム·サンクチュアリ 破壊を包む星となれ! スターダスト·ドラゴン)	Yasuyuki Suzuki	September 10, 2008	February 21, 2009
25	25	"The Fortune Cup Finale, Part 1 / The Fortune Cup Finals! The Lonely King, Jack Atlas"; Transliteration: "Fōchun Kappu Fainaru! Kokō no Kingu Jakku Atorasu" (Japanese: フォーチュンカップ ファイナル! 孤高のキング ジャック·アトラス)	Shin Yoshida	September 17, 2008	February 28, 2009
26	26	"The Fortune Cup Finale, Part 2 / Destiny of the Signers! The Future Guided by the Crimson Dragon!"; Transliteration: "Shigunā-tachi no Unmei! Akaki Ryū ga Michibiku Mirai" (Japanese: シグナーたちの運命! 赤き竜が導く未来!)	Shin Yoshida	September 24, 2008	March 7, 2009

=== Season 2: Earthbound Immortals (2008–09) ===
No. overall	No. in season	Title	Written by	Original release date	American air date
27	1	"A Web of Deceit, Part 1 / A World Without Light: Dark Synchro, Frozen Fitzgerald!"; Transliteration: "Hikarinaki Sekai Dāku Shinkuro Hyōketsu no Fittsujerarudo!" (Japanese: 光なき世界 ダークシンクロ 氷結のフィッツジェラルド!)	Yasuyuki Suzuki	October 1, 2008	May 16, 2009
28	2	"A Web of Deceit, Part 2 / The Darkness That Engulfs All: The Immortal Shadow Signer"; Transliteration: "Subete wo Nomikomu Yami Fumetsu no Dāku Shigunā" (Japanese: すべてを呑み込む闇 不滅のダークシグナー)	Koji Ueda	October 8, 2008	May 23, 2009
29	3	"Good Cop, Bad Cop / A New Threat: Dark Signer Ushio??!"; Transliteration: "Samarikuru Kyōi Dāku Shigunā Ushio!?" (Japanese: 迫りくる脅威 ダークシグナー牛尾?!?)	Yasuyuki Suzuki	October 15, 2008	May 30, 2009
30	4	"Fight or Flight / My Name is Crow! Fly, Black Bird"; Transliteration: "Wagana wa Kurō! Tobe Burakku Bādo" (Japanese: わが名はクロウ! 飛べブラック·バード)	Shin Yoshida	October 22, 2008	June 6, 2009
31	5	"The Reunion Duel / Hometown and Friends: The Reuniting Tag Riding"; Transliteration: "Kokyō to Nakama Saikai no Taggu Raidingu" (Japanese: 故郷と仲間 再会のタッグライディング)	Koji Ueda	October 29, 2008	June 13, 2009
32	6	"Dark Signs, Part 1 / The Symbol of Freedom, The Daedalus Bridge"; Transliteration: "Jiyū no Shōchō Daidarosu Buriji" (Japanese: 自由の象徴 ダイダロスブリッジ)	Masahiro Hikokubo	November 5, 2008	June 20, 2009
33	7	"Dark Signs, Part 2 / Vengeful Inferno: My Former Friend, Kiryu Kyosuke"; Transliteration: "Fukushū no Gōka! Katsute no Tomo Kiryū Kyōsuke" (Japanese: 復讐の刧火! かっての友 鬼柳京介)	Yasuyuki Suzuki	November 12, 2008	June 27, 2009
34	8	"Dark Signs, Part 3 / Dark Synchro! Come Forth, Hundred Eyes Dragon"; Transliteration: "Dāku Shinkuro! Ideyo Wan Handoreddo Ai Doragon" (Japanese: ダークシンクロ! いでよワンハンドレッド·アイ·ドラゴン)	Yasuyuki Suzuki	November 19, 2008	July 4, 2009
35	9	"Dark Signs, Part 4 / Terrifying! Earthbound Immortal Ccapac Apu"; Transliteration: "Senritsu! Jibakushin Kokapaku Apu" (Japanese: 戦慄! 地縛神コカパク·アプ)	Koji Ueda	November 26, 2008	July 11, 2009
36	10	"Supersensory Shakedown / Docking of Courage and Power! Synchro Summon, Power Tool Dragon"; Transliteration: "Yūki to Chikara wo Dokkingu! Shinkuro Shōkan! Pawā Tsūru Doragon" (Japanese: 勇気と力をドッキング! シンクロ召喚! パワー·ツール·ドラゴン)	Shin Yoshida	December 3, 2008	July 27, 2009 (Online); August 11, 2009 (TV)
37	11	"Digging Deeper, Part 1 / Infiltration! Arcadia Movement, Therefore it's My Turn!"; Transliteration: "Sennyū! Arukadia Mūbumento Watashi no Tān Nandakara!" (Japanese: 潜入! アルカディアムーブメント 私のターンなんだから!)	Shin Yoshida	December 10, 2008	July 27, 2009 (Online); August 12, 2009 (TV)
38	12	"Digging Deeper, Part 2 / Resurrected Soul: The New Geoglyph Ablaze"; Transliteration: "Yomigaerishi Tamashī Moesakaru Aratana Jiogurifu" (Japanese: 蘇りし魂 燃えさかる新たなジオグリフ)	Shin Yoshida	December 17, 2008	July 27, 2009 (Online); August 13, 2009 (TV)
39	13	"Digging Deeper, Part 3 / Descend! Two Earthbound Immortals"; Transliteration: "Kōrin! Nitai no Jibakushin" (Japanese: 降臨！2体の地縛神)	Shin Yoshida	December 24, 2008	July 27, 2009 (Online); August 14, 2009 (TV)
40	14	"Clash of the Dragons, Part 1 / Irreversible Past : A Locked Heart's Door"; Transliteration: "Modorenai Kako Tozasareta Kokoro no Tobira" (Japanese: 戻れない過去 閉ざされた心の扉)	Yasuyuki Suzuki	January 7, 2009	July 30, 2009 (Online); August 17, 2009 (TV)
41	15	"Clash of the Dragons, Part 2 / Hatred Caused by Sorrow! Catch it, Stardust Dragon"; Transliteration: "Kanashimi Yue no Zō-o! Uketomero Sutādasuto Doragon" (Japanese: 悲しみ故の憎悪! 受け止めろスターダスト·ドラゴン)	Yasuyuki Suzuki	January 14, 2009	July 30, 2009 (Online); August 18, 2009 (TV)
42	16	"The Signs of Time / Gather! Warriors of the Crimson Dragon"; Transliteration: "Shūketsu! Akaki Ryū no Senshi-tachi" (Japanese: 集結! 赤き竜の戦士たち)	Koji Ueda	January 21, 2009	July 18, 2009
43	17	"Surely, You Jest, Part 1 / Respective Determination! That Which is Wholeheartedly Believable"; Transliteration: "Sorezore no Ketsui Kokoro kara Shinjirareru Mono" (Japanese: それぞれの決意! 心から信じられるもの)	Koji Ueda	January 28, 2009	July 25, 2009
44	18	"Surely, You Jest, Part 2 / Stir up the Divine Winds! Blackwing Armed Wing"; Transliteration: "Kamikaze wo Makiokose! Burakku Fezā Āmuzu Wingu" (Japanese: 神風を巻き起こせ! ブラックフェザー·アームズ·ウィング)	Koji Ueda	February 4, 2009	August 1, 2009
45	19	"Mark of the Spider, Part 1 / Confrontation! The Man with the Mark of the Spider!"; Transliteration: "Taiketsu! Kumo no Aza wo Motsu Otoko" (Japanese: 対決! 蜘蛛の痣をもつ男)	Yasuyuki Suzuki	February 11, 2009	August 8, 2009
46	20	"Mark of the Spider, Part 2 / The Truth from Seventeen Years Ago, The Hidden Trap of the Dark Signers"; Transliteration: "Jūnananen Mae no Shinjitsu Kakusareta Dāku Shigunā no Wana" (Japanese: 17年前の真実 隠されたダークシグナーの罠)	Yasuyuki Suzuki	February 18, 2009	August 15, 2009
47	21	"Mark of the Monkey, Part 1 / The Man with the Mark of the Monkey"; Transliteration: "Saru no Chijōe no Aza wo Motsu Otoko" (Japanese: 猿の地上絵の痣を持つ男)	Shin Yoshida	February 25, 2009	August 22, 2009
48	22	"Mark of the Monkey, Part 2 / Minus World, Search for the White Lion Regulus"; Transliteration: "Mainasu Wārudo Shiroki Shishi Regurusu wo Sagase" (Japanese: マイナスワールド 白き獅子レグルスを探せ)	Koji Ueda	March 4, 2009	August 26, 2009
49	23	"Mark of the Monkey, Part 3 / The King That Rules Over Minus, Demonic Monkey King Zeman"; Transliteration: "Mainasu wo Tsukasadoru Ō Enmaō Zēman" (Japanese: マイナスをつかさどる王 猿魔王ゼーマン)	Koji Ueda	March 11, 2009	August 27, 2009
50	24	"Mark of the Monkey, Part 4 / Curse of Minus Spell! The Imprisoned Ancient Fairy Dragon"; Transliteration: "Mainasu no Noroi! Torawareta Enshento Fearī Doragon" (Japanese: マイナスの呪い! 捕らわれたエンシェント·フェアリードラゴン)	Koji Ueda	March 18, 2009	August 27, 2009
51	25	"A Whale of a Ride, Part 1 / Be Resurrected! The Boundary Surpassing Riding Duel"; Transliteration: "Tenseiseyo! Genkai Toppa no Raidingu Dyueru" (Japanese: 転生せよ! 限界突破のライディング·デュエル)	Shin Yoshida	March 25, 2009	August 28, 2009
52	26	"A Whale of a Ride, Part 2 / At the Ends of the Emotions Spun by the Cards"; Transliteration: "Kādo ga Tsumugu Omoi no Hate ni" (Japanese: カードが紡ぐ想いの果てに)	Shin Yoshida	April 1, 2009	August 28, 2009
53	27	"A Whale of a Ride, Part 3 / Gust Fiercely, Winds: Lone Silver Wind of the Black Feathers"; Transliteration: "Fukisusabe Arashi Burakku Fezā Kokō no Shirubā Windo" (Japanese: 吹きすさべ嵐 ブラックフェザー孤高のシルバー·ウィンド)	Shin Yoshida	April 8, 2009	December 22, 2009 (Online); March 2, 2010 (TV)
54	28	"A Score to Settle, Part 1 / Last Duel! Team Satisfaction"; Transliteration: "Rasto Dyueru! Chīmu Satisufakushon" (Japanese: ラストデュエル! チームサティスファクション)	Yasuyuki Suzuki	April 15, 2009	December 22, 2009 (Online); March 4, 2010 (TV)
55	29	"A Score to Settle, Part 2 / Companions' Sincerity, Majestic Dragon - Savior Dragon"; Transliteration: "Nakama-tachi no Omoi, Kyūseiryū Seivā Doragon" (Japanese: 仲間達の想い, 救世竜セイヴァー·ドラゴン)	Yasuyuki Suzuki	April 22, 2009	January 12, 2010 (Online); March 5, 2010 (TV)
56	30	"Destiny's Will, Part 1 / The 17-Year Old Vow: The Destiny Guided by Momentum"; Transliteration: "Jūnananenmae no Chikai Mōmento ga Michibiku Unmei" (Japanese: 17年前の誓い モーメントが導く運命)	Shin Yoshida	April 29, 2009	January 12, 2010 (Online); March 8, 2010 (TV)
57	31	"Destiny's Will, Part 2 / Darkness of the Heart, the Last Hope Remaining"; Transliteration: "Kokoro no Yami Nokosareta Saigo no Kibō" (Japanese: 心の闇 残された最後の希望)	Shin Yoshida	May 6, 2009	January 12, 2010 (Online); March 9, 2010 (TV)
58	32	"Shadows of Doubt, Part 1 / Ahead Is My Destiny! The High Ruler of Hell, The Dark King"; Transliteration: "Sono Saki ni Aru Unmei! Jigoku no Hasha Dāku Kingu" (Japanese: その先にある運命! 地獄の覇者ダークキング)	Koji Ueda	May 13, 2009	February 22, 2010 (Online); March 10, 2010 (TV)
59	33	"Shadows of Doubt, Part 2 / The Lone Light, Savior Demon Dragon"; Transliteration: "Kokō no Hikari Seivā Demon Doragon" (Japanese: 孤高の光 セイヴァー·デモン·ドラゴン)	Koji Ueda	May 20, 2009	February 22, 2010 (Online); March 11, 2010 (TV)
60	34	"Truth and Consequences, Part 1 / Sad Story - Sorrowful Memories"; Transliteration: "Saddo Sutōrī Kanashimi no Kioku" (Japanese: サッド·ストーリー〜悲しみの記憶〜)	Tadashi Hayakawa	May 27, 2009	February 22, 2010 (Online); March 12, 2010 (TV)
61	35	"Truth and Consequences, Part 2 / At the End of the Truth"; Transliteration: "Shinjitsu no Hate ni" (Japanese: 真実の果てに)	Tadashi Hayakawa	June 3, 2009	March 15, 2010
62	36	"Signs of Doom, Part 1 / Last Battle! The Man with Two Marks"; Transliteration: "Saigo no Tatakai! Futatsu no Kami wo Motsu Otoko" (Japanese: 最後の戦い! 2つの神をもつ男)	Yasuyuki Suzuki	June 10, 2009	March 16, 2010
63	37	"Signs of Doom, Part 2 / The Strongest Earthbound Immortal! Wiraqocha Rasca!"; Transliteration: "Saikyō no Jibakushin! Wirakocharasuka" (Japanese: 最強の地縛神! ウィラコチャラスカ!)	Yasuyuki Suzuki	June 17, 2009	March 17, 2010
64	38	"Signs of Doom, Part 3 / Towards Our Future!"; Transliteration: "Oretachi no Mirai e!" (Japanese: オレたちの未来へ!)	Yasuyuki Suzuki	June 24, 2009	March 18, 2010

=== Season 3: Road to Destiny (2009–10) ===
No. overall	No. in season	Title	Written by	Original release date	American air date
65	1	"A New Threat, Part 1 / A New Threat"; Transliteration: "Aratanaru Kyōi" (Japanese: 新たなる脅威)	Shin Yoshida	July 1, 2009	September 18, 2010
66	2	"A New Threat, Part 2 / The Symbol of Evolution - Synchro Monsters"; Transliteration: "Shinka no Akashi Shinkuro Monsutā" (Japanese: 進化の証 シンクロモンスター)	Shin Yoshida	July 8, 2009	September 25, 2010
67	3	"Lessons Learned / Traditions of the Duel Academy! Ancient Gear Golem"; Transliteration: "Dyueru Akademia no Dentō! Antīku Giagōremu" (Japanese: デュエルアカデミアの伝統！アンティーク・ギアゴーレム)	Koji Ueda	July 15, 2009	September 25, 2010
68	4	"Trash Talk / The Memories of the Elderly! The Scrap-Iron Family Deck"; Transliteration: "Rōjin no Kioku Kuzutetsu Famirī Dekki" (Japanese: 老人の記憶！くず鉄ファミリーデッキ)	Tadashi Hayakawa	July 22, 2009	October 2, 2010
69	5	"A Duel With Interest / A Threat! Lone Token Hell"; Transliteration: "Kyōi! Rōn Tōkun Jigoku" (Japanese: 脅威！ローントークン地獄)	Yoshifumi Fukushima	July 29, 2009	October 2, 2010
70	6	"The Wicked Spirit / The Forest that Spirits Away - Sleepy Beauty"; Transliteration: "Kamikakushi no Mori Surīpī Byūtī" (Japanese: 神隠しの森 スリーピービューティ)	Koji Ueda	August 5, 2009	October 9, 2010
71	7	"French Twist, Part 1 / Yusei Captured"; Transliteration: "Torawareta Yusei" (Japanese: 捕われた遊星)	Yasuyuki Suzuki	August 12, 2009	October 9, 2010
72	8	"French Twist, Part 2 / What Lies Within the Wind"; Transliteration: "Kaze no Naka ni Arumono" (Japanese: 風の中にあるもの)	Yasuyuki Suzuki	August 19, 2009	October 16, 2010
73	9	"Synchro Straits / After Sealing Synchro Summoning..."; Transliteration: "Shinkuro Shōkan wo Fūjita Saki ni..." (Japanese: シンクロ召喚を封じた先に…)	Yoshifumi Fukushima	August 26, 2009	October 16, 2010
74	10	"Synchro Solution / Further Evolution! Accel Synchro"; Transliteration: "Saranaru Shinka! Akuseru Shinkuro" (Japanese: さらなる進化！アクセルシンクロ)	Yoshifumi Fukushima	September 2, 2009	October 23, 2010
75	11	"Acceleration / Aki Izayoi Acceleration!"; Transliteration: "Izayoi Aki Akuserarēshon!" (Japanese: 十六夜アキ アクセラレーション！)	Tadashi Hayakawa	September 9, 2009	October 23, 2010
76	12	"Syd Is Vicious / Proud Demon Chaos King"; Transliteration: "Hokoritakaki Dēmon Kaosu Kingu" (Japanese: 誇り高き デーモン・カオス・キング)	Koji Ueda	September 16, 2009	October 30, 2010
77	13	"Dawn of the Duel Board, Part 1 / He Enters! The Super Elite Transfer Student"; Transliteration: "Tōjō! Sūpā Erīto Tenkōsei" (Japanese: 登場！スーパーエリート転校生)	Yoshifumi Fukushima	September 23, 2009	October 30, 2010
78	14	"Dawn of the Duel Board, Part 2 / A Nightmare Reborn! Machine Emperor Skiel Infinity"; Transliteration: "Yomigaeru Akumu! Kikōtei Sukieru" (Japanese: 甦る悪夢！機皇帝スキエル∞)	Yoshifumi Fukushima	September 30, 2009	November 6, 2010
79	15	"Putting It All Together / To a World Yet Unseen"; Transliteration: "Madaminu Sekai e" (Japanese: まだ見ぬ世界へ)	Shin Yoshida	October 7, 2009	November 6, 2010
80	16	"The Super Genius / The Mysterious Super Mechanic"; Transliteration: "Nazo no Sūpā Mekanikku" (Japanese: 謎のスーパーメカニック)	Shin Yoshida	October 14, 2009	November 13, 2010
81	17	"Get With the Program, Part 1 / Operation Capture Jaeger"; Transliteration: "Iēgā Hokaku Sakusen" (Japanese: イェーガー捕獲作戦!)	Kenichi Yamashita	October 21, 2009	November 13, 2010
82	18	"Get With the Program, Part 2 / Yusei Fudo, 100% Chance of Defeat!"; Transliteration: "Fudō Yūsei Haiboku Kakuritsu Wan Handoreddo Pāsento!" (Japanese: 不動遊星 敗北確率100%！)	Shin Yoshida	October 28, 2009	November 20, 2010
83	19	"Will the Real Jack Atlas, Please Stand Up, Part 1 / Imposter!? Jack Atlas"; Transliteration: "Yōgisha!? Jakku Atorasu" (Japanese: 容疑者！？ジャック・アトラス)	Koji Ueda	November 4, 2009	November 20, 2010
84	20	"Will the Real Jack Atlas, Please Stand Up, Part 2 / Another Jack"; Transliteration: "Mō Hitori no Jakku" (Japanese: もう一人のジャック)	Koji Ueda	November 11, 2009	November 27, 2010
85	21	"Mother Knows Best / The Grandfather Clock, Poppo Time"; Transliteration: "Poppo Taimu no Furudokei" (Japanese: ポッポタイムの古時計)	Tadashi Hayakawa	November 18, 2009	November 27, 2010 (Hulu); February 5, 2011 (TV)
86	22	"Duelist for Hire / Crash Town"; Transliteration: "Kurasshu Taun" (Japanese: クラッシュタウン)	Yasuyuki Suzuki	November 25, 2009	November 27, 2010
87	23	"Showdown at Sundown, Part 1 / Rescue Kiryu! The Town of Wandering Duelists"; Transliteration: "Kiryū Kyūshutsu! Samayoeru Dyuerisuto no Machi" (Japanese: 鬼柳救出！さまよえる決闘者の街)	Yasuyuki Suzuki	December 2, 2009	December 4, 2010
88	24	"Showdown at Sundown, Part 2 / The Trap Laid in Front of Victory"; Transliteration: "Kiryū Kyūshutsu! Samayoeru Dyuerisuto no Machi" (Japanese: 勝利の先にある罠)	Yasuyuki Suzuki	December 9, 2009	December 4, 2010
89	25	"The Race to Escape, Part 1 / Terror of Gatling Ogre"; Transliteration: "Gatoringu Ōga no Kyōfu" (Japanese: ガトリング・オーガの恐怖)	Yasuyuki Suzuki	December 16, 2009	December 11, 2010
90	26	"The Race to Escape, Part 2 / Death Match Riding Duel"; Transliteration: "Shitō no Raidingu Dyueru" (Japanese: 死闘のライディングデュエル)	Yasuyuki Suzuki	December 23, 2009	December 11, 2010
91	27	"Clash at Crash Town, Part 1 / Tag Duel: Kiryu & Yusei VS Lawton"; Transliteration: "Taggu Dyueru Kiryu to Yusei Bāsasu Rotten" (Japanese: タッグデュエル 鬼柳・遊星 VS ロットン)	Yasuyuki Suzuki	January 6, 2010	December 18, 2010
92	28	"Clash at Crash Town, Part 2 / Satisfaction Town"; Transliteration: "Satisufakushon" (Japanese: サティスファクションウン)	Yasuyuki Suzuki	January 13, 2010	December 18, 2010

=== Season 4: World Racing Grand Prix (2010) ===
No. overall	No. in season	Title	Written by	Original release date	American air date
93	1	"The Question of the Card / Tremble in Fear! The Resolve of the Master and Servant!!"; Transliteration: "Senritsu! Shujū no Kakugo!!" (Japanese: 戦慄！ 主従の覚悟!!)	Kenichi Yamashita	January 20, 2010	February 19, 2011
94	2	"Keeping a Promise, Part 1 / Recollections: Entrusted with a Friend's Dying Wish"; Transliteration: "Tsuioku Hōyū ga Takushita Ishi" (Japanese: 追憶 朋友が託した遺志)	Yoshifumi Fukushima	January 27, 2010	February 26, 2011
95	3	"Keeping a Promise, Part 2 / Soar! Black-Winged Dragon!!"; Transliteration: "Maiagare! Burakkufezā Doragon!!" (Japanese: 舞い上がれ！ ブラックフェザー・ドラゴン!!)	Yoshifumi Fukushima	February 3, 2010	March 5, 2011
96	4	"Natural Instincts, Part 1 / Rally Forth! Team 5D's"; Transliteration: "Kessei! Chīmu Faibudīzu" (Japanese: 結成！ チーム5D's)	Shin Yoshida	February 10, 2010	March 12, 2011
97	5	"Natural Instincts, Part 2 / After Despair and Conflict..."; Transliteration: "Zetsubō to Kattō no Saki ni..." (Japanese: 絶望と葛藤の先に...)	Koji Ueda	February 17, 2010	March 19, 2011
98	6	"Power Plays / The WRGP Commences! Team 5D's VS Team Unicorn"; Transliteration: "Daburuyūārujīpī Kaisai Chīmu Faibudīzu Bāsasu Chīmu Yunikōn" (Japanese: WRGP開幕！ チーム5D's VS チームユニコーン)	Shin Yoshida	February 24, 2010	March 26, 2011
99	7	"Trouble For Team 5D's / Burn! Phoenixian Cluster Amaryllis"; Transliteration: "Moero! Fenikishian Kurasutā Amaririsu" (Japanese: 燃えろ！ フェニキシアン・クラスター・アマリリス)	Shin Yoshida	March 3, 2010	April 2, 2011
100	8	"The Edge of Elimination, Part 1 / Dilemma! The Last Turbo Duelist, Yusei"; Transliteration: "Kyūchi Rasuto Hoīrā Yūsei" (Japanese: 窮！ 地ラスト・ホイーラー遊星)	Koji Ueda	March 10, 2010	April 9, 2011
101	9	"The Edge of Elimination, Part 2 / For The Team"; Transliteration: "Foa Za Chīmu" (Japanese: フォア・ザ・チーム)	Toshifumi Kawase	March 17, 2010	April 16, 2011
102	10	"The Edge of Elimination, Part 3 / Just For Victory"; Transliteration: "Tada Shōri no Tame ni" (Japanese: ただ勝利の為に)	Kenichi Yamashita	March 24, 2010	April 23, 2011
103	11	"Party Crashers / The Spoils of Battle"; Transliteration: "Tatakai no Hate ni Etamono" (Japanese: 戦いの果てに得たもの)	Shin Yoshida	March 31, 2010	April 30, 2011
104	12	"Knight Takes Pawn / Messengers of Destruction, Team Catastrophe"; Transliteration: "Hametsu no Shisha Chīmu Katasutorofu" (Japanese: 破滅の使者 チームカタストロフ)	Yoshifumi Fukushima	April 7, 2010	May 7, 2011
105	13	"Rook Takes Knight / The Card of Darkness - Hidden Knight Hook"; Transliteration: "Yami no Kādo Hidun Naito -Hukku-" (Japanese: 闇のカード ヒドゥン・ナイト －フック－)	Yoshifumi Fukushima	April 14, 2010	May 14, 2011
106	14	"Primo's Plan, Part 1 / Ghost Flood! The Terrifying Battle Royale Mode"; Transliteration: "Gōsuto Hanran! Kyōfu no Batoru Roiyaru Mōdo" (Japanese: ゴースト氾濫！ 恐怖のバトル・ロイヤル・モード)	Shin Yoshida	April 21, 2010	May 21, 2011
107	15	"Primo's Plan, Part 2 / Wake Up!! Unwavering Standpoint - Clear Mind"; Transliteration: "Kakusei!! Yuruganaki Kyōchi Kuria Maindo" (Japanese: 覚醒!! 揺るがなき境地 クリア・マインド)	Shin Yoshida	April 28, 2010	May 28, 2011
108	16	"Primo's Plan, Part 3 / The Revived Terror - Machine Emperor Wisel Infinity"; Transliteration: "Yomigaeru Kyōfu Kikōtei Waizeru" (Japanese: 蘇る恐怖 機皇帝ワイゼル∞)	Koji Ueda	May 5, 2010	June 4, 2011
109	17	"Primo's Plan, Part 4 / Accel Synchro! Be Born, Shooting Star Dragon!"; Transliteration: "Akuseru Shinkuro! Shōraiseyo! Shūtingu Sutā Doragon!" (Japanese: アクセル・シンクロ！ 生来せよ シューティング・スター・ドラゴン！)	Koji Ueda	May 12, 2010	June 11, 2011
110	18	"Primo's Plan, Part 5 / The Three Emperors of Yliaster"; Transliteration: "Iriasuteru no Sankōtei" (Japanese: イリアステルの三皇帝)	Shin Yoshida	May 19, 2010	June 18, 2011
111	19	"The Ancient Land - To Nazca!"; Transliteration: "Inishie no Chi Nasuka e" (Japanese: 古の地 ナスカヘ！)	Yasuyuki Suzuki	May 26, 2010	N/A
112	20	"The Crimson Devil"; Transliteration: "Guren no Akuma" (Japanese: 紅蓮の悪魔)	Yasuyuki Suzuki	June 2, 2010	N/A
113	21	"Blazing Soul! Scar-Red Nova Dragon"; Transliteration: "Moe Tagiru Tamashī! Sukāreddo Nova Doragon" (Japanese: 燃え滾る魂！ スカーレッド・ノヴァ・ドラゴン)	Yasuyuki Suzuki	June 9, 2010	N/A
114	22	"Operation Capture Lazar II"; Transliteration: "Yēgā Hokaku Sakusen Tsū" (Japanese: イェーガー捕獲作戦II)	Toshifumi Kawase	June 16, 2010	N/A
115	23	"Press Him About The Mystery!! The Endgame Turbo Duel!"; Transliteration: "Nazo ni Semare! Tsume Raidingu Dyueru!!" (Japanese: ライディングデュエル!! 謎に迫れ！)	Kenichi Yamashita	June 23, 2010	N/A
116	24	"The Ener-D Express Development Agency"; Transliteration: "Mōmento Ekusupuresu Kaihatsu Kikō" (Japanese: モーメント・エクスプレス開発機構)	Shin Yoshida	June 30, 2010	N/A
117	25	"The Distorted Past"; Transliteration: "Yugamerareta Kako" (Japanese: 歪められた過去)	Shin Yoshida	July 7, 2010	N/A
118	26	"The New Rivals"; Transliteration: "Aratanaru Raibaru" (Japanese: 新たなるライバル)	Yoshifumi Fukushima	July 14, 2010	N/A
119	27	"The Invincible Scrum! Smash The Unbreakable Defense!"; Transliteration: "Teppeki no Sukuramu! Kyōkō Shubi wo Uchikudake!" (Japanese: 鉄壁のスクラム！ 強硬守備を打ち砕け！)	Yoshifumi Fukushima	July 21, 2010	N/A
120	28	"Tie Those Feelings! The Hand Tied to the Majin!"; Transliteration: "Omoi wo Tsunage! Te wo Tsunagu Majin" (Japanese: 想いをつなげ！ 手をつなぐ魔人！)	Toshifumi Kawase	July 28, 2010	N/A
121	29	"The Miraculous Trump Card - Zushin the Sleeping Giant!"; Transliteration: "Kiseki no Kirifuda Nemureru Kyojin Zushin!" (Japanese: 奇跡の切り札 眠れる巨人ズシン！)	Shin Yoshida	August 4, 2010	N/A
122	30	"Believe in the Power! The Strongest Giant Zushin VS Shooting Star Dragon"; Transliteration: "Shinjiru Chikara! Saikyō no Kyojin Zushin Bāsasu Shūtingu Sutā Doragon" (Japanese: 信じる力！ 最強の巨人ズシン VS シューティング・スター・ドラゴン)	Kenichi Yamashita	August 11, 2010	N/A
123	31	"Eyes on the Prize / The Duelists with the Rune Eyes"; Transliteration: "Rūn no Hitomi no Dyuerisuto" (Japanese: ルーンの瞳のデュエリスト)	Toshifumi Kawase	August 18, 2010	June 25, 2011
124	32	"Duel for Redemption / Damaged Pride"; Transliteration: "Kizutsukerareta Puraido" (Japanese: 傷つけられたプライド)	Yoshifumi Fukushima	August 25, 2010	July 2, 2011
125	33	"Soul Solutions / Fighting Souls! Thor, Lord of the Aesir VS Red Nova Dragon"; Transliteration: "Tamashī no Tatakai! Kyokushin'ō Tōru Vāsasu Sukāreddo Nova Doragon" (Japanese: 魂の戦い！ 極神皇トールVSスカーレット・ノヴァ・ドラゴン)	Yoshifumi Fukushima	September 1, 2010	July 9, 2011
126	34	"When Nordic Gods Attack / Descend! The Second Nordic God - Loki, Lord of the Aesir"; Transliteration: "Kōrin! Daini no Kami Kyokushin'ō Roki" (Japanese: 降臨！ 第二の神 極神皇ロキ)	Yasuyuki Suzuki	September 8, 2010	July 16, 2011
127	35	"Tricking the Trickster / Fierce Fight! Destiny Riding on Blackwings"; Transliteration: "Gekitō! Unmei wo Kaketa Kuroi Hane!" (Japanese: 激闘！ 運命を賭けた黒い羽)	Yasuyuki Suzuki	September 15, 2010	July 23, 2011
128	36	"Yusei's Last Stand / The Three Immortal Aesirs! Cry out, Majestic Star Dragon!"; Transliteration: "Fujimi no Sankyokushin! Sakebe, Seivā Sutā Doragon!" (Japanese: 不死身の三極神！ 叫べ、セイヴァー・スター・ドラゴン！)	Shin Yoshida	September 22, 2010	July 30, 2011
129	37	"Fight to the Finish Line / Gjallarhorn! Countdown To the End"; Transliteration: "Gyararuhorun! Shūen eno Kauntodaun" (Japanese: ギャラルホルン！ 終焉へのカウントダウン)	Shin Yoshida	September 29, 2010	August 6, 2011
130	38	"Bound To The Future, Bonds To Our Companions"; Transliteration: "Mirai he Tsunagu, Nakama tono Kizuna" (Japanese: 未来へつなぐ、仲間との絆)	Shin Yoshida	October 6, 2010	N/A
131	39	"The Beginning of the End / Fight for the Future! Machine Emperor Skiel Infinity VS Red Nova Dragon"; Transliteration: "Mirai wo Kaketa Tatakai! Kikōtei Sukieru Vāsasu Sukāreddo Nova Doragon" (Japanese: 未来を賭けた戦い！ 機皇帝スキエル∞ VS スカーレッド・ノヴァ・ドラゴン)	Toshifumi Kawase	October 13, 2010	August 13, 2011
132	40	"Dawn of the Machines / A Violent Assault!! Machine Emperor Wisel Infinity"; Transliteration: "Kyōshū!! Kikōtei Waizeru" (Japanese: 強襲！！ 機皇帝ワイゼル∞)	Yoshifumi Fukushima	October 20, 2010	August 20, 2011
133	41	"Against All Odds / The Looming Threat! Machine Emperor Grannel Infinity"; Transliteration: "Tachihadakaru Kyotei! Kikōtei Guran'eru" (Japanese: 立ちはだかる巨帝！ 機皇帝グランエル∞)	Kenichi Yamashita	October 27, 2010	August 27, 2011
134	42	"For Synchro's Sake / The Road of Ruin! The Future Favored By Synchro Summoning"; Transliteration: "Hametsu no Michi! Shinkuro Shōkan ga Ikitsuku Mirai" (Japanese: 破滅の道！ シンクロ召喚が行きつく未来)	Yasuyuki Suzuki	November 10, 2010	September 3, 2011

=== Season 5: Fight for the Future (2010–11) ===
No. overall	No. in season	Title	Written by	Original release date	American air date
135	1	"Fight for the Future (Part 1) / The Devil of Despair! Machine Divine Emperor Mechanicle Infinity Cubic"; Transliteration: "Zetsubō no Majin! Kikōshin Mashinikuru Infiniti Kyūbikku" (Japanese: 絶望の魔人！ 機皇帝マシニクルインフィニティ・キュービック)	Toshifumi Kawase	November 17, 2010	September 10, 2011
136	2	"Victory or Doom (Part 2) / A Do-or-Die Battle! The Machine Divine Emperor VS The Synchro Monsters"; Transliteration: "Kesshi no Kōbō! Kikōshin Vāsasu Shinkuro Monsutā" (Japanese: 決死の攻防！ 機皇神VSシンクロモンスタ)	Yoshifumi Fukushima	November 24, 2010	September 10, 2011
137	3	"An Approaching Terror - The Citadel of God, "The Ark Cradle""; Transliteration: "Semarikuru Kyōfu Kami no Kyojō Āku Kureidoru" (Japanese: 迫りくる恐怖神の居城「 アーククレイドル」)	Shin Yoshida	December 1, 2010	N/A
138	4	"The Suspension Bridge Towards the Future - The Rainbow Bridge Bitfrost!"; Transliteration: "Mirai eno Kakehashi - Niji no Hashi Bifuresuto" (Japanese: 未来への架け橋 虹の橋ビフレスト)	Shin Yoshida	December 8, 2010	N/A
139	5	"The Enchanting Field - École de Zone!"; Transliteration: "Genwaku no Fīrudo! Ekōru do Zōn" (Japanese: 幻惑のフィールド エコール・ド・ゾーン！)	Kenichi Yamashita	December 15, 2010	N/A
140	6	"The Soul-Binding Gate! The Sealed Future!"; Transliteration: "Konbakumon! Fūjirareta Mirai!" (Japanese: 魂縛門！ 封じられた未来！)	Kenichi Yamashita	December 22, 2010	N/A
141	7	"The Duel of Despair! Fortissimo the Mobile Fortress!"; Transliteration: "Zetsubō no Dyueru! Kidō Yōsai Foruteshimo!" (Japanese: 絶望のデュエル！ 起動要塞フォルテシモ！)	Yasuyuki Suzuki	December 28, 2010	N/A
142	8	"A Life-or-Death Battle! Machine Divine Emperor Dragon Asterisk"; Transliteration: "Seishi o Kaketa Tatakai! Kikōshinryū Asuterisuku" (Japanese: 生死を懸けた闘い！ 機皇神龍アステリスク)	Yasuyuki Suzuki	January 5, 2011	N/A
143	9	"The Miracle of Life! Life Stream Dragon!!"; Transliteration: "Inochi no Kiseki, Raifu Sutorīmu Doragon!!" (Japanese: 命の奇跡！ ライフ・ストリーム・ドラゴン!!)	Yasuyuki Suzuki, Toshifumi Kawase	January 12, 2011	N/A
144	10	"The Beginning of the End: A Struggle to the Death for the Future!"; Transliteration: "Shūen no Kigen Mirai no Tame no Shitō!" (Japanese: 終焉の起源 未来の為の死闘！)	Toshifumi Kawase	January 19, 2011	N/A
145	11	"Faster Than Light!!"; Transliteration: "Hikari yori mo Hayaku" (Japanese: 光より速く!!)	Toshifumi Kawase	January 26, 2011	N/A
146	12	"The Last Person - Z-ONE"; Transliteration: "Saigo no Hitori Zōn" (Japanese: 最後の一人 Z-ONE)	Yoshifumi Fukushima	February 2, 2011	N/A
147	13	"A Hope Bound for the Future!"; Transliteration: "Mirai he Tsunagu Kibō!" (Japanese: 未来へつなぐ希望！)	Yoshifumi Fukushima	February 9, 2011	N/A
148	14	"Just One Chance To Turn It All Around"; Transliteration: "Tada Ichimai ni Kaketa Shōki" (Japanese: ただ1枚に懸けた勝機)	Kenichi Yamashita	February 16, 2011	N/A
149	15	"The Revived Hero"; Transliteration: "Yomigaetta Eiyū" (Japanese: 蘇った英雄)	Kenichi Yamashita	February 23, 2011	N/A
150	16	"Feelings Entrusted of My Father"; Transliteration: "Chichi ga Takushita Omoi" (Japanese: 父が託した想い)	Kenichi Yamashita	March 2, 2011	N/A
151	17	"Gathering Wishes"; Transliteration: "Tsudoishi Negai" (Japanese: 集いし願い)	Shin Yoshida	March 9, 2011	N/A
152	18	"An Advancing Future"; Transliteration: "Susumubeki Mirai" (Japanese: 進むべき未来)	Yasuyuki Suzuki	March 23, 2011	N/A
153	19	"Clashing Souls!"; Transliteration: "Butsukari au Tamashī!" (Japanese: ぶつかり合う魂！)	Yasuyuki Suzuki	March 30, 2011	N/A
154	20	"Shining Forth To The Future"; Transliteration: "Hikari Sasu Mirai e" (Japanese: 光り差す未来へ)	Shin Yoshida	March 30, 2011	N/A

== Specials ==
No.	Title	Original release date
Special	"Evolving Duel! Stardust Dragon Vs. Red Dragon Archfiend / Evolving Duel! Stardust VS Red Demons"; Transliteration: "Shinkasuru Kettou! Stardust VS Red Demons" (Japanese: 進化する決闘！ スターダスト VS レッド・デーモンズ)	November 25, 2008
Shown at the 2008 Jump Festa anime tour, this non-canon episode features a turbo duel between Yusei Fudo and Jack Atlas, promoting the Crimson Crisis booster packs from the trading card game. Yusei and Jack summon their Stardust Dragon and Red Dragon Archfiend respectively and power them up to their Assault Modes. They both then face off against each other, with both of them at a stalemate, until Yusei plays the trap card Synchro Destructor, from his Graveyard. During his turn, Yusei has Stardust Dragon attack Red Dragon Archfiend, destroying Jack's monster, and then activates Synchro Destructor, whose effect reduces Jack's remaining life points down to 0, resulting in Yusei being the winner.

== Movies ==
No.	Title	Original release date	American release date
Movie	"Yu-Gi-Oh! Bonds Beyond Time / Yu-Gi-Oh! Movie: Super Fusion! Bonds that Transcend Time"; Transliteration: "Tensu Anivāsarī Gekijōban Yū☆Gi☆Ō ~Chō Yūgō! Toki o Koeta Kizuna~" (Japanese: 劇場版 遊☆戯☆王 ～超融合！時空を越えた絆～)	January 23, 2010	February 26, 2011
This movie takes place near the end of Season 3, right before the events of Crash Town (Episodes 86-92). Yusei Fudo travels back in time and fights alongside Yugi Muto, and Jaden Yuki, to stop a new enemy named Paradox from destroying the future of dueling, by ruining the past. This canon movie follows the plot line developed in 3 of the Yu-Gi-Oh! franchise's anime series: Yu-Gi-Oh! Duel Monsters, Yu-Gi-Oh! GX, and Yu-Gi-Oh! 5D's.

== See also ==
- Yu-Gi-Oh! Duel Monsters
- Yu-Gi-Oh! R
- Yu-Gi-Oh! GX
- Yu-Gi-Oh! Zexal
- Yu-Gi-Oh! Arc-V
- Yu-Gi-Oh! VRAINS
- Yu-Gi-Oh! Sevens
