= Mine (Phoebe Ryan EP) =

EP by Phoebe Ryan
- Released: June 9, 2015
- Genres: Pop; electropop
- Length: 18:14
- Label: Columbia
- Producers: Phoebe Ryan (exec.); Kyle Shearer (exec.)

Phoebe Ryan chronology
Mine (2015)	James (2017)

Singles from Mine
- 1. "Ignition/Do You" Released: January 21, 2015; 2. "Mine" Released: January 27, 2015; 3. "Dead" Released: March 9, 2015

Mine is the debut extended play (EP) by American singer Phoebe Ryan, released on June 9, 2015 by Columbia Records. The album contains two previously released songs, "Mine" and "Dead". Also included was the first song she released as an artist, "Ignition/Do You", a mashup of R. Kelly's "Ignition" and Miguel's "Do You...".

== Singles ==
- "Ignition/Do You" was released as the first single on January 21, 2015.
- "Mine" was released as the EP's second single on January 27, 2015.
- "Dead" was released as the final single on March 9, 2015.

== Critical reception ==
Meggie Morris of Renowned for Sound gave the album four out of five stars, writing "Phoebe Ryan's debut sees her join the ranks of several female pop artists that work in the same arena, including Tove Lo , Lights and Ellie Goulding. While this brand of entrancing, lush pop is so popular right now, it’s Ryan’s immaculate songwriting and "innate pop nous" (as described by Noisey) that will help her launch a conspicuous solo career."

== Track listing ==
Mine — extended play
No.	Title	Writer(s)	Length
1.	"Mine"	Phoebe Ryan; Kyle Shearer; Nate Campany	3:47
2.	"Dead"	Ryan; Shearer; Campany	3:40
3.	"Homie"	Ryan; Shearer	3:18
4.	"Ignition/Do You"	Ryan; Lukasz Sebastian Gottwald; Paul Pesco; Miguel Pimentel; Jerry "Wonda" Duplessis; Greg Kurstin; R. Kelly	3:48
5.	"Mine (Michael Keenan remix)" (featuring Skizzy Mars)	Ryan; Myles Mills; Shearer; Campany	3:45
Total length:			18:14

== Release history ==
Region	Release date	Format	Ref.
Various	June 9, 2015	Digital download	
Various	June 9, 2015	CD	
Various	June 9, 2015	Vinyl	
