= Phoebe Ryan =

American singer and songwriter (born 1990)

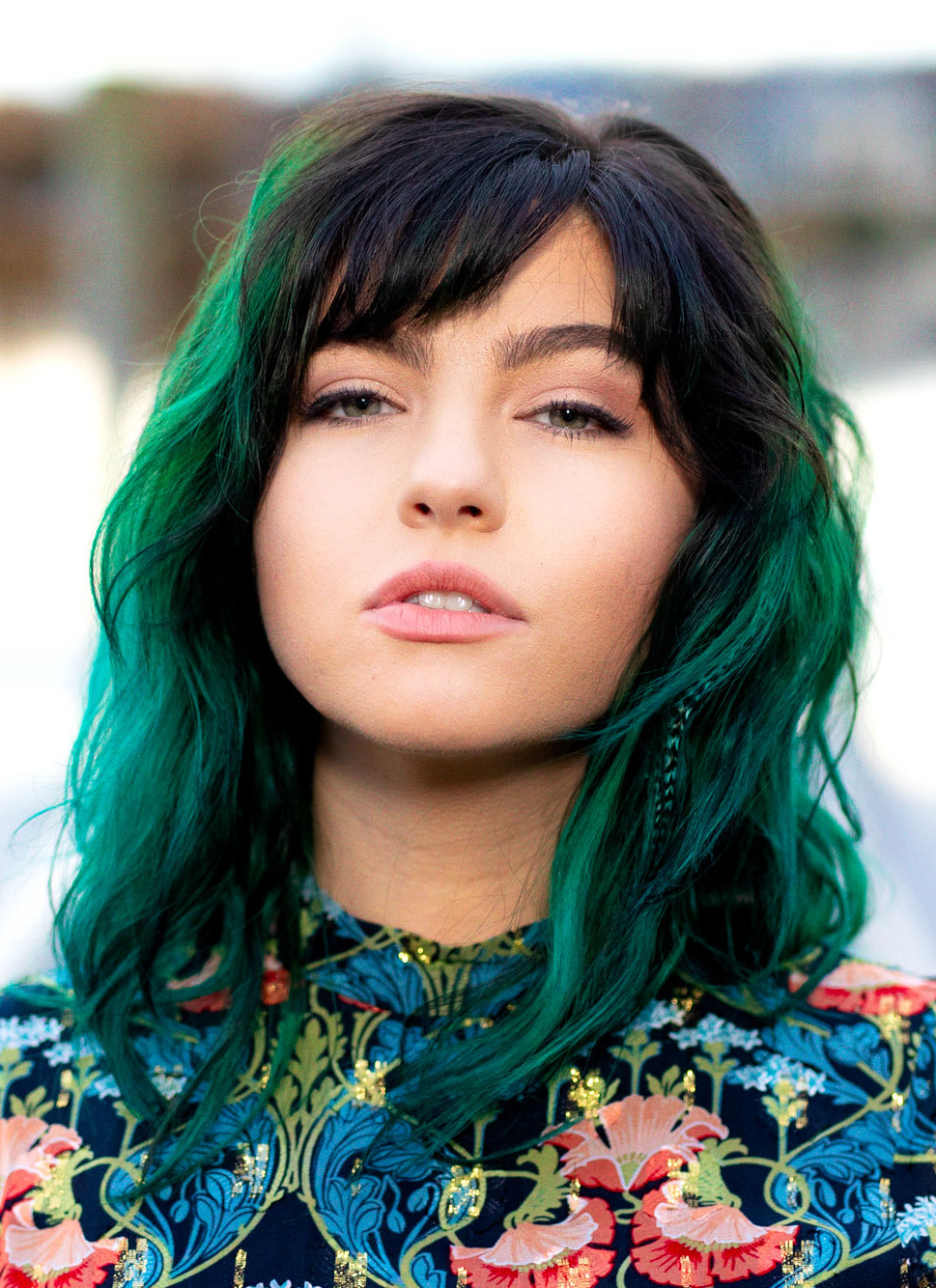
- Ryan in 2019

Background information
- Born: Phoebe Holiday Ryan; September 21, 1990 (age 36); Dallas, Texas, U.S.
- Origin: Red Bank, New Jersey, U.S.
- Genres: Pop; indie pop; electropop
- Occupations: Singer; songwriter
- Instruments: Vocals; guitar
- Years active: 2013–present
- Labels: Columbia; Neon Gold; Independently Popular; Remarkable Babe Records
- Website: phoeberyanofficial.com

Phoebe Holiday Ryan (born September 21, 1990) is an American singer and songwriter. In 2015, she released a mashup of R. Kelly's "Ignition" and Miguel's "Do You", followed by her first single "Mine" from her debut EP of the same name. She signed with Columbia Records in 2015.

As a songwriter, she has written for artists such as Britney Spears, Oh Honey, Zara Larsson, Melanie Martinez, and Bea Miller, and featured on songs by the Knocks, Tritonal, Skizzy Mars, and the Chainsmokers, among others.

== Background ==
Born in Dallas, Texas and raised in Red Bank, New Jersey, Ryan attended Clive Davis Institute of Recorded Music at New York University, where she studied engineering, production and business. She debated between being a songwriter or an artist before deciding to do both.

== Music career ==
Ryan's music career began as a vocalist with Town Hall, a band she was part of in college. After the release of Town Hall's album Roots & Bells, she began writing songs for artists such as Oh Honey, rapper Skizzy Mars and Bea Miller. In 2014, she was featured on DJ duo Tritonal's single "Now or Never", and in 2015, she released her first song as an artist, "Ignition/Do You", a mashup of "Ignition" and "Do You". Her first two original singles, "Mine" and "Dead", followed shortly thereafter. Previously, she auditioned for the eighth season of American Idol, making it to the Hollywood rounds before being eliminated.

In 2015, Ryan signed a deal with Columbia Records, which released her debut EP, Mine. Her songs have been praised by bloggers and artists alike, with Tove Lo calling "Mine" "GOLD", Taylor Swift including the song on a handwritten list titled "New Songs That Will Make Your Life More Awesome (I promise!)", The Fader calling it "excellent", and Billboard calling Ryan's voice "magnetic". In 2015, Nylon called Ryan a pop singer "primed for stardom".

On March 4, 2016, Ryan released "Chronic", an electropop song. The music video was released in April. "Boyz N Poizn" was released as the second single on May 5, 2016, with its music video released in June.

Bea Miller's song "Young Blood", co-written by Ryan, peaked at number 4 on the Billboard Dance Club Songs and number 40 on the Billboard Mainstream Top 40. It received a Radio Disney Music Award for "Best Song to Rock Out to With your BFFs".

On September 29, 2016, Ryan released the song "All We Know" as part of a collaboration with The Chainsmokers. The song peaked at number 18 on the US Billboard Hot 100 and at number 24 on the UK Singles Chart. On February 3, 2017, Ryan released a new single, "Dark Side".

On August 3, 2017, Ryan released the song "Forgetting All About You", featuring blackbear. It was produced by Big Taste and serves as the lead single from her second extended play, James (2017). James was released on October 27, 2017.

In May 2019, Ryan was announced as the opening act for the second half of Carly Rae Jepsen's Dedicated Tour in the U.S.

In February 2020, Ryan began touring with K-pop artist Eric Nam, as the opening act for his Before We Begin World Tour.

On July 31, 2020, Ryan released her first studio album, How It Used to Feel, consisting of 13 tracks, including four released earlier as singles: "A Thousand Ways", "ICIMY", "Ring", and "Fantasy". She posted on her social media accounts that she began writing songs for her debut album in the summer of 2017. In an interview with V magazine, she said, "I’ve always been an open book as an artist and I think it’s better to share experiences with others. How else will people connect?”.

== Discography ==
=== Studio albums ===
Album	Details
How It Used to Feel	Released: July 31, 2020; Label: Independently Popular; Formats: Digital download, Vinyl
Yours	Released: August 14, 2026; Label: Remarkable Babe Records; Formats: Digital download, Vinyl

=== Extended plays ===
Album	Details
Mine	Released: June 9, 2015; Label: Columbia; Formats: CD, Digital download, Vinyl
James	Released: October 27, 2017; Label: Columbia; Formats: Digital download
Love Is A River (Note: Singles from Phoebe Ryan' second studio album were released to digital retailers atop a new EP containing each previous single. Love Is A River – EP includes the first four singles released for the Yours album.: Fall With Me – EP; Yours – EP (Lated change title to Something To Hope For – EP))	Released: June 26, 2026; Label: Remarkable Babe Records; Formats: Digital download

=== Singles ===
==== As lead artist ====
Single	Year	Charts		Album
Single	Year	US Dance Airplay	US Electro	Album
"Ignition / Do You..."	2015	—	—	Mine
"Mine"	2015	—	—	Mine
"Dead"	2015	—	—	Mine
"Chronic"	2016	—	—	Non-album singles
"Boyz n Poizn"	2016	—	—	Non-album singles
"Dollar Bill" (featuring Kid Ink)	2016	—	—	Non-album singles
"Dark Side"	2017	—	—	Non-album singles
"Forgetting All About You" (featuring blackbear)	2017	—	—	James
"Be Real"	2017	—	—	James
"James Has Changed"	2017	—	—	James
"Almost Back" (with Kaskade and LöKii)	2018	40	48	Non-album single
"Middle Finger" (with Quinn XCII)	2018	—	—	Non-album single
"A Thousand Ways"	2019	—	—	How it Used to Feel
"Build Me Up"	2019	—	—	Non-album single
"ICIMY"	2019	—	—	How it Used to Feel
"Ring"	2020	—	—	How it Used to Feel
"Fantasy"	2020	—	—	How it Used to Feel
"A World I Don’t Know" (with Alan Walker and Kaeleb)	2026	—	—	World of Walker, Season One: Rise of The Drones
"Something to Hope For"	2026	—	—	Yours
"Fall With Me"	2026	—	—	Yours
"Yours"	2026	—	—	Yours
"Love Is A River"	2026	—	—	Yours
"Still Your Girl"	2026	—	—	Yours
"—" denotes a recording that did not chart or was not released in that territory.

==== As featured artist ====
List of singles as featured artist, with selected chart positions and certifications, showing year released and album name
Title	Year	Peak chart positions										Certifications	Album
Title	Year	US	AUS	AUT	BEL	CAN	FRA	NL	NOR	SWE	UK	Certifications	Album
"Chasing" (Mt Eden featuring Phoebe Ryan)	2013	—	—	—	—	—	—	—	—	—	—		Walking On Air
"Now or Never" (Tritonal featuring Phoebe Ryan)	2014	— (Note: "Now or Never did not enter the Billboard Hot 100, but peaked at number 20 on the Dance/Electronic Digital Song Sales chart, number 5 on the Dance/Mix Show Airplay chart, and 30 on the Dance/Electronic Songs chart.)	—	—	—	—	—	—	—	—	—		Metamorphic II EP
"The City" (Skizzy Mars featuring Phoebe Ryan)	2015	—	—	—	—	—	—	—	—	—	—		The Red Balloon Project EP
"We Won't" (Jaymes Young featuring Phoebe Ryan)	2015	—	—	—	—	—	—	—	—	—	—		Feel Something
"Purple Eyes" (The Knocks featuring Phoebe Ryan)	2016	—	—	—	—	—	—	—	—	—	—		55
"All We Know" (The Chainsmokers featuring Phoebe Ryan)	2016	18	8	15	15	14	185	34	14	24	24	RIAA: Platinum; ARIA: Platinum	Collage
"Haze" (Lemaitre featuring Phoebe Ryan)	2016	—	—	—	—	—	—	—	—	—	—		Afterglow
"SO DONE" (SEBASTIAN PAUL featuring Phoebe Ryan)	2019		—	—	—	—	—	—	—	—	—		BOY OH BOY
"Ride or Die" (Cash Cash featuring Phoebe Ryan)	2021	—	—	—	—	—	—	—	—	—	—		Say It Like You Feel It
"Product of the 90s" (Phangs featuring Phoebe Ryan)	2021	—	—	—	—	—	—	—	—	—	—		I Love Everything That You Hate About Yourself
"HORNY" (Pussy Riot featuring Phoebe Ryan)	2022		—	—	—	—	—	—	—	—	—		Matriarchy Now
"Bad Decisions" (Stefan Alexander featuring Phoebe Ryan)	2023	—	—	—	—	—	—	—	—	—	—		Non-album single
"—" denotes a single that did not chart or was not released.

=== Guest appearances ===
List of non-single guest appearances, with other performing artists, showing year released and album name
Title	Year	Other artist(s)	Album
"Heart Attack"	2018	Tove Lo	NGX: Ten Years of Neon Gold
"Brave Enough To Be Unknown"	2026	Alan Walker	World of Walker, Season One: Rise of The Drones

=== Music videos ===
List of music videos, showing year released and directors
Title	Year	Director(s)	Note(s)
As lead artist
"Mine"	2015	Jon Hoeg	Official Video
"Dead"	2015	Jon Hoeg, Jesse Deflorio	Official Video
"Homie"	2015	Lisa Paclet	Official Video
"Ignition / Do You... (Mashup)"	2016	John Hoeg	Official Video
"Mine"	2016	Kimi Selfridge	Lyric Video
"Chronic"	2016	Simian Design	Lyric Video
"Chronic"	2016	Anthony Churro	Official Video
"Boyz N Poizn"	2016	Blythe Thomas	Official Video
"Dollar Bill" (featuring Kid Ink)	2016	Blythe Thomas	Official Video
"Dark Side"	2017	–	Lyric Video
"Forgetting All About You" (featuring blackbear)	2017	Phoebe Ryan	Animation
"A Thousand Ways"	2019	Shane Scherholz	Official Video
"Build Me Up"	2019	Matt Porter	Official Video
"ICIMY"	2019	Matthew Lyons	Official Video
"Ring"	2019	Matthew Lyons	Official Video
"Fantasy"	2019	Richie Brown	Animation
"Something to Hope For"	2026	Paige Strabala	Official Video
"Fall With Me"	2026	Paige Strabala	Official Video
"Yours"	2026	Paige Strabala	Official Video
"Love Is A River"	2026	Paige Strabala	Official Video
As featured artist
"Now Or Never" (Tritonal featuring Phoebe Ryan)	2013	GulpFims	Lyric Video
"All We Know" (The Chainsmokers featuring Phoebe Ryan)	2016	Rory Kramer	Official Video
"We Won't" (with Jaymes Young)	2017	Alexander Brown	Official Video
"Ride or Die" (Cash Cash featuring Phoebe Ryan)	2021	Basa	Animation

=== Songwriting credits ===
Year	Artist	Album	Song
2013	Oh, Honey	With Love	"Be Okay"
2013	Oh, Honey	With Love	"Lonely Neighbor"
2013	Oh, Honey	With Love	"Get It Right"
2013	Oh, Honey	With Love	"Sugar, You"
2013	Oh, Honey	With Love	"It Can't Rain Forever"
2013	Oh, Honey	With Love	"Until You Let Me"
2013	Oh, Honey	With Love	Take All the Time You Need
2013	Mt Eden	Walking on Air	"Walking On Air"
2013	Tritonal	Metamorphic II – EP	"Now or Never"
2014	Alli Simpson	–	"Guilty"
2014	Benjamin	Square One	"Underdogs"
2014	Bea Miller	Young Blood	"Young Blood"
2015	Melanie Martinez	Cry Baby	"Teddy Bear"
2015	Skizzy Mars	The Red Balloon Project	"The City"
2016	Benjamin	Fingerprints	"Young and Restless"
2016	Britney Spears	Glory	"Man On The Moon"
2016	The Knocks	55	"The Key"
2016	The Knocks	55	"Purple Eyes" (featuring Phoebe Ryan)
2016	Wyclef Jean	Non-album single	"My Girl" (featuring Sasha Mari)
2017	The Chainsmokers	Memories...Do Not Open	"Bloodstream"
2017	Danny L. Harle	1UL	"1UL"
2017	Danny L. Harle	1UL	"Heavy Eyelids" (featuring Phoebe Ryan)
2017	Jaymes Young	Feel Something	"We Won't"
2017	All Time Low	Last Young Renegade	"Ground Control" (featuring Tegan and Sara)
2018	LPX	Junk of the Heart – EP	"Might Not Make It Home"
