= Turn the Lights Back On =

Single by Billy Joel
- Released: February 1, 2024
- Genre: Pop; pop rock
- Length: 3:58; 4:21 (7" version)
- Label: Columbia
- Songwriters: Billy Joel; Freddy Wexler; Arthur Bacon; Wayne Hector
- Producers: Freddy Wexler; Parisi (co-producers); Emile Haynie (additional production)

Billy Joel singles chronology
| "Christmas in Fallujah" (2007) | "Turn the Lights Back On" (2024) |

Music video
- "Turn the Lights Back On" on YouTube

"Turn the Lights Back On" is a single by American musician Billy Joel. It was released on February 1, 2024, through Columbia Records, and was Joel's first new single since "Christmas in Fallujah" was released in 2007. The song was written by Joel, Freddy Wexler (who also produced the track), Arthur Bacon, and Wayne Hector.

The song debuted at number 11 on the Billboard Adult Contemporary chart, becoming his first entry on the chart since his 1997 cover of "Hey Girl". It held that position for another week before subsequently rising to number ten, which gave Joel his 24th top ten single on the Adult Contemporary Chart. It also entered the Billboard Hot 100 at number 62, becoming his first entry on the chart since his cover of "To Make You Feel My Love" in 1997. The chart debut of "Turn the Lights Back On" occurred nearly 50 years after Joel's first appearance on the Hot 100, when "Piano Man" debuted at number 94 on the chart dated February 24, 1974. Joel performed the song at the 66th Grammy Awards accompanied by singer and musician Laufey, which was the first time he played at the ceremony since 2002.

== Background ==
Joel stopped making pop music after River of Dreams in 1993, although he continued to receive offers from other artists to collaborate on new material. "I've always resisted it. I studiously avoided it because songwriting had become painful." However, Joel changed his mind when Wexler showed him "Turn the Lights Back On". "I could have written these lyrics verbatim. I've chewed on these words and I've thought of these words, and I've said these words before. It was all kind of falling into place — and who am I to fight that?" Joel further added that he gravitated toward the song's chord progression, melody, and time signature, which prompted him to finish the song with Wexler.

Wexler's wife initiated the encounter between her husband and Joel when she tracked down one of Joel's previous family physicians, who then arranged a meeting between the two songwriters. Wexler recalled that they "found these very unique points of commonality in the first 15 minutes of sitting together" and ended up chatting for two hours. During their conversation, Wexler asked Joel if he had any unreleased material and offered to help finish some of his songs. Joel sent Wexler a CD of unfinished works, and the two spent over a year developing the material. Two years after their original meeting, Wexler presented Joel with "Turn the Lights Back On", who agreed to record it. "Billy has said in his own words, 'I think it was fate' that we met and that I presented this song a couple of years into our writing process. It really does feel like an idea he would have started himself."

== Music videos ==
An official lyric video was released on February 1, 2024, to coincide with the single's release. Two weeks later, a music video directed by Warren Fu and Freddy Wexler was released. The music video features artificial intelligence technology developed by Deep Voodoo, which was used to portray younger versions of Joel performing the song. Depictions of Joel from The Stranger era, The Bridge era, and River of Dreams era were included in the music video. Set in Manhattan's United Palace, the music video begins with Joel flipping a notebook page containing the lyrics for "Famous Last Words", the final track on his River of Dreams album.

== Critical reception ==
Andy Greene of Rolling Stone described the song as a "romantic ballad", further adding that the song "doubles as a message to fans that have waited all these years for new material".

== Track listing ==
=== 7-inch US single ===
1. "Turn the Lights Back On" – 4:21
2. "Turn the Lights Back On" – 4:21

=== Japan special CD version ===
1. "Turn the Lights Back On" – 4:01
2. "Turn the Lights Back On" (extended vinyl version) – 4:21

== Charts ==
=== Weekly charts ===
Weekly chart performance for "Turn the Lights Back On"
| Chart (2024) | Peak position |
|---|---|
| Israel (Media Forest) | 1 |
| Japan Hot Overseas (Billboard Japan) | 7 |
| UK Singles Downloads (OCC) | 12 |
| UK Singles Sales (OCC) | 4 |
| US Billboard Hot 100 | 62 |
| US Adult Contemporary (Billboard) | 7 |
| US Adult Pop Airplay (Billboard) | 37 |

=== Year-end charts ===
2024 year-end chart performance for "Turn the Lights Back On"
| Chart (2024) | Position |
|---|---|
| US Adult Contemporary (Billboard) | 14 |
