= All My Life (Billy Joel song) =

Single by Billy Joel
- B-side: "You're My Home"
- Released: February 14, 2007
- Recorded: December 29, 2006
- Studio: Legacy Studios
- Genre: Traditional pop
- Length: 5:19
- Label: Sony
- Songwriter: Billy Joel
- Producer: Phil Ramone

Billy Joel singles chronology
"Hey Girl" (1997)	"All My Life" (2007)	"Christmas in Fallujah" (2007)

"All My Life" is a song by Billy Joel, his first new song of original material with lyrics he had written since 1993's River of Dreams. The song, produced by Phil Ramone, tells of Joel's experience of finding love in his later years after previous failed relationships. It was written for his then-wife Katie Lee as an anniversary gift, and released as a promotional single on February 14, 2007.

== Background and production ==
Billy Joel retired from songwriting after finishing his last studio album River of Dreams in 1993, instead limiting himself to touring and instrumental music. In 2004, he married Katie Lee. Joel recorded "All My Life" in 2006 as an anniversary gift for his wife. The song was produced by Phil Ramone. The release of "All My Life" was announced by his label in January 2007. It was given a Valentine's Day release on February 14, when it was released on the website of People magazine, as a promotional single. The CD release included a live version of "You're My Home".

== Lyrics ==
"All My Life" has been described as a pop song and a pop standard. It tells of a man who finds love only after growing older, having suffered many failed relationships before finding his partner.

== Critical reception ==
The song has been compared to the work of Frank Sinatra. Music critic William Ruhlmann likened the song to those of the Great American Songbook and speculated that it would become the fare of cabaret singers. Christopher Bonanos of Vulture described Joel's performance as "out Tony Bennett-ing Tony Bennett". Biographer Ken Bielen described it as a saloon ballad.

== Japan B-sides ==
In addition to "You're My Home", the Japanese-only physical CD single release includes two more live tracks, "Honesty" and "Stiletto". All three tracks were recorded in 2006 during the series of 12 sold-out concerts in New York City's Madison Square Garden which yielded the 12 Gardens Live album, but were not originally included in that album. In those performances, "Honesty" and many other Joel hits were transposed into lower keys than the original album versions; "Honesty" was moved a half-step lower, from the key of B-flat major to the key of A major.

The Japanese release also includes a booklet with English lyrics and Japanese translations for all four songs.

== Chart positions ==
Charts	Peak position
Japan Oricon Weekly Singles Chart	94
U.S. Billboard Hot Singles Sales	1
