= Dark Side (Phoebe Ryan song) =

Single by Phoebe Ryan
- Released: February 3, 2017
- Genre: Electropop
- Length: 3:24
- Label: Columbia
- Songwriter(s): Phoebe Ryan; Elof Loelv; Jason Gill
- Producer(s): Elof Loelv; Jason Gill

Phoebe Ryan singles chronology
"All We Know" (2016)	"Dark Side" (2017)	"Forgetting All About You" (2017)

"Dark Side" is a song by American singer and songwriter Phoebe Ryan. It was released on February 3, 2017, as the intended lead single off of her forthcoming debut studio album through Columbia Records, though it was later scrapped. The single was written by Ryan along with Elof Loelv and Jason Gill, who have collaborated with artists such as Tove Lo. The track was recorded in Sweden.

== Background ==
"Dark Side" serves as the first single from Ryan's upcoming debut studio album, which was expected to be released in the fall of 2017. The artist released it following touring with Tove Lo, the release of her collaboration "All We Know" with the Chainsmokers, and writing for artists such as Britney Spears.

== Composition ==
"Dark Side" has been described as an electronic-infused electropop tune that contains a "relaxed rhythm feel". Ryan herself described the song's lyrics, stating the track "is about being in love with someone who may not necessarily be the best for you, but you're too deep in it to care. You find the best in them no matter what they do."

== Release ==
"Dark Side" was released on February 3, 2017, as the intended single from her forthcoming debut studio album, which is expected to be released in the fall. A remix by Swedish duo NOTD was released on March 17, 2017.

== Track listing ==
- Digital download
1. "Dark Side" – 3:24
- NOTD remix
1. "Dark Side" (NOTD Remix) – 3:24

== Personnel ==
Adapted from Tidal.

- Phoebe Ryan – vocals, composition
- Jason Gill – composition, production
- Elof Loelv – composition, production

== Release history ==
Release history and formats for "Dark Side"
Region	Release date	Format	Version	Ref.
Various	February 3, 2017	Digital download; streaming	Original	
Sweden	February 3, 2017	CD single	Original	
Various	March 17, 2017	Digital download; streaming	Remixes	
