= Forgetting All About You =

2017 single by Phoebe Ryan

Single by Phoebe Ryan featuring blackbear

from the album James
- Released: August 4, 2017
- Length: 3:19
- Label: Columbia
- Songwriters: Phoebe Ryan; Matthew Musto; Leroy Clampitt; Joseph Kirkland; Jason Dean
- Producer: Big Taste

Phoebe Ryan singles chronology
"Dark Side" (2017)	"Forgetting All About You" (2017)	"Be Real" (2017)

blackbear singles chronology
"Talk Is Overrated" (2017)	"Forgetting All About You" (2017)	"Playboy Shit" (2017)

"Forgetting All About You" is a song recorded by the American singer and songwriter Phoebe Ryan, featuring guest vocals by the American recording artist blackbear. It was released on August 4, 2017, as the lead single from her second extended play, James (2017). Both artists wrote the track along with Joseph Kirkland, Jason Dean and Leroy Clampitt, the latter of whom produced it. The artwork for the single was created by Ryan herself. Ryan performed the song at the Billboard Hot 100 Festival.

== Composition ==
"Forgetting All About You" continues Ryan's transition from indie pop to a more mainstream pop musical style. It has a length of three minutes and nineteen seconds. The single lyrically talks about getting over a breakup.

== Music video ==
The music video for "Forgetting All About You" was released on August 18, 2017. It shows a series of hand drawings and animations by Ryan, with the lyrics shown in handwritten text.

== Track listing ==
Taken from ITunes.

No.	Title	Length
1.	"Forgetting All About You" (featuring blackbear)	3:19

== Personnel ==
Taken from Tidal.

- Phoebe Ryan – lyrics, composition
- Blackbear – lyrics, composition
- Joseph Kirkland – lyrics, composition
- Big Taste – lyrics, composition, production
- Jason Dean – lyrics, composition

== Release history ==
Region	Release date	Format	Ref.
Various	August 4, 2017	Digital download	
