= James (EP) =

EP by Phoebe Ryan
- Released: October 27, 2017
- Recorded: 2016–2017
- Genres: Pop; synth-pop; electropop; R&B
- Length: 17:26
- Label: Columbia
- Producers: Valley Girl; Antti Hynninen; Big Taste

Phoebe Ryan chronology
Mine (2015)	James (2017)

Singles from James
- 1. "Forgetting All About You" Released: August 4, 2017; 2. "Be Real" Released: September 8, 2017; 3. "James Has Changed" Released: October 6, 2017

James is the second extended play by American singer-songwriter Phoebe Ryan, released on October 27, 2017, by Columbia Records. It serves as the follow-up to her 2015 extended play, Mine (2015). The EP was preceded by the release of three singles, and was promoted by a tour span from late October to mid-November 2017.

== Background and composition ==
James is a pop EP that bases its musical composition in 1980s-inspired synth-pop, modern electropop, and contemporary R&B. The album lyrically chronicles a relationship from beginning to end.

== Promotion ==
=== Singles ===
- "Forgetting All About You" featuring American R&B singer, blackbear was released on August 4, 2017, as the lead single from the EP. It was supported by both a music video and a performance at the Billboard Hot 100 Festival.
- "Be Real" was released as the second single on September 8, 2017. A remix EP was released the same month.
- "James Has Changed" was released as the third and final single on October 6, 2017.

=== Tour ===
In addition to the three singles being promoted, Ryan also embarked on a tour in support of the extended play. The tour began on October 31, 2017, and concluded on November 14, 2017.

== Critical reception ==
Mike Wass of Idolator gave the album a positive review; he praised Ryan for "[examining] matters of the heart with rare honesty and a razor-sharp wit. Each song leads effortlessly into the next, which is no easy feat considering that they explore wildly different sounds."

== Track listing ==
Digital download
No.	Title	Writer(s)	Producer	Length
1.	"Should I"	Phoebe Ryan; Kyle Shearer; Nate Campany	Valley Girl	3:05
2.	"Be Real"	Ryan; Shearer; Campany	Valley Girl	3:42
3.	"Aspirin"	Ryan; Lucas Nordqvist; Antti Hynninen; Jurek Reunamäki	Antti Hynninen	3:57
4.	"James Has Changed"	Ryan; Joonas Laaksoharju; Leroy Clampitt; Axel Ehnström	Big Taste	3:22
5.	"Forgetting All About You" (featuring blackbear)	Ryan; Matthew Musto; Clampitt; Joseph Kirkland; Jason Dean	Big Taste	3:20
Total length:				17:26

== Personnel ==
Credits adapted from Tidal.

- Phoebe Ryan – lead vocals, songwriting
- Kyle Shearer – songwriting (tracks 1–2), record engineering (tracks 1–2)
- Nathaniel Campany – songwriting (tracks 1–2)
- Valley Girl – production (tracks 1–2)
- Joe Zook – mix engineering (track 1)
- Paul Hammond – engineer assistance (track 1)
- Mitch McCarthy – mix engineering (track 2)
- Justin Shturtz – master engineering
- Jordan "DJ Swivel" Young – mix engineering (tracks 3–5)
- Lucas Nordqvist – songwriting (track 3)
- Jurek Reunamäki – songwriting (track 3)
- Frans Mernick – record engineering (track 3)
- Antti Hynninen – songwriting, production, record engineering (track 3)
- Joonas Laaksoharju – songwriting (track 4)
- Axel Ehnström – songwriting (track 4)
- Big Taste – songwriting, production (tracks 4–5)
- Blackbear – featured artist, songwriting (track 5)
- Joseph Kirkland – songwriting (track 5)
- Jason Dean – songwriting (track 5)
