= Christmas in Fallujah =

- Artwork for Billy Joel recording

Single by Cass Dillon and Billy Joel
- Released: December 4, 2007
- Recorded: 2007
- Genre: Rock
- Songwriter: Billy Joel

Billy Joel singles chronology
"All My Life" (2007)	"Christmas in Fallujah" (2007)	"Turn the Lights Back On" (2024)

"Christmas in Fallujah" is a single written by Billy Joel and performed by Cass Dillon. A few weeks after recording the track, Joel introduced Dillon on stage in Chicago for the first live performance of the song. It is also Joel's second new song of original material with lyrics he had written since 1993's River of Dreams after "All My Life".

The single was released on December 4, 2007, exclusively from the iTunes Store and was included on Dillon's EP A Good Thing Never Dies (iTunes download). The proceeds from this single were donated to Homes for Our Troops, a nonprofit organization that builds specially adapted homes for American service members returning from Iraq (Fallujah is a city in Iraq) and Afghanistan with severe disabilities.

== Live performances ==
Joel performed "Christmas in Fallujah" live in Australia in November 2008, marking the first time he sang the lyrics to the song instead of Dillon. On December 11, 2008, Joel announced that a new recording of the song that day at Sydney's Acer Arena concert would be released as a download and CD single in honor of the American and Australian soldiers serving in the Middle East. This is the only official recording of Joel singing "Christmas in Fallujah" that is available.

== Charts ==
Chart performance for "Christmas in Fallujah" (live)
Chart (2008)	Peak position
Australia Physical Singles (ARIA)	46
