= Be Real (Phoebe Ryan song) =

Single by Phoebe Ryan

from the album James
- Released: September 8, 2017
- Recorded: 2016
- Genre: Synth-pop; hip hop
- Length: 3:42
- Label: Columbia
- Songwriter(s): Phoebe Ryan; Kyle Shearer; Nathaniel Campany
- Producer(s): Valley Girl

Phoebe Ryan singles chronology
"Forgetting All About You" (2017)	"Be Real" (2017)	"James Has Changed" (2017)

"Be Real" is a song recorded by American singer-songwriter Phoebe Ryan. It was released on September 8, 2017, as the second single from her second extended play, James (2017). Remixes for the single were released the same month.

== Composition ==
"Be Real" is a synth-pop and hip hop song with a length of three minutes and forty two seconds. The song lyrically talks about wanting honesty in a relationship that no longer feels genuine. The song was penned by Ryan, Kyle Shearer, and Nathaniel Campany, while Valley Girl handled the production of the song.

== Critical reception ==
Ariella Kozin of We Are the Guard wrote that the song marks a "sweet spot that makes a hit song—it's vulnerable, but not without a glamorous mask."

== Track listing ==
Digital download
No.	Title	Length
1.	"Be Real"	3:42

Remix EP
No.	Title	Length
1.	"Be Real" (NOTD Remix)	3:35
2.	"Be Real" (DJ Mike D Remix)	3:50

== Personnel ==
Adapted from Tidal.

- Phoebe Ryan – lead vocals, songwriting
- Kyle Shearer – songwriting, record engineering
- Nathaniel Campany – songwriting
- Valley Girl – production
- Mitch McCarthy – mix engineering
- Justin Shturtz – master engineering

== Release history ==
Region	Release date	Format	Ref.
Worldwide	September 8, 2017	Digital download	
