= Cass Dillon =

American singer-songwriter (born 1986)

Cass Dillon (born May 3, 1986) is an American singer-songwriter from Long Island, New York, whose first release is a song written by Billy Joel titled "Christmas in Fallujah".

== Career ==
Dillon's first major release was written by Billy Joel and titled "Christmas in Fallujah". Joel wrote the song after receiving many letters from military service members serving in Iraq but chose not to perform it because he "thought it should be somebody young, about a soldier's age." Dillon came to Joel's attention through his longtime musical director Tommy Byrnes and artist manager Stefano DiBenedetto with whom Dillon had worked. The song was released to the public on iTunes on December 4, 2007, the day after being previewed on The Howard Stern Show. Proceeds from the song were donated to Homes For Our Troops, which builds homes for severely wounded veterans of the Iraq and Afghanistan wars.

From 2010 until 2012, Dillon was in a relationship with Joel's daughter, Alexa Ray Joel. The pair met when Dillon was hired to play guitar on Alexa Ray Joel's upcoming album on which he co-wrote "Say Something".

Dillon provided vocals for the opening theme Hyper Drive for the English dub of Yu-Gi-Oh! 5D's. Dillon has opened for artists Gavin DeGraw and OneRepublic, and has performed on several network TV shows, including Katie Couric, FOX and Friends Morning Show, The Early Show News, The Second Cup Cafe, The View, and Good Morning America. One of his songs was included in the 2014 romantic comedy My Man is a Loser.

Billboard magazine included Dillon as one of their favorite unsigned songwriters.

Alongside singing, Dillon is also a multi-instrumentalist, producer, and an actor, having starred in a supporting role in the 2014 film Song One, starring Anne Hathaway.

Cass Dillon released a new single "I Love You" The single, inspired by the passing of his longtime manager's father, "has the charm of raw Americana folk, a warm intimate indie production presence, and the melodic and lyrical hook of a hit pop song. Its immediate release has been pulling the heartstrings and capturing the eyes and ears of listeners, quickly catching the attention of local and national radio".

Cass Dillon released his EP Oregon Road in 2016 on Spotify.
