= Mt Eden (musician) =

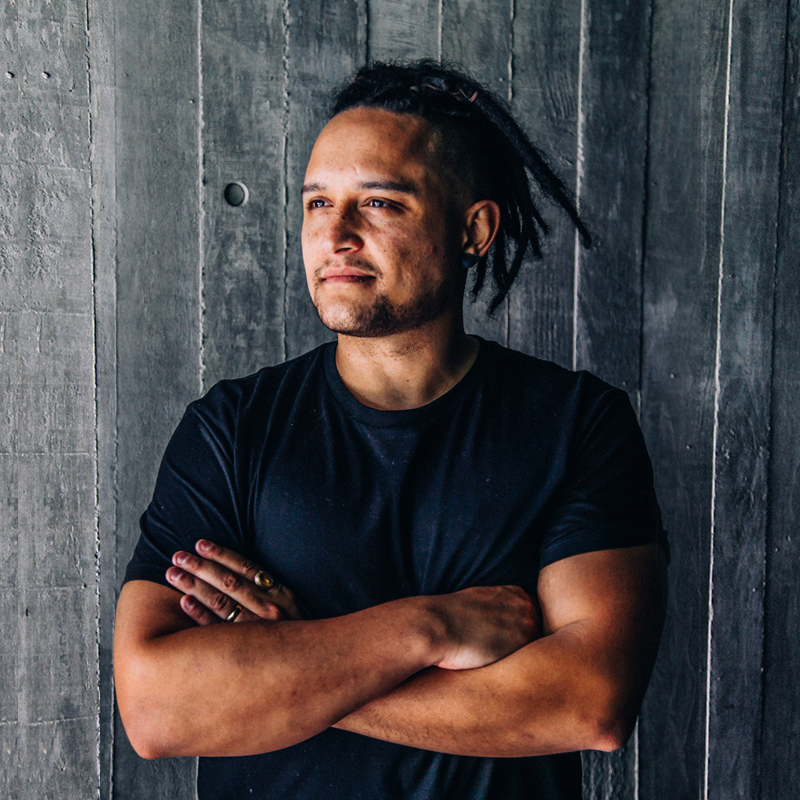

Background information
- Also known as: Mt. Eden Dubstep
- Born: Jesse Cooper
- Origin: Auckland, New Zealand
- Genres: Dubstep, EDM, electro house, drumstep, progressive house
- Years active: 2008–present
- Label: Ultra Music
- Website: www.mtedenofficial.com

Jesse Cooper, known under the pseudonym Mt Eden (and formerly Mt Eden Dubstep), is a New Zealand electronic musician based in Auckland. Popular tracks include "Sierra Leone" – a remix of Freshlyground's "I'd Like" – and remixes of Delerium's "Silence" as well as Lisa Miskovsky's "Still Alive".

Mt Eden began gaining popularity following the 2009 release of Sierra Leone, which went viral on YouTube. Mt Eden currently has 146 million combined video views and over 261 thousand subscribers on the act's YouTube channel, as well as more than 291 663 "likes" on Facebook.

== History ==
=== Background and beginnings ===
Jesse Cooper started making mixtapes under the moniker "Jay Fresh" on the weekends. In the beginning Cooper mostly made hip hop mixes with his friends, one of which was Harley Rayner, the son of former Split Enz keyboardist Eddie Rayner. In 2008, Cooper decided to make dubstep music after he heard Electronic musicians Benga and Skream, at the New Zealand music festivals Phat09 and Splore, saying that he had his "mind blown" by the young genre. He also started making drum and bass music around the same time, which was inspired by the Front Left Speaker Crew and Joe Hockley.

One of the first songs Mt Eden made public was "Sierra Leone", a remix of Freshlyground's "I'd Like", which he uploaded and posted on his Myspace page, however the song gained major recognition after a fan posted the track on YouTube.

In 2008, Cooper's girlfriend's little brother suggested he make a YouTube page for himself to post music on. He called the page "MtEdenDnB08" because he lived in Mt Eden. That was when Cooper decided to release music under the pseudonym "Mt Eden Dubstep", later changing his name to simply "Mt Eden" in 2010, when Cooper recruited Rayner. Mt Eden released their first extended play (EP) MEDS for digital download on 7 December 2010. It has got mostly positive reviews by customers on iTunes.

On 16 February 2013, Mt Eden announced upcoming releases in a post on their Facebook page, writing: "[...] Our Sierra Leone Remix package (Sierra Leone Reinvented + Remixes, Sierra Leone music video) is coming in April. The first single off No Mans Land is "Airwalker", to be released late April/early May, with the full Walking on Air EP out in late May. No Mans Land LP will [drop] in June."

The EP Sierra Leone (feat. Freshlyground) [Remixes] was released on 30 April 2013, with a completely re-made version of their original "Sierra Leone" and three remixes of the same song by Ta-ku, AraabMuzik and Tommie Sunshine with Live City (in 2017, two more remixes followed, by TWO OWLS and Ian Munro respectively). The duo's Walking on Air EP was released in June 2013, featuring seven songs, by Ultra Records Label.
