= Young Blood (Bea Miller song) =

- Remixes EP cover

Single by Bea Miller

from the EP Young Blood
- Released: June 30, 2014
- Recorded: 2013–2014
- Genre: Pop
- Length: 3:39
- Label: Hollywood; Syco
- Songwriters: Bea Miller; Matt Parad; Mike Del Rio; Phoebe Ryan
- Producer: Mike Del Rio

Bea Miller singles chronology
"Young Blood" (2014)	"Fire n Gold" (2015)

Music video
- "Young Blood" on YouTube

"Young Blood" is the debut single by American singer Bea Miller. It serves as the lead single from her debut EP Young Blood, through Hollywood Records and Syco Music.

== Background ==
After placing ninth on the second season of The X Factor US, Bea Miller signed a record deal with Hollywood Records and Simon Cowell's Syco Music in January 2013, and subsequently started working on new songs.

Bea described this song as having "darkness and light within it, which I think is really cool and representative of kids. We’re the future, and we can do whatever we want because someday this world will be ours. Literally, it will be because we will be the adults who are in charge some day." She came up with that philosophy from "a long time I was kind of a glass-half-empty type of person. I went through a hard time. I started to compare myself to my friends, what they were doing compared to what I was doing. I realized eventually that it’s not healthy to think so negatively, that there is a positive side.

Life is not going from bad to good, but it’s a balance of the two that kind of goes up and down. There are bad things and there are good things. I thought it would be good to bring that into music because I realized that I’m not the only one who feels that way, that a lot of teenagers especially feel that way. Like the weight of the world is on their shoulders, and I wanted to be able to express that so that teenagers could relate to it and realize they’re not alone."

In 2015, the song received a Radio Disney Music Award for "Best Song to Rock Out to With your BFFs".

== Promotion ==
Miller performed the song for the first time on television on December 17, 2014, on Today where she was introduced as Elvis Duran's "Artist of the Month." She sang "Young Blood" in various gigs and radio stations across the US, such as On Air with Ryan Seacrest' and The Kidd Kraddick Morning Show. Miller performed the song on the Demi World Tour in which she served as the opening act in select tour dates. The song was used in an episode of American Idol.

== Music video ==
The music video for "Young Blood" was uploaded to Miller's official Vevo account on July 21, 2014. It was directed by Mark Pellington. She described it as "very dark, but, like I said with the actual song, it’s kind of a balance of light and dark. It's weird. There’s a lot of jump cuts and quick movements but there are also slow moments. It has kids laughing and then kids screaming and crying... it's kind of a balance all of these emotions." Speaking to MTV News about the video, she said "I wanted the video for Young Blood to be really dark. I wanted the whole thing to revolve around nighttime, I didn't want any daylight. Originally, the director wanted at the end of the video to be a sunrise, but I was like 'no, that's corny,' that just means dark turns to light. And dark doesn't necessarily always turns to light. It can be dark for a long time, and then will be light, then will be dark again. I'm not just gonna have that message that everyone has of like 'I know you're down in the dumps, but you'll get up and stay up. Don't you worry.' Because it's not true, you can be up and down."

== Track listings ==
- Digital download
1. "Young Blood" – 3:39

== Charts ==
Chart (2014–15)	Peak position
US Pop Airplay (Billboard)	40
US Dance Club Songs (Billboard)	4
US Bubbling Under Hot 100 (Billboard)	5

== Awards and nominations ==
Year	Award	Category	Work	Result	Ref.
2015	Radio Disney Music Awards	Best Song to Rock Out to with Your BFFs	"Young Blood"	Won	

== Release history ==
Region	Date	Format	Label	Ref.
United States	April 22, 2014	Digital download	Hollywood	
United States	September 23, 2014	Mainstream airplay	Hollywood	
