= Fire n Gold =

Single by Bea Miller

from the album Not an Apology
- Released: April 28, 2015
- Recorded: 2013–2014
- Genre: Pop rock
- Length: 3:31
- Label: Hollywood; Syco
- Songwriters: Freddy Wexler; Nolan Sipe; Jarrad Rogers
- Producer: Jarrad Rogers

Bea Miller singles chronology
"Young Blood" (2014)	"Fire n Gold" (2015)	"Force of Nature" (2015)

Music video
- "Fire N Gold on YouTube

"Fire n Gold" is a song by American singer Bea Miller. It was released through Hollywood Records and Syco Music as the lead single from her debut album Not an Apology on April 28, 2015. The track was produced by Jarrad Rogers and written by Rogers, Freddy Wexler and Nolan Sipe.

The song was certified Gold in the United States by the Recording Industry Association of America (RIAA), having sold over 500,000 copies.

== Background ==
After placing ninth on the second season of The X Factor US, Bea Miller signed a record deal with Hollywood Records and Simon Cowell's Syco Music in January 2013, and subsequently started working on new songs.

== Promotion ==
The song has been used for promos for ABC Family shows such as The Fosters and Switched at Birth. It was also used for Netflix shows' commercials. Additionally, it was prominently used as the theme music for ESPN's coverage of the 2015 NCAA Division I women's basketball tournament. Miller performed the song live on the Today Show on May 12, 2015.

== Commercial performance ==
In the first week of August 2015, the song debuted at No. 78 on the Billboard Hot 100, making it her first song to chart. It previously had reached No. 17 on the Bubbling Under Hot 100 Singles chart.

== Music video ==
The music video for "Fire n Gold" was filmed in March 2015. It was uploaded to Miller's official Vevo account on May 20, 2015. It was directed by Black Coffee. The video shows Miller lying on bed covered in polaroid photos before her friends emerge from the background shadows and dance with her. Miller said about the song, "It's reminding all the people who are really down in the dumps and who feel like they're alienated and like no one understands them and they're really alone that they do have a purpose in life and that they are here for a reason."

== Track listing ==
- Digital download
1. "Fire n Gold" – 3:32

== Charts ==
Chart (2015)	Peak position
US Billboard Hot 100	78
US Digital Song Sales (Billboard)	31

== Certifications ==
Region	Certification	Certified units/sales
United States (RIAA)	Gold	500,000^{‡}
^{‡} Sales+streaming figures based on certification alone.

== Release history ==
Region	Date	Format	Label
United States	April 22, 2014	Digital download	Hollywood
