= Skizzy Mars =

American rapper

- Also known as: Skizzy Mars
- Born: Myles Mills; June 8, 1993 (age 33); Harlem, New York, United States
- Genre: Hip hop
- Occupations: Rapper; songwriter; record producer
- Instrument: Vocals
- Years active: 2011–present
- Labels: Atlantic; APG; PHM

Myles Mills (born June 8, 1993), better known by his stage name Skizzy Mars, is an American rapper, songwriter, and record producer from Harlem, New York.

== Early life ==
Mills was born and raised in Harlem, New York to his father, a therapist, and his mother, who operated two daycare centers in Manhattan. He attended an all-boys school St. Bernard's School during his elementary years and later graduated from the Browning School. Mills attended Union College to originally pursue a sports journalism major, but he dropped out ten weeks after starting classes to begin his rapping career.

== Discography ==
=== Studio albums ===
List of studio albums, with selected details
Title	Album details	Peak chart positions
Title	Album details	US
Alone Together	Released: April 8, 2016; Label: PHM; Format: CD and Digital download	50
Free Skizzy Mars	Released: July 26, 2019; Format: Digital download	—
Fun & Problems	Released: June 25, 2021; Label: Kingmaker Records; Format: Digital download	—

=== Extended plays ===
List of extended plays, with selected details
Title	Extended play details	Peak chart positions
Title	Extended play details	US
The Red Balloon Project	Released: February 3, 2015; Label: PHM; Format: CD and digital download	35
Are You Ok?	Released: April 13, 2018; Label: Kingmaker/Please Rewind; Format: Digital download	—

=== Mixtapes ===
List of mixtapes, with selected details
Title	Mixtape details
Kindered Spirit	Released: March 13, 2012; Format: YouTube
American Psycho	Released: March 14, 2012; Format: YouTube
Phases	Released: March 26, 2013; Format: Digital download
Pace	Released: March 4, 2014; Format: Digital download

=== Singles ===
==== As lead artist ====
Title	Year
"Make Sense"	2014
"All Say"	2014
"Wrinkled Sheets"	2021
"Problems Too"	2022
"criminals - Remix" (with Bazio)	2022

==== As featured artist ====
Title	Year	Peak chart positions	
Title	Year	CZE	SVK
"Used to Be the S**t" (Miniature Tigers featuring Skizzy Mars)	2014	—	—
"We Go Back (Jarami Remix)" (Chinah featuring Skizzy Mars)	2014	—	—
"Steady 1234" (DJ Vice featuring Jasmine Thompson and Skizzy Mars)	2016	71	83

=== Music videos ===
Year	Title
2013	"Pay for You" (Skizzy Mars featuring G-Eazy)
2013	"Cheer Up"
2014	"Make Sense"
2015	"Do You There" (Skizzy Mars featuring Marc E. Bassy)
2016	"I'm Ready" (Skizzy Mars featuring Olivver the Kid)
2018	"American Dream"
2019	"Bayside" (featuring 24kGoldn)
