= Freddy Wexler =

American singer-songwriter

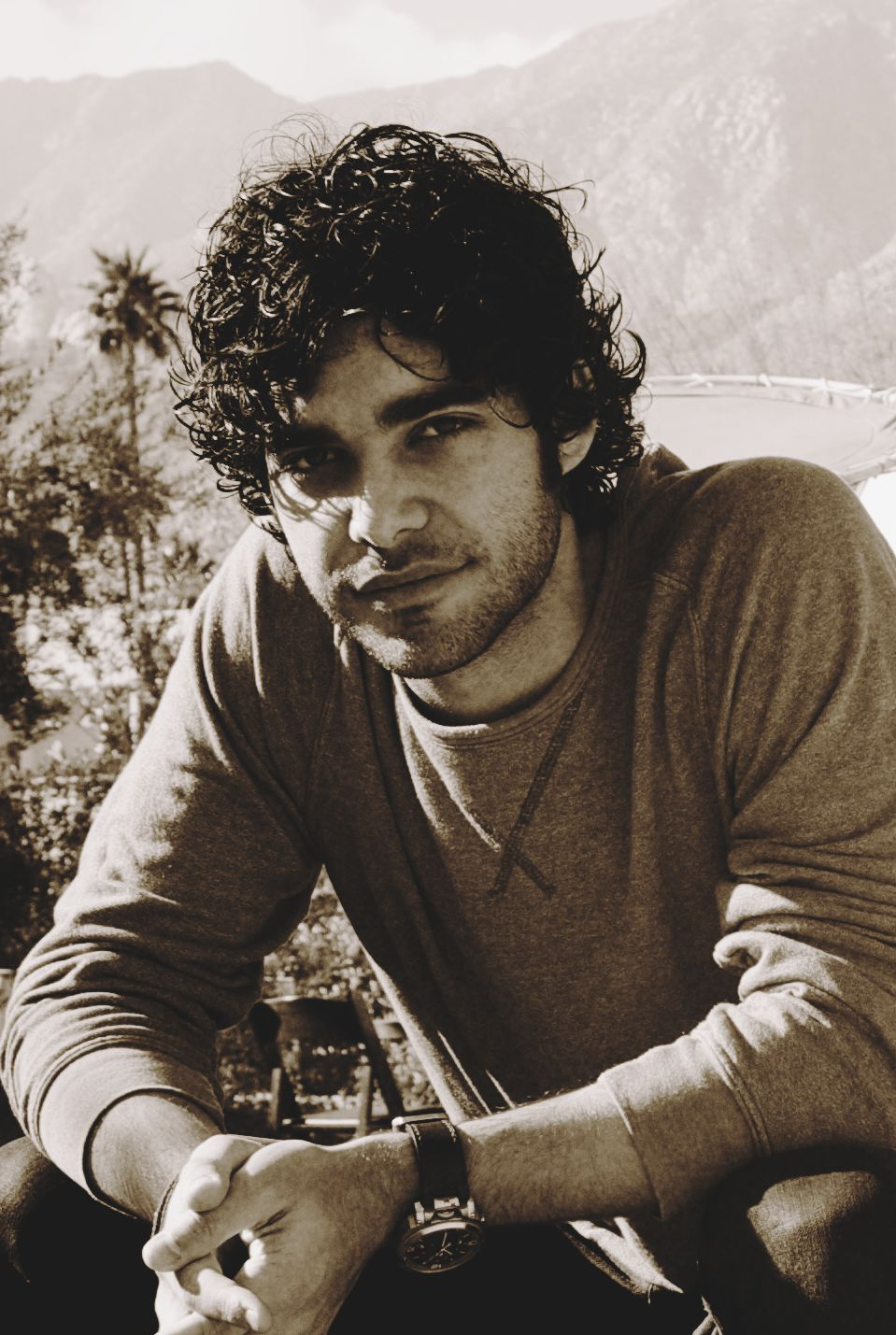
- Freddy Wexler in Palm Springs CA, 2012

Background information
- Origin: New York City, U.S.
- Occupations: Producer, songwriter
- Years active: 2007–present
- Label: The Brain Music
- Website: freddywexler.com

Freddy Wexler is an American songwriter and producer. He is based in Los Angeles, California. Wexler began working as a professional musician in 2006, and is known for co-writing Billy Joel’s "Turn the Lights Back On", and the Justin Bieber and Ariana Grande song "Stuck with U". Since then he has expanded to working in film and television. Wexler has producing and directing credits on the NFL documentary Unfinished Business and Nickelodeon's animated series Kid Cowboy, and has contributed original songs to the soundtrack of Emily in Paris.

== Early life, personal life and education ==
Freddy Wexler grew up in New York City, where he learned to play piano by watching his mother play for cancer patients at the Memorial Sloan Kettering Cancer Center. He began writing songs at age 13. Wexler studied English at the University of Pennsylvania.

Wexler is married to Olivia Wexler, a music executive.

== Career ==
=== Music ===
During an internship at Sony Music, Wexler enrolled in a music industry class at New York University (NYU). During this period, he met Stefani Germonatta, later known as Lady Gaga, in his NYU class. After hearing her perform, Wexler recorded her demo tape in his parents' apartment building laundry room. He made an impromptu appearance at a meeting of Sony executives in the Sony Building on Madison Avenue to advocate for her signing, calling her "the next Madonna". Sony sent representatives to watch her perform at The Bitter End, but they ultimately did not sign her.

In 2006, Wexler signed a record deal with Virgin Records. Some of Wexler's early music was featured on the television series Dancing with the Stars and The Bachelorette. He performed at several venues in summer 2008, including Warped Tour in Dallas, opening for Good Charlotte at the House of Blues, and headlining the July 4th celebration at Toyota Stadium, then Pizza Hut Park.

His music gained exposure through Dallas radio DJ Kidd Kraddick's morning show. He was featured on Kraddick's "Music that Makes You Cooler" segment and then completed a five-day tour from Philadelphia to Dallas. After being loaned a truck and piano by Kraddick, and having his tour documented by a volunteer film director, Wexler concluded his Dallas show by requesting help from Kraddick and the morning show to record his album. Over 50,000 listeners voted in an online poll, with 94% supporting Kraddick helping Wexler record an album.

Wexler returned to the University of Pennsylvania to finish his senior year of college. There, he met pianist Eric Wortham. After signing a management agreement with Wortham, Wexler facilitated Wortham's eventual position as Adele's pianist. Wexler signed Rachel Platten as a management client in 2009, leading to her first Billboard-charting hit "1,000 Ships".

After moving to Los Angeles, Wexler founded a music management company called The Brain Music in 2012. He also created The Brain House, an "experimental songwriting collective" in the Hollywood Hills, where he invited a group of writers, musicians, and artists to live and work together. The arrangement allowed members to stay in exchange for publishing rights to songs created in the house. The Brain produced work for artists including Jill Scott, Demi Lovato, Shakira, and Selena Gomez. Wexler earned writing credits on songs including "Slow Down" by Selena Gomez, "Be Kind" by Halsey and Marshmello, "Wolves" by Kanye West, "Novacane" by Lil Wayne, "Fire N Gold" by Bea Miller, and "Perfect Goodbye" by Celine Dion.

In 2017, Wexler began releasing his own music under the pseudonym Jackson Penn, without major promotion or label backing. His Penn releases included the songs "My Girl" and "Streetlights on Mars", with the latter reaching number 16 on Spotify's global chart. Wexler described Penn as an idealized version of himself that helped him reconnect with his own artistic voice after years of writing for others.

Wexler cowrote the single "Stuck with U" by Justin Bieber and Ariana Grande, which hit #1 on the Billboard Hot 100 chart and raised over $5.5 million for charity. Proceeds from the song benefited families of COVID-19 first responders.

In 2020, he signed an administration agreement with Sony Music Publishing.

As of 2025, Wexler has collaborated with artists including BlackPink, Post Malone, Pink, Laufey, Diana Ross, Zayn Malik, Steve Aoki, and Wyclef Jean. He co-wrote the Golden Globe-nominated Robbie William song "Forbidden Road" for the soundtrack of Williams’ film, Better Man. He was also commissioned to write original music for Emily in Paris season two by series creator Darren Star, including "Mon Soleil" and "Beautiful Ruins". His record label, the Freddy Wexler Company, released the show's soundtrack.

==== Collaboration with Billy Joel ====
Wexler played a role in Billy Joel's return to recording after a 17-year hiatus. He began collaborating with Joel through an introduction arranged by his wife Olivia via a mutual connection with a doctor. Wexler met Joel at Dockside Restaurant in Long Island, New York. Their initial meeting extended from a planned 10 minutes to two hours, during which they discussed songwriting approaches and unfinished works. Wexler's Penn songs played a role in his connection with Billy Joel, who praised them as sounding like Lennon-McCartney compositions during their first meeting. Following this meeting, Joel shared some of his unfinished songs with Wexler.

Wexler moved his family to Long Island for a time to work more closely with Joel. Their collaboration led to the creation of "Turn the Lights Back On" (2024), which Wexler co-wrote with Arthur Bacon and Wayne Hector. The song was recorded at Boathouse Studios in Water Mill, New York, and released on February 1, 2024. It debuted at number 1 on both classic hits and classic rock radio charts, reached number 2 on iTunes, and entered the Billboard Hot 100 at number 62. Wexler conceived and co-directed the song's music video. Joel also hired Wexler's company to manage the song's release.

=== Television, film, and theater ===
Wexler co-produced and co-directed Unfinished Business, an NFL feature film about Keith Adams and the Riverside Cubs, an all-deaf high school football championship team, and was producing a related feature film for MGM's Orion Pictures after acquiring the exclusive life rights to the Adams family story.

In 2021, Variety reported that Wexler was the producer on the Westbrook Studios film Soul Superhero. The next year, The Hollywood Reporter reported that he was the producer and co-writer for a film from Walt Disney Pictures called Grace.

Wexler created Nickelodeon’s first YouTube original series, Kid Cowboy, which released in January 2025. He also served as one of the principal composers alongside co-executive producer Emilio Estefan. He co-produced the 2025 Broadway adaptation of the musical The Last Five Years, and was an executive producer on Sebastian Maniscalco's 2025 Hulu comedy special It Ain't Right.

== Awards and recognition ==
- 64th Annual Grammy Awards Nominee – Album of the Year – Justice (Triple Chucks Deluxe) by Justin Bieber – 2022
- Webby Award - Turn the Lights Back On music video - Director - 2024
- 82nd Annual Golden Globe Awards Nominee - Best Original Song - "Forbidden Road" 2024.
- Clio Silver Award – Turn the Lights Back On – 2025

== Discography ==
Discography
Year	Artist	Song	Album	Record label	Notes	Ref.
2011	Lil Wayne	Novacane (ft. Kevin Rudolf)	Tha Carter IV	Cash Money Records	No.1 on Billboard 200; RIAA: 5× Platinum	
2012	Bridgit Mendler	City Lights	Hello My Name Is...	Hollywood Records		
2012	Bridgit Mendler	Top of the World	Hello My Name Is...	Hollywood Records		
2012	Bridgit Mendler	Love’ll Tell Us Where to Go	Hello My Name Is...	Hollywood Records		
2012	Bridgit Mendler	Quicksand	Hello My Name Is...	Hollywood Records		
2012	Bridgit Mendler	Hold on for Dear Love	Hello My Name Is...	Hollywood Records		
2013	Selena Gomez	Slow Down	Stars Dance	Hollywood Records	RIAA: 2× Platinum	
2013	Demi Lovato	Without the Love	Demi	Hollywood Records	RIAA: 2× Platinum	
2013	Moxie Raia	Buffalo Bill	Non-album single	Capitol Records		
2014	Tiesto	Footprints (All Over the World)	A Town Called Paradise	Republic Records		
2014	Charles Perry	Stranger to Love	Non-album single	Verve Records		
2015	Bea Miller	Fire n Gold	Not an Apology	Hollywood Records	RIAA: 1× Platinum	
2015	Prince Royce	Lie to Me	Double Vision	Sony Music Entertainment	RIAA: 2x Latin Platinum	
2015	Steve Aoki & Moxie Raia	I Love it When You Cry (Moxoki)	Neon Future II	Ultra Records	Album debuted No.2 on Billboard Top Dance/Electronic Albums	
2015	Martin Garrix	Break Through the Silence	Break Through the Silence (EP)	Spinnin Records		
2016	Kanye West	Wolves	The Life of Pablo	GOOD Music	RIAA: 3× Platinum; Album debuted No.1 on Billboard 200	
2016	Moxie Raia	On My Mind (ft. Pusha T)	931 Reloaded	Def Jam Recordings		
2018	Zayn Malik	Talk to Me	Icarus Falls	RCA Records	RIAA: Gold	
2018	DNCE	Lose My Cool	People to People (EP)	Republic Records		
2018	The Spencer Lee Band	The Wolf	Fifty Shades Freed (Original Motion Picture Soundtrack)	Republic Records		
2018	The Spencer Lee Band	Kissing Tree	The Spencer Lee Band EP	Independent		
2018	Jackson Penn	California	Non-album single	The Brain		
2018	Jackson Penn	Babylon	Non-album single	The Brain		
2019	Jonas Brothers	Like It's Christmas	Non-album single	Republic Records	3 weeks at Billboard Hot AC No. 1; RIAA: 1× Platinum	
2019	Celine Dion	Perfect Goodbye	Courage	Sony Music Entertainment	No.1 Billboard 200	
2019	Pink	My Attic	Hurts 2B Human	RCA Records	Album debuted at No. 1 on Billboard 200	
2019	Jackson Penn	Sick in the Head	Non-album single	The Brain		
2019	Jackson Penn	My Girl	Non-album single	The Brain		
2020	Justin Bieber & Ariana Grande	Stuck With U	Non-album single	Republic Records	Album debuted at No. 1 on Billboard Hot 100; No. 1 on Digital Song Sales	
2020	Halsey & Marshmello	Be Kind	Collabs (EP)	Joytime Collective	RIAA: 2× Platinum	
2020	Halsey & Marshmello	Manic (Deluxe)	Collabs (EP)	Joytime Collective	RIAA: 2× Platinum	
2020	Jackson Penn	After All	Non-album single	The Brain		
2021	Justin Bieber	2 Much	Justice	RBMG Records	RIAA: 2× Platinum; No.1 Billboard 200	
2021	Ashley Park	Mon Soleil	Emily In Paris Season 3 (Soundtrack from the Netflix Series)	Milan Records		
2021	Diana Ross	Just in Case	Thank You	Decca Records	Grammy nominee, Best Traditional Pop Vocal Album	
2021	Majid Jordan	Summer Rain	Wildest Dreams	OVO Sound		
2022	Blackpink	Hard to Love	Born Pink	Interscope Records	No.1 Billboard 200	
2023	Laufey	Must Be Love	Bewitched	AWAL	66th Annual Grammy Awards winner, Best Traditional Pop Vocal Album; No. 1, Billboard Jazz Albums chart; No. 1, Billboard Traditional Jazz Album chart; No. 1 Billboard Jazz chart; Debuted at No. 23 on Billboard 200	
2023	Billy Joel	Turn the Lights Back On	Non-album single	Columbia Records		
2024	Ashley Park	Ruins	Emily in Paris Season 4 (Soundtrack from the Netflix Series)	Republic Records/The Freddy Wexler Company		
2024	Rosé	Too Bad for Us	Rosie	Atlantic Records	Debuted at No.3 on Billboard 200	
2024	Robbie Williams	Forbidden Road	Better Man (Original Motion Picture Soundtrack)	Sony Music Entertainment		

== Bibliography ==
- Wexler, Freddy (October 24, 2024). Everett Green: The Not-So-Christmas Tree. Penguin Random House. ISBN 9780593567944.
