= Chinah =

Denmark English-language band

CHINAH
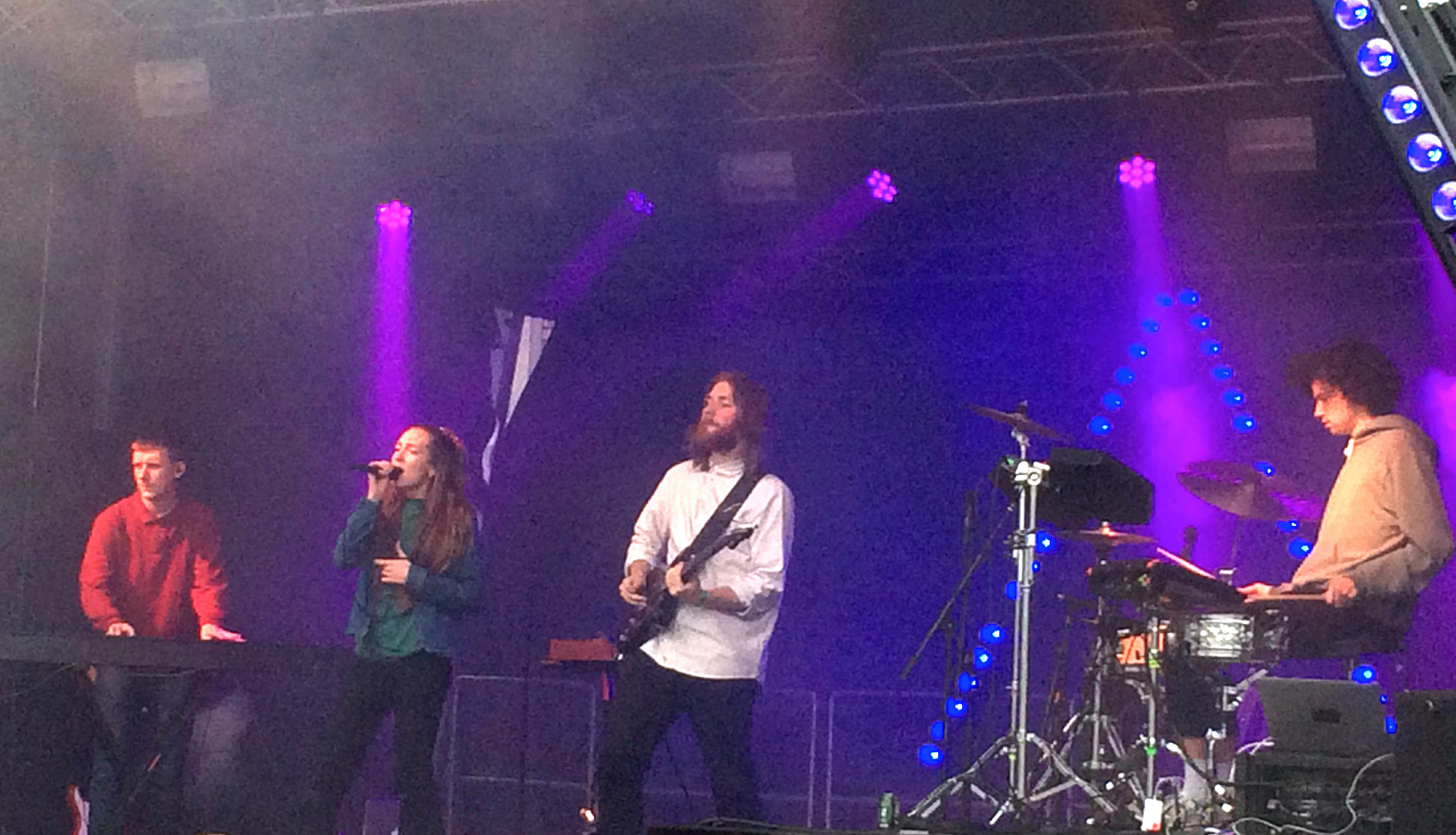
- Chinah performing in 2017

Background information
- Origin: Copenhagen, Denmark
- Genres: Electronic; PBR&B; Ambient
- Years active: 2014–present
- Labels: No3
- Members: Fine Glindvad; Simon Kjær; Simon Andersson

CHINAH is a three-member, English-language band from Copenhagen, Denmark. The group has backgrounds in folk, contemporary classical, and electronica music. Its members are singer and songwriter Fine Glindvad Jensen, guitarist Simon Kjær Lauridsen and electronic musician and pianist Simon Lars Gustav Andersson. CHINAH released their debut single "Away from Me" in July 2015.

== History ==
The group was founded in 2014 under the band name "Fine Glindvad" and included singer and songwriter Fine Glindvad, guitarist Simon Kjær and electronic musician and pianist Simon Andersson. Their music had a strong folk influence, with a focus on poetry and melody. The group later moved into an electronic, song focused style containing minimalist beats, synthesizers and guitar passages.

In May 2015, the group emerged as "CHINAH" and debuted at the SPOT Festival - a festival showcasing up-and-coming Danish and Nordic music. There, the group's "contemplative gourmet pop" music style was described as "organic guitar, hard-hitting synths, and wistful vocals". On 7 July 2015, CHINAH released their debut single, "Away from Me". The song, which was written in early Spring 2014, was the first release from their debut 5-track EP. On 27 August 2015, CHINAH released "We Go Back", their second single from their debut EP.

In February 2016 they released the EP Once The Lights Are On. In January 2017 they released the single "Even Love" from their next EP Hints.

In November 2018, CHINAH released their debut album ANYONE, following the release of three singles from the album, Real Thing?, Strange Is Better and Yeah Right.

In March 2021, CHINAH released their second album Feels Like Forever, following the release of three singles from the album, Promise, Mysterious, and What I've Become.

== Discography ==
=== Albums ===
Title
Album details
Track listing
Reviews
ANYONE
- Released: November 9, 2018
- Label: No3
- Formats: Vinyl, digital download
- Length: 41:40
1. "Anyone" - 3:46
2. "Drown Me" - 2:59
3. "Strange Is Better" - 4:00
4. "Everything Is New" - 2:32
5. "Give Me Life" - 2:49
6. "Real Thing?" - 4:04
7. "Yeah Right" - 4:10
8. "Adrenaline" - 2:37
9. "Monster Sirens" - 3:19
10. "Obsessed" - 2:54
11. "Simple" - 2:05
12. "Nowhere" - 6:25

Professional ratings
Review scores
Source	Rating
Soundvenue	5/6 stars
Gaffa	3/6 stars

Feels Like Forever
- Released: March 19, 2021
- Label: CHINAH / The Orchard
- Formats: digital download
- Length: 29:36
1. "Eternal Blue" - 1:40
2. "Seconds of Heaven" - 3:46
3. "Promise" - 3:08
4. "Tailor" - 1:00
5. "What I've Become" - 4:19
6. "Feels Like Forever" - 2:12
7. "Mysterious" - 2:46
8. "Ideal" - 3:29
9. "Someday" - 2:22
10. "Shine" - 4:49

Professional ratings
Review scores
Source	Rating
Soundvenue	5/6 stars
Gaffa	4/6 stars
bandsoftomorrow	4/5 stars

=== Extended plays ===
Title
Album details
Track listing
Reviews
Once the Lights Are On
- Released: February 11, 2016
- Label: No3
- Formats: CD, digital download
- Length: 24:51
1. "We Go Back" - 5:11
2. "Colder" - 3:59
3. "Away From Me" - 3:56
4. "Never The Same" - 3:25
5. "Minds" - 4:10
6. "If You Can Feel This" - 4:11

Professional ratings
Review scores
Source	Rating
Soundvenue	5/6 stars
Gaffa	5/6 stars

Hints
- Released: March 10, 2017
- Label: No3
- Formats: CD, digital download
- Length: 22:37
1. "The Space Another Made" - 2:07
2. "All Your Words" - 5:04
3. "Can't Remember How It Feels" - 3:34
4. "Can't Remember How It Feels (Interlude)" - 1:02
5. "If I Stay" - 3:46
6. "Young" - 3:38
7. "Even Love" - 3:31

Professional ratings
Review scores
Source	Rating
Soundvenue	4/6 stars
Gaffa	4/6 stars

=== Singles ===
Title	Year	Album/EP
"Away from Me"	2015	Once the Lights Are On
"We Go Back"	2015	Once the Lights Are On
"Minds"	2015	Once the Lights Are On
"Colder"	2016	Once the Lights Are On
"Can't Remember How It Feels"	2016	Hints
"Even Love"	2017	Hints
"Year Right"	2018	ANYONE
"Strange Is Better"	2018	ANYONE
"Real Thing?"	2018	ANYONE
"Give Me Life - A COLORS SHOW"	2019	
"Promise"	2020	Feels Like Forever
"Mysterious"	2021	Feels Like Forever
"What I've Become"	2021	Feels Like Forever
