= List of songs recorded by Sigrid =

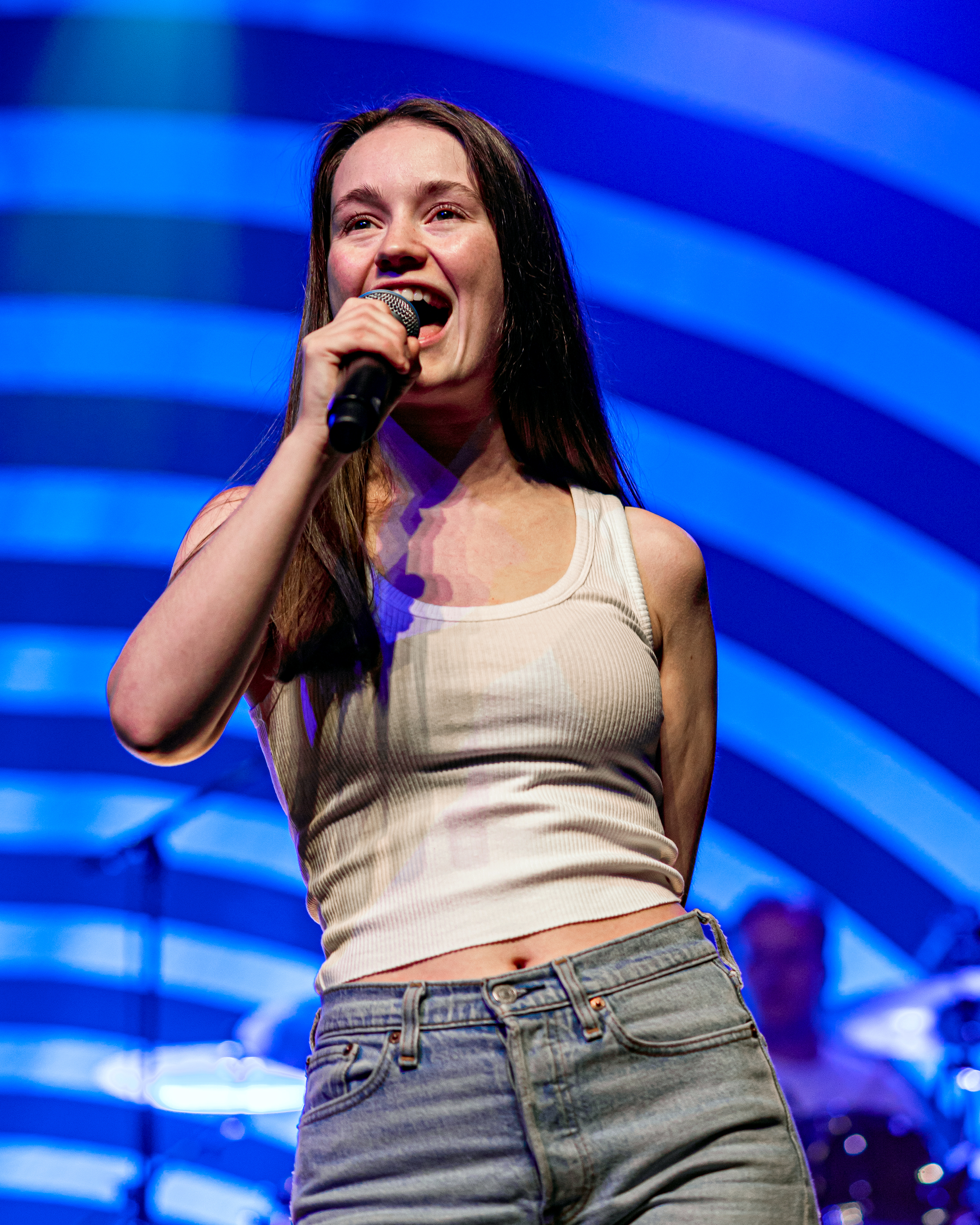
Sigrid performing at The Fonda Theatre in April 2022

Norwegian singer-songwriter Sigrid has recorded material for two studio albums and three extended plays (EP). She has also collaborated with other artists and covered songs by others. After being encouraged by her brother, Tellef Raabe, to write her own songs, Sigrid wrote and released her first song "Sun" in 2013. The song received airplay on Norwegian radio stations and was featured on Norwegian state television NRK's show Urørt. In 2014, Sigrid signed a record deal with Petroleum Records. After graduating from high school, she moved to Bergen to pursue a career in music. Tellef featured Sigrid on two songs on his EP Idiographic (2016).

By 2016, various British record labels sought to sign Sigrid and she joined Island Records. The label released "Don't Kill My Vibe" as Sigrid's debut single in February 2017. She co-wrote it with Martin Sjølie and it was the first single off her debut EP, Don't Kill My Vibe (2017). Aside from Sjølie, Sigrid worked with Askjell, and George and Harry Flint on the EP. Sigrid's second EP, Raw, followed in 2018. She co-wrote the single "High Five" alongside Sjølie and Emily Warren. Sigrid was the sole writer and producer of the track "Focus (Demo)". Sucker Punch was released as Sigrid's debut album in 2019. It encompasses the electropop and synth-pop genres. Together with previous collaborators, she worked on it with other songwriters such as Noonie Bao, who co-wrote "Business Dinners" and "Never Mine", and Oscar Holter, who co-wrote and produced the single "Don't Feel Like Crying".

In 2020, Sigrid appeared on the charity single "Times Like These" as part of Live Lounge Allstars. For her second studio album, How to Let Go (2022), Sigrid "expand[ed] her shimmering synth-pop sound" without hesitance, according to NME's Nick Levine. On the record, she mostly worked with Caroline Ailin and Sylvester Sivertsen, with the latter producing all but one song. Sigrid worked again with Sjølie, who co-wrote and produced "Mistake Like You", and Warren, who contributed to three songs, including the album's lead single "Mirror". Sigrid collaborated with Bring Me the Horizon and Griff on the 2022 tracks "Bad Life" and "Head on Fire", respectively. Her third EP, The Hype (2023), was supported by the single "The Hype" which Sigrid co-wrote and co-produced with Nick Hahn.

== Songs ==
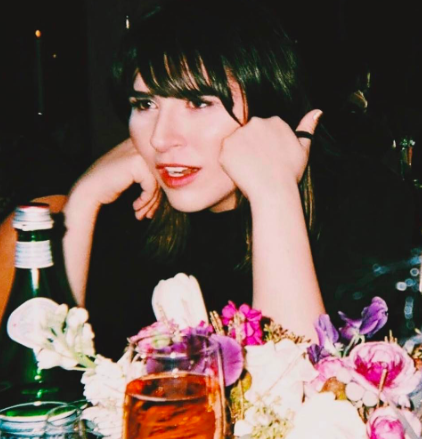
Emily Warren has co-written eight of Sigrid's songs.

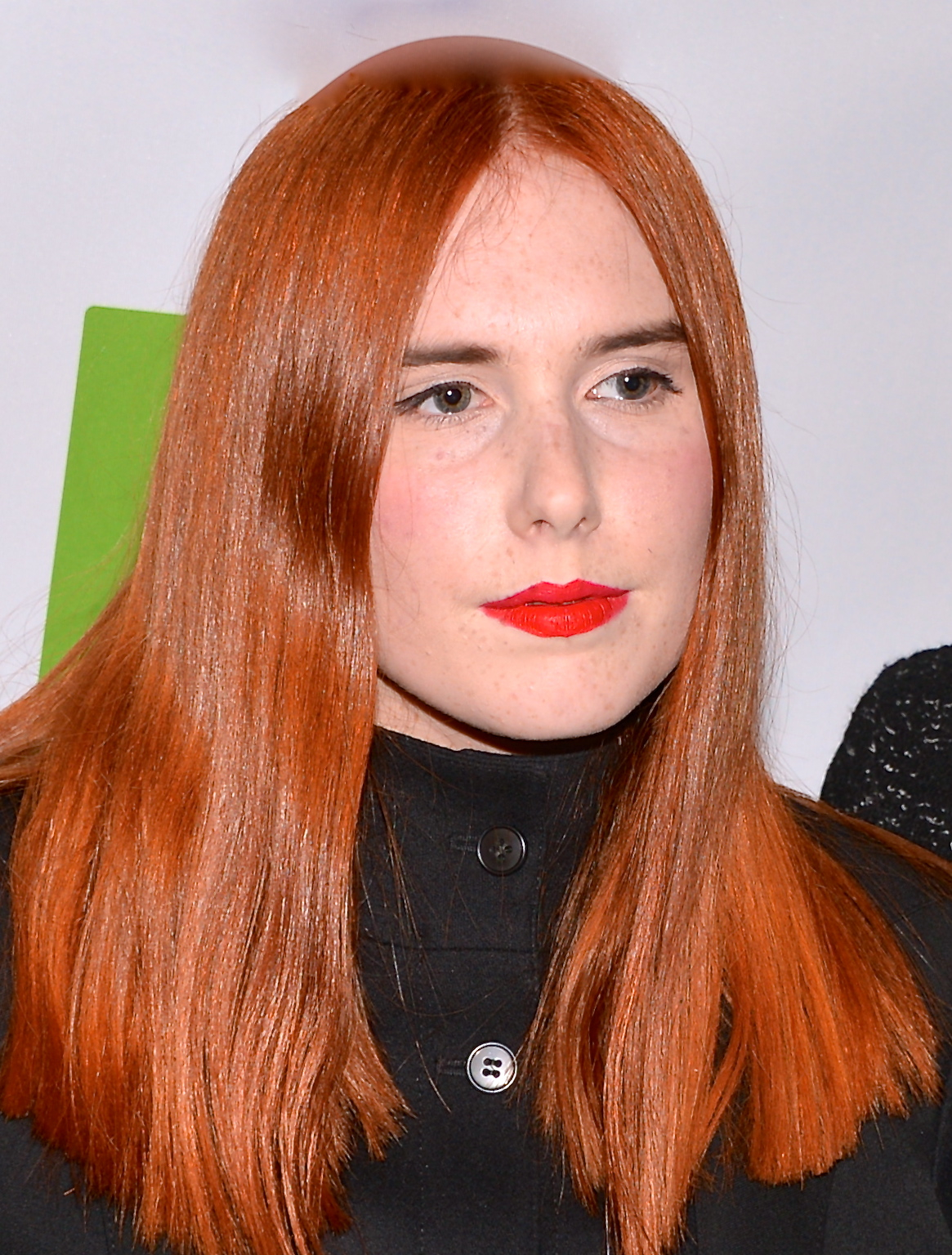
Noonie Bao co-wrote "Business Dinners" and "Never Mine".

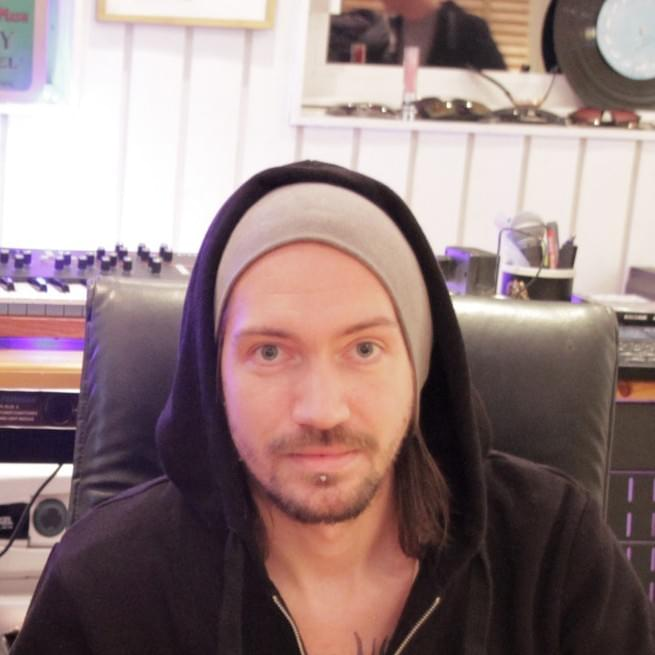
Oscar Holter co-wrote and produced "Don't Feel Like Crying".

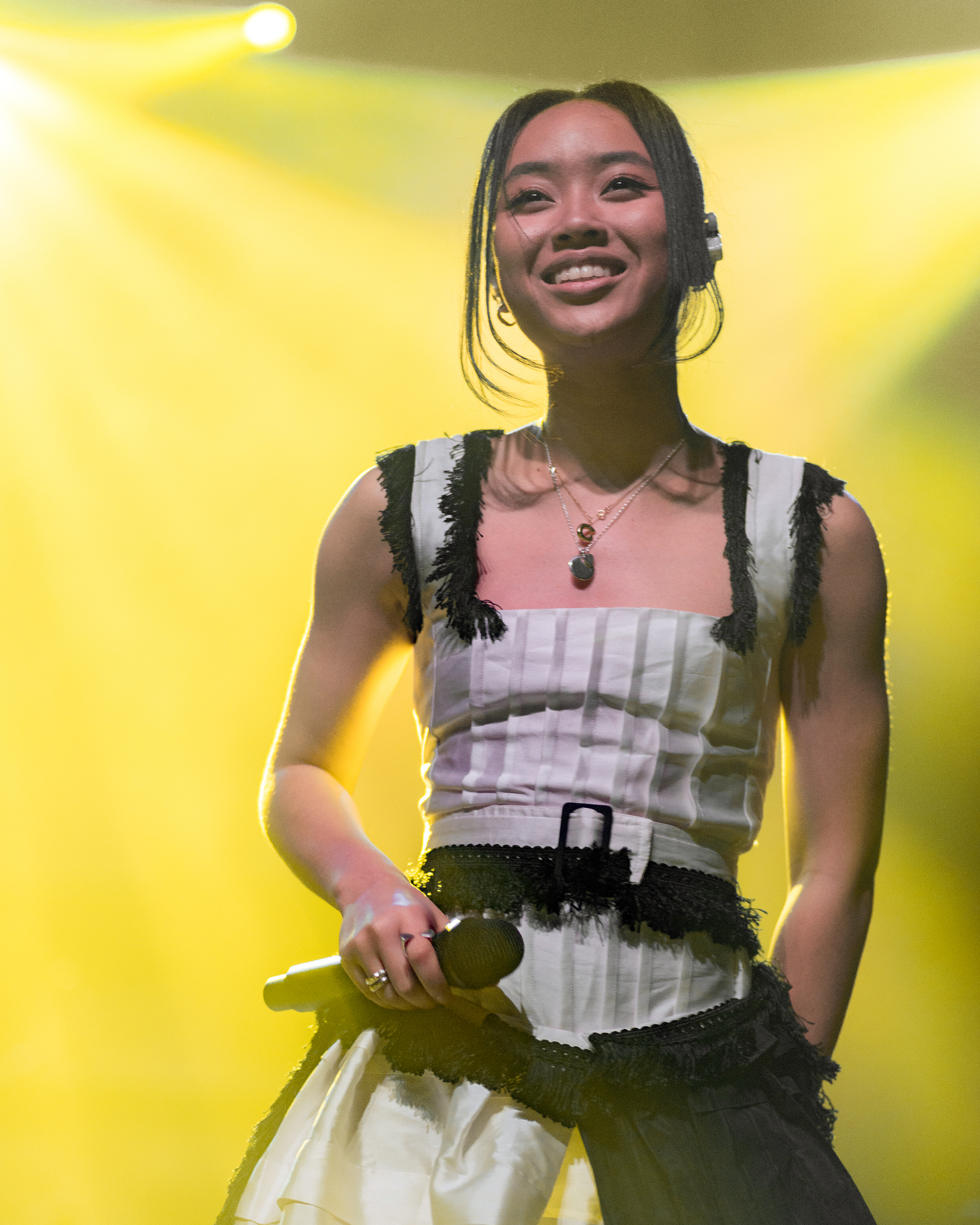
Sigrid collaborated with Griff on "Head on Fire".

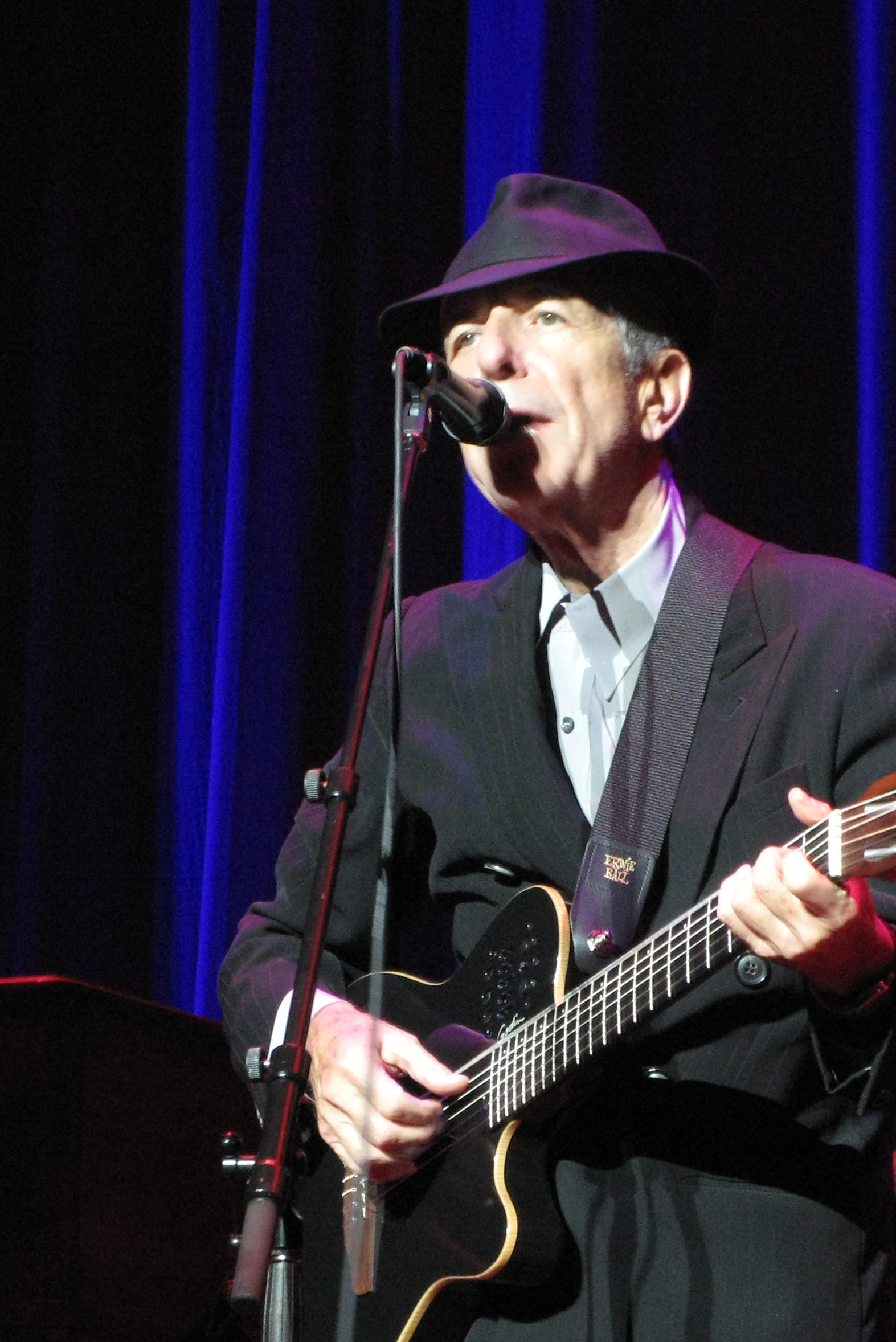
Sigrid covered Leonard Cohen's "Everybody Knows".

Key
†	Indicates a cover of another artist's previous work

List of songs, showing artist(s), writer(s), originating album, and year released
Song	Artist(s)	Writer(s)	Album	Year	Ref.
"Bad Habits" (Note: Ed Sheeran cover) †	Sigrid	Ed Sheeran; Fred Gibson; Johnny McDaid	How to Let Go (Apple Music edition)	2022	
"Bad Life"	Sigrid and Bring Me the Horizon	Sigrid Solbakk Raabe; Jordan Fish; Oliver Sykes	How to Let Go	2022	
"Basic"	Sigrid	Sigrid Solbakk Raabe; Jonny Lattimer	Sucker Punch	2019	
"Blue"	Sigrid	Sigrid Solbakk Raabe; Odd Martin Skålnes	How to Let Go (Special edition)	2022	
"Borderline"	Sigrid	Sigrid Solbakk Raabe; Askjell Solstrand	The Hype	2023	
"Burning Bridges"	Sigrid	Sigrid Solbakk Raabe; Caroline Ailin; Sylvester Willy Sivertsen	How to Let Go	2021	
"Business Dinners"	Sigrid	Sigrid Solbakk Raabe; Martin Stilling; Patrik Berger; Noonie Bao	Sucker Punch	2019	
"Dancer"	Sigrid	Sigrid Solbakk Raabe; Caroline Ailin; Sylvester Willy Sivertsen	How to Let Go	2022	
"Don't Feel Like Crying"	Sigrid	Sigrid Solbakk Raabe; Emily Warren; Oscar Holter	Sucker Punch	2019	
"Don't Kill My Vibe"	Sigrid	Sigrid Solbakk Raabe; Martin Sjølie	Don't Kill My Vibe and Sucker Punch	2017	
"A Driver Saved My Night"	Sigrid	Sigrid Solbakk Raabe; Caroline Ailin; Sylvester Willy Sivertsen	How to Let Go	2022	
"Dynamite" (Note: On Don't Kill My Vibe, "Dynamite" is titled as "Dynamite (Acoustic)".)	Sigrid	Sigrid Solbakk Raabe; Martin Sjølie; Askjell Solstrand	Don't Kill My Vibe and Sucker Punch	2017	
"Everybody Knows" (Note: Leonard Cohen cover) †	Sigrid	Leonard Cohen; Sharon Robinson	Justice League: Original Motion Picture Soundtrack	2017	
"Everybody Says They're Fine"	Sigrid	Sigrid Solbakk Raabe; Brett Leland; Caroline Ailin; Sylvester Willy Sivertsen	How to Let Go (Special edition)	2022	
"Fake Friends"	Sigrid	Sigrid Solbakk Raabe; Martin Sjølie	Don't Kill My Vibe	2017	
"The Feeling"	Kygo and Sigrid	Sigrid Solbakk Raabe; Kyrre Gørvell-Dahll; Johan Lindbrandt; Julia Gargano	Kygo	2024	
"Flying on the Ground"	Tellef Raabe featuring Sigrid	Tellef Raabe	Idiographic	2016	
"Focus (Demo)"	Sigrid	Sigrid Solbakk Raabe	Raw	2018	
"Fort Knox"	Sigrid	Sigrid Solbakk Raabe; Askjell Solstrand; Michelle Leonard	There's Always More That I Could Say	2025	
"Ghost"	Sigrid	Sigrid Solbakk Raabe; Ian Fitchuk; Foy Vance	The Hype	2023	
"Grow"	Sigrid	Sigrid Solbakk Raabe; Sarah Aarons; John Hill	How to Let Go	2022	
"Head on Fire" (Note: A reworked version of "Head on Fire" featuring King Princess and MØ was also released.)	Griff and Sigrid	Griff; Sigrid Solbakk Raabe; Joe Rubel	Non-album single	2022	
"High Five"	Sigrid	Sigrid Solbakk Raabe; Emily Warren; Martin Sjølie	Raw	2018	
"High Note"	Sigrid	Sigrid Solbakk Raabe; Caroline Ailin; Sylvester Willy Sivertsen	How to Let Go	2022	
"Home to You" (Note: A Christmas version of "Home to You" titled "Home to You (This Christmas)" was released in November 2021.)	Sigrid	Sigrid Solbakk Raabe; Steve Mac	The Aeronauts (Original Motion Picture Soundtrack)	2019	
"The Hype"	Sigrid	Sigrid Solbakk Raabe; Nick Hahn	The Hype	2023	
"I Don't Want to Know"	Sigrid	Sigrid Solbakk Raabe; Jamie Hartman	Raw	2018	
"I'll Always Be Your Girl"	Sigrid	Sigrid Solbakk Raabe Nick Hahn	There's Always More I Could Say	2025	
"In Vain"	Sigrid	Sigrid Solbakk Raabe; Joe Janiak	Sucker Punch	2019	
"It Gets Dark"	Sigrid	Sigrid Solbakk Raabe; Emily Warren; Sylvester Willy Sivertsen	How to Let Go	2022	
"Jellyfish"	Sigrid	Sigrid Solbakk Raabe; Askjell Solstrand	There's Always More That I Could Say	2025	
"Known You Forever"	Sigrid (Note: As Sigrid Raabe)	Sigrid Solbakk Raabe; Martin Abelvik Walbø	Non-album single	2014	
"Last to Know"	Sigrid	Sigrid Solbakk Raabe; Caroline Ailin; Sylvester Willy Sivertsen	How to Let Go	2022	
"Level Up"	Sigrid	Sigrid Solbakk Raabe; Emily Warren; Odd Martin Skålnes	Sucker Punch	2019	
"Lost" (Note: Frank Ocean cover) †	Sigrid	Christopher Breaux; James Ryan Ho; Micah Otano; Paul "Phamous" Shelton	How to Let Go (Apple Music edition)	2022	
"Mine Right Now"	Sigrid	Sigrid Solbakk Raabe; Emily Warren; Martin Sjølie	Sucker Punch	2019	
"Mirror"	Sigrid	Sigrid Solbakk Raabe; Caroline Ailin; Emily Warren; Sylvester Willy Sivertsen	How to Let Go	2021	
"Mistake Like You"	Sigrid	Sigrid Solbakk Raabe; Emily Warren; Martin Sjølie	How to Let Go	2022	
"Never Mine"	Sigrid	Sigrid Solbakk Raabe; Martin Sjølie; Noonie Bao	Sucker Punch	2019	
"One Kiss" (Note: Calvin Harris and Dua Lipa cover) †	Sigrid	Adam Wiles; Jessie Reyez; Dua Lipa	BBC Radio 1's Live Lounge: The Collection	2019	
"Plot Twist"	Sigrid	Sigrid Solbakk Raabe; George Flint; Henry Flint	Don't Kill My Vibe	2017	
"Raw"	Sigrid	Sigrid Solbakk Raabe; Odd Martin Skålnes	Raw	2018	
"Risk of Getting Hurt"	Sigrid	Sigrid Solbakk Raabe; Caroline Ailin; Sylvester Willy Sivertsen	How to Let Go	2022	
"Schedules"	Sigrid	Sigrid Solbakk Raabe; Simen Hope	Raw	2018	
"Sight of You"	Sigrid	Sigrid Solbakk Raabe; Askjell Solstrand	Sucker Punch	2019	
"Sister"	Tellef Raabe featuring Sigrid	Tellef Raabe	Idiographic	2016	
"Strangers"	Sigrid	Sigrid Solbakk Raabe; Martin Sjølie	Sucker Punch	2017	
"Sucker Punch"	Sigrid	Sigrid Solbakk Raabe; Emily Warren; Martin Sjølie	Sucker Punch	2018	
"Sun"	Sigrid	Sigrid Solbakk Raabe	Non-album single	2013	
"Thank Me Later"	Sigrid	Sigrid Solbakk Raabe; Caroline Ailin; Sylvester Willy Sivertsen	How to Let Go	2022	
"Times Like These" (Note: Foo Fighters cover) †	Live Lounge Allstars (Note: Composed of Sigrid, 5 Seconds of Summer, AJ Tracey, Anne-Marie, Bastille, Biffy Clyro, Celeste, Chris Martin, Dermot Kennedy, Dua Lipa, Ellie Goulding, Grace Carter, Hailee Steinfeld, Jess Glynne, Mabel, Paloma Faith, Rag'n'Bone Man, Rita Ora, Royal Blood, Sam Fender, Sean Paul, Yungblud and Zara Larsson)	Dave Grohl; Taylor Hawkins; Nate Mendel; Chris Shiflett	Non-album single	2020	
"Two Fish"	Sigrid	Sigrid Solbakk Raabe	Non-album single	2013	
"Two Years"	Sigrid	Sigrid Solbakk Raabe; Askjell Solstrand	There's Always More That I Could Say	2025	
"Wanted It to Be You"	Sigrid	Sigrid Solbakk Raabe; Seth Mosley	The Hype	2023	

== Unreleased songs ==
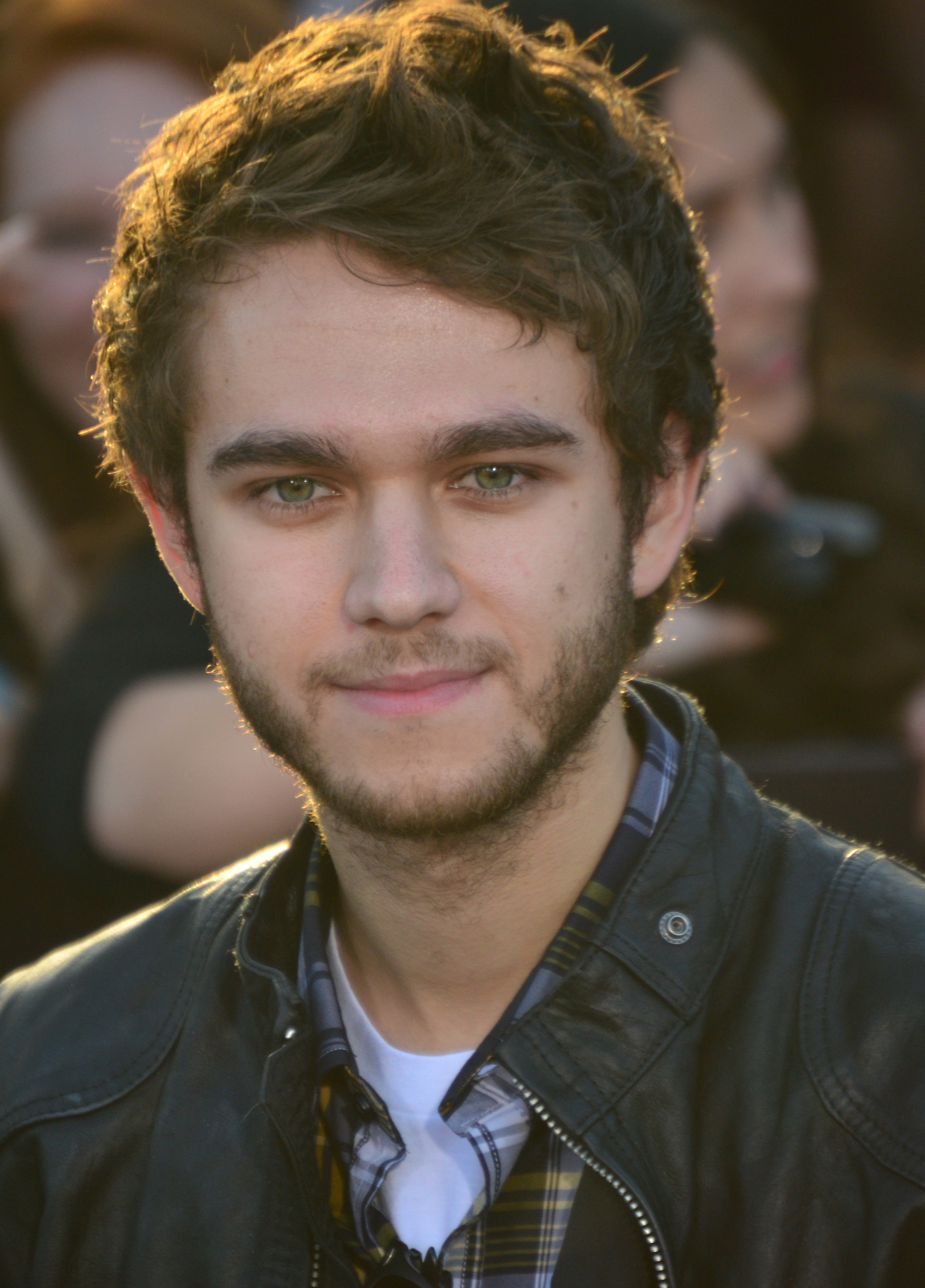
Sigrid and Zedd collaborated on "Are You Happy Now", which was released without Sigrid.

List of unreleased songs, with notes about them
Song	Notes	Ref.
"Credit"	Written by Sigrid, Caroline Ailin, Thomas Barnes, Peter Kelleher and Benjamin Kohn; Registered with the American Society of Composers, Authors and Publishers (ASCAP)	
"Dip My Heart in Confetti"	Written by Sigrid, Nicolas Bosslau, Alexandra Lehti and Michelle Leonard; The song was initially meant for Sigrid, however it was given to and released by Lxandra.; Registered with ASCAP	
"Give It Up"	Written by Sigrid and Magnus Skylstad; Registered with ASCAP	
"Go to War"	Written by Sigrid, Per Eklund and Henrik Jonzon; Registered with ASCAP	
"Happy Now"	Originally titled "Are You Happy Now"; Collaboration with Zedd; Revealed by Zedd during an interview with Billboard in August 2017; Released as "Happy Now" with Sigrid being replaced by Elley Duhé for unknown reasons	
"I Don't Buy It"	Written by Sigrid and Martin Sjølie; Registered with ASCAP	
"Missing Out"	Written by Sigrid, Thomas Baxter, Adam Midgley, Gerard O'Connell; Registered with ASCAP	
"Sadness for Sale"	Recorded by Sigrid and her sister as Sala Says Mhyp; Uploaded to SoundCloud	
"Savage in Our Blood"	Written by Sigrid and Odd Martin Skålnes; Registered with ASCAP	
