= Sigrid discography =

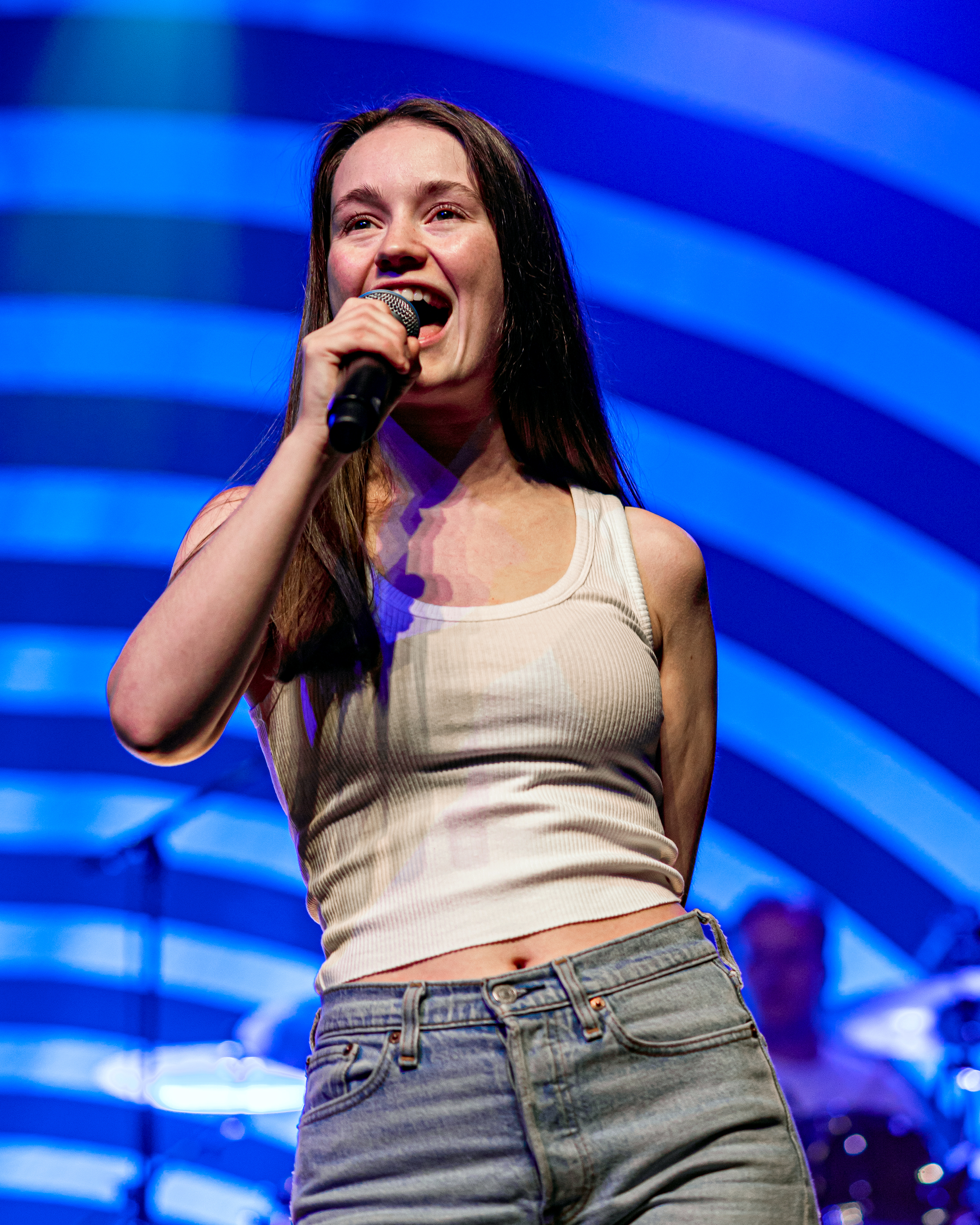
- Sigrid performing in 2022
- Studio albums: 3
- EPs: 3
- Singles: 28
- Music videos: 12

The discography of Norwegian singer-songwriter Sigrid consists of three studio albums, three extended plays, 28 singles (including one as a featured artist), two guest appearances and 16 music videos. In addition to her own releases, Sigrid has also been a songwriter for other artists including Rudimental and Paloma Faith.

On 10 February 2017, Sigrid released her single, "Don't Kill My Vibe". On 5 May 2017, Sigrid released her debut extended play (EP), of the same name. "Strangers" was released on 10 November 2017; the track topped charts in Croatia and Scotland, as well as reaching the top 10 in the United Kingdom and Norway, the latter being her native country. Sigrid released her second extended play, Raw, on 11 July 2018. It was preceded by the release of three singles: a titular track, "High Five" and "Schedules".

Sigrid's debut album, Sucker Punch, was released on 8 March 2019. The project was preceded by tracks "Don't Kill My Vibe", "Strangers", "Sucker Punch" and "Don't Feel Like Crying". The album topped the charts in Norway and reached the top five in Ireland, Scotland and United Kingdom. How to Let Go, Sigrid's second studio album, was released on 6 May 2022. Its singles included "Mirror", "Burning Bridges", "It Gets Dark" and the Bring Me the Horizon-assisted track "Bad Life".

In 2023, Sigrid released her third EP, The Hype. A year later, she appeared on a Kygo song. Then, after a two-year gap of releasing no music as a lead artist, she returned in July 2025 with the song "Jellyfish". The song acts as the lead single from her third studio album, There's Always More That I Could Say, and was followed by the singles "Fort Knox" and "Two Years".

== Studio albums ==
List of albums, with selected chart positions and certifications
Title	Details	Peak chart positions										Certifications
Title	Details	NOR	AUS	AUT	BEL (FL)	GER	IRE	SCO	SWE	SWI	UK	Certifications
Sucker Punch	Released: 8 March 2019; Label: Island; Format: CD, cassette, vinyl, digital download, streaming	1	84	51	34	63	4	4	57	54	4	IFPI NOR: 2× Platinum; BPI: Gold
How to Let Go	Released: 6 May 2022; Label: Island; Format: CD, cassette, vinyl, digital download, streaming	1	—	—	100	61	11	4	—	73	2	BPI: Silver
There's Always More That I Could Say	Released: 24 October 2025; Label: EMI Norway; Format: CD, vinyl, digital download, streaming	18	—	—	124	—	—	6	—	—	10	

== Extended plays ==
List of extended plays, with selected chart positions
Title	Details	Peak chart positions
Title	Details	US Heat
Don't Kill My Vibe	Released: 5 May 2017; Label: Island; Format: Digital download, vinyl, streaming	19
Raw	Released: 11 July 2018; Label: Island; Format: CD, vinyl, digital download, streaming	—
The Hype	Released: 27 October 2023; Label: Island; Format: CD, vinyl, digital download, streaming	—

== Singles ==
=== As lead artist ===
List of singles as lead artist, with selected chart positions and certifications, showing album name and year released
Title	Year	Peak chart positions										Certifications	Album
Title	Year	NOR	AUS	AUT	BEL (FL) Tip	BEL (WA) Tip	GER	IRL	JPN Over.	UK	US Dance Airplay	Certifications	Album
"Sun"	2013	—	—	—	—	—	—	—	—	—	—		Non-album singles
"Two Fish"	2013	—	—	—	—	—	—	—	—	—	—		Non-album singles
"Known You Forever"	2014	—	—	—	—	—	—	—	—	—	—		Non-album singles
"Don't Kill My Vibe"	2017	28	80	—	—	—	—	—	—	62	—	IFPI NOR: 2× Platinum; BPI: Gold	Don't Kill My Vibe (Note: The single "Don't Kill My Vibe" is also included on Sigrid's debut album Sucker Punch.)
"Plot Twist"	2017	—	—	—	44	—	—	—	—	—	—	IFPI NOR: Gold	Don't Kill My Vibe
"Strangers"	2017	6	—	—	25	16	—	7	—	10	—	IFPI NOR: 2× Platinum; BPI: Platinum	Sucker Punch
"Raw"	2018	—	—	—	—	—	—	—	—	—	—		Raw
"High Five"	2018	—	—	—	35	—	—	61	—	59	—	BPI: Silver	Raw
"I Don't Want to Know"	2018	—	—	—	—	—	—	—	—	—	—		Raw
"Schedules"	2018	—	—	—	—	—	—	—	—	—	—		Raw
"Sucker Punch"	2018	12	—	—	—	14	—	96	—	—	—	IFPI NOR: Platinum	Sucker Punch
"Don't Feel Like Crying"	2019	22	—	—	—	—	—	16	—	13	23	BPI: Platinum	Sucker Punch
"Sight of You"	2019	30	—	—	—	—	—	—	—	—	—		Sucker Punch
"Mine Right Now"	2019	40	—	—	—	—	—	—	—	—	—		Sucker Punch
"Home to You"	2019	18	—	75	—	—	88	—	—	— (Note: "Home to You" did not enter the UK Singles Chart but peaked at number 10 on the UK Singles Downloads Chart.)	—		The Aeronauts (Soundtrack)
"Mirror"	2021	13	—	—	—	—	—	76	—	49	1	BPI: Silver	How to Let Go
"Burning Bridges"	2021	38	—	—	—	—	—	—	—	— (Note: "Burning Bridges" did not enter the UK Singles Chart but peaked at number 87 on the UK Singles Downloads Chart.)	—		How to Let Go
"Head on Fire" (with Griff)	2022	33	—	—	—	—	—	—	—	44	—		Non-album single
"It Gets Dark"	2022	39	—	—	—	—	—	—	—	— (Note: "It Gets Dark" did not enter the UK Singles Chart but peaked at number 96 on the UK Singles Downloads Chart.)	—		How to Let Go
"Bad Life" (with Bring Me the Horizon)	2022	28	—	—	—	—	— (Note: "Bad Life" did not enter the Official German Singles Chart, but peaked at number 77 on the Germany Download Singles chart.)	—	—	50	—	BPI: Silver	How to Let Go
"Blue"	2022	—	—	—	—	—	—	—	—	—	—		How to Let Go (Special Edition)
"The Hype"	2023	37	—	—	—	—	—	—	—	—	—		The Hype
"Ghost"	2023	—	—	—	—	—	—	—	—	—	—		The Hype
"Jellyfish"	2025	—	—	—	—	—	—	—	—	—	—		There's Always More That I Could Say
"Fort Knox"	2025	—	—	—	—	—	—	—	—	—	—		There's Always More That I Could Say
"Two Years"	2025	—	—	—	—	—	—	—	15	—	—		There's Always More That I Could Say
"Hush Baby, Hurry Slowly"	2025	100	—	—	—	—	—	—	14	—	—		There's Always More That I Could Say
"—" denotes a single that did not chart or was not released.

=== As featured artist ===
List of singles as featured artist, with selected chart positions, showing year released
Title	Year	Peak chart positions	Album
Title	Year	UK	Album
"Times Like These" (as part of Live Lounge Allstars)	2020	1	Non-album single

== Other charted songs ==
List of other charted songs, with selected chart positions, showing album name and year released
Title	Year	Peak chart positions	Album
Title	Year	SCO	Album
"Everybody Knows"	2017	97	Justice League

== Guest appearances ==
List of guest appearances, showing album name and year released
Title	Year	Other artist(s)	Album
"One Kiss"	2019	None	BBC Radio 1's Live Lounge: The Collection
"The Feeling"	2024	Kygo	Kygo

=== Songwriting credits ===
List of songs co-written for other artists
Year	Artist	Album	Song	Co-written with
2019	Rudimental	Toast to Our Differences	"Adrenaline" (feat. Olivia)	Amir Izadkhah, Piers Aggett, Kesi Dryden, Leon Rolle
2019	Lxandra	Another Lesson Learned EP	"Dip My Heart in Confetti"	Alexandra Lehti, Michelle Leonard, Nicholas Rebscher
2020	Paloma Faith	Infinite Things	"Gold"	Steve McCutcheon

== Music videos ==
=== As lead artist ===
List of music videos, showing year released and director(s)
Title	Year	Director(s)	Ref.
"Don't Kill My Vibe"	2017	J.A.C.K.	
"Plot Twist"	2017	Sigurd Fossen; William Glandberger	
"Strangers"	2017	Ivana Bobic	
"High Five"	2018	Ivana Bobic	
"Sucker Punch"	2018	AB/CD/CD	
"Don't Feel Like Crying"	2019	Zhang + Knight	
"Mine Right Now"	2019	Max Siedentopf	
"Mine Right Now" (Vertical Video)	2019	—N/a	
"Mirror"	2021	Femke Huurdeman	
"Burning Bridges"	2021	Sophia Ray	
"It Gets Dark"	2022	Femke Huurdeman	
"Bad Life" (with Bring Me the Horizon)	2022	Raja Virdi	
"Jellyfish"	2025	Palice	

=== As featured artist ===
List of music videos, showing year released and director(s)
Title	Year	Director(s)	Ref.
"Sister" (Tellef Raabe)	2016	—N/a	
"Times Like These" (Artists of Live Lounge Allstars)	2020	—N/a	
