= Jellyfish (song) =

2025 single by Sigrid

Single by Sigrid

from the album There's Always More That I Could Say
- Released: 11 July 2025
- Genre: Indie pop
- Length: 3:06
- Label: EMI Norway
- Songwriters: Sigrid Solbakk Raabe; Askjell Solstrand
- Producers: Sigrid Solbakk Raabe; Askjell Solstrand

Sigrid singles chronology
"Ghost" (2023)	"Jellyfish" (2025)	"Fort Knox" (2025)

Music video
- "Jellyfish" on YouTube

"Jellyfish" is a song by Norwegian singer-songwriter Sigrid, released by EMI Norway on 11 July 2025 as the lead single from her third studio album, There's Always More That I Could Say (2025). It was written and produced by Sigrid alongside frequent collaborator Askjell, and marks Sigrid's first official credit as a producer—despite her later clarifying that she has co-produced throughout her entire career.

The lyrical content of the song explores embracing new platonic and romantic connections, as well as being your authentic self in front of new people. Sigrid wanted the song to be an easy listen to "feel like a Scandinavian summer" and for the production of the song to be carefree and nonchalant. It marked Sigrid's first release as a lead artist in two years, following the release of her extended play The Hype (2023).

== Background ==
Following her second studio album, How to Let Go (2022), Sigrid released an extended play The Hype (2023). Her only musical release between The Hype and "Jellyfish" was an appearance on Kygo's 2024 self-titled album, marking her return as a lead artist after two years.

"Jellyfish" was released on 11 July 2025 and acts as the lead single from her third studio album, There's Always More That I Could Say, set to be released in October 2025. It was written and produced by Sigrid and frequent collaborator Askjell, who has worked with her since her first project, Don't Kill My Vibe (2017). The pair had the 2004 film Napoleon Dynamite playing in the background during the making of "Jellyfish". Speaking on the production of the track, Sigrid said that it was a natural process as the melody came about when the two were humming, noting that it immediately felt catchy. Despite the song's credits being the first to credit Sigrid as a producer, she clarified to The Independent that it "doesn't really change a thing" since she had co-produced throughout her whole career, the difference being that this was the first time she was acknowledged professionally.

== Composition ==
"Jellyfish" is an indie-pop song that was described as a track "drawing inspiration from early 2000s indie sounds and the music [Sigrid] grew up with". Speaking on the song herself, Sigrid stated that she wanted it to be an easy listen and to feel "like a Scandinavian summer". She clarified that she loves using her music to be a vessel to pour her heart out, but wanted "Jellyfish" to be "carefree, joyful and playful – maybe a bit nonchalant". The lyrical content of the song explores flirting and embracing new platonic and romantic connections, as well as being your true self in front of new people. Euphoria wrote that the song expresses that it is "best to just let go of whatever is expected and instead just take life as it comes", as well as comparing the production style to "As It Was" by Harry Styles and "All I Ever Asked" by Rachel Chinouriri.

== Credits and personnel ==
Credits were adapted from Spotify.

- Sigrid Solbakk Raabe – vocals, songwriting, production
- Askjell Solstrand – songwriting, production

== Release history ==
Release history for "Jellyfish"
Region	Date	Format	Label	Ref.
Various	11 July 2025	Digital download; streaming	Island Records	
