= Fort Knox (Sigrid song) =

2025 single by Sigrid

Single by Sigrid

from the album There's Always More That I Could Say
- Released: 19 August 2025
- Genre: Dance-pop, synth-pop
- Length: 3:18
- Label: EMI Norway
- Songwriters: Sigrid Solbakk Raabe; Askjell Solstrand; Michelle Leonard
- Producers: Sigrid Solbakk Raabe; Askjell Solstrand; James Ford

Sigrid singles chronology
"Jellyfish" (2025)	"Fort Knox" (2025)	"Two Years" (2025)

Visualiser
- "Fort Knox" on YouTube

"Fort Knox" is a song recorded by Norwegian singer-songwriter Sigrid. It was released by EMI Norway on 19 August 2025 as the second single from her third studio album, There's Always More That I Could Say (2025).

The lyrical content of the song explores Sigrid's rage following a heartbreak and references the US military post Fort Knox. The chorus of "Fort Knox" revolves around her wanting to lock her love away and safeguard it like the military post. Sigrid worked on "Fort Knox" with frequent collaborator Askjell, as well as receiving support from Michelle Leonard and James Ford for the track.

== Background and composition ==
On 11 July 2025, Sigrid released the song "Jellyfish". It marked her first release as a lead artist in two years, following the extended play The Hype (2023). Then, a month later, she announced the release of "Fort Knox" for 19 August, as well as announcing that the two songs would be included on her third studio album, There's Always More That I Could Say (2025). The song received its first radio play from BBC Radio 1 the night prior to its release. Sigrid worked with frequent collaborator Askjell on both the songwriting and production of the track; Michelle Leonard also co-wrote "Fort Knox", with James Ford lending support on the production.

The lyrical content of "Fort Knox" explores Sigrid's rage following a heartbreak. It references US army post Fort Knox, noting that she wants to "lock [her] love in a box, and safeguard it like it's Fort Knox". Speaking to BBC Radio 1 about the song, Sigrid said: "Fort Knox is a song for everyone who's angry, who's been hurt. It's joyous, it's energetic. [...] I made it in Bergen, in Norway, in the same studio I've made so much music. So it's just really exciting." Dork wrote that the song covers "infatuation, heartbreak and reflection and "channels post-break-up fury". DIY wrote that the single is a "pulsing, synth-led instant earworm".

== Track listing ==
Digital download and streaming

1. "Fort Knox" – 3:18
2. "Jellyfish" – 3:25

== Credits and personnel ==
Credits adapted from Spotify.

- Sigrid Solbakk Raabe – vocals, songwriting, production
- Askjell Solstrand – songwriting, production
- Michelle Leonard – songwriting
- James Ford – production

== Release history ==
Release history for "Fort Knox"
Region	Date	Format	Label	Ref.
Various	11 July 2025	Digital download; streaming	Island Records	
