= There's Always More That I Could Say =

Studio album by Sigrid
- Released: 24 October 2025
- Studio: Rustic (Bergen)
- Length: 30:56
- Label: Island; EMI Norway
- Producer: Oli Bayston; Edvard Erfjord; James Ford; Anders Nilsen; Payday; Sigrid Solbakk Raabe; Askjell Solstrand

Sigrid chronology
The Hype (2023)	There's Always More That I Could Say (2025)

Singles from There's Always More That I Could Say
- 1. "Jellyfish" Released: 11 July 2025; 2. "Fort Knox" Released: 19 August 2025

There's Always More That I Could Say is the third studio album by Norwegian singer Sigrid. It was released on 24 October 2025 through EMI Norway. The album was preceded by two singles, "Jellyfish" and "Fort Knox", alongside the promotional single, "Two Years".

== Background and composition ==
After the release of her second studio album, How to Let Go (2022), Sigrid announced her third studio album in August 2025; There's Always More That I Could Say would be released on 24 October via Island Records and EMI Norway. Sigrid described the record as "accidental breakup album", reflecting on themes of infatuation and heartbreak. The album was recorded in a rustic studio by the harbour in Bergen, where she said she stepped away from the pressures of "content culture" to "rediscover the joy of making music simply for the love of it." Executive-produced by Askjell, There's Always More That I Could Say is said to deliver Sigrid's signature feel-good freedom, blending punchy pop hooks with anthemic choruses.

== Promotion ==
=== Singles ===
The lead single, "Jellyfish", was released on 11 July 2025 with its music video. Sigrid performed the song live during her Oslo in London show and appeared at several major European festivals, including TRNSMT, Latitude, Tramlines, and Y Not, as part of her summer 2025 festival run. The second single, "Fort Knox", was released on 19 August 2025, alongside the album's announcement. On 26 September 2025, Sigrid released the first promotional single, "Two Years", co-written with Askjell. (Note: In CD release of There's Always More That I Could Say, it is said that the album includes two singles, "Jellyfish" and "Fort Knox".)

=== Tour ===
Sigrid announced the There's Always More That I Could Say Tour in support of the album. It is scheduled to run from January to March 2026, beginning with two shows in Oslo and continuing through major European cities including Copenhagen, Berlin, Amsterdam, Paris, London, and Dublin, before concluding in Glasgow. The tour marks her return to Ireland following her 2022 Cosy Tour, and showcases a new stage production inspired by the themes of self-reflection and renewal explored on the album. In addition to her headlining shows, Sigrid is also set to support Ed Sheeran on his Loop Tour across North America in July and August 2026.

== Critical reception ==
Professional ratings
Review scores
Source	Rating
AllMusic	3.5/5 stars
Clash	6/10
Dork	4/5
The Line of Best Fit	7/10
NRK	4/6
Stereoboard	4/5 stars

Neil Z. Yeung of AllMusic wrote that There's Always More That I Could Say is "another reliable, catchy set of earnest, powerful pop/rock anthems". Clash's Eduarda Goulart described the album as "a step forward into the European-glittery world of heartbreak", praising its confident vocals and polished production. For Dork, Ciaran Picker called it "a journey that underscores Sigrid's confidence in what she does best: make pure pop bangers." In The Line of Best Fit, David Cobbald commended the album's lyricism and wrote that the album displays Sigrid's "consistency across all the years". Ellisiv Sunde Myrva of the NRK thought that There's Always More That I Could Say "feels less like an album and more like a foundation for something more in [Sigrid's] pop music".

== Track listing ==
There's Always More That I Could Say track listing
No.	Title	Lyrics	Music	Producer(s)	Length
1.	"I'll Always Be Your Girl"	Sigrid Solbakk Raabe	Raabe; Nick Hahn	Raabe; Askjell Solstrand; Hahn^{[a]}	2:51
2.	"Jellyfish"	Raabe	Raabe; Askjell Solstrand	Raabe; Solstrand	3:06
3.	"Do It Again"	Raabe	Raabe; Martin Sjølie; William Taylor	Raabe; Solstrand	2:53
4.	"Kiss the Sky"	Raabe	Raabe; Hahn; Noah Johansen	Raabe; Solstrand; Whammyboy^{[a]}	2:38
5.	"Two Years"	Raabe	Raabe; Solstrand; Fredrik Svabø	Raabe; Solstrand; James Ford	2:52
6.	"Hush Baby, Hurry Slowly"	Raabe	Raabe; Edvard Erfjord; Anders Nilsen; Solstrand; Harald Sørebø	Raabe; Solstrand; Erfjord; Nilsen; Payday	2:44
7.	"Fort Knox"	Raabe	Raabe; Michelle Leonard; Solstrand	Raabe; Solstrand; Ford	3:18
8.	"There's Always More That I Could Say"	Raabe	Raabe; Oli Bayston; Taylor	Raabe; Bayston	2:41
9.	"Have You Heard This Song Before"	Raabe	Raabe; Johansen; Solstrand	Raabe; Solstrand	4:21
10.	"Eternal Sunshine"	Raabe	Raabe; Edward Carlile; Taylor	Raabe; Solstrand	3:32
Total length:					30:56

=== Note ===
- ^{^[a]} indicates an additional producer.

== Personnel ==
Credits were adapted from Tidal.

- Sigrid Solbakk Raabe – vocals
- Josh Gudwin – mixing
- Felix Byrne – mixing assistance
- Chris Gehringer – mastering
- Askjell Solstrand – keyboards, engineering (tracks 1–7, 9, 10); electric guitar (1–5, 7, 9, 10), bass (1–3, 7, 9, 10), piano (1, 2, 5, 7, 10), background vocals (2, 10), acoustic guitar (3, 4, 9, 10), drum programming (4–7, 9), synthesizer (6)
- Gudmund Guren – drums (1–4, 6, 9, 10)
- Fredrik Svabø – electric guitar (1–3, 5–7, 10), acoustic guitar (2, 5, 10), engineering (10)
- Elise Yuka – flute (1, 2, 5)
- Nick Hahn – engineering (1)
- Christian Bjerkeli – synthesizer (3, 9, 10); drum programming, synthesizer (7)
- Noah Johansen – electric guitar (4, 9); bass, drum programming, keyboards, engineering (4)
- James Ford – keyboards (5, 7); bass, drums, electric guitar, engineering (5); drum programming (7)
- Edvard Erfjord – drum programming, synthesizer, engineering (6)
- Anders Nilsen – drum programming, synthesizer (6)
- Harald Sørebø – drum programming, synthesizer (6)
- Davide Rossi – strings, string arrangement (7, 10)
- Oli Bayston – piano, engineering (8)

== Charts ==
Chart (2025)	Peak position
Belgian Albums (Ultratop Flanders)	124
Norwegian Albums (IFPI Norge)	18
Scottish Albums (OCC)	6
UK Albums (OCC)	12

== Release history ==
List of release dates and formats
Region	Date	Format(s)	Label	Ref.
Various	24 October 2025	Cassette; CD; digital download; streaming; vinyl LP	Island	
