= Noche Without You =

2026 song by Skrillex featuring Feid

Song by Skrillex featuring Feid

from the album Soma
- Released: June 5, 2026
- Genre: Trance
- Length: 3:23
- Label: Owsla; Atlantic
- Songwriters: Sonny Moore; Roberto Concina; Sylvester Sivertsen; Salomón Villada Hoyos; Rami Yacoub
- Producers: Skrillex; Sly Sylvester

"Noche Without You" is a song by American record producer Skrillex featuring Colombian singer and songwriter Feid. It was released on June 5, 2026 as the fifth track from his fifth studio album, Soma (2026).

== Background ==
The track heavily samples the song Children by Robert Miles. The song itself is about losing love, loneliness, and sleeping on your own after a relationship.

== Critical reception ==
Billboard said of the song, "Love and the lack of it are rare overt themes in the Skrillex catalog, making this one even more of a standout". CULTR said the song positively leaned "heavily into global club textures".

== Charts ==
Chart performance
Chart (2026)	Peak position
El Salvador Anglo Airplay (Monitor Latino)	8
Lithuania Airplay (TopHit)	35
New Zealand Hot Singles (RMNZ)	32
US Hot Dance/Electronic Songs (Billboard)	16
