= Sylvester Sivertsen =

Sly
- Born: Sylvester Willy Sivertsen; 8 May 1992 (age 34)
- Years active: 2018-present

Sylvester Willy Sivertsen (born 8 May 1992), known professionally as Sly, is a Danish songwriter and music producer who has written and produced songs including Skrillex's "Noche Without You" ft. Feid, Dua Lipa's "We're Good", Sigrid's album "How To Let Go", Jonas Brothers' "Comeback" (from the album Happiness Begins), Shawn Mendes' "Higher", The Chainsmokers' "Side Effects", Måneskin’s third studio album Rush! (ARE U COMING?) alongside Max Martin.

Sly is the son of Danish singer and songwriter Lis Sørensen and drummer Jan Sivertsen.

== Discography ==
=== Production and songwriting credits ===
Year	Artist	Title	Record label	Achievements
2026	Skrillex	Noche Without You feat. Feid	OWSLA / Atlantic Records	
2026	Tiger La Flor	"Hollywoodland", "Bad Company"	Arista Records	
2025	Benee	"Princess", "Chainmail"	Republic Records	
2025	Tom Grennan	"Cool with That"	Insanity Records, Sony Music	
	Kylie Cantrall	"Goodie Bag"	Artist Partner Group	
	MØ	"SWEET feat. Biig Piig"	RCA	
2023	Måneskin	HONEY (ARE U COMING?)	EPIC	
2023	UPSAHL	WET WHITE TEE SHIRT (SIDE A)	ARISTA Records	
2022	5 Seconds of Summer	Flatline	BMG Rights Management (US) LCC	
2022	Winona Oak	Radio	Warner Music Group	
2022	Måneskin	SUPERMODEL	EPIC, Sony Music	SUPERMODEL: Platinum and gold certified, BMI Award 2023 "Most-Performed Songs of the Year"
2022	Måneskin	TIMEZONE	EPIC, Sony Music	SUPERMODEL: Platinum and gold certified, BMI Award 2023 "Most-Performed Songs of the Year"
2022	Måneskin	BABY SAID	EPIC, Sony Music	SUPERMODEL: Platinum and gold certified, BMI Award 2023 "Most-Performed Songs of the Year"
2022	Måneskin	GASOLINE	EPIC, Sony Music	SUPERMODEL: Platinum and gold certified, BMI Award 2023 "Most-Performed Songs of the Year"
2022	Måneskin	DON'T WANNA SLEEP	EPIC, Sony Music	SUPERMODEL: Platinum and gold certified, BMI Award 2023 "Most-Performed Songs of the Year"
2022	Måneskin	IF NOT FOR YOU	EPIC, Sony Music	SUPERMODEL: Platinum and gold certified, BMI Award 2023 "Most-Performed Songs of the Year"
2022	Måneskin	READ YOUR DIARY	EPIC, Sony Music	SUPERMODEL: Platinum and gold certified, BMI Award 2023 "Most-Performed Songs of the Year"
2022	MØ	Cool to Cry	Sony Music	
2022	MØ	New Moon	Sony Music	
2022	Fletcher	Her Body Is Bible	Capitol Records	
2022	Lauv	Kids Are Born Stars		
2022	Sigrid	How To Let Go	Island Records	
2021	Westlife	Alone Together	East West Records	
2021	Sigrid	Burning Bridges	Island Records	
2021	Sigrid	Mirror	Island Records	
2021	Tove Styrke	Start Walking	Sony Music	
2021	MØ	Live to Survive	Island Records	
2021	Dua Lipa	We're Good	Warner Music	Certified Silver in UK and Gold in USA
2021	Boys World	Relapse	KYN Entertainment	
2021	David44	Understood	Thunderboy Records	
2020	Liam Payne with Cheat Codes	Live Forever	Capitol Records	
2020	Shawn Mendes	Higher	Island Records	
2020	Olivia O'Brien	Was It All In My Head?	Island Records/Universal Music	
2020	Winona Oak	With Myself	Neon Gold Records/Atlantic Records	
2020	Mads Langer	Life in Stereo	Sony Music	
2020	NCT 127	Elevator (127F)	SM Entertainment	
2020	SuperM	Together at Home	Capitol Records	
2019	Jonas Brothers	Comeback (from album Happiness Begins)	Republic Records	
2019	Gryffin	All You Need to Know (Feat. Calle Lehmann)	Darkroom Records/Geffen Records	Certified Gold
2019	Steve Aoki & Monsta X	Play it Cool	Ultra Records/Starship Entertainment	
2019	Stefan	Lies	Sony Music	
2019	Stefan	Other Hands	Sony Music	
2019	Skinz	Spotlight	Warner Music	
2019	Alexander Oscar	Highs & Lows	Sony Music	
2019	Jackson Penn	Sick In The Head	Lobster	
2018	The Chainsmokers	Side Effects feat. Emily Warren	Disruptor Records/Columbia Records	Certified Gold
2018	Liam Payne	Slow	Capitol Records/Universal Music	
2018	Jens	Mixtape	Universal Music	
2018	Norlie & KKV	Om Du Lämnar Mig Nu	Universal Music	
2018	Citybois	Glemme Mig	Sony Music	
2018	Citybois	De Eneste	Sony Music/Epic Records	

==== 2020 ====
- Sly - "Cotton Candy" (feat. Emily Warren)

== Awards ==
- Won BMI Award for Most-Performed Song of the Year 2020, for "Side Effects" by The Chainsmokers.
- Won BMI Award for Most-Performed Song of the Year 2022, for "We're Good" by Dua Lipa.
- Nominated for Carl-prisen 2020, Producer of the Year and International Success of the Year.
- Won Danish Music Award for Best Danish Producer 2021
- Nominated for Carl-prisen 2022, Pop composer of the Year and International Success of the Year.
- Won Carl Prisen 2022 for International Success of the year
