= Mirror (Sigrid song) =

Single by Sigrid

from the album How to Let Go
- Released: 26 May 2021
- Studio: Sly Studio (Copenhagen); Gold Diggers (Los Angeles)
- Genre: Disco
- Length: 2:36
- Label: Island; Petroleum; Republic; Universal
- Songwriters: Caroline Ailin; Sigrid Solbakk Raabe; Sylvester Willy Sivertsen; Emily Warren
- Producer: Sly

Sigrid singles chronology
"Home to You" (2019)	"Mirror" (2021)	"Burning Bridges" (2021)

Music video
- "Mirror" on YouTube

"Mirror" is a song by Norwegian singer-songwriter Sigrid from her second studio album, How to Let Go (2022). Sigrid co-wrote the song with Caroline Ailin, Emily Warren and Sylvester Sivertsen, with the latter also producing it. She came up with the song after she had ended a relationship. It was released on 26 May 2021 as the first single from the album, marking her first release since 2019. The instrumentation consists of several music instruments, such as drums, piano and synthesizers. A disco track, it touches on themes of empowerment, freedom and self-love.

"Mirror" was acclaimed by music critics, who praised its disco sound and lyrical themes. Commercially, the song reached number 13 in Norway and charted moderately in the United Kingdom and Ireland. It also topped Billboard's Dance/Mix Show Airplay chart. A music video directed by Femke Huurdeman premiered alongside the song. The video depicts Sigrid being accompanied by a double while engaging in various activities. Sigrid performed "Mirror" several times in 2021, including at the Reading and Leeds Festival and Jingle Bell Ball. She also included it on her set list for Glastonbury Festival 2022.

== Background and release ==
Sigrid released her debut album Sucker Punch in 2019. After its supporting concert tour concluded in December 2019, she chose to take a break from releasing music in the following year to focus on the development of her second studio album. In May 2021, Sigrid started the Walk with Sigrid campaign to encourage her fans to find clues about her new music through a scavenger hunt across their local cities. On 19 May, Sigrid shared a snippet of "Mirror" on her TikTok account, announcing that it would be released a week later. The song marked Sigrid's first release since "Home to You" (2019).

"Mirror" was released as the first single from How to Let Go on 26 May 2021 in various countries by Island Records for digital download and streaming. On the same day, Petroleum Records issued the song in Norway for the same formats. Island and Republic Records sent the single to American dance radio stations on 1 June 2021 while Universal Music Group sent it to Italian radio stations on 11 June.

== Composition and lyrics ==
Musically, "Mirror" has been described as a disco song. Lyrically, it tackles themes of empowerment, freedom and self-love. The song was written by Sigrid alongside Caroline Ailin, Emily Warren and Sylvester Sivertsen, while produced by the latter under the pseudonym "Sly". "Mirror" was recorded at Sly Studio in Copenhagen and Gold Diggers in Los Angeles. Sigrid wrote the song following a break-up, telling i-D that it "is about being okay with all the negative sides of your personality as well as the positive sides, and living with that. It's about moving on from heartache and accepting who you are". She further explained that it "is a song about accepting your personality in all its flaws".

Writing for Stereogum, Chris DeVille asserted that the song is "driven by a powerful bass groove, bolstered by contagious bursts of house piano, and accented by a string section". Vulture's Brennan Carley stated that "Mirror" is "swaddled in swelling pianos and synths" and appears to have "a standard pop construction" which consists of "vocals, piano, a steady drum, recurring strings, and a synthesizer". Moreover, he added "[the chorus] drops everything but its kick drum and piano, hoisting her technically pitch-perfect singing to the forefront". Jason Lipshutz, for Billboard, asserted that during the chorus, Sigrid "gathers up the shards of her confidence" with "strings fluttering around her" and declares, "I love who I see, looking at me, in the mirror!" According to Thomas Smith of NME, the chorus's "buoyant, direct message" is "under-pinned by slick beats and party-starting piano stabs".

== Reception ==
"Mirror" received acclaim from music critics. DeVille called it a "disco jam", likening it to the tracks on Dua Lipa's album Future Nostalgia (2020). Lipshutz labelled "Mirror" as "a disco-tinged, summertime dose of self-love" and considered the chorus to be "indelible". Carley affirmed that the song's bridge is a "homage to disco legends of yesteryear (with shades of Giorgio Moroder and Chic)" and lauded Sigrid's vocals. BBC Music reporter Mark Savage named it "a blossoming disco anthem about conquering loneliness and emptiness". Clash's Robin Murray also praised Sigrid's vocal delivery and noted that "Mirror" is "one of [Sigrid's] most potent [songs] to date". Smith stated that the song is "a celebration of the incremental changes we make; rarely do we engage in wholesale makeovers, but full of subtle improvements and recalibrations". A reviewer for DIY declared that "Sigrid is back with a banger". Lora Doyle of Hot Press called it "infectiously catchy". An editor for Capital FM compared "Mirror" favourably to American singer Lizzo and that it is "the self-love bop we all need ahead of 'hot girl summer'".

In Sigrid's native Norway, "Mirror" debuted and peaked at number 13, staying on the chart for 12 consecutive weeks. On Billboard's Dance/Mix Show Airplay chart, it became her second entry following "Don't Feel Like Crying" (2019). "Mirror" eventually topped the chart for the week ending 4 September 2021. Elsewhere, the single reached numbers 22 on Billboard's Mexico Ingles Airplay chart, 49 in the United Kingdom and 76 in Ireland.

== Music video and live performances ==
Femke Huurdeman, working for Spanish production company Canada, directed the music video, which premiered alongside the single on 26 May 2021. Throughout the visual, Sigrid performs various activities, such as spending time with a chameleon, shooting a bow and arrow and "channeling a living Rococo painting as she poses with a pomegranate" while being accompanied by a double. She sports different "flashy and unflashy outfits" with one "flicker[ing] like a disco ball". Sigrid revealed to i-D that her and her double disagreeing with each other illustrates "when you don't really know what’s going on inside your head." Regarding the visual, Huurdeman stated that "For me it's always important to showcase a three-dimensional image of a character." Doyle called the music video "colourful", while Murray deemed it "bold". i-D's Frankie Dunn considered that "the styling provides a playful contrast to Sigrid's usual look".

Sigrid performed "Mirror" live for the first time on Later... with Jools Holland on 28 May 2021. In June of the same year, she sang it at Norwegian radio station NRK P3. Sigrid gave a performance of "Mirror" on 16 July 2021 for The One Show. On 28 August 2021, the singer sang the track at the 2021 Reading and Leeds Festival. Sigrid performed the single at Capital FM's concert Jingle Bell Ball in December 2021. "Mirror" was also included on the singer's set list at Glastonbury Festival 2022.

== Track listing ==
- Digital download
1. "Mirror" – 2:36
- Digital download (Paul Woolford Remix)
1. "Mirror (Paul Woolford Remix)" – 3:18
- Digital download (By the Piano)
1. "Mirror (By the Piano)" – 2:45
- Digital download (Zookëper Remix)
1. "Mirror (Zookëper Remix)" – 2:45
- Digital download (Kelly Lee Owens Remix)
1. "Mirror (Kelly Lee Owens Remix)" – 3:27
- Digital download (Maliboux Remix)
1. "Mirror (Maliboux Remix)" – 2:31

== Credits and personnel ==
Credits adapted from the liner notes of How to Let Go.

Recording and management

- Recorded at Sly Studio (Copenhagen, Denmark) and Gold Diggers (Los Angeles, California)
- Published by Sony Music Publishing / Sony ATV / Lions, Tigers and Songs / Havenwood House / Prescription Songs

Personnel

- Sigrid Solbakk Raabe – lead vocals, songwriter, piano
- Caroline Ailin – songwriter, vocal producer, background vocals
- Emily Warren – songwriter, background vocals
- Sylvester Willy Sivertsen – songwriter, producer, bass, drums, programming, engineering
- Josh Gudwin – mixing
- Christian Bergqvist – violin
- Iskandar Komillov – violin
- Martin Stensson – violin
- Kristina Ebbersten – violin
- Per Öman – violin
- Veronica Novotna – violin
- Ingegerd Kierkegaard – viola
- Tony Bauer – viola
- Helena Nilsson – cello
- Henrik Janson – conductor
- Ulf Janson – conductor
- John Greenham – mastering

== Charts ==
=== Weekly charts ===
Weekly chart performance for "Mirror"
Chart (2021)	Peak position
Ireland (IRMA)	76
Mexico Ingles Airplay (Billboard)	22
New Zealand Hot Singles (RMNZ)	20
Norway (VG-lista)	13
UK Singles (OCC)	49
US Dance/Mix Show Airplay (Billboard)	1

=== Year-end charts ===
2021 year-end chart performance for "Mirror"
Chart (2021)	Position
US Dance/Mix Show Airplay Songs (Billboard)	28

== Certifications ==
Region	Certification	Certified units/sales
United Kingdom (BPI)	Silver	200,000^{‡}
^{‡} Sales+streaming figures based on certification alone.

== Release history ==
Release dates and formats for "Mirror"
Region	Date	Format(s)	Version	Label(s)	Ref.
Norway	26 May 2021	Digital download; streaming	Original	Petroleum	
Various	26 May 2021	Digital download; streaming	Original	Island	
United States	1 June 2021	Dance radio	Original	Island; Republic	
Italy	11 June 2021	Radio airplay	Original	Universal	
Norway	18 June 2021	Digital download; streaming	Paul Woolford remix	Petroleum	
Various	18 June 2021	Digital download; streaming	Paul Woolford remix	Island	
Norway	25 June 2021	Digital download; streaming	Acoustic	Petroleum	
Various	25 June 2021	Digital download; streaming	Acoustic	Island	
Norway	2 July 2021	Digital download; streaming	Zookëper remix	Petroleum	
Various	2 July 2021	Digital download; streaming	Zookëper remix	Island	
Norway	9 July 2021	Digital download; streaming	Kelly Lee Owens remix	Petroleum	
Various	9 July 2021	Digital download; streaming	Kelly Lee Owens remix	Island	
Norway	16 July 2021	Digital download; streaming	Maliboux remix	Petroleum	
Various	16 July 2021	Digital download; streaming	Maliboux remix	Island	
