= Bad Life (Sigrid and Bring Me the Horizon song) =

2022 single by Sigrid and Bring Me the Horizon

Single by Sigrid and Bring Me the Horizon

from the album How to Let Go
- Released: 21 April 2022
- Genre: Pop; pop rock
- Length: 3:46
- Label: Island
- Songwriters: Sigrid Raabe; Oliver Sykes; Jordan Fish
- Producers: Zakk Cervini; Evil Twin

Sigrid singles chronology
"It Gets Dark" (2022)	"Bad Life" (2022)	"Blue" (2022)

Bring Me the Horizon singles chronology
"Fallout" (2022)	"Bad Life" (2022)	"Strangers" (2022)

Music video
- "Bad Life" on YouTube

"Bad Life" is a song by Norwegian pop singer Sigrid and British rock band Bring Me the Horizon. It was written by Sigrid Raabe, Oliver Sykes and Jordan Fish and produced by Zakk Cervini and Evil Twin. It was released as the fourth single from Sigrid's second studio album How to Let Go.

== Composition and lyrics ==
Originally written by Oliver Sykes and Jordan Fish for Bring Me the Horizon's Post Human: Survival Horror, the band decided that "Bad Life" wasn't appropriate for the record and decided to shelve the song. The band met Sigrid Raabe backstage at the Reading and Leeds Festival in 2021, finding out they were both a fan of each other's music. They felt like the song would be more appropriate for her style of music and offered her the song. Raabe accepted and rewrote the song and asked Sykes to collaborate on the track with her.

"Bad Life" is a pop and a pop rock song. It was written in the key of E major and runs at 95 BPM, composed by Raabe, Sykes and Fish while it was produced by Zakk Cervini and Evil Twin.

Speaking about "Bad Life", Raabe elaborated: "It tells the story of when things are rough and it can feel like you're never going to stop feeling sad."

== Music video ==
The music video for "Bad Life" was unveiled and published onto YouTube alongside the single on 21 April 2022 and was directed by Raja Virdi.

It is a one-shot video that stars Raabe and Sykes on each side of a worn-down house surrounded by a river performing the song.

Talking about the music video, Raabe explains:

"We knew we wanted something quite simple for the video, something that would emphasise the lyrics. We collaborated with Raja Virdi, and we ended on this dark, slightly surreal world of Oli and I on each side of a worn-down house, not knowing what the other one is going through on the other side. Oli’s such a natural performer, so I knew he’d be great anyways. I tried to treat the music video as a gig, in a way, moving up and down the stage."

Speaking about the making of the video, director Raja Virdi went on to say:

"Life can certainly feel like a rollercoaster sometimes. I wanted to represent that feeling with Sigrid and Oli performing on a theatrical, otherworldly sunken set in the middle of a vast body of water, which suddenly transforms into a stormy and thunderous surrealistic visual with the eventuality of reaching resolution."

== Track listing ==
Digital single track listing
No.	Title	Writer(s)	Length
1.	"Bad Life"	Sigrid Raabe; Oliver Sykes; Jordan Fish	3:46
2.	"Bad Life" (stripped back)	Raabe; Sykes; Fish	3:40
3.	"Bad Life" (acoustic)	Raabe; Sykes; Fish	3:40
Total length:			11:06

== Personnel ==
Credits adapted from Tidal.

Musicians

- Sigrid Raabe – lead vocals, composition, lyrics
- Oliver Sykes – lead vocals, composition, lyrics
- Jordan Fish – keyboards, programming, backing vocals, composition, lyrics
- Lee Malia – guitars
- Matt Kean – bass
- Matt Nicholls – drums

Additional personnel

- Zakk Cervini – producer
- Mark "Spike" Stent – mixing, studio personnel
- Evil Twin – producer
- John Greenham – mastering engineer, studio personnel
- Andrea Mastroiacovo – recording engineer, studio personnel

== Charts ==
=== Weekly charts ===
Weekly chart performance for "Bad Life"
Chart (2022–23)	Peak position
Belgium (Ultratop 50 Flanders)	49
Czech Republic Airplay (ČNS IFPI)	9
Germany Digital Singles (GfK)	77
Japan Hot Overseas (Billboard)	13
Mexico Ingles Airplay (Billboard)	21
Norway (VG-lista)	28
UK Singles (OCC)	50

=== Year-end charts ===
Year-end chart performance for "Bad Life"
Chart (2022)	Position
UK Top 40 Heatseekers (OCC)	35

== Certifications ==
Certifications for "Bad Life"
Region	Certification	Certified units/sales
United Kingdom (BPI)	Silver	200,000^{‡}
^{‡} Sales+streaming figures based on certification alone.
