= Sucker Punch (song) =

2018 song by Sigrid

Single by Sigrid

from the album Sucker Punch
- Released: 4 October 2018
- Studio: Ocean Sound Recording
- Genre: Power pop
- Length: 3:14
- Label: Island
- Songwriter(s): Sigrid Raabe; Martin Sjølie; Emily Warren
- Producer(s): Sjølie; Odd Martin Skalnes

Sigrid singles chronology
"Schedules" (2018)	"Sucker Punch" (2018)	"Don't Feel Like Crying" (2019)

Music video
- "Sucker Punch" on YouTube

"Sucker Punch" is a song recorded by Norwegian singer-songwriter Sigrid for her debut studio album of the same name. It was released on 4 October 2018 as the third single from the album. A power pop song, it lyrically talks about falling in love without realizing it. An accompanying music video was released on 26 October 2018. It consists of Sigrid dancing through several sequences. "Sucker Punch" was performed on Later... with Jools Holland.

== Background and composition ==
"Sucker Punch" was recorded in the singer's hometown. A power pop number, it was written by Sigrid, Martin Sjølie, and Emily Warren. It lyrically talks about falling in love without realizing it. Sigrid described the song as "a result of our usual way of working: talking, cooking, strolling, singing, dancing, experimenting."

== Music video ==
The music video for "Sucker Punch" was released on 26 October 2018. It consists of the singer dancing through several sequences, including a night, a motorway, several parties, and a running track. The video was filmed in London.

== Live performances ==
Sigrid performed "Sucker Punch" on Later... with Jools Holland.

== Track listing ==
Digital download

1. "Sucker Punch" – 3:14

Acoustic version

1. "Sucker Punch" (acoustic) – 3:57

Four Tet remix

1. "Sucker Punch" (Four Tet remix) – 4:08

== Credits and personnel ==
Adapted from Tidal.

- Sigrid – vocals, composition
- Martin Sjølie – composition, production, engineering, programming
- Emily Warren – composition
- John Hanes – mixing assistance, engineering, mix engineering
- Kim Åge Furuhaug – drums
- Thomas Stenersen – electric guitar
- Henning Svoren – engineering
- Chris Gheringer – master engineering
- Serban Ghenea – mixing, mix engineering
- Stephen Bartlett – vocal engineering, vocal production

== Charts ==
Chart (2018–19)	Peak position
Belgium (Ultratip Wallonia)	14
Ireland (IRMA)	96
Mexico Ingles Airplay (Billboard)	3
Norway (VG-lista)	12
Scotland (OCC)	59
UK Download (OCC)	49
