= Strangers (Sigrid song) =

2017 song by Sigrid

Single by Sigrid

from the album Sucker Punch
- Released: 10 November 2017
- Recorded: 2016
- Studio: Kobalt Music Group
- Genre: Synth-pop; electropop
- Length: 3:53
- Label: Island Records; Universal Music Group
- Songwriters: Sigrid Solbakk Raabe; Martin Sjølie
- Producer: Martin Sjølie

Sigrid singles chronology
"Plot Twist" (2017)	"Strangers" (2017)	"Raw" (2018)

Music video
- "Strangers" on YouTube

"Strangers" is a song performed by Norwegian singer and songwriter Sigrid. The song was released as a digital download on 10 November 2017 by Island Records. The song peaked at number six on the Norwegian Singles Chart. Outside Norway, the single topped the charts in Scotland and Croatia and peaked within the top ten of the charts in the Republic of Ireland and the United Kingdom. The song was included on the singer's debut album, Sucker Punch, serving as the second single from the project.

== Music video ==
An official music video for "Strangers" was directed by Ivana Bobic for Riff Raff Films. It was first released onto YouTube on 30 November 2017, with a length of four minutes and four seconds. As of 19 May 2026, it has gained over 74 million views.

== Track listing ==
Digital download
No.	Title	Length
1.	"Strangers"	3:53

Digital download – remixes
No.	Title	Length
1.	"Strangers" (R3hab Remix)	2:31
2.	"Strangers" (Franky Rizardo Remix)	4:40
3.	"Strangers" (acoustic)	3:23
4.	"Strangers" (TIEKS Remix)	3:17
5.	"Strangers" (Jonas Blue Remix)	3:12

== Charts ==
=== Weekly charts ===
Chart (2017–18)	Peak position
Belgium (Ultratip Bubbling Under Flanders)	25
Belgium (Ultratip Bubbling Under Wallonia)	16
Croatia (HRT)	1
Euro Digital Songs (Billboard)	3
Iceland (RÚV)	16
Ireland (IRMA)	7
Israel (Media Forest)	10
New Zealand Heatseekers (RMNZ)	6
Norway (VG-lista)	6
Poland Airplay (ZPAV)	33
Scottish Singles Sales (Official Charts)	1
UK Singles (Official Charts)	10

=== Year-end charts ===
Chart (2018)	Position
UK Singles (OCC)	64

== Certifications ==
Region	Certification	Certified units/sales
New Zealand (RMNZ)	Gold	15,000^{‡}
Norway (IFPI Norway)	2× Platinum	120,000^{‡}
United Kingdom (BPI)	Platinum	600,000^{‡}
^{‡} Sales+streaming figures based on certification alone.

== Release history ==
Region	Date	Format	Label
United Kingdom	10 November 2017	Digital download	Island; Universal Music Group
