= Michelle Leonard =

British musician, born 1973

- Born: 5 June 1973 (age 51); Soost, Germany
- Origin: Germany
- Genres: Pop, rock, punk, electro
- Occupation(s): Singer, songwriter
- Instrument(s): singing, keyboards, programming
- Years active: 1990–present
- Labels: Universal Music Publishing, BMG Rights Management

Michelle Leonard (born 5 June 1973) is a German / British singer and songwriter, now based in Berlin. Leonard has written and co-written multiple songs, both singles and for albums, that have achieved gold and platinum status. Leonard is known internationally for her work with AURORA and Paul van Dyk, as well as for her collaboration with Robin Schulz (under the stage name Solamay). As a songwriter, Leonard is currently signed to Budde Music Publishing.

== Biography ==
Leonard grew up in Germany, where she attended British schools. EMI Music Publishing signed her when she was 17. She had just released her first single at 16, which was a cover version of "Falling," a 1990 song by Julee Cruise that later became popular as the Twin Peaks theme song.

Leonard's first original songs included "Feel So Perfect," which was released by Cape, became a radio hit, and was used for a three-year, pan-European C&A advertising campaign. Multiple music videos and short films were created around the song. Many of her co-written songs have been used in advertisements for companies including Axe, RMS (Radio marketing services), Ford Ka and Vodafone Germany.

Some of Leonard's biggest songwriting hits have been performed by other artists. Her greatest achievements in this field have included AURORA's "Running with the Wolves," "Rooftop" by Nico Santos, and "Love Is You" by Thomas Godoj. In 2005, Leonard also worked on the song "Instant Replay" with Such a Surge, which was released on their album Alpha.

Leonard was also the performance and music director for the German Theatre Abroad project in New York and directed the musical "Electric Society," which was staged on 12 November 2005 in Cologne, Germany. In 2009, she was a judge on the German casting television show Popstars and released her debut album Fragile.

Since 2005, Leonard has been a lecturer at the Popakademie (University of Popular Music and Music Business), the Columbia College Chicago, and at the SRH Hochschule der populären Künste (College of Popular Arts) in Germany for Songwriting. In 2011, Leonard started the co-publishing company "DOLSIRA" with Universal Music Publishing, Germany, and in 2018, started "EERA" in cooperation with BMG Rights Management. In 2015, she started her own solo-artist project, Solamay, which has achieved platinum status.

== Discography ==
=== As songwriter ===
Year	Title Album	Chart Position								Comment
Year	Title Album	DE	AUT	CH	FIN	SWE	UK	US	NO	Comment
2002	Hurra, Hurra, die Schule brennt Busted – Busted (Album)	19 (7 weeks)	20 (8 weeks)	34 (5 weeks.)						Translation work
2004	Save My Life Tonight Hanna Pakarinen – When I Become Me (Album)				2 (17 weeks)					
2005	Out Of Tears Hanna Pakarinen – Stronger (Album)				2 (7 weeks)					
2005	Virus Nu Pagadi – Your Dark Side (Album)	1 (12 weeks)	5 (10 weeks)	6 (9 weeks)						
2005	Sag Mir Wann Nikko Weidemann- Perfekte Welle Compilation (Album)									
2006	Celebrity Queen Alexander Klaws – Attention! (Album)	20 (3 weeks)	19	48						
2006	Der Turm Joachim Witt – Bayreuth 3 [Limited Edition] (Album)	35 (3 weeks)								
2006	Don't Let It Get You Down Mike Leon Grosch– Don't Let It Get You Down (Single)	1 (11 weeks)	6 (10 weeks)	2 (14 weeks)						
2006	Don't Let It Get You Down This Ride Mike Leon Grosch– Absolute (Album)	2 (12 weeks)	12 (4 weeks)	6 (8 weeks)						
2006	Living Without You, It's Over, Venom, Occupied, Tattooed On Me Sandy Mölling – Frame Of Mind (Album)	36								
2006	Dangerzone Vanilla Ninja – Dangerzone (Single)	21 (9 weeks)	23 (6 weeks)	18 (8 weeks)						
2006	Dangerzone, Kingdom Burning Down, The Band That Never, Existed Rockstarz, Battlefield, Insane in Vain, Silence, Love Is Just A War, My Name Vanilla Ninja – Love Is War (Album)	16 (5 weeks)	29 (3 weeks)	14 (9 weeks)						EE No. 1
2006	You And Me, Cruel To Myself Hell Yeah Valentine – Blue Merry-Go-Round (Album)									
2007	Lovesongs (They Kill Me) Cinema Bizarre – Lovesongs (They Kill Me) (Single)	9 (9 weeks)	32 (8 weeks)							FR No. 28 (19 weeks)
2007	Lovesongs (They Kill Me), Get Off, Heaven Sent Cinema Bizarre – Final Attraction (Album)	9 (1 week)	28 (2 weeks)							FR No. 24 (9 weeks) IT No. 30 (9 weeks)
2007	If I Lose You Lisa Bund – Born Again (Album)	27 (2 weeks)	66 (1 week)	88 (1 week)						
2007	Life Is A Miracle No Angels – "Kleiner Dodo" Soundtrack (Album)									Title track of the Warner Bros. Movie Kleiner Dodo
2007	Großstadtkinder, Jenny Peilomat– Großstadtkinder									
2007	Lost Northern Star, Ciárans Well, Calling Grace Tarja Turunen – My Winter Storm (Album)	3 (4 weeks)	11 (4 weeks)	15 (9 weeks)	1 (9 weeks)	41 (1 week)				NO No. 37 (1 week) SP No. 77 (1 week) FR No. 88 (1 week)
2007	Superstar, I Am Not Afraid Orange Blue – Superstar (Album)	88 (1 week)								
2007	Atomic Love, Another Day Nouveau Riche – Pink Trash (Album)									
2007	Various Songs Sistanova									
2008	Stay With Me Jesus on Extasy – Stay With Me (Single)	1 (Alternative Charts)								
2008	Love Is You Thomas Godoj – Love Is You (Single)	1 (13 weeks)	1 (12 weeks)	1 (11 weeks)						
2008	Love Is You, Too Young To Grow Old, Summer Breeze, Brand New Start Thomas Godoj – Plan A! (Album)	1 (25 weeks)	1 (8 weeks)	3 (11 weeks)						
2009	No More Days To Waste Aloha from Hell – No More Days To Waste (Single)	59 (4 weeks)								JP No. 11
2009	Blown Away Oliver Wimmer – Blown Away (Single)		1 (10 weeks)							CH Airplay Charts No. 1
2009	Little Riding Hood Rap Sarah Brightman – Little Riding Hood Rap (Single)									
2009	Touching And Kissing, My Obsession, Je Ne Regrette Rien, In Your Cage, Heaven Is Wrapped in Chains, I Don't Wanna Know (If You Got Laid), Out Of Love, Sad Day (For Happiness), Tears in Vegas Cinema Bizarre – ToyZ / BANG (Album)	24 (1 week)	44 (1 week)							FR No. 79 (3 weeks) IT No. 36 (3 weeks) NL No. 94 (1 week)
2009	Love in a Million Shades Hanna Pakarinen – Love in a Million Shades (Album)				7 (5 weeks)					
2009	Enough Tarja Turunen – My Winter Storm [Limited Fan Edition] (Album)									
2009	Tired Again Stanfour – Zweiohrküken(Soundtrack)	6 (16 weeks)	15 (9 weeks)	56 (7 weeks)						
2010	I Can't Dance Alone Giovanni feat. Ross Antony – I Can't Dance Alone (Single)	26 (7 weeks)	49 (4 weeks)							
2010	Anteroom Of Death, I Feel Immortal, Until My Last Breath Crying Moon Tarja Turunen – What Lies Beneath (Album)	4 (5 weeks)	12 (6 weeks)	11 (4 weeks)	7 (7 weeks)	45 (Sweden Album Charts) (1 week)	11 (UK Rock Chart)	24 (US Top Heatseekers)		Reached Chart positions in 18 countries (e.g. IT, CZ, HUN, RUS, PL, NL, BEL, MEX)
2010	Stay With Me Jesus on Extasy – Beloved Enemy (Album)									
2010	An Le Chang Zan Gary Cheng									Cantonese version of "I'm A Big Girl Now"
2010	Born To Feel Alive Gregorian – The Dark Side of the Chant (Album)	7 (13 weeks)	11 (16 weeks)	20 (14 weeks)						First English version of the song "Geboren um zu leben" by the German group Unheilig, DK No. 9 (6 weeks)
2010	Carry Me Home Sarah Connor – Real Love (Album)	8 (8 weeks)	15 (4 weeks)	22 (4 weeks)						
2011	Undercover Frida Gold – Juwel (Album)	14 (38 weeks)		59 (2 weeks)						
2011	Daddy Marla Glen – Humanology (Album)									
2011	Down The Hole And Back 3D Bertil Mark – Insight Outside (Earbook)									
2011	Carry Me Home Grant Smillie feat. Zoë Badwi – Carry Me Home (Single)									ARIA Club Charts No. 16, Album "Zoë" hit No. 36 in AU Album Chart
2011	Ich Sehe Dich Uwe Ochsenknecht – Das Große Comeback (Soundtrack)									Titelsong des ZDF TV Films Das große Comeback
2011	Sam Na Sveta Toma feat. Billy Hlapeto – Sam Na Sveta (Single)									BG No. 7
2012	Du Fölier Väl Med Lena Philipsson – Du Fölier Väl Med (Single)					4				
2012	Du Fölier Väl Med Lena Philipsson – Världen snurrar (Album)					4				
2012	Lost in Berlin Love Ammunition Paul van Dyk (feat. Michelle Leonard) – Evolution (Album)									
2012	Lost in Berlin (Giuseppe Ottaviani Remix) Paul van Dyk (feat. Michelle Leonard) – Vonic Sessions 2012 (Album)	22 (4 weeks)		49 (2 weeks)						NL No. 78 (1 weeks)
2012	Anteroom Of Death, Lost Northern Star, Ciarans Well Taja Turunen – Tarja Act 1 (Live Album & DVD)	5 (4 weeks)	36 (1 week)	48 (1 week)	12 (3 weeks)					FR No. 147, BE No. 99, FI No. 12
2012	The Knife, Beat The Winter Mikko Sipola – Making A Sound				5					
2012	Shooting Stars Kindervater – Future Trance Vol.61 (Compilation)	3 (Compilation Charts)	2 (12 weeks)	5 (8 weeks)						
2012	Shooting Stars Kindervater – Dream Dance Vol.65 (Compilation)	6 (Compilation Charts)	12 (2 weeks)	7 (6 weeks)						
2012	Army Of Hope Michael Schulte – Wide Awake (Album)	54 (1 week)								
2012	Gloria Joachim Witt – Gloria (Single)	74 (2 weeks)								
2012	Gloria, Jetzt Geh, Tränen, Blut, Königreich, Beben, Licht Im Ozean, Komm Nie Wieder Zurück, Leichtsinn, Untergehen Joachim Witt – DOM (Album)	6 (6 weeks)	43 (1 week)	68 (1 week)						DE Alternative Charts No. 1
2012	Brave It Out Generations – Brave It Out (Single)									Title track of the Japanese NTV Drama "Sugarless", JP # 5 Hot 100 Official Billboard, No. 9 Top 100 Airplay No. 4 Adult Contemporary Airplay, No. 6 Hot Single Sales, No. 3 Oricon Single Charts
2013	Carry Me Michael Mind Project – State Of Mind (Album)	53 (3 weeks)	43 (3 weeks)							
2013	Kein Rausch Betty Dittrich – Gute Jungs, böse Mädchen (Album)									
2013	Lock U in a Rocket, Love Love Love Zibbz – Ready? Go! (Album)			14 (4 weeks)						
2013	Gotta Remember To Forget You Angy – Drama Queen (Album)									SP No. 30 (1 week)
2013	Recognise Me Sofi de la Torre – Rubinrot (Soundtrack)									
2013	Zu Ende Mega Mega – Behalt Die Nerven (Album)									
2013	Grüne Welle MC Fitti feat. Bonnie Strange – Geilon (Album)	2 (11 weeks)								
2013	Snapshot f(x) – Pink Tape (Album)							21 (US Heatseekers Albums – Billboard)		Billboard World Album Charts No. 1, KR No. 1, JP No. 30
2013	Gloria Gregorian – Masters Of Chant 9 (Album)	14 (13 weeks)	16 (4 weeks)	29 (8 weeks)						
2013	Brave It Out Generations – Generations (Album)									JP No. 1
2014	Spät, Hoping (feat. Lisa Gerrard) Joachim Witt – Neumond (Album)	8 (4 weeks)								
2015	Schlachtbank Eisbrecher – Schock (Album)	2 (33 weeks)	11 (3 weeks)	16 (3 weeks)						
2015	Hearts Are Digital, Burn/fear, Electric, Angel, Just An Illusion, Lovers When It's Cold, Glory, The Matrix, Not My God, Metropolis, You Can't Save Me, (In Your) Waiting Room Jack Strify – Illusion (Album)									
2015	Gentle Gregorian – Masters Of Chant X– The Final Chapter (Album)	8 (11 weeks)	54 (2 weeks)	25 (5 weeks)						
2015	Let's Die Together, Radio Song, There Was A Time Russkaja – Peace, Love & Russian Roll (Album)		42 (1 week)							
2015	Running with the Wolves Aurora – Running with the Wolves (EP)					5 (Aqua Charts)				Title track Vodafone Campaign Germany, UK Mix Charts No. 5, NO Dance Charts No. 18
2016	UFO Alex Mattson feat. Solamay – UFO (Single)				10 (6 weeks)					
2016	Running with the Wolves, Warrior, Eyes of a Child, Wisdom Cries Aurora – All My Demons Greeting Me As A Friend (Album)	24 (4 weeks)	50	41			28	150		NO No. 1 IE No. 66 NL No. 17 AU No. 67
2016	Recognise Me Sofi de la Torre – Smaragdgrün (Soundtrack)									Original Motion Picture Soundtrack "Emerald Green" (Film/DVD Charts DE #3)
2017	Jealousy Alice Merton – No Roots (EP)	5	3					14 (Billboard Top Alternative Albums)		Billboard US Top Rock Albums No. 30
2017	My Girls, Bff, Vergiss Mein Nicht Hanni & Nanni – Mehr Als Beste Freunde (Film Soundtrack)									
2017	Charming Horses Remix Edit Jam feat. Solamay – Invaded (EP)									
2017	Hey Road, Send You An Angel, Still in Love, Volle Kraft Voraus Russkja – Kosmopoliturbo (Album)		27 (1 week)							
2017	Krieger, Alle in Einem Boot, Wo Geht Der Teufel Hin, Herz Auf, Der Wahnsinn Eisbrecher – Strumfahrt (Album)	1 (9 weeks)	10	8						
2017	Killin' It Laz Perkins feat. Mad Ice & Bang for the Buck – Killin' It (Single)									
2017	Rooftop Nico Santos – Rooftop (Single)	5 (32 weeks)	2 (24 weeks)	5 (29 weeks)						DE Airplay Charts No. 1
2017	Herzstreik Alina – Die Einzige (Album)	26 (12 weeks)		100 (1 week)						
2017	Taboo Moody – Taboo (Single)									
2018	Liebe Ist Safe Glasperlenspiel – Licht & Schatten (Album)	5 (10 weeks)								
2018	Dig Deep Lxandra – Dig Deep (Single)									
2018	Trick Nicki & Freddi & The Sixties – Ku'damm 59 (Soundtrack)									Original Motion Picture Soundtrack "Ku'damm 59"
2018	Never Let You Down Michael Schulte – Never Let You Down (Single)									
2018	Not Yours Halie – Not Yours (Single)									
2018	Rooftop, Heatwave Nico Santos – Streets Of Gold (Album)	25 (3 weeks)	69 (1 week)	29 (2 weeks)						
2019	Honeymoon Heartbreak Alice Merton – Mint	2 (7 weeks)	19 (1 week)	21 (1 week)						IT No. 62 (2 weeks)
2019	The Seed Aurora - A Different Kind Of Human (Step 2)	58 (1 week)	66 (1 week)	54 (1 week)						NO No. 4 (5 weeks), BE No. 172 (1 week)
	Solitary Soul Michael Leonardi – Solitary Soul (Album)									
2024	The Essence, When The Dark Dresses Lightly, Starvation, The Blade Aurora – What Happened to the Heart (Album)	5 (8 weeks in Germany)	15 (5 weeks in Austria)	18 (4 weeks in Switzerland)	20 (3 weeks in Finland)	10 (6 weeks in Sweden)	22 (2 weeks in the UK)		3 (12 weeks in Norway)	
2025	Wankelmut, Emma Wells - Sun Goes Down (Single)									

Year	Title Album	Chart Position							Comment
Year	Title Album	DE	AUT	CH	FIN	SWE	UK	US	Comment
2009	Fragile								Debut album

==== Singles ====
Year	Title Single	Chart Position							Comment
Year	Title Single	DE	AUT	CH	FIN	SWE	UK	US	Comment
2009	Where Did We Go Wrong	6 (16 weeks)	15 (9 weeks)	56 (7 weeks)					(Soundtrack "Zweiohrküken")
