= Don't Feel Like Crying =

2019 single by Sigrid

Single by Sigrid

from the album Sucker Punch
- Released: 17 January 2019
- Genre: Pop
- Length: 2:37
- Label: Island
- Songwriter(s): Sigrid Raabe; Oscar Holter; Emily Warren
- Producer(s): Oscar Holter

Sigrid singles chronology
"Sucker Punch" (2018)	"Don't Feel Like Crying" (2019)	"Mine Right Now" (2019)

Music video
- "Don't Feel Like Crying" on YouTube

"Don't Feel Like Crying" is a song by Norwegian singer-songwriter Sigrid, recorded for her debut studio album, Sucker Punch (2019). It was released on 17 January 2019 as the record's fourth single. A pop break-up anthem, its lyrics discuss moving through a breakup positively and postponing heartbreak. The track received positive reviews from music critics for its encouraging message. Sigrid performed "Don't Feel Like Crying" on The Late Show with Stephen Colbert.

== Background and composition ==
Speaking about the song, Sigrid stated "There's a certain grace to heartache. A sort of...epic grace! I like good, heartfelt pop songs." The song was written by Sigrid, Emily Warren, and Oscar Holter, the latter of whom also produced the track.

"Don't Feel Like Crying" is a pop break-up anthem composed of orchestral stabs and slick vocal effects. In his album review of Sucker Punch, Neil Garcia of Exclaim! compared the song to the works of Carly Rae Jepsen. Lyrically, the single discusses moving through a breakup positively and postponing heartbreak. In the pre-chorus, the singer belts "Wallowing in it would be such a waste. That isn't gonna fix it anyway."

== Critical reception ==
Nick Reilly of NME called the single "one of [Sigrid's] most emotionally resilient tracks yet." Mike Wass of Idolator wrote that few songs "tap into the emotional amnesia before the inevitable meltdown as honestly as 'Don't Feel Like Crying.'" DIY magazine labelled the song "another feel-good offering from the singer."

== Live performances ==
Sigrid performed "Don't Feel Like Crying" on The Late Show with Stephen Colbert on 19 February 2019.

== Track listing ==
Digital download

1. "Don't Feel Like Crying" – 2:37

MK Remix

1. "Don't Feel Like Crying" (MK Remix) – 3:40
2. "Don't Feel Like Crying" (MK Extended Remix) – 7:13

== Personnel ==
Adapted from Tidal.

- Sigrid – lead artist, songwriter
- Emily Warren – songwriter
- Oscar Holter – producer, songwriter, bass guitar, keyboards, drums, programmer
- Martin Sjølie – assistant producer
- Mattias Bylund – strings
- Mattias Johansson – violin
- David Bukovinszky – cello
- Chris Gehringer – mastering engineer, studio personnel
- Serban Ghenea – mixing engineer, studio personnel

== Charts ==
=== Weekly charts ===
Chart (2019)	Peak position
China Airplay/FL (Billboard)	36
Croatia (HRT)	16
Ireland (IRMA)	16
Netherlands (Tipparade)	13
New Zealand Hot Singles (RMNZ)	34
Norway (VG-lista)	22
Scotland (OCC)	12
UK Singles (OCC)	13
US Dance Club Songs (Billboard)	8
US Dance/Mix Show Airplay (Billboard)	23

=== Year-end charts ===
Chart (2019)	Position
UK Singles (Official Charts Company)	91

== Certifications ==
Region	Certification	Certified units/sales
United Kingdom (BPI)	Platinum	600,000^{‡}
^{‡} Sales+streaming figures based on certification alone.
