= How to Let Go =

Studio album by Sigrid
- Released: 6 May 2022
- Recorded: 2020–2022
- Genre: Dance-pop; pop
- Length: 37:30
- Label: Island
- Producer: Askjell; Evil Twin; John Hill; Martin Sjølie; Sly

Sigrid chronology
Sucker Punch (2019)	How to Let Go (2022)	The Hype (2023)

Singles from How to Let Go
- 1. "Mirror" Released: 26 May 2021; 2. "Burning Bridges" Released: 25 August 2021; 3. "It Gets Dark" Released: 9 March 2022; 4. "Bad Life" Released: 21 April 2022

How to Let Go is the second studio album by Norwegian singer-songwriter Sigrid, released on 6 May 2022 through Island Records. The album serves as the follow-up to Sigrid's debut album, Sucker Punch (2019). The album was promoted by the singles "Mirror", "Burning Bridges", "It Gets Dark", and "Bad Life" with British rock band Bring Me the Horizon.

== Background ==
After a one and a half year hiatus, Sigrid came back when she released "Mirror" on 26 May 2021, which was later followed by releasing "Burning Bridges" on 25 August that year. On 5 November 2021, she released a Christmas version of her 2019 track "Home to You" then recorded for a soundtrack to The Aeronauts. The Christmas version was titled "Home to You (This Christmas)". On 19 January 2022, she released a collaboration track with English singer-songwriter Griff marking their first collaboration., however this song is not included Sigrid's second studio album. After the release of "It Gets Dark" on 9 March 2022, Sigrid announced that her second studio album would be released on 6 May 2022 and also shared the album's cover and track list via her social media.

== Singles ==
"Mirror", described as a "self-acceptance anthem", was released as the lead single from the album on 26 May 2021. Commercially, it reached number 13 in the singer's home country. Outside of Norway, the song peaked at number 76 in Ireland and 49 in United Kingdom respectively.

"Burning Bridges" was released as the second single on 25 August 2021. After its release the song was premiered on BBC Radio 1 as residency host Charli XCX's Hottest Record, with Sigrid explaining the meaning of the song as "that moment when you know you have to let go [...] and when you are listening to the song, I'm cool with it being anything you want it to be".

"It Gets Dark", the third single from the album, was released on 9 March 2022, being Sigrid's first solo track released in 2022. The track was premiered on Clara Amfo's BBC Radio 1 show as the Hottest Record in the World. This song which pays tribute to both the highs and lows of life. The single got a new life worldwide after it was featured in the animated teen comedy movie Ruby Gillman, Teenage Kraken.

"Bad Life", a collaboration with British rock band Bring Me the Horizon was released as the fourth single on 21 April 2022. It marks the first collaboration between singer and the band, but it also marks the first collaboration with another artist in Sigrid's projects.

== Critical reception ==
Professional ratings
Aggregate scores
Source	Rating
AnyDecentMusic?	7.1/10
Metacritic	77/100
Review scores
Source	Rating
AllMusic	4.5/5 stars
Clash	8/10
DIY	3.5/5 stars
Gigwise	7/10 stars
The Independent	4/5 stars
The Line of Best Fit	8/10
NME	4/5 stars
NRK P3	5/6
Pitchfork	5.4/10
The Skinny	4/5 stars

How to Let Go received generally positive reviews from music critics. At Metacritic, which assigns a normalised rating out of 100 to reviews from mainstream critics, the album received an average score of 77, based on 9 reviews, which indicates "generally favorable reviews".

Writing for AllMusic Neil Z. Yeung called the album "refreshing and even more insightful than her debut" and also states that "the growing artist opts for the positive, affirmative route with the songs on How to Let Go, which merges shimmering dance-pop gems and arena-sized midtempo ballads" adding that this project is a "more established act".

The Clash's Gem Stokes notes that How to Let Go is a record of self-empowerment reading as Sigrid's own personal journal detailing episodes of growth and lessons in love [with] Sigrid renounces her past self in favour of growth and is inspiring others to do the same."

David Roskin from Gigwise gave the album rating 7 out of 10 stars and wrote that How to Let Go "might be a collection of pop bangers, dipping into folk and disco, but above all, it’s Sigrid’s bold and brash journey to freedom."

Izzy Sigston of The Line of Best Fit described the project as "a patchwork quilt of organic growth and reflection" and states that "Sigrid continues to set souls on fire with her progressive yet instantly distinguishable album.

NME's Nick Levine rated the album 4 out of 5 stars and said, "If How to Let Go is an album about embracing life in all its chaotic and contradictory glory, it’s surely a testament to its success that the record feels so life-affirming. Like the best pop music, it feels like someone’s reached out to say they know exactly how you feel."

The Skinny writer Cheri Amour said that "Unlike fellow Nordic peer Aurora, How to Let Go isn’t a collection of Mother Earth cries. This record positions Sigrid as an alumna of fellow chart-topper Dua Lipa or even wannabe rock 'n' roller Miley Cyrus."

In a mixed review for DIY Bethan Harper writes that "The core theme of How to Let Go becomes apparent: throughout the album Sigrid is colliding with herself, accepting everything she is, the light and the dark. At times she is the unabashed pop star who takes huge stages in her stride".

Pitchfork's Shaad D'Souza compared at least three of the songs on the album to that of contemporary artist Ava Max's 2020 song My Head & My Heart.

== Track listing ==
All tracks are written by Sigrid Solbakk Raabe, Sylvester Sivertsen, and Caroline Ailin, excepted where noted. All tracks are produced by Sly, except where noted.

How to Let Go track listing
No.	Title	Writer(s)	Producer(s)	Length
1.	"It Gets Dark"	Sigrid Raabe; Sylvester Sivertsen; Emily Warren		3:23
2.	"Burning Bridges"			2:52
3.	"Risk of Getting Hurt"			3:00
4.	"Thank Me Later"			3:30
5.	"Mirror"	Raabe; Sivertsen; Ailin; Warren		2:36
6.	"Last to Know"		Sly; Askjell	3:12
7.	"Dancer"			2:46
8.	"A Driver Saved My Night"			2:47
9.	"Mistake Like You"	Raabe; Warren; Martin Sjølie	Sly; Sjølie; Ailin^{[a]}	3:31
10.	"Bad Life" (with Bring Me the Horizon)	Raabe; Oliver Sykes; Jordan Fish	Evil Twin; Zakk Cervini^{[a]}	3:46
11.	"Grow"	Raabe; John Hill; Sarah Aarons	Sly; Hill	3:14
12.	"High Note"	Raabe; Sivertsen; Ailin; Andreas Lund		2:53
Total length:				37:30

Apple Music edition
No.	Title	Writer(s)	Length
13.	"Lost" (Apple Music home session)	Christopher Breaux; James Ho; Micah Otano; Edwin Paul Shelton II	3:25
14.	"It Gets Dark" (Apple Music home session)	Raabe; Sivertsen; Warren	2:44
15.	"Bad Habits" (Apple Music home session)	Ed Sheeran; Fred Gibson; Johnny McDaid	3:44
16.	"Mirror" (Apple Music home session)	Raabe; Sivertsen; Ailin; Warren	2:44
Total length:			49:27

Special edition
No.	Title	Writer(s)	Producer	Length
7.	"Blue"	Raabe; Odd Martin	Martin	3:27
8.	"Everybody Says They're Fine"	Raabe; Brett Leland; Ailin; Sivertsen	Sly	2:31

Notes

- ^{^[a]} indicates an additional producer
- Track 13, "Lost", is a cover of the song performed by Frank Ocean, from the album Channel Orange (2012)
- Track 15, "Bad Habits", is a cover of the song performed by Ed Sheeran, from the album = (2021)

== Personnel ==
Musicians

- Sigrid Solbakk Raabe – vocals (all tracks), piano (1, 2, 5, 7, 11), synthesizer (1), keyboards (2), guitar (3)
- Sly – drums (1, 3–5, 7–9, 12), keyboards (1–4, 8, 9, 12), programming (1–5, 7–9, 11, 12), bass (2, 5), background vocals (3)
- Emily Warren – background vocals (1, 5)
- Andreas Lund – bass (1, 7, 9, 12), guitar (1–4, 7–9, 11, 12)
- Caroline Ailin – background vocals (2–5, 7, 8, 12)
- Henrik Janson – conductor, piano (2, 5)
- Ulf Janson – conductor, piano (2, 5)
- Helena Nilsson – cello (2, 5)
- Simon Rossen – drums (2, 4)
- Ingegerd Kierkegaard – viola (2, 5)
- Tony Bauer – viola (2, 5)
- Christian Bergqvist – violin (2, 5)
- Iskanadar Komilov – violin (2, 5)
- Kristina Ebbersten – violin (2, 5)
- Martin Stensson – violin (2, 5)
- Per Öman – violin (2, 5)
- Veronica Novotna – violin (2, 5)
- Askjell – piano (6)
- Oliver Sykes – vocals (10)
- Jordan Fish – background vocals, keyboards, programming (10)
- Matthew Kean – bass (10)
- Matthew Nicholls – drums (10)
- Lee Malia – guitar (10)
- John Hill – 12-string acoustic guitar, guitar (11)
- Sarah Aarons – background vocals (11)

Technical

- John Greenham – mastering
- Mark "Spike" Stent – mixing (1–3, 6, 7, 9–12)
- Josh Gudwin – mixing (4, 5, 8)
- Sly – engineering (1–5, 7–9, 11, 12), vocal production (2–4, 6–9, 11, 12)
- Mike Hartung – engineering (3, 6, 8, 11)
- Andrea Mastroiacovo – engineering (10)
- Rob Cohen – engineering, vocal production (11)
- Caroline Ailin – vocal production (2–9, 12)

== Charts ==
Chart performance for How to Let Go
Chart (2022)	Peak position
Australian Hitseekers Albums (ARIA)	15
Belgian Albums (Ultratop Flanders)	100
German Albums (Offizielle Top 100)	61
Irish Albums (IRMA)	11
Norwegian Albums (VG-lista)	1
Scottish Albums (OCC)	4
Swiss Albums (Schweizer Hitparade)	73
UK Albums (OCC)	2
US Heatseekers Albums (Billboard)	23
US Current Album Sales (Billboard)	77

== Certifications ==
Certifications for How to Let Go
Region	Certification	Certified units/sales
United Kingdom (BPI)	Silver	60,000^{‡}
^{‡} Sales+streaming figures based on certification alone.

== Release history ==
Release dates and formats for How to Let Go
Region	Date	Format	Label	Ref.
Various	6 May 2022	CD; LP; cassette	Island	
Various	6 May 2022	Digital download; streaming	Island	
