= Sucker Punch (Sigrid album) =

Studio album by Sigrid
- Released: 8 March 2019
- Recorded: 2016–2018
- Genre: Pop; electropop; synth-pop
- Length: 40:23
- Label: Island
- Producer: Martin Sjølie; Odd Martin Skålnes; Oscar Holter; Askjell Solstrand; Patrik Berger; Martin Stilling

Sigrid chronology
Raw (2018)	Sucker Punch (2019)	How to Let Go (2022)

Singles from Sucker Punch
- 1. "Don't Kill My Vibe" Released: 10 February 2017; 2. "Strangers" Released: 10 November 2017; 3. "Sucker Punch" Released: 4 October 2018; 4. "Don't Feel Like Crying" Released: 17 January 2019; 5. "Sight of You" Released: 28 February 2019; 6. "Mine Right Now" Released: 3 May 2019

Sucker Punch is the debut studio album by Norwegian singer Sigrid, released on 8 March 2019 through Island Records. It follows the release of Sigrid's 2018 EP Raw. None of the songs featured on Raw were included on the album; however, two were included from Sigrid's debut EP Don't Kill My Vibe (2017). Sigrid enlisted collaborators Martin Sjølie, Odd Martin Skålnes, Oscar Holter, Askjell Solstrand, Patrik Berger, and Martin Stilling for the album's production. The result was a pop, electropop, and synth-pop record described by music critics as exploring both mainstream and indie pop musical styles.

Sucker Punch was met with positive reviews from music critics, many of whom praised its cohesion and empowering lyrics. Commercially, the album topped the Norwegian albums chart in its first week, while also reaching the top five in Ireland, Scotland, and the United Kingdom, in addition to attaining modest positions on several European charts. The album has been promoted by the singles "Don't Kill My Vibe", "Strangers", "Sucker Punch", "Don't Feel Like Crying", "Sight of You" and "Mine Right Now".

== Background ==
Following an EP Raw (2018), Sigrid rose to international prominence after the release of her hit "Don't Kill My Vibe" in February 2017 and winning the BBC Music Sound of 2018 award in January 2018. Speaking about the album, she stated, "I figured out early on that it's gonna be difficult for me to try and be anything other than who I am. I always said if I'm gonna do this it's easiest to be myself and look like myself, where I can recognise myself." On 31 January 2019, Sigrid revealed the album's track list via Twitter. The album was released on March 8.

== Composition ==
Sucker Punch is a pop, electropop, and synth-pop album that has been described as navigating "the space between Top 40 success and indie pop credibility". The album opens with the title track, a power pop number that lyrically is about falling in love without realizing it. Kitty Richardson of The Line of Best Fit called the song a "crush" anthem with "fat synths" and a chorus featuring the singer's falsetto. "Mine Right Now" is a 1980s-inspired song about living in the moment in a relationship without any future. "Basic" is an upbeat dance number that leads to a stripped-down, lo-fi bridge containing tender piano chords. Lyrically, the song explores themes of uncertainty and self-doubt and has been described as a "vulnerable, imperfect peek behind the curtain". Thomas Smith of NME described the song as a "knowing-nod to her perceived girl-next-door image". Second single "Strangers" is a synth-pop song that has musically been compared to the works of Robyn. "Don't Feel Like Crying" is a break-up anthem composed of orchestral stabs and slick vocal effects, which has drawn comparisons to the works of Carly Rae Jepsen. "Level Up" is an indie pop number that contains a delicate acoustic guitar line, preceded by an introduction of violins and succeeded by an unpredictable melody in the chorus.

"Sight of You" is an anthem driven by a staccato string section that lyrically discusses "the sea of adoration that awaits [Sigrid] on stage". Harriet Linnell, writing for Drowned in Sound, labelled the song "a sequel to ABBA's 'Super Trouper', with similar instrumentation and theme". "In Vain" begins with a "barebones guitar and vocal approach" before leading to an anthemic climax. The song features raw vocals from the singer. "Don't Kill My Vibe" is a pop song containing "crashing carnival drums, frantic claps and Sigrid's fearless holler". The song was lyrically inspired by the singer's experiences feeling belittled by producers during a writing session. "Business Dinners" was written as a response to an experience meeting with labels in London when Sigrid was a teenager. Musically, the song contains "heavy-handed" production. "Never Mine" is a synth-led lament about a past relationship. Kitty Richardson of The Line of Best Fit referred to it as one of the only "genuinely sad" songs on the album. The album's closing track, "Dynamite", is an introspective piano ballad about the "realization that self-worth is more important than a failing relationship".

== Singles ==
"Don't Kill My Vibe" was released as the lead single from the album on 10 February 2017. It was also included on the singer's debut EP of the same name. Commercially, it reached number 28 in the singer's home country. Outside of Norway, the song reached the top twenty in Scotland. "Strangers" was released as the second single on 10 November 2017. The song reached number one in Croatia and Scotland, while peaking within the top ten of the charts in Ireland, Norway, and the United Kingdom. The album's title track was released as the third single on 4 October 2018. It reached number 12 in Norway.

"Don't Feel Like Crying" was released on 17 January 2019 to be the fourth single from the album. "There's a certain grace to heartache," said Sigrid. "A sort of... epic grace! I like good, heartfelt pop songs." Commercially, it reached the top thirty in Norway and the top 20 in the UK, Scotland and Ireland. "Sight of You" was released on 28 February 2019 as the album's fifth single, one week before the album's release.

On 3 May 2019, "Mine Right Now" was released as the sixth single from the album. In June, the music video for the song was released; due to flight issues, Sigrid hadn't been able to appear in the music video, so the director, Max Siedentopf, had starred in the video instead. A vertical video focusing on the singer was released on 25 July 2019, and the fan art video on 21 August 2019.

=== Promotional singles ===
"Dynamite" was released as the album's first promotional single on 28 April 2017. It was included on Sigrid's debut EP Don't Kill My Vibe (2017).

== Critical reception ==
Professional ratings
Aggregate scores
Source	Rating
AnyDecentMusic?	7.5/10
Metacritic	78/100
Review scores
Source	Rating
AllMusic	4/5 stars
Clash	8/10
DIY	3.5/5 stars
Drowned in Sound	8/10
Exclaim!	7/10
The Irish Times	4/5 stars
The Line of Best Fit	10/10
NME	4/5 stars
Pitchfork	6.0/10
Rolling Stone	3.5/5 stars

Sucker Punch received generally positive reviews from music critics. At Metacritic, which assigns a normalised rating out of 100 to reviews from mainstream critics, the album received an average score of 78, based on 16 reviews, which indicates "generally favorable reviews". Robin Murray, writing for Clash, rated the album eight stars out of ten, calling the album a "compact, concise display of pop ambition, a finely balanced feat that puts the Norwegian talent’s innate abilities against her desire to stretch, to uncover something new". Kitty Richardson of The Line of Best Fit, rated the album ten out of ten and wrote that the album "radiate[s] her particular brand of empowerment: not the sweeping, air-punching kind we might expect from her counterparts, but a more modest commitment to self-love – especially when life throws its inevitable right hooks". Rating the album four stars out five, Neil Yeung of AllMusic called Sucker Punch "a masterful debut from a promising talent unafraid to just be herself".

Thomas Smith, writing for NME, rated the album four stars out of five and stated the record "doesn’t feel like a meticulously choreographed and cunning plot to make Sigrid a International Pop Superstar". He concluded his review by calling the album "a marvellous cap on a two-year campaign that did just about everything right". Harriet Linnell, writing for Drowned in Sound, rated the album eight stars out of ten, praising Sigrid for "[carving] out her own sonic niche". She additionally called Sucker Punch an "eclectic, original yet incredibly memorable first record". Rachel Finn, writing for DIY, described the album as "full of swooping, dramatic choruses and clean-cut vocals, where almost every song is a potential radio hit—only that's not a bad thing". She then rated the album 3.5 stars out of 5. Brad Garcia of Exclaim! rated the record 7 out of 10, stating "though it may seem as though she's yet to fully embrace her uniqueness in mainstream spaces, there are plenty of moments on Sucker Punch that suggest Sigrid is on her way".

Sucker Punch year-end lists
Publication	Accolade	Rank	Ref.
AllMusic	Favorite Pop Albums	N/A	
Chorus.fm	Top 25 Albums of 2019	14	
Gaffa (Denmark)	The 20 Best Foreign Albums of the Year	19	
Uproxx	The 35 Best Pop Albums of 2019	22	

== Track listing ==
Credits were adapted from iTunes and Sigrid's Twitter.

Sucker Punch track listing
No.	Title	Writer(s)	Producer	Length
1.	"Sucker Punch"	Sigrid Raabe; Emily Schwartz; Martin Sjølie	Sjølie; Odd Martin Skålnes	3:14
2.	"Mine Right Now"	Raabe; Schwartz; Sjølie	Sjølie; Skålnes	3:23
3.	"Basic"	Raabe; Jonny Lattimer	Sjølie; Skålnes	3:37
4.	"Strangers"	Raabe; Sjølie	Sjølie	3:53
5.	"Don't Feel Like Crying"	Raabe; Schwartz; Oscar Holter	Holter	2:37
6.	"Level Up"	Raabe; Schwartz; Sjølie	Sjølie; Skålnes	2:17
7.	"Sight of You"	Raabe; Askjell Solstrand	Solstrand	3:57
8.	"In Vain"	Raabe; Joseph Janiak	Solstrand	4:07
9.	"Don't Kill My Vibe"	Raabe; Sjølie	Sjølie	3:04
10.	"Business Dinners"	Raabe; Jonnali Parmenius; Patrik Berger; Martin Stilling	Berger; Stilling	2:48
11.	"Never Mine"	Raabe; Parmenius; Sjølie	Sjølie	3:38
12.	"Dynamite"	Raabe; Solstrand	Solstrand	3:51
Total length:				40:23

== Charts ==
=== Weekly charts ===
Sucker Punch weekly chart performance
Chart (2019)	Peak position
Australian Albums (ARIA)	84
Austrian Albums (Ö3 Austria)	51
Belgian Albums (Ultratop Flanders)	34
Belgian Albums (Ultratop Wallonia)	151
Dutch Albums (Album Top 100)	33
France Downloads Albums (SNEP)	30
German Albums (Offizielle Top 100)	63
Irish Albums (IRMA)	4
Norwegian Albums (VG-lista)	1
Scottish Albums (OCC)	4
Swedish Albums (Sverigetopplistan)	57
Swiss Albums (Schweizer Hitparade)	54
UK Albums (OCC)	4
US Heatseekers Albums (Billboard)	3
US Top Album Sales (Billboard)	90

=== Year-end charts ===
Sucker Punch year-end chart performance
Chart (2019)	Position
UK Albums (OCC)	91

== Certifications ==
Sucker Punch certifications
Region	Certification	Certified units/sales
Norway (IFPI Norway)	2× Platinum	40,000^{‡}
United Kingdom (BPI)	Gold	100,000^{‡}
^{‡} Sales+streaming figures based on certification alone.
