= Lxandra =

Finnish pop singer

Alexandra Lehti (born 22 March 1996), better known by her stage name Lxandra, is a Finnish pop singer and songwriter. Raised in Suomenlinna, she is a daughter of journalist Baba Lybeck and musician Pekka Lehti, and presently resides in Berlin. Lxandra is a Swedish-speaking Finn.

She participated in Uuden Musiikin Kilpailu 2023 with the song "Something to Lose". In the final, she finished in sixth place with 70 points (24 points from the televote and 46 points from the juries).

== Albums ==
- Another Lesson Learned (2019)
- Careful What I Dream Of (2021)
