= Askjell =

- Born: Askjell Jon Reigem Solstrand; Askøy Municipality, Norway
- Citizenship: Norway
- Occupations: Record producer; songwriter; musician; programmer
- Years active: 2014-present
- Musical career
- Genres: Ambient; electronic; pop; electropop
- Instruments: Piano; keyboard; organ; bass
- Labels: MADE; Island; UMG
- Website: twitter.com/AskjellS

Askjell Solstrand, also known mononymously as Askjell, is a Norwegian record producer and songwriter, currently based in Bergen, Norway. He has grown as an affiliate with acts, including Sigrid, Aurora and Iris Caltwait. He has also released two extended plays, entitled Requiem and To Be Loved, as a solo artist in 2019. His debut album, everything will be ok, was released in 2022.

== Discography ==
=== Studio albums ===
Title	Details
everything will be ok	Released: 24 June 2022; Label: Mercury KX, Decca, Island, MADE; Formats: LP, CD, digital download, streaming

=== Extended plays ===
Title	Details
To Be Loved	Released: 24 September 2019; Label: MADE; Formats: Digital download, streaming

=== Singles ===
Title	Year	Album
"Autumn, Autumn"	2019	To Be Loved EP
"Requiem"	2019	To Be Loved EP
"To Be Loved" (solo or featuring Aurora)	2019	To Be Loved EP
"Sofia" (featuring Iris and Aurora)	2021	everything will be ok
"L O S T M Y C O O L"	2021	everything will be ok
"dear past i've seen the apocalypse and i wanna go home" (featuring Emilie Nicolas)	2021	everything will be ok
"atomic bombs atomic bonds i love you"	2022	everything will be ok

=== Songwriting and production credits ===
Title	Year	Artist	Album	Songwriter	Producer		
Title	Year	Artist	Album	Songwriter	Primary	Secondary	Additional
"Can't Have This"	2016	HowLow	Non-album single		check		
"Fiffen I Ferrari"	2016	Virvelvind	Non-album single	check	check		
"Fredag"	2016	Kjartan Lauritzen	Non-album single	check	check		
"Hide and Seek"	2016	dePresno	Forever EP	check	check		
"Stranger in Disguise"	2016	dePresno	Forever EP	check	check		
"Souvenir"	2016	dePresno	Forever EP	check	check		
"Forever"	2016	dePresno	Forever EP	check	check		
"Nyte D"	2017	Kjartan Lauritzen	Fenomenet EP	check	check		
"Dynamite"	2017	Sigrid	Don't Kill My Vibe EP	check	check		
"Byen min Brenner"	2017	Virvelvind	Non-album single	check	check		
"Gravity"	2018	Marius Samuelsen	Non-album single	check	check		
"Out of Order"	2018	Marius Samuelsen	Non-album single	check	check		
"First Impression"	2018	Amanda Tenfjord	First Impression EP	check	check		
"DoWhatItDo"	2018	Pasha	Park	check	check		
"Skyller Ned"	2018	Sushi x Kobe	Døden Lever Lengst	check	check		
"Forgotten Love"	2018	Aurora	Infections of a Different Kind (Step 1)		check		
"Overtenning"	2018	Sushi x Kobe	Døden Lever Lengst	check	check		
"So Precious"	2018	Askling	Non-album single	check	check		
"Gentle Earthquakes"	2018	Aurora	Infections of a Different Kind (Step 1)		check		
"All is Soft Inside"	2018	Aurora	Infections of a Different Kind (Step 1)				check
"It Happened Quiet"	2018	Aurora	Infections of a Different Kind (Step 1)		check		
"Infections of a Different Kind"	2018	Aurora	Infections of a Different Kind (Step 1)		check		
"Doden Lever Lengst"	2018	Sushi x Kobe	Døden Lever Lengst	check	check		
"C'est la mort"	2018	Sushi x Kobe	Døden Lever Lengst	check	check		
"Jeg har levd, jeg er fornoyd"	2018	Sushi x Kobe	Døden Lever Lengst	check	check		
"Rust"	2018	Sushi x Kobe	Døden Lever Lengst	check	check		
"Soldiers"	2018	Amanda Delara	Non-album single	check	check		
"Paper Thin"	2018	dePresno	Technicolor EP	check	check		
"Pick a Card"	2018	Amanda Tenfjord	First Impression EP	check	check		
"On My Mind"	2018	Kate Stewart	In the Beginning EP	check	check		
"La meg være i fred"	2019	Kjartan Lauritzen	Game Boy	check	check		
"From Inside a Car"	2019	Iris	A Sensitive Being EP	check	check		
"Red Eyes"	2019	Jesper Jenset	Waves, Vol. 2	check			check
"Animal"	2019	Aurora	A Different Kind of Human (Step 2)		check		
"Give Me Your Number"	2019	dePresno	Last of the Romantics EP		check		
"Hanging Around You/Crackers"	2019	Iris	A Sensitive Being EP		check		
"Sight of You"	2019	Sigrid	Sucker Punch	check	check		
"In Vain"	2019	Sigrid	Sucker Punch		check		
"Dynamite"	2019	Sigrid	Sucker Punch	check	check		
"Game Boy"	2019	Kjartan Lauritzen	Game Boy	check	check		
"The Seed"	2019	Aurora	A Different Kind of Human (Step 2)			check	
"Wanderers"	2019	dePresno	Technicolor EP	check			
"Intro"	2019	Iris	A Sensitive Being EP	check	check		
"Liquid Love"	2019	dePresno	Technicolor EP	check	check		
"WOMTU"	2019	dePresno	Technicolor EP	check	check		
"Rather Be"	2019	dePresno	Technicolor EP	check	check		
"Recipe for Disaster"	2019	dePresno	Technicolor EP	check	check		
"Fakta"	2019	Kjartan Lauritzen	Game Boy	check	check		
"Alt Eg Vil"	2019	Kjartan Lauritzen	Game Boy	check	check		
"Dance on the Moon"	2019	Aurora	A Different Kind of Human (Step 2)			check	
"Daydreamer"	2019	Aurora	A Different Kind of Human (Step 2)			check	
"In Bottles"	2019	Aurora	A Different Kind of Human (Step 2)			check	
"A Different Kind of Human"	2019	Aurora	A Different Kind of Human (Step 2)	check	check		
"Mothership"	2019	Aurora	A Different Kind of Human (Step 2)	check	check		
"Taped"	2019	Naaz	The Beautiful Struggle EP	check	check		
"Wide Awake" (featuring Iris)	2019	dePresno	Monochrome	check	check		
"Kroppsprak"	2019	Iris	Non-album single		check		
"Damage :("	2019	Naaz	The Beautiful Struggle EP	check	check		
"Kintsugi"	2019	Gabrielle Aplin	Dear Happy	check	check		
"It's Not You It's Me"	2019	Naaz	The Beautiful Struggle EP	check	check		
"밤소풍"	2025	Illit	Bomb	check	check		

=== Remixes ===
- Sigrid - "High Five" (2018)
- Aurora - "The River" (2019)
