= Sigrid (singer) =

Norwegian singer (born 1996)

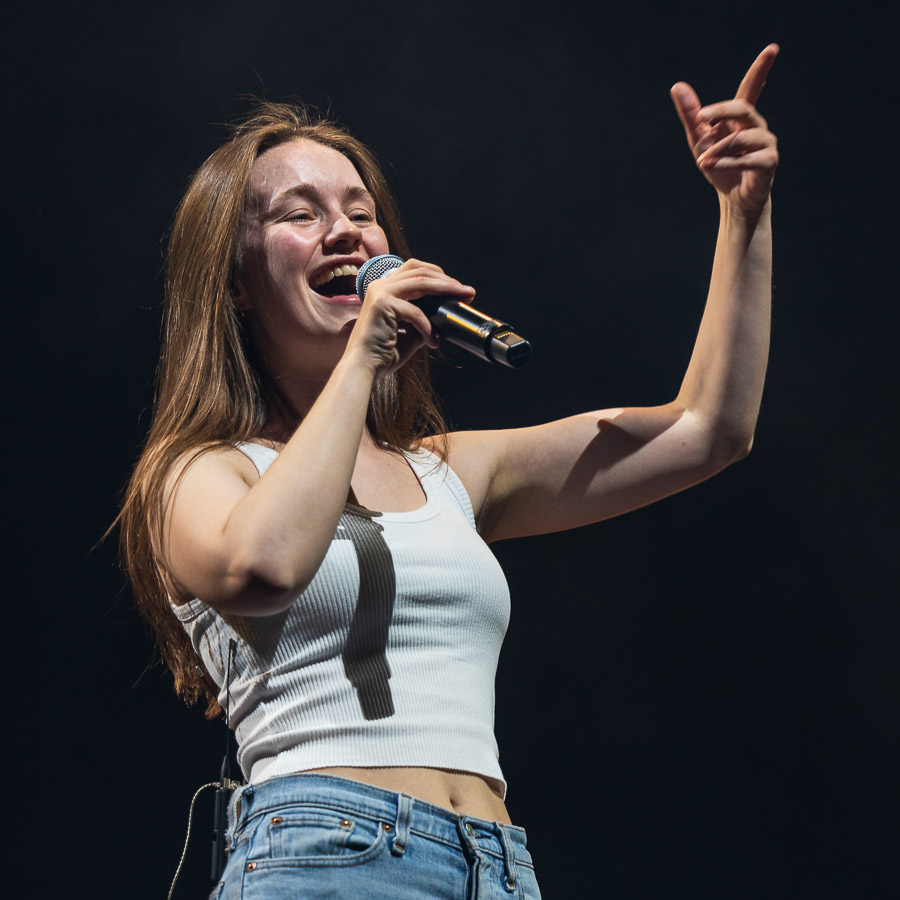
- Sigrid in 2022

Background information
- Born: Sigrid Solbakk Raabe; 5 September 1996 (age 30); Ålesund, Møre og Romsdal, Norway
- Origin: Bergen, Vestland, Norway
- Genres: Pop; electropop; synth-pop; scandipop
- Occupations: Singer; songwriter
- Instruments: Vocals; guitar; piano
- Works: Discography; songs
- Years active: 2013–present
- Labels: Island; Petroleum; EMI
- Website: www.thisissigrid.com

Sigrid Solbakk Raabe (born 5 September 1996), known mononymously as Sigrid, is a Norwegian singer and songwriter. She has released three studio albums, Sucker Punch (2019), How to Let Go (2022), and There's Always More That I Could Say (2025). Both her debut and second album reached the top of the charts in Norway as well as reaching the top 5 in the United Kingdom. She has also released three EPs.

== Early life ==
Sigrid Solbakk Raabe was born in Ålesund to Håkon Raabe and Anette Sølberg Solbakk on 5 September 1996. She has two older siblings, a brother, Tellef, who is also a musician, and a sister, Johanne. At her first performance, in kindergarten, she had to be pulled off the stage after crying. She began playing the piano at age 7 and began singing at age 13. When she was 13, she performed a version of Nirvana's 'Smells Like Teen Spirit'. In her early youth, she planned to become a teacher or lawyer or journalist, thinking a career in music would be too uncertain.

In her first year of high school, she realized that music was more than just a hobby. When she was 17, she and her sister Johanne started a band called Sala Says Mhyp, which was named after their late cat, Sala. After finishing high school in Ålesund, Sigrid moved to Bergen for its indie music scene, living in a shared flat with her brother and friends. She began studying comparative politics at university, but soon dropped out to pursue her music career.

== Career ==
=== 2012–2015: Career Beginnings ===
At the age of 16 she wrote her first song, 'Sun', after her brother, Tellef Raabe, who is also a musician, told her to stop performing cover versions of Adele songs at performances and challenged her to write a song that she could perform at one of his gigs. In 2013, she released 'Sun' as her debut single. The song received airplay on Norwegian radio stations. She signed to Petroleum Records the following year and performed at festivals such as Øyafestivalen. After the success of 'Sun', Sigrid went on to release two other singles, 'Two Fish' in 2013 and 'Known You Forever' in 2014. These three singles are currently unavailable for purchase on digital storefronts, but can be found on YouTube along with many other unreleased works by Sigrid.

=== 2017–2020: Don't Kill My Vibe, Raw, and Sucker Punch ===
In 2016, in partnership with Martin Sjølie, she wrote "Don't Kill My Vibe", inspired by an incident where a producer belittled and patronized her in a songwriting session. After executives at Island Records heard the song, they immediately signed her to a recording contract. On 5 May 2017 she released her debut EP which was named after the song. The EP charted in Norway, Australia, and the United Kingdom. In the spring and summer of 2017, Sigrid performed at The Great Escape Festival, Roskilde Festival, Glastonbury Festival, Latitude Festival, and the Reading and Leeds Festivals. She was also a part of The Sims 4: Parenthood soundtrack with the Simlish version of her song, "Don't Kill My Vibe". In November 2017, Sigrid released her single “Strangers”. She is also featured on the 2017 Justice League soundtrack, performing a cover of Leonard Cohen's 1988 classic "Everybody Knows".

In January 2018, Sigrid was announced as the winner of BBC Music Sound of 2018. On 10 February 2018, she was a guest presenter for an episode of The Playlist for CBBC. In the same month, Sigrid won the Newcomer of the Year award at the 2018 Spellemannprisen. On 11 July 2018, Raw, her second EP, which featured five tracks, was released.

On 8 March 2019, Sigrid's debut album, Sucker Punch, was released. The album consists of 12 tracks, including five songs released prior to the album. In 2019, Sigrid toured with Maroon 5 for the Red Pill Blues Tour in Europe, was the support act for George Ezra's tour across the United Kingdom, and headlined a tour in North America and Europe. Sigrid contributed a song, "Home to You" for The Aeronauts soundtrack. She was listed in Forbes "30 under 30" for European Entertainment in 2019.

In 2020, Sigrid was one of many artists that took part in a BBC Radio 1 Live Lounge cover of the Foo Fighters song "Times Like These" that was organised to raise funds for the COVID-19 pandemic. In May, she was named Spellemann of the Year and won the Pop Artist award at the annual Spellemannprisen. In November 2021, Sigrid performed in Dingle, Ireland as part of the twentieth series of the live music series Other Voices.

=== 2021–present: How to Let Go, The Hype, and There's Always More That I Could Say ===
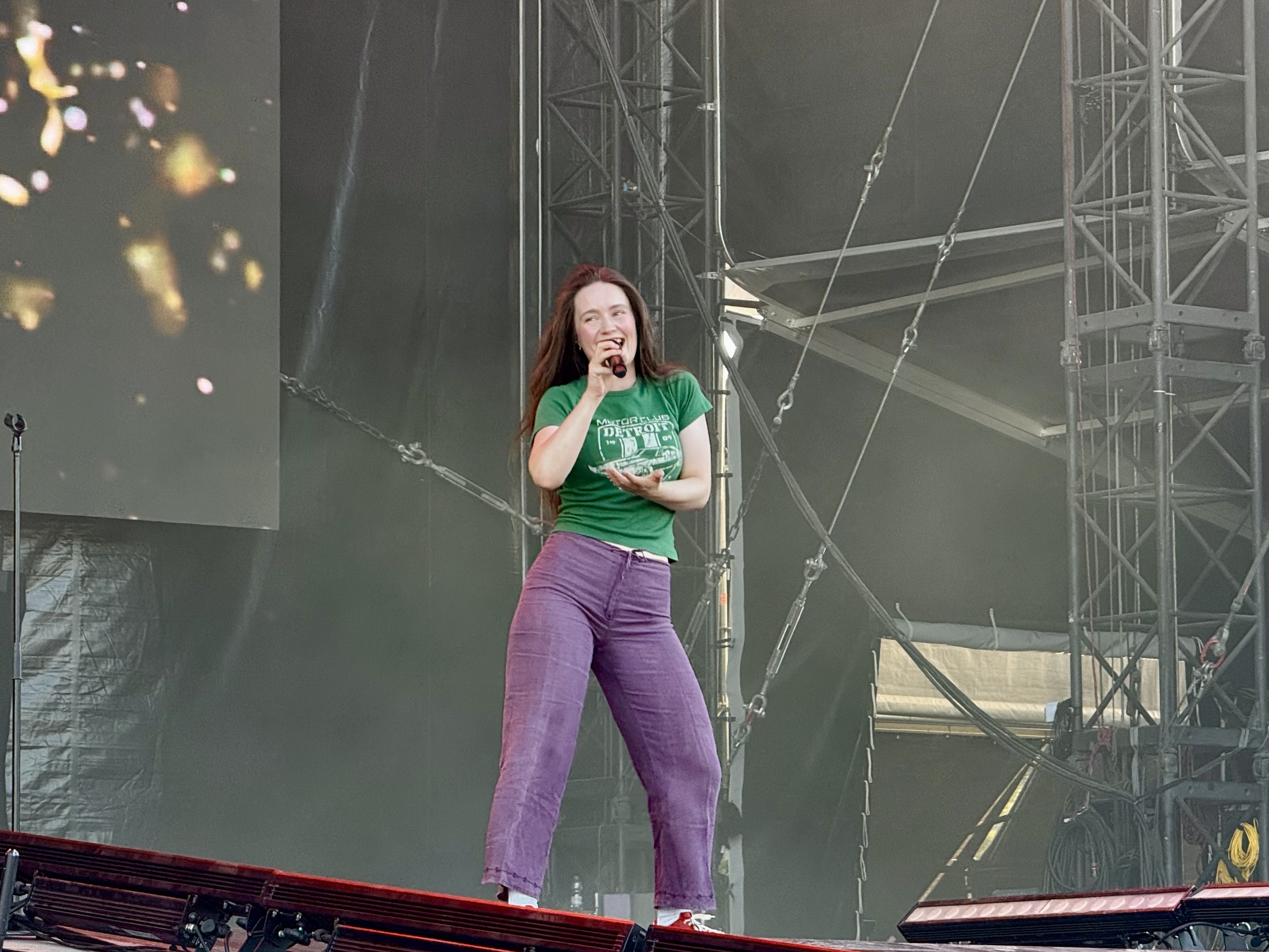
Sigrid at the 2026 Sziget Festival in Budapest, Hungary

Sigrid's second album, the 12-track How To Let Go, was released in May 2022. The album was accompanied by a 50-date world tour, that began in May 2022 with the Radio 1 Big Weekend and ended on 24 November at the 3Arena in Dublin, Ireland. In November 2022, Sigrid released a deluxe edition of How To Let Go, which featured acoustic renditions of many tracks from the album and also added a couple of new, previously unheard songs to the album, such as “Blue” and “Everybody Says They’re Fine”.

In September 2023, Sigrid released her third EP, The Hype, which consisted of four songs. In June 2024, she released “The Feeling”, a song collaboration with fellow musical artist Kygo.

In July 2025, Sigrid released single Jellyfish, later announced as the first single from her then upcoming album. Sigrid's third album, There's Always More That I Could Say, was released in October 2025. The album consisted of 10 tracks, including three singles that were released prior to the album. The album was accompanied by an 18-date UK and European Tour, beginning in January 2026 at Rockefeller in Oslo, Norway and ended on 24 March 2026 at the Barrowland Ballroom in Glasgow, Scotland.

== Artistry ==
Sigrid's songs are underpinned by anger, melancholia, and disappointment; she says that it is easier to write about frustration than about having a nice time. For her love songs Sigrid cites Bonnie Raitt, Coldplay, Adele, Lykke Li, and Robyn as influences.

== Personal life ==
Sigrid is a brand ambassador for Gore-Tex. Until 2022, she was in a relationship with Norwegian skier and filmmaker Nikolai Schirmer.

== Discography ==
Studio albums

- Sucker Punch (2019)
- How to Let Go (2022)
- There's Always More That I Could Say (2025)

EPs

- Don't Kill My Vibe (2017)
- Raw (2018)
- The Hype (2023)

== Tours ==
Headlining

- UK & Ireland Tour (2018)
- European Tour (November 2018)
- The Sucker Punch Tour (US 2019)
- UK & EU Tour (2019)
- How to Let Go Tour (2022–2023)
- Norway Club Tour (2023)
- Latin America Tour (2024)
- There's Always More That I Could Say Tour (2026)

Supporting

- Oh Wonder – European Ultralife Tour (2017)
- Maroon 5 – Red Pill Blues Tour (2019)
- George Ezra – UK Arena Tour (2019)
- Ed Sheeran – Loop Tour (2026)

== Awards and nominations ==
Sigrid is the recipient of numerous awards including three Spellemann Awards, two MTV Europe Music Awards, and two P3 Gull. She received the Spellemann of the Year award at the 2019 Spellemannprisen.

Award	Year	Recipient(s)	Category	Result	Ref.
BBC Sound of...	2018	Sigrid	Sound of 2018	Won	
BreakTudo Awards	2018	Sigrid	International New Artist	Nominated	
European Border Breakers Awards	2018	Don't Kill My Vibe	Emerging Artists – Norway	Won	
GAFFA Awards (Denmark)	2019	Sigrid	Best Foreign New Act	Nominated	
GAFFA Awards (Norway)	2017	Sigrid	Best Nordic Solo Act	Won	
GAFFA Awards (Norway)	2017	"Don't Kill My Vibe"	Best Nordic Hit	Won	
GAFFA Awards (Norway)	2018	"High Five"	Best Nordic Hit	Nominated	
GAFFA Awards (Norway)	2018	Sigrid	Best Nordic Solo Act	Nominated	
GAFFA Awards (Sweden)	2018	Best Foreign New Act	Sigrid	Nominated	
GAFFA Awards (Sweden)	2019	Best Foreign Solo Act	Sigrid	Nominated	
Houston Film Critics Society	2020	"Home to You"	Best Original Song	Nominated	
MTV Brand New	2018	Sigrid	Brand New for 2018	Nominated	
MTV Europe Music Awards	2018	Sigrid	Best Push Act	Nominated	
MTV Europe Music Awards	2018	Sigrid	Best Norwegian Act	Nominated	
MTV Europe Music Awards	2019	Sigrid	Best Norwegian Act	Won	
MTV Europe Music Awards	2021	Sigrid	Best Nordic Act	Nominated	
MTV Europe Music Awards	2022	Sigrid	Best Nordic Act	Won	
MTV Video Music Awards	2018	Sigrid	Push Artist of the Year	Nominated	
Music Week Awards	2019	Sigrid	Music & Brand Partnership	Nominated	
NME Awards	2018	Sigrid	Best New Artist	Nominated	
NME Awards	2022	"Head on Fire" (with Griff)	Best Collaboration	Won	
P3 Gull	2017	Sigrid	Best Newcomer	Won	
P3 Gull	2017	Sigrid	Best Live Artist	Nominated	
P3 Gull	2017	"Don't Kill My Vibe"	Song of the Year	Nominated	
P3 Gull	2018	Sigrid	Best Live Artist	Nominated	
P3 Gull	2018	"Strangers"	Song of the Year	Won	
P3 Gull	2019	"Don't Feel Like Crying"	Song of the Year	Nominated	
P3 Gull	2021	"Mirror"	Song of the Year	Nominated	
P3 Gull	2025	Sigrid	P3 Prize	Honoree	
Spellemannprisen	2018	Sigrid	Newcomer of the Year & Gramo Scholarship	Won	
Spellemannprisen	2018	Don't Kill My Vibe	Pop Artist	Nominated	
Spellemannprisen	2018	"Don't Kill My Vibe"	Song of the Year	Nominated	
Spellemannprisen	2019	Sigrid	International Success of the Year	Nominated	
Spellemannprisen	2019	Raw	Pop Artist	Nominated	
Spellemannprisen	2019	"Strangers"	Song of the Year	Nominated	
Spellemannprisen	2019	"Sucker Punch"	Music Video of the Year	Nominated	
Spellemannprisen	2020	Sigrid	Spellemann of the Year (Note: No nominees were announced for this award.)	Won	
Spellemannprisen	2020	Sucker Punch	Album of the Year (Note: This category is presented as Release of the Year since the 2022 Spellemannprisen.)	Nominated	
Spellemannprisen	2020	Sucker Punch	Songwriter of the Year	Nominated	
Spellemannprisen	2020	Sucker Punch	Pop Artist	Won	
Spellemannprisen	2020	"Don't Feel Like Crying"	Song of the Year	Nominated	
Spellemannprisen	2023	Sigrid	International Success of the Year	Nominated	
UK Music Video Awards	2018	Sigrid	Best Artist	Nominated	
UK Music Video Awards	2018	"Focus"	Best Animation in a Video	Nominated	
UK Music Video Awards	2019	"Sucker Punch"	Best Pop Video - International	Nominated	
UK Music Video Awards	2025	"Jellyfish"	Best Colour Grading in a Video – Newcomer	Nominated	
