= Børge Petersen-Øverleir =

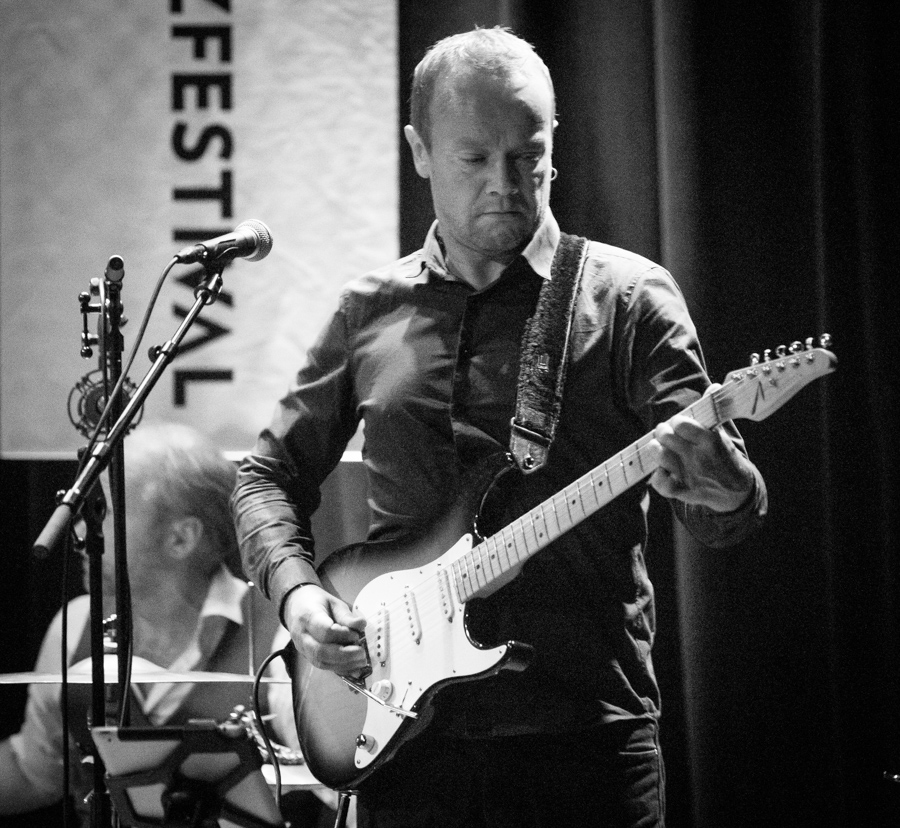
- Børge Petersen-Øverleir performing in 2017

Background information
- Born: 3 February 1967 (age 59); Hemnesberget, Nordland
- Origin: Norway
- Genres: Jazz, rock, pop music
- Occupation: Musician
- Instrument: Guitar
- Website: eivindaarset.com

Børge Petersen-Øverleir (born 3 February 1967 in Hemnesberget, Norway) is a Norwegian guitarist, raised in Bergen and Bodø, early active in heavy rock, autodidact in jazz centered around in Bodø.

== Biography ==
Petersen-Øverleir has collaborated on several recordings, including with Jan Gunnar Hoff, Henning Gravrok and Tore Johansen, as well as in trio with Tore Johansen and Arild Andersen.

Other cooperation has been on records and tours with Anita Skorgan, Kari Bremnes, Bjørn Eidsvåg, Halvdan Sivertsen, Søyr, Karoline Krüger, Ketil Bjørnstad, Kine Hellebust, Maria Solheim and Jørn Hoel, among others.

He has also been record producer for Eva Trones' releases of Terje Nilsens releases of children songs.

== Discography ==
=== Solo album ===
- 2007: Songs From My Room (Songsfrommyroomrecords)

=== Collaborations ===
With 'Glass'

- 1986: Eyes Will Talk (Hot Records)
- 1994: Ædda Bædda (Majorstudio)

With Halvdan Sivertsen

- 1987: Ny Og Naken (Plateselskapet)
- 1989: Førr Ei Dame (Plateselskapet)
- 1991: Hilsen Halvdan (Plateselskapet)
- 1994: Kjærlighetslandet ()
- 1996: Helt Halvdan (Nordaførr)
- 2001: Tvil, Håp Og Kjærlighet ()
- 2003: Frelsesarmeens Juleplate ()

With Terje Nilsen

- 1987: Sørpolnissen ... Broren Til Julenissen (Grappa Music)
- 1992: Kanskje (Darius)
- 1996: Sånn (Nord-Norsk Plateselskap)
- 2010: Møte (), with Bodø Sinfonietta

With Henning Gravrok

- 1990: Minner Om I Morgen (Hot Club Records)
- 1996: Hyss (Euridice)
- 1998: Ord – Med Tekster Av Rolf Jacobsen (Tylden & Co)
- 2006: Sense (Turn Left)
- 2009: Q (Turn Left)

With 'Lille Marius'

- 1991: Bak Stengte Dører Single (Solution Records)
- 1992: Bak Stengte Dører (Crema Records)

With Bjørn Eidsvåg

- 1993: Allemannsland (Norsk Plateproduksjon )
- 1999: Tapt Uskyld (Metropol Music)
- 2000: Hittil Og Littil (Petroleum Records)
- 2001: A Poem For Peace ()
- 2002: Tålt (Petroleum Records)
- 2004: En Vakker Dag ()
- 2006: Nåde ()
- 2008: Pust ()
- 2009: De Beste ()

With Kari Bremnes

- 1994: Gåte Ved Gåte (Kirkelig Kulturverksted)
- 1997: Månestein (Kirkelig Kulturverksted)
- 1998: Svarta Bjørn (Kirkelig Kulturverksted)
- 2000: Norwegian Mood (Kirkelig Kulturverksted)
- 2002: 11 Ubesvarte Anrop (Kirkelig Kulturverksted)
- 2003: You'd Have To Be Here (Kirkelig Kulturverksted)
- 2006: Over En By (Kirkelig Kulturverksted)

With Oofotr

- 1995: Oofotr (Norske Gram)

With D'Sound

- 1996: Spice Of Life (PolyGram, Urban)
- 1998: Beauty Is a Blessing (PolyGram)
- 2004: Smooth Escapes – The Very Best of D'Sound (Da Works)

With Torbjørn Sunde

- 1998: Meridians (ACT Music)

With Jan Gunnar Hoff

- 1998: Crosslands (Curling Legs)
- 2003: In Town (Curling Legs)
- 2007: Meditatus (), with Bodø Domkor
- 2012: Quiet Winter Night (2L), with Hoff Ensemble

With Amy Studt

- 2003: Under The Thumb (19 Recordings, Polydor)
- 2003: False Smiles (19 Recordings, Polydor)
- 2003: Misfit (Polydor)

With 'Northern Arc'

- 2012: Northern Arc (Curling Legs)

With other projects

- 1989: Tang Mellom Tærn, Himmel I Håret (Nordland Teater), with Nordland Teater
- 1991: Op, Op I Skal Utsjunge (), with Bodø Domkor conducted by Bjørn Andor Drage
- 1992: Ta Meg Til Havet (), with Hanne Krogh
- 1992: Markedet (), with Dag Kajander
- 1993: Sol & regn (Plateselskapet Sol), with Arild Nyquist and Svein Olav Blindheim
- 1994: Varm I Hodet (Kirkelig Kulturverksted), with Anders Wyller
- 1994: Distant Shore (Origo Sound), with Sverre Knut Johansen
- 1994: Get Up! (BMG Ariola), with Oslo Gospel Choir
- 1994: Julenatt (WEA), with Anita Skorgan
- 1995: Det syng (), with Lynni Treekrem
- 1995: Salmer (), with Kristin Reitan
- 1995: Tiden Kler Seg Naken (Kirkelig Kulturverksted), with 'Dronning Mauds Land'
- 1995: The Best of Fra Lippo Lippi 85–95 (CNR Music), with Fra Lippo Lippi
- 1995: Haugtussa (Kirkelig Kulturverksted), with Lynni Treekrem, music by Ketil Bjørnstad, lyrics by Arne Garborg
- 1995: Stille Natt Hellige Natt (Master Music), with Cato Kristiansen
- 1995: Vær Hilset! (Grappa Music), with Ola Bremnes and Bodø Domkor
- 1996: Det Går Likar No (Norske Gram), with D.D.E.
- 1996: Songs From The Pocket (Norsk Plateproduksjon), with Jørun Bøgeberg
- 1996: Homeland (1996), with Line Thorstensen
- 1996: Peak Man (), with 'A Few Good Men'
- 1996: Lys (), with Jahn Teigen
- 1997: Spindelsinn (Columbia), with Kari Rueslåtten
- 1997: Smelter På Tungen (Norsk Plateproduksjon), with 'Dronning Mauds Land'
- 1997: Så Skimrande Var Aldrig Havet (1997), with Elisabeth Andreassen
- 1997: Tusen Små Rom (CNR Music), with Thore Pettersen
- 1999: Arkana (Grappa Music), with Kjetil Saunes
- 1999: Deilig (Grappa Music), with Jan Eggum
- 1999: The Source Of Energy (Origo Sound), with Sverre Knut Johansen
- 2000: 7 (Polydor), with S Club 7
- 2000: Airborne (Columbia), with Torhild Sivertsen
- 2000: Lucy Street (), with Lucy Street
- 2000: Kildespring : Nordnorske Folketoner (), with Bodø Domkor
- 2000: Julesalmer (), with Kristin Reitan
- 2001: Sunshine (Polydor), with S Club 7
- 2001: After The Rain (Virgin), with Bellefire
- 2001: Gull (2001), with Anita Skorgan
- 2001: 2 Minutes Too Late (), with Lucy Street
- 2001: Lysbroen (White Mountain Records), with Torgils Gundersen
- 2001: Barefoot (Kirkelig Kulturverksted), with Maria Solheim
- 2001: 10 Sanger (), with Lars Martin Myhre
- 2002: Lovin' is Easy (Polydor), with Hear'Say
- 2002: Another Phase (Columbia), with Maria Mena
- 2002: Vanvittige Tider (), with Blått og Rått
- 2002: You Know Me (), with Paris
- 2002: Barcelona (Bonnier Amigo Music Norway), with Paperboys & Madcon
- 2002: Border Girl (Universal Records), with Paulina Rubio
- 2003: Sweet Dreams My L.A. Ex (Polydor), with Rachel Stevens
- 2003: Maria Arredondo (Universal), with Maria Arredondo
- 2003: Say It Isn't So (), with Gareth Gates
- 2003: Give Me A Reason (Polydor), with Triple Eight
- 2003: Mysteriet (Mysterri) Single (Epic), with Aki Sirkesalo & Lisa Nilsson
- 2003: Funky Dory (Polydor), with Rachel Stevens
- 2003: Brim Og Båra – Bodø Domkor Syng Blix (), with Bodø Domkor
- 2003: SoulO (Universal Records), with Nick Lachey
- 2003: Measure Of A Man (RCA), with Clay Aiken
- 2003: Go Your Own Way (BMG UK & Ireland), with Gareth Gates
- 2003: Samlade Sånger 1992–2003 (Diesel Music, Sony Music), with Lisa Nilsson
- 2003: Lille Bille – Eva Trones Synger Barnesanger Av Terje Nilsen (Euridice), with Eva Trones
- 2004: Wiggle It ( Bonnier Amigo Music Norway ), with Paperboys
- 2004: Lånte Fjær (White Mountain Records), with Torgils Gundersen
- 2004: Killing Floor (), with Wiggo Johnsen
- 2004: Felino (), with Electrocutango
- 2004: Need To Know (), with Anne Hvidsten
- 2004: The Meaning of Love (), with Michelle McManus
- 2004: Not Going Under (Universal), with Maria Arredondo
- 2004: White Turns Blue (Columbia), with Maria Mena
- 2004: Neste Sommer (Bonnier Amigo Music Group), with Pita featuring Mary L
- 2004: The Sun Has Come Your Way (), with Sam & Mark
- 2004: Over (Casablanca), with Lindsay Lohan
- 2004: Songs From A Gameboy – Generation Toughguy (), with Wiggo Johnsen
- 2004: Speak (Casablanca), with Lindsay Lohan
- 2004: A Part of Me (), with Kurt Nilsen
- 2005: Last Minute (), with Kristin Frogner
- 2005: Apparently Unaffected (), with Maria Mena
- 2005: When Worlds Collide (), with Paperboys
- 2006: Sånn Bærre E Det (), with Raymond Hansen
- 2006: Til Meg (), with Unni Wilhelmsen
- 2006: Receita Para A Vida (), with Claudio Latini
- 2007: Tomorrow Only Knows (), with Alejandro Fuentes
- 2007: For a Moment (), with Maria Arredondo
- 2008: Stayer (Kirkelig Kulturverksted), with Lars Bremnes
- 2008: Høyoktan (), with 'Blått og Rått'
- 2008: Cause and Effect (), with Maria Mena
- 2008: Hold On Be Strong (), with Maria Haukaas Storeng
- 2008: Sichelle (), with Sichelle
- 2008: Paradiso (), with Moment
- 2008: En Kærlighedsaffære (), with Karen Busck
- 2008: Chasing Lights (), with The Saturdays
- 2008: Episoder (), with Kaia Huuse
- 2008: Tiden Går Altfor Fort (), with Kjell Widlund
- 2008: Sammen Er Vi Blå (), with Sarpsborg Sparta Fotballklubb
- 2008: Måne Blek (), with Kjetil Saunes
- 2009: Våge (), with Per Øystein Sørensen
- 2009: U And I, Ted (), with 'U And I, Ted'
- 2009: Æ Ror Aleina (), with Tonje Unstad
- 2009: This Gig Almost Got Me Killed (), with Ovi
- 2009: Christmas in Bethlehem (), with Carola
- 2010: Trond Trudvang (), with Trond Trudvang
- 2010: Søt musikk (2010), with Inge Ulrik Gundersen
- 2010: A Thousand Different Ways/Measure Of A Man (), with Clay Aiken
- 2010: Cocool (), with Tone Damli
- 2010: A Million Miles Away (album)|A Million Miles Away (), with Marian Aas Hansen
- 2010: Waiting for Daylight (), with a1
- 2010: 20 – En Jubileumssamling (Sony Music), with Lisa Nilsson
- 2010: Have Yourself A Merry Little Christmas (), with Kurt Nilsen
- 2011: Alvedans (), with Magnar Birkeland
- 2011: Smooth Jazz Cafe 11 (), with Marek Niedźwiecki
- 2011: What Are Words (), with Chris Medina
- 2012: Master Of Imperfection (), with Per Øystein Sørensen
- 2012: Looking Back (), with Tone Damli
- 2012: Real Life Love (), with Chesney Hawkes
- 2012: Rolig EP (), with Jakob Jordal
- 2012: 1949 EP(), with Sveinar Heskestad
- 2013: Alvin Pang (), with Ketil Høegh, Endre Lund Eriksen and Tore Johansen
- 2014: Hus Ved Havet (), with Trond Nilsen
- 2014: Gata Der Jeg Bor (), with Roar Antonsen
- 2014: Hus Ved Havet (), with Trond Nilsen
- 2015: Ingen Gör Det Bättre (Diesel Music), with Lisa Nilsson
- 2015: Samle På Gode Minna (), with Per-Kai Prytz
- 2015: Livet Blir Sjelden Slik Man Har Tenkt Seg (), with Roar Antonsen

With various artists

- 1982: Marathon Rock-82 (Igloo Records), with 'Darria'
- 1988: Vi Synger Julen Inn Med Korene I Bodø Domkirke (Bodø Domkirke)
- 1993: Bodø/Glimt Førr Evig Single (Bodø/Glimt)
- 1993: Det Finns Ikke Maken Single (Bodø/Glimt)
- 1994: Tiddelibom – Bodø Rockeklubb 1979–1994 (Bodø Rockeklubb)
- 2000: Glimt I Øyet (Bodø/Glimt)
- 2001: Distant Reports – Jazz From North Norway (Gemini Records)
- 2005: Venn ()
- 2008: Shockadelica – 50th Anniversary Tribute To The Artist Known As Prince ()
- 2012: Stille, Stille Vinternatt – Musikk Fra Blåfjell ()
