= Looking Back (Tone Damli album) =

Greatest hits album by Tone Damli
- Released: 27 April 2012
- Genre: Pop
- Label: Eccentric Music
- Producer: David Eriksen

Tone Damli chronology
Cocool (2010)	Looking Back (2012)	Heartkill (2014)

Singles from Looking Back
- 1. "Look Back" Released: 29 January 2012; 2. "Imagine" Released: 27 April 2012

Looking Back is Norwegian singer Tone Damli's first greatest hits album, which was released on 27 April 2012. The album peaked at number 13 on the Norwegian Albums Chart. The album includes songs from her last four albums.

== Singles ==
- "Look Back" was released as the lead single from the album on 29 January 2012. The song peaked to number 8 on the Norwegian Singles Chart.
- "Imagine" was released as the second single from the album on 27 April 2012. The song peaked to number 13 on the Norwegian Singles Chart.
- "Stuck in My Head" was released as the third single from the album on 27 April 2011. The song peaked to number 2 on the Norwegian Singles Chart.

== Track listing ==
1. "Look Back" - 3:59
2. "Butterflies" - 3:00
3. "Stuck In My Head" - 3:19
4. "Save Me" (feat. Máddji) - 3:53
5. "I Know" - 3:54
6. "The Bliss Song" - 3:28
7. "I Love You" - 3:38
8. "Summerlove" - 3:58
9. "Imagine" (feat. Eric Saade) - 3:47
10. "Crazy Cool" - 3:18
11. "Fever" - 3:56
12. "Here I Am" - 3:48
13. "Young and Foolish" - 4:00
14. "No Way Out" - 4:04
15. "Ghosts" - 4:15
16. "Somewhere Soft to Land" - 4:13

== Charts ==
Chart (2012)	Peak position
Norwegian Albums Chart	13

== Release history ==
Country	Date	Format	Label
Norway	27 April 2012	CD single, digital download	Eccentric Music
