= I Know =

I Know may refer to:

== Music ==
=== Albums ===
- I Know (Luther Vandross album) or the title song (see below), 1998
- I Know (Tone Damli album) or the title song (see below), 2009
- I Know, by John Gorka, 1987
- I Know, an EP by Bayonne, 2018

=== Songs ===
- "I Know" (Aly & AJ song), 2017
- "I Know" (Dionne Farris song), 1995
- "I Know" (Drake Bell song), 2006
- "I Know" (Jay-Z song), 2008
- "I Know" (Kanii song), 2023
- "I Know" (Luther Vandross song), 1998
- "I Know" (Philip Bailey song), 1983
- "I Know" (Seo Taiji and Boys song), 1992
- "I Know" (Shift K3Y song), 2014
- "I Know" (Tom Odell song), 2013
- "I Know" (Tone Damli song), 2009
- "I Know" (Yo Gotti song), 2013
- "I Know" (YoungBoy Never Broke Again song), 2022
- "I Know (I Know)", by John Lennon, 1973
- "I Know (You Don't Love Me No More)", by Barbara George, 1961
- "I Know ?", by Travis Scott, 2023
- "I Know", by Ashanti from Chapter II, 2003
- "I Know", by B.G. from Checkmate, 2000
- "I Know", by Bo Diddley from Bo Diddley's a Twister, 1962
- "I Know", by Barenaked Ladies from Born on a Pirate Ship, 1996
- "I Know", by Big Daddy Weave from When the Light Comes, 2019
- "I Know", by Big Sean from Dark Sky Paradise, 2015
- "I Know", by Blur, double A-side single with "She's So High", 1990
- "I Know", by Destiny's Child from the soundtrack for The Fighting Temptations, 2003
- "I Know", by Fiona Apple from When the Pawn..., 1999
- "I Know", by Fra Lippo Lippi from In Silence, 1981
- "I Know", by Gucci Mane from Breath of Fresh Air, 2023
- "I Know", by the Hollywood Flames, 1953
- "I Know", by Hybrid from Wide Angle, 1999
- "I Know", by Irma from Letter to the Lord, 2011
- "I Know", by Keke Wyatt from Rated Love, 2016
- "I Know", by Joe Walsh from Songs for a Dying Planet, 1992
- "I Know", by Macklemore from Ben, 2023
- "I Know", by New Atlantic, 1992
- "I Know", by Paul King from Joy, 1987
- "I Know", by Perry Como, 1959
- "I Know", by Pink Sweats, 2019
- "I Know", by Placebo from Placebo, 1996
- "I Know", by Polo G from The Goat, 2020
- "I Know", by Post Malone from Hollywood's Bleeding, 2019
- "I Know", by Se7en, 2006
- "I Know", by Some Velvet Sidewalk, 1988
- "I Know", by Vanilla Ninja from Blue Tattoo, 2005
- "I Know", by Yasmien Kurdi from In the Name of Love, 2005
- "I Know", by YC, 2011

== See also ==
- "Eye No", a 1988 song by Prince
- All I Know (disambiguation)
- I Don't Know (disambiguation)
- IK (disambiguation)
