= Don't Kill My Vibe (disambiguation) =

"Don't Kill My Vibe" is the 2017 debut single by Sigrid.

Don't Kill My Vibe may also refer to:

- Don't Kill My Vibe (EP), Sigrid's 2017 debut EP

== See also ==
- "Bitch, Don't Kill My Vibe", a 2013 song by Kendrick Lamar
