= Look Back =

Look Back may refer to:

- Look Back, film with Natalia Bardo, 2014
- Look Back, film with Gregory Blair, 2016
- Look Back (manga), a Japanese one-shot web manga by Tatsuki Fujimoto, 2021
  - Look Back (2024 film), a Japanese anime film adaptation of the manga
  - Look Back (2026 film), a Japanese live-action film adaptation of the manga
- "Look Back" (song), by Norwegian singer Tone Damli, 2012
- "Look Back", a song by American DJ Diplo from the EP California, 2018
- Lookback option, a type of finance option

== See also ==
- Don't Look Back (disambiguation)
- Lookback distance, a type of astronomical distance
- Looking Back (disambiguation)
- Thirumbi Paar (disambiguation) (lit. 'Look Back'), various Indian films
