= Martin Sjølie =

Norwegian songwriter and record producer

- Born: 25 April 1979 (age 46); Bærum, Akershus, Norway
- Genres: Pop, rock
- Occupations: Singer-songwriter, record producer
- Instruments: Piano, keyboards, programming, backing vocals
- Years active: 2001–present
- Website: Martin Sjølie on SoundCloud

Martin Sjølie (born 25 April 1979 in Bærum) is a Norwegian songwriter and record producer, most known for his work with artists Sigrid, Maria Mena and Dotan. Although he is based at his own Studio in the Park, in Oslo, Norway, he mainly works on projects in the UK. Sjølie has recently worked with, among others, Sam Smith, Ella Henderson, Maiday, Iain James, Lindy Robbins and The Nexus.

== Discography ==
Title	Year	Artist	Album	Songwriter	Producer			
Title	Year	Artist	Album	Songwriter	Primary	Secondary	Additional	Vocal
"Jeg Er Her Stadig"	2001	Christian Brøns	Du Kan Gøre Hvad Du Vil	check				
"Vil Jeg Fortryde"	2001	Christian Brøns	Du Kan Gøre Hvad Du Vil	check				
"Funky Dory"	2003	Rachel Stevens	Funky Dory		check			
"Solid"	2003	Rachel Stevens	Funky Dory		check			
"With a Little Help from My Friends"	2004	Sam & Mark	Non-album single		check			
"The Sun Has Come Our Way"	2004	Sam & Mark	The Sun Has Come Our Way EP		check			
"To Know Your Name"	2004	Lindsay Lohan	Non-album single		check			
"Dumb Dumb"	2005	Rachel Stevens	Come and Get It		check			
"Miss You Love"	2005	Maria Mena	Apparently Unaffected		check			
"Internel Dialogue"	2005	Maria Mena	Apparently Unaffected		check			
"The Bottle of Wine"	2005	Maria Mena	Apparently Unaffected		check			
"Boytoy Baby"	2005	Maria Mena	Apparently Unaffected		check			
"If You'll Stay in My Past (Part 1)"	2005	Maria Mena	Apparently Unaffected		check			
"He's Hurting Me"	2005	Maria Mena	Apparently Unaffected		check			
"Just Hold Me"	2005	Maria Mena	Apparently Unaffected		check			
"Long Time Coming"	2005	Maria Mena	Apparently Unaffected		check			
"If You'll Stay in My Past (Part 2)"	2005	Maria Mena	Apparently Unaffected		check			
"Nevermind Me"	2005	Maria Mena	Apparently Unaffected		check			
"These Shoes"	2005	Maria Mena	Apparently Unaffected		check			
"Our Battles"	2005	Maria Mena	Apparently Unaffected		check			
"Calm Under the Waves"	2005	Maria Mena	Apparently Unaffected		check			
"If You'll Stay in My Past (Part 3)"	2005	Maria Mena	Apparently Unaffected		check			
"The Bliss Song"	2005	Tone Damli Aaberge	Bliss	check				check
"End of an Affair"	2005	Tone Damli Aaberge	Bliss					check
"Keep on Keeping On"	2005	Tone Damli Aaberge	Bliss					check
"The Moon is a Harsh Mistress"	2005	Tone Damli Aaberge	Bliss					check
"Lazy Day in Bed"	2005	Tone Damli Aaberge	Bliss	check				check
"Somewhere Soft to Land"	2005	Tone Damli Aaberge	Bliss	check				check
"Songbird"	2005	Tone Damli Aaberge	Bliss					check
"Everything That I Am"	2005	Tone Damli Aaberge	Bliss	check				check
"High Hopes"	2005	Tone Damli Aaberge	Bliss					check
"I'll Get Myself Together"	2005	Tone Damli Aaberge	Bliss					check
"Burn for You"	2005	Tone Damli Aaberge	Bliss					check
"The Night of My Life"	2006	Stephanie McIntosh	Tightrope			check		
"Lovesong"	2007	Tone Damli Aaberge	Sweet Fever		check			
"Young & Foolish"	2007	Tone Damli Aaberge	Sweet Fever		check			
"How Could You"	2007	Tone Damli Aaberge	Sweet Fever	check	check			
"The Greatest Gift"	2007	Tone Damli Aaberge	Sweet Fever		check			
"Fever"	2007	Tone Damli Aaberge	Sweet Fever	check	check			
"Ghosts"	2007	Tone Damli Aaberge	Sweet Fever		check			
"Hate You"	2007	Tone Damli Aaberge	Sweet Fever	check	check			
"Felicia"	2007	Tone Damli Aaberge	Sweet Fever	check	check			
"Not a Day Goes By"	2007	Tone Damli Aaberge	Sweet Fever		check			
"Rome"	2007	Tone Damli Aaberge	Sweet Fever		check			
"Power Trip Ballad"	2008	Maria Mena	Cause and Effect		check			
"Belly Up"	2008	Maria Mena	Cause and Effect	check	check			
"All This Time (Pick-Me-Up Song)"	2008	Maria Mena	Cause and Effect	check	check			
"Cause and Effect"	2008	Maria Mena	Cause and Effect		check			
"I'm on Your Side"	2008	Maria Mena	Cause and Effect		check			
"Eyesore"	2008	Maria Mena	Cause and Effect		check			
"Where Were You"	2008	Maria Mena	Cause and Effect	check	check			
"I'm in Love"	2008	Maria Mena	Cause and Effect		check			
"Self-Fulfilling Prophecy"	2008	Maria Mena	Cause and Effect		check			
"I Was Made for Lovin' You"	2008	Maria Mena	Cause and Effect		check			
"Dear..."	2008	Maria Mena	Cause and Effect		check			
"Home for Christmas"	2010	Maria Mena	Non-album single	check	check			
"Signals"	2010	Eva & the Heartmaker	Dominoes	check	check			
"Not Alone"	2010	Eva & the Heartmaker	Dominoes	check	check			
"Gone in a Flash"	2010	Eva & the Heartmaker	Dominoes	check	check			
"Out There"	2010	A1	Waiting for Daylight	check	check			
"Viktoria"	2011	Maria Mena	Viktoria	check	check			
"Homeless"	2011	Maria Mena	Viktoria	check	check			
"The Art of Forgiveness"	2011	Maria Mena	Viktoria	check	check			
"Habits"	2011	Maria Mena	Viktoria	check	check			
"My Heart Still Beats"	2011	Maria Mena	Viktoria	check	check			
"This Too Shall Pass"	2011	Maria Mena	Viktoria	check	check			
"Takes One to Know One"	2011	Maria Mena	Viktoria	check	check			
"Money"	2011	Maria Mena	Viktoria	check	check			
"It Took Me By Surprise"	2011	Maria Mena	Viktoria	check	check			
"Secrets"	2011	Maria Mena	Viktoria	check	check			
"Am I Supposed to Apologize?"	2011	Maria Mena	Viktoria	check	check			
"Summer Rain"	2011	Chris Medina	What Are Words	check	check			
"Flawed"	2012	Frida Amundsen	September Blue	check	check			
"Echo of Me"	2012	Frida Amundsen	September Blue	check	check			
"One in a Million"	2012	Bertine Zetlitz	Electric Feet	check				
"Pop Pop Pop"	2012	Bertine Zetlitz	Electric Feet	check				
"Too Late"	2013	Eva & the Heartmaker	Traces of You		check			
"Traces of You"	2013	Eva & the Heartmaker	Traces of You	check	check			
"Hold Your Love"	2013	Eva & the Heartmaker	Traces of You	check	check			
"Comes Around"	2013	Eva & the Heartmaker	Traces of You	check				
"All The Love"	2013	Maria Mena	Weapon in Mind	check	check			
"I Always Likes That"	2013	Maria Mena	Weapon in Mind	check	check			
"I Love You Too"	2013	Maria Mena	Weapon in Mind	check	check			
"Hungry"	2014	Dotan	7 Layers	check				
"Waves"	2014	Dotan	7 Layers	check				
"Casablanca"	2015	Mark Feehily	Fire	check	check			
"The Fall"	2015	Mark Feehily	Fire	check	check			
"Good God"	2015	Maria Mena	Growing Pains	check	check			
"The Baby"	2015	Maria Mena	Growing Pains	check	check			
"Leaving You"	2015	Maria Mena	Growing Pains	check	check			
"Good and Bad"	2015	Maria Mena	Growing Pains	check	check			
"Confess !"	2015	Maria Mena	Growing Pains	check	check			
"Where I Come From"	2015	Maria Mena	Growing Pains	check	check			
"Bend Till I Break"	2015	Maria Mena	Growing Pains	check	check			
"You Deserve Better"	2015	Maria Mena	Growing Pains	check	check			
"Growing Pains"	2015	Maria Mena	Growing Pains	check	check			
"Mary's Story"	2016	Ina Wroldsen	Non-album single		check			
"Good Things Come to Those Who Wait"	2016	Nathan Sykes	Unfinished Business	check	check			
"Vekk Meg Opp"	2017	Gabrielle	Vekk Meg Opp EP	check	check			
"Don't Kill My Vibe"	2017	Sigrid	Sucker Punch	check	check			
"Fake Friends"	2017	Sigrid	Don't Kill My Vibe EP	check	check			
"Strangers"	2017	Sigrid	Sucker Punch	check	check			
"Raw"	2018	Sigrid	Raw EP		check			
"High Five"	2018	Sigrid	Raw EP	check	check			
"Schedules"	2018	Sigrid	Raw EP		check			
"Forgotten Love"	2018	Aurora	Infections of a Different Kind – Step I	check				
"Sucker Punch"	2018	Sigrid	Sucker Punch	check	check			
"Mine Right Now"	2019	Sigrid	Sucker Punch	check	check			
"Basic"	2019	Sigrid	Sucker Punch		check			
"Level Up"	2019	Sigrid	Sucker Punch	check	check			
"Never Mine"	2019	Sigrid	Sucker Punch	check	check			
"Friends"	2020	BTS	Map of the Soul: 7	check				
"The Lucky Ones"	2021	Pentatonix	The Lucky Ones	check				
"A Second to Midnight"	2021	Kylie Minogue and Years & Years	Disco: Guest List Edition	check				
