= Sweet Fever =

Studio album by Tone Damli
- Released: 8 May 2007
- Recorded: 2006/07
- Genre: Pop
- Label: Eccentric Music
- Producer: David Eriksen, Martin Sjølie

Tone Damli chronology
Bliss (2005)	Sweet Fever (2007)	I Know (2009)

Sweet Fever is the Norwegian singer, Tone Damli's second studio album, which was released on 8 May 2007. It was produced by David Eriksen and Martin Sjølie. The album peaked at number 8 on the Norwegian Albums Chart.

== Track listing ==
1. "Lovesong" – 4:00
2. "Young & Foolish" – 4:02
3. "How Could You" – 3:27
4. "The Greatest Gift" – 3:50
5. "Fever" – 3:58
6. "Ghosts" – 4:16
7. "Hate You" – 3:47
8. "Felicia" – 4:14
9. "Not A Day Goes By" – 4:10
10. "Rome" – 3:22

== Charts ==
Chart (2007)	Peak position
Norwegian Albums Chart	8

== Release history ==
Country	Date	Format	Label
Norway	8 May 2007	CD single, digital download	Eccentric Music
