= You're the Only One (Maria Mena song) =

2004 single by Maria Mena

Single by Maria Mena

from the album Mellow and White Turns Blue
- B-side: "Patience"; "Sleep to Dream"
- Released: 13 January 2004
- Genre: Pop
- Length: 2:45
- Label: Columbia
- Songwriters: Maria Mena; Arvid Solvang
- Producer: Arvid Solvang

Maria Mena singles chronology
"My Lullaby" (2002)	"You're the Only One" (2004)	"Just a Little Bit" (2004)

Music video
- "You're the Only One" on YouTube

"You're the Only One" is a song by Norwegian pop musician Maria Mena. The song was included on her second studio album, Mellow (as well as the international version, White Turns Blue), and was released as the album's first single in January 2004. In addition to reaching number eight in her native Norway, it was Mena's breakthrough hit internationally, charting within the top 40 in Denmark, the Netherlands and New Zealand. It was her first single released in the United States, where it rose to number 86 on the Billboard Hot 100.

== Lyrical content ==
A DVD included with the deluxe edition of White Turns Blue contains an interview with Mena. She stated "You're the Only One" is about all of her friends, each verse representing a different person, but she liked that it could be interpreted to be about one boy. She said that it is her way of telling her friends that she appreciates what they do for her and that she loves them.

== Critical reception ==
Sony Music Norway reviewed "You're the Only One" in early 2004, writing that the single "lives up to expectations" and calling it "irresistible". AllMusic critic Johnny Loftus gave a positive review, praising its "shimmery" composition Mena's "chatty" vocals. He also noted that, unlike American pop princesses such as Hilary Duff, Mena did not mitigate her blunt lyrics regarding teenage experimentation. Loftus summarized, "Her mix of emotionally rich pragmatism with lighthearted amiability is delightful, and only heightened by "Only One"'s inviting pop whir."

== Release and chart performance ==
"You're the Only One" was released as the first single from Mellow in Norway on 13 January 2004. It appeared on the country's VG-lista chart at number 11 on the ninth chart week of 2004, which corresponds to late February. Two weeks later, it peaked at number eight, then remained in the top 10 for two more weeks before dropping out.

In June, the single began to experience success outside Norway. Following plentiful radio airplay, it debuted at number 88 on the US Billboard Hot 100 on the issue dated 12 June, then reached its peak of number 86 the following week. As of 2026, it is Mena's only song to appear on the Hot 100. It also appeared on the Billboard Mainstream Top 40 and Adult Top 40 charts, peaking at numbers 25 and 31, respectively. On 28 June, the track debuted at number 36 on the New Zealand Singles Chart and peaked at number 35 during its second week in, then left the top 50.

"You're the Only One" continued to chart throughout July, August, and September in several other countries. In Denmark, it debuted and peaked at number 15 on 23 July, then rose to number 19 on the Dutch Single Top 100 eight days later. In Australia, the single peaked at number 70, while in the Flanders region of Belgium, it reached number six on the Ultratip Bubbling Under listing.

== Track listings ==
Norwegian CD1 and US CD single

1. "You're the Only One" – 2:45
2. "Patience" – 3:49

Norwegian CD2

1. "You're the Only One" – 2:44
2. "Patience" – 3:49
3. "Sleep to Dream" – 3:38
4. "You're the Only One" (video) – 2:44

Australian and New Zealand maxi-CD single

1. "You're the Only One" – 2:44
2. "Patience" – 3:49
3. "Sleep to Dream" – 3:38

== Credits and personnel ==
Credits are lifted from the US CD single liner notes.

Studios

- Mixed at Lydlab Studio (Oslo, Norway)
- Mastered at Cutting Room Studios (Stockholm, Sweden)

Personnel

- Maria Mena – writing, vocals
- Arvid Solvang – writing, acoustic guitars, electric guitars, piano, production, programming
- Vemund Stavnes – bass
- Fredrik Wallumrød – drums
- Celsius – keyboard, additional programming
- Ulf Holand – mixing
- Thomas Eberger – mastering

== Charts ==
Chart (2004)	Peak position
Australia (ARIA)	70
Belgium (Ultratip Bubbling Under Flanders)	6
Denmark (Tracklisten)	15
Netherlands (Dutch Top 40)	30
Netherlands (Single Top 100)	19
New Zealand (Recorded Music NZ)	35
Norway (VG-lista)	8
US Billboard Hot 100	86
US Adult Pop Airplay (Billboard)	31
US Pop Airplay (Billboard)	25

== Release history ==
Region	Date	Format(s)	Label(s)	Ref.
Norway	13 January 2004	CD; maxi-CD	Columbia	
United States	26 April 2004	Contemporary hit radio	Columbia	
Denmark	5 July 2004	CD	Columbia	
Australia	19 July 2004	CD	Columbia	
