= Andre Lindal =

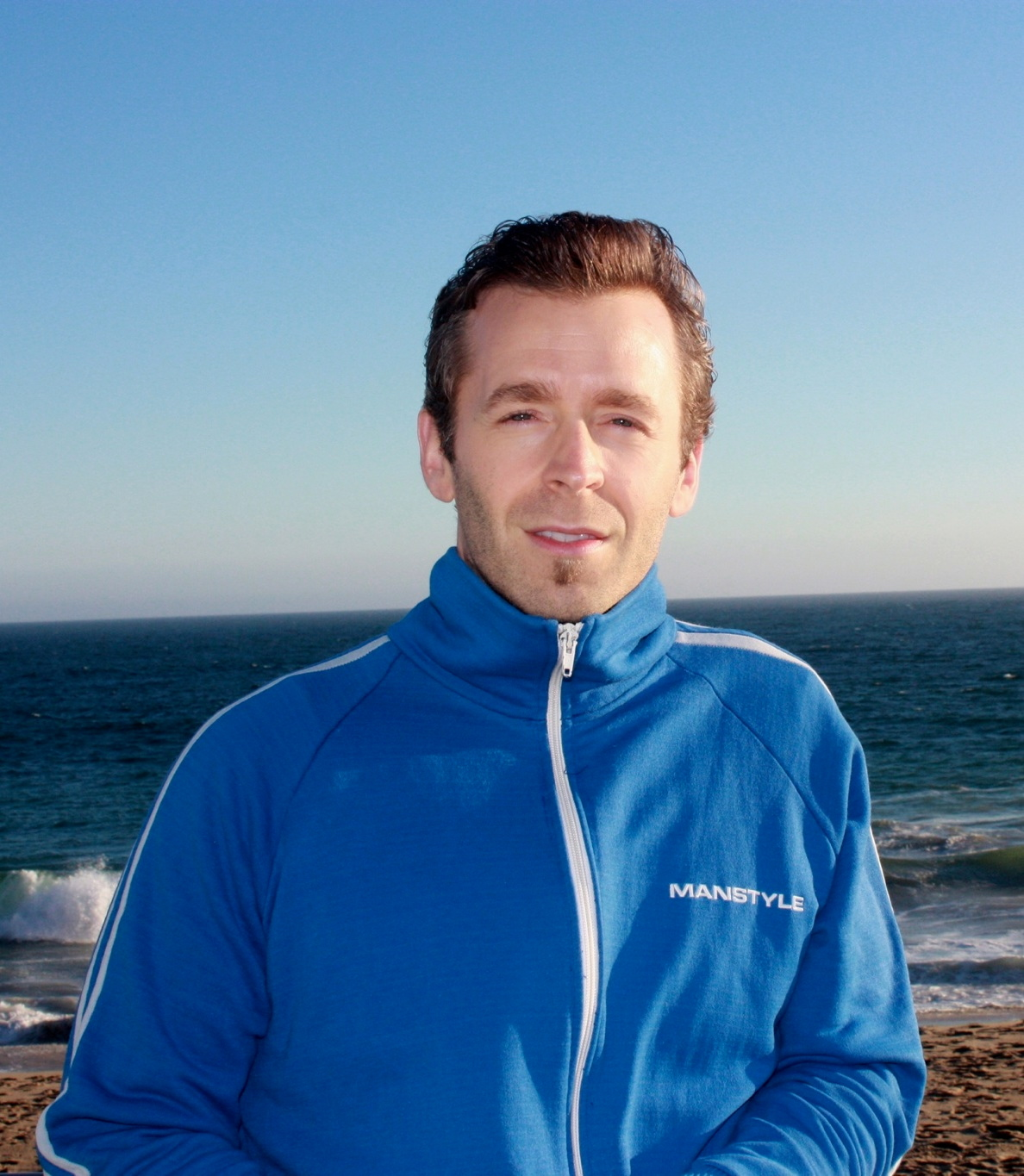

Background information
- Born: February 19, 1977 (age 49)
- Origin: Oslo, Norway
- Genres: R&B, hip hop, pop
- Occupations: Musician, record producer, songwriter
- Years active: 2000–present
- Website: www.lindalmusicinc.com

Andre Lindal (born February 19, 1977) is a Norwegian songwriter, record producer and musician from Oslo, now based in Los Angeles. He has produced for many popular artists and groups, including Maroon 5, Britney Spears, Justin Bieber, Kelly Clarkson, Nelly Furtado and Chris Medina. After receiving a Grammy nomination for his work with Monica in 2011, he received a Grammy win when Kelly Clarkson's Stronger took home the Best Pop Vocal Album in 2013.

== Biography ==
Lindal grew up in Hauketo, a small suburb of Oslo, and moved to the US to pursue a degree in Music Production & Engineering from Berklee College of Music in Boston, Massachusetts. After graduating Cum Laude in 2004, he moved to Los Angeles.

== Songwriting and production ==
In 2010, Lindal co-wrote and produced the Monica song "Believing in Me" with the producing team, Stargate. The song was included in the album Still Standing which earned Lindal his first Grammy nomination for Best R&B Album. In 2011, Andre was introduced to Rodney Jerkins and was immediately signed to his production team, Darkchild. Within a month, the duo wrote and produced the song "What Are Words" for American Idol Season 10 contestant Chris Medina that sat at the top of the Scandinavian music charts for over 19 weeks straight. They also wrote and produced the song "I Forgive You" for Kelly Clarkson's latest album, Stronger, that has been certified Platinum by the RIAA. In addition, Jerkins and Lindal have worked on music for television, teaming up with executive producer, Nick Cannon, on the soundtrack for the Nickelodeon movie, Rags. The soundtrack peaked at #1 on the iTunes soundtrack albums chart and #3 on the Top 100 albums on iTunes chart.

Justin Bieber single, "As Long As You Love Me", from Believe was written and produced by the duo; it was released on June 11, 2012, as a promotional single and later on July 10, 2012, as a radio single. The music video, featuring Kill Bill and Reservoir Dogs star Michael Madsen, was released on August 1, 2012, and has been on top of YouTube 100 since its debut.

The song "My Heart Is Open featuring Gwen Stefani" was written by Adam Levine, Benjamin Levin, Sia, Rodney Jerkins, and Lindal, with production from Benny Blanco, Darkchild, Lindal, and Levine.

Levine and Stefani performed the song at the 57th Grammy Awards on February 8, 2015. The song is also included on the set list for Maroon 5's 2015 world tour, Maroon 5 World Tour 2015.

=== Discography ===
| Year | Song | Album | Artist | Chart position | | | | |
| Year | Song | Album | Artist | Billboard 200 | UK Albums Chart | Billboard Pop Singles | Hot 100 | UK |
|---|---|---|---|---|---|---|---|---|
| 2008 | "Fall" | Chasing Lights | The Saturdays | - | 9 | - | - | - |
| 2010 | "Believing in Me" | Still Standing | Monica | 2 | - | - | - | - |
| 2011 | "What Are Words" | What Are Words | Chris Medina | - | - | - | 83 | - |
| 2011 | "I Forgive You" | Stronger | Kelly Clarkson | 2 | 5 | - | - | - |
| 2012 | "I've Got the Music in Me" | Kohl's commercial | Jennifer Lopez | - | - | - | - | - |
| 2012 | Rags Songs | Rags Movie Soundtrack | Rags Cast | - | - | - | - | - |
| 2012 | "As Long As You Love Me” | Believe | Justin Bieber | 1 | 1 | 3 | 6 | 22 |
| 2012 | "She Don't Like the Lights” | Believe | Justin Bieber | 1 | 1 | - | - | - |
| 2012 | "Miracles" | The Spirit Indestructible | Nelly Furtado | 79 | 46 | - | - | - |
| 2013 | "As Long As You Love Me” | Believe Acoustic | Justin Bieber | 1 | 4 | - | - | - |
| 2013 | "She Don't Like the Lights” | Believe Acoustic | Justin Bieber | 1 | 4 | - | - | - |
| 2013 | "Tik Tik Boom" | Britney Jean | Britney Spears | 4 | 34 | - | - | - |
| 2014 | "My Heart Is Open" | V | Maroon 5 | 1 | 4 | - | - | - |
