= Viktoria (Maria Mena album) =

Studio album by Maria Mena
- Released: 23 September 2011
- Genre: Pop, folk, rock
- Length: 36:03
- Label: Sony Music, Columbia
- Producer: Martin Sjølie

Maria Mena chronology
Cause and Effect (2008)	Viktoria (2011)	Weapon in Mind (2013)

Viktoria is the fifth studio album by Norwegian singer-songwriter Maria Mena. Like Cause and Effect, Viktoria is also produced by Martin Sjølie.

== Track listing ==
All tracks are written by Maria Mena and Martin Sjølie.

No.	Title	Length
1.	"Viktoria"	3:10
2.	"Homeless"	3:15
3.	"The Art of Forgiveness"	2:56
4.	"Habits" (featuring Mads Langer)	3:44
5.	"My Heart Still Beats"	3:19
6.	"This Too Shall Pass"	3:22
7.	"Takes One to Know One"	3:55
8.	"Money"	2:46
9.	"It Took Me by Surprise"	3:00
10.	"Secrets"	2:59
11.	"Am I Supposed to Apologize?"	3:43

German bonus track
No.	Title	Length
12.	"A Stranger to Me"	2:53

== Singles ==
- "This Too Shall Pass" (2011)
- "Homeless" (2011)
- "Viktoria" (2011)
- "A Stranger to Me" (2011): due to large requests from fans, the formerly Germany exclusive song was also released as a single in other countries.

== Charts ==
Chart performance for Viktoria
Chart (2011–2012)	Peak position
Austrian Albums (Ö3 Austria)	29
German Albums (Offizielle Top 100)	18
Dutch Albums (Album Top 100)	17
Norwegian Albums (VG-lista)	2
Swiss Albums (Schweizer Hitparade)	13

== Certifications ==
Region	Certification	Certified units/sales
Norway (IFPI Norway)	Gold	15,000^{*}
^{*} Sales figures based on certification alone.
