= Imagine (Tone Damli song) =

Single by Tone Damli featuring Eric Saade

from the album Looking Back
- Released: 27 April 2012
- Recorded: 2011
- Genre: Pop
- Length: 3:47
- Label: Eccentric Music
- Songwriter(s): Lukasz Duchnowski; Jason Gill; Leslie Tay; Eric Saade; Julimar Santos

Tone Damli singles chronology
"Look Back" (2012)	"Imagine" (2012)	"Hello Goodbye" (2013)

Eric Saade singles chronology
"Hotter Than Fire" (2011)	"Imagine" (2012)	"Coming Home" (2013)

"Imagine" is a song performed by Norwegian singer Tone Damli as a duet with Eric Saade. The song is from her fifth studio album Looking Back (2012). It was written per request by and features vocals from Swedish singer Eric Saade. It was released in Norway as a digital download on 27 April 2012.

== Music video ==
A music video to accompany the release of "Imagine" was first released onto YouTube on 26 June 2012 at a total length of three minutes and fifty-nine seconds. It features a love story between Damli and Saade, where she is set to marry someone, but only has eyes for Saade. The video was shot in Ibiza.

== Live performances ==
Damli and Saade have performed the song on Norwegian television on several occasions, once at the Norwegian television show "Allsang på Grensen" and once on "God Morgen Norge". They also performed the song on two live concerts as a part of the VG Lista 2012 tour, in Oslo and Stavanger.

== Track listing ==
"Imagine" digital download
No.	Title	Length
1.	"Imagine" (featuring Eric Saade)	3:47

== Chart performance ==
Chart performance for "Imagine"
Chart (2012)	Peak position
Norway (VG-lista)	9
Sweden (Sverigetopplistan)	49

== Certifications ==
Certifications for "Imagine"
Region	Certification	Certified units/sales
Norway (IFPI Norway)	Platinum	10,000^{*}
Sweden (GLF)	Gold	20,000^{‡}
^{*} Sales figures based on certification alone.^{‡} Sales+streaming figures based on certification alone.

== Release history ==
Release history and formats for "Imagine"
Region	Date	Format	Label	Ref.
Norway	27 April 2012	Digital download	Eccentric Music	
