= Cause and Effect (Maria Mena album) =

Cause And Effect

Studio album by Maria Mena
- Released: 15 September 2008
- Genres: Pop, folk, rock
- Length: 38:20
- Labels: Sony Music, Columbia
- Producer: Martin Sjølie

Maria Mena chronology
Apparently Unaffected (2005)	Cause And Effect (2008)	Viktoria (2011)

Cause and Effect is the fourth album by the Norwegian singer-songwriter Maria Mena. "Belly Up" was the first single of the album, but only released in her home country. "All This Time" was the 2nd single in Norway and the first single released in the rest of Europe. A music video for "All This Time" aired on VH1 Europe.

== Track listing ==
No.	Title	Writer(s)	Length
1.	"Power Trip Ballad"	Maria Mena and Arvid Solvang	4:00
2.	"Belly Up"	Maria Mena and Martin Sjølie	4:06
3.	"All This Time (Pick-Me-Up Song)"	Maria Mena and Martin Sjølie	3:12
4.	"Cause and Effect"	Maria Mena and Arvid Solvang	3:13
5.	"I'm on Your Side"	Maria Mena and Arvid Solvang	3:04
6.	"Eyesore"	Maria Mena and Arvid Solvang	3:16
7.	"Where Were You?"	Maria Mena and Martin Sjølie	3:16
8.	"I'm in Love"	Maria Mena and Arvid Solvang	2:59
9.	"Self-Fulfilling Prophecy"	Maria Mena and Arvid Solvang	3:20
10.	"I Was Made for Lovin' You"	Paul Stanley, Desmond Child and Vincent Poncia Jr.	4:34
11.	"Dear..."	Maria Mena and Arvid Solvang	3:21
12.	"It Must Have Been Love (iTunes Bonus Track)"	Per Gessle	4:06
13.	"You're Scaring Me (iTunes Bonus Track)"	Maria Mena	3:21

== Singles ==
- "Belly Up" (2008)
- "All This Time (Pick-Me-Up Song)" (2008)
- "I'm In Love" (2009)
- "I Was Made For Lovin' You" (2009)

== Charts and certifications ==
=== Weekly charts ===
Chart (2008)	Peak position
Austrian Albums (Ö3 Austria)	23
Dutch Albums (Album Top 100)	8
German Albums (Offizielle Top 100)	20
Norwegian Albums (VG-lista)	4
Swiss Albums (Schweizer Hitparade)	13

=== Year-end charts ===
Chart (2008)	Position
Dutch Albums (Album Top 100)	81
Chart (2009)	Position
Dutch Albums (Album Top 100)	68

=== Certifications ===
Region	Certification	Certified units/sales
Germany (BVMI)	Gold	100,000^{^}
Netherlands (NVPI)	Gold	30,000^{^}
Norway (IFPI Norway)	Platinum	30,000^{*}
Switzerland (IFPI Switzerland)	Gold	15,000^{^}
^{*} Sales figures based on certification alone.^{^} Shipments figures based on certification alone.
