= What Are Words =

Single by Chris Medina

from the album What Are Words
- Released: February 25, 2011
- Recorded: February 21, 2011
- Genre: Pop
- Length: 3:07
- Label: Interscope, 19
- Songwriters: Rodney Jerkins, Andre Lindal, Lauren Christy
- Producers: Rodney Jerkins, Andre Lindal

Chris Medina singles chronology
| "What Are Words" (2011) | "One More Time" (2011) |

"What Are Words" is a song written by Rodney Jerkins, Andre Lindal and Lauren Christy, and performed by American singer Chris Medina. It was released on February 25, 2011, the day after his elimination on the reality TV show American Idol. The song is a tribute to his fiancée who suffered a brain injury as the result of a car wreck and is about promises, commitment and keeping your word.

== Live performances ==
Medina performed the ballad on The Tonight Show with Jay Leno on February 28, 2011, and on Good Morning America on March 4, 2011, as well as twice in Norway in June 2011. Once in front of approximately a hundred-thousand people at the free annual concert VG-Lista at Rådhusplassen, Oslo, being broadcast on nationwide television. One day later he performed again at ULOBAs (a Norwegian organisation to help disabled people) television-broadcast show "Stolthetsprisen", where the organisation awarded a prize to a disabled person for helping other people in the same situation to improve their way of living. Medina, as well as other artists performed at the show. Medina also performed the song during the President's Star Charity show in Singapore on 31 July 2011 to raise funds for the disabled.

== Humanitarianism ==
In the wake of the 2011 Norway terrorist attacks, Medina was contacted by the family of Monica Iselin Didriksen, a victim of the massacre whose favorite song was "What Are Words," and was subsequently invited to Norway to sing at her funeral in Fana church. Medina cleared his schedule and traveled to Norway to perform the song with little media coverage and fanfare.

== Chart performance ==
The song debuted at number 22 on the Billboard Heatseekers Songs chart, and number 83 on the Billboard Hot 100. It has since sold 49,000 copies in the United States.

The single reached number one on the Norwegian VG-lista chart on April 29, 2011 and remained at the top for 11 straight weeks. It is certified 4× platinum in Norway.
The single also went to number one in Singapore on May 13, 2011, for a three-week run.
The single went number one in Sweden on July 1, 2011, and remained for 8 straight weeks. It was awarded a 2× platinum certification in Sweden on September 20, 2011.

=== Weekly charts ===
| Chart (2011–2012) | Peak position |
|---|---|
| Denmark (Tracklisten) | 19 |
| Norway (VG-lista) | 1 |
| Sweden (Sverigetopplistan) | 1 |
| US Billboard Hot 100 | 83 |

=== Year-end charts ===
| Chart (2011) | Position |
|---|---|
| Sweden (Sverigetopplistan) | 11 |

== Release history ==
| Region | Date | Format | Label |
|---|---|---|---|
| Norway | 25 March 2011 | Digital download | 19 Recordings |
