= We Try (Chris Medina) =

Song by Chris Medina
- Language: English
- Written: Chris Medina, Jason Gill, Tormod Løkling, Julimar Santos
- Released: January 25, 2019
- Genre: Pop
- Length: 3:06
- Producer(s): Tormod Løkling

Chris Medina singles chronology
"Cut Me" (2018)	"We Try" (2019)

"We Try" is a song of the American singer Chris Medina. Medina performed with the song in Melodi Grand Prix 2019 but didn't get into the final.
