= Weapon in Mind =

Studio album by Maria Mena
- Released: September 23, 2013
- Genre: Pop, folk, rock
- Length: 43:10
- Label: Sony Music

Maria Mena chronology
Viktoria (2011)	Weapon in Mind (2013)	Growing Pains (2015)

Weapon in Mind is the sixth studio album by Norwegian singer-songwriter Maria Mena. All songs are written by Mena, and composed by Mena and Mats Lie Skåre, Thomas Eriksen and Martin Sjølie, which are listed in the track list. The first single "Fuck You" was released on March 18, 2013. The second single "I Always Liked That" was released on June 21, 2013.

== Track listing ==
No.	Title	Writer(s)	Length
1.	"Interesting"	Maria Mena, Mats Lie Skåre	3:02
2.	"Fuck You"	Mena, Eriksen Thomas, Skåre	3:14
3.	"All the Love"	Mena, Martin Sjølie	3:41
4.	"I Always Liked That"	Mena, Sjølie	3:41
5.	"Madness"	Mena, Skåre	3:08
6.	"I Love You Too"	Mena, Sjølie	2:54
7.	"You Make Me Feel Good"	Mena, Skåre	3:07
8.	"Caught Off Guard, Floored by Love"	Mena, Eriksen	3:46
9.	"You're All Telling Stories"	Mena, Skåre	3:51
10.	"Lover Let Me In"	Mena, Eriksen	3:34
11.	"I'm Only Human"	Mena, Skåre	3:06
12.	"You Hurt the Ones You Love (I Don't Believe That)"	Mena, Skåre	3:04
13.	"The End"	Mena, Eriksen	3:02

Amazon Germany bonus track
No.	Title	Writer(s)	Length
14.	"No"	Mena	2:58

== Singles ==
- "Fuck You" (2013)
- "I Always Liked That" (2013)
- "All The Love" (2013)

== Charts ==
Chart (2013)	Peak position
Belgian Albums (Ultratop Flanders)	161
Dutch Albums (Album Top 100)	14
German Albums (Offizielle Top 100)	59
Norwegian Albums (VG-lista)	1
Swiss Albums (Schweizer Hitparade)	30
