= Heartkill =

EP by Tone Damli
- Released: 20 January 2014
- Recorded: 2012–2013
- Genre: Pop; Europop; pop rock
- Label: Eccentric Music
- Producer: David Eriksen

Tone Damli chronology
Looking Back (2012)	Heartkill (2014)	Di Første Jul (2014)

Singles from Heartkill
- 1. "Smash " Released: 14 December 2012; 2. "Hello Goodbye" Released: February 2013; 3. "Winner of a Losing Game " Released: 17 June 2013; 4. "Perfect World " Released: 9 September 2013; 5. "Heartkill" Released: January 2014

Heartkill is Norwegian singer Tone Damli's first extended play. The EP was released on 20 January 2014.

== Track listing ==
1. "Heartkill" - 3:23
2. "Winner of a Losing Game" - 3:50
3. "Perfect World" - 3:23
4. "Smash" - 3:33
5. "Hello Goodbye" (featuring Erik Segerstedt) - 3:09

== Charts ==
Chart (2014/15)	Peak position
Norwegian Albums Chart	9

== Release history ==
Country	Date	Format	Label
Worldwide	20 January 2014	CD single, digital download	Eccentric Music
