= Plot Twist (Sigrid song) =

Single by Sigrid

from the EP Don't Kill My Vibe
- Released: 14 July 2017
- Recorded: 2016
- Genre: Trip hop; synth-pop
- Length: 3:25
- Label: Island Records; Universal Music Group
- Songwriter(s): Sigrid Solbakk Raabe; George Flint; Henry Flint
- Producer(s): George Flint; Henry Flint

Sigrid singles chronology
"Don't Kill My Vibe" (2017)	"Plot Twist" (2017)	"Strangers" (2017)

Music video
- "Plot Twist" on YouTube

"Plot Twist" is a song by Norwegian singer-songwriter Sigrid from her debut extended play (EP) Don't Kill My Vibe (2017). The song was released as a digital download on 14 July 2017 by Island Records as the EP's second single. A trip hop and synth-pop track, the song's lyrics see Sigrid "finally getting over someone." A remixes single, which includes a remix by Disciples and an acoustic version of the song, was released on 21 July 2017. The song was well received by music critics, several of whom praised its catchy sound.

The song was accompanied by a music video, which was released on 7 July 2017. In it, Sigrid appears in the streets of Bergen and shows several clips with VHS aesthetic, one of them being a party Sigrid threw at her former flat. The song reached number 44 in Belgium and was certified gold in Norway by the International Federation of the Phonographic Industry (IFPI).

== Background and release ==
At the age of 16, Sigrid wrote her first song, "Sun" after her brother, who is also a musician, told her to stop performing cover versions of Adele songs at performances and challenged her to write a song that she could perform at one of his gigs. In 2013, she released "Sun" as her debut single. The song received airplay on Norwegian radio stations. She signed to Petroleum Records the following year, and performed at festivals such as Øyafestivalen. In September 2016, after executives heard the demo of her song "Don't Kill My Vibe", Sigrid signed with Island Records.

Sigrid co-wrote "Plot Twist" with the members of the British duo Oceaán, Henry and George Flint. The song was officially released worldwide on 14 July 2017. The song was released as the EP's second and final single on 14 July 2017. A remixes single was released on 21 July 2017 and features a remix by Disciples and an acoustic version of the song.

== Composition ==
"Plot Twist" is a trip hop and synth-pop song that, lyrically, talks about "finally getting over someone." When asked in an interview if the track could be described as "angry", she considered it more as "sassy" but agreed that "it's good to get [your feelings] out."

== Critical reception ==
Jason Lipshutz, writing for Billboard, described "Plot Twist as "a collection of a half-dozen refrains that would be maddeningly catchy on their own." James Barker of The Edge likened the track as a "a pop lover's dream, with a fast moving beat complimenting Sigrid's ever-rebellious aura and gleeful 'Shots fired!' shouts."

== Music video ==
An accompanying music video was uploaded to Sigrid's YouTube channel on 7 July 2017. The "home-recording-styled" video was filmed in Bergen by Sigurd Fossen and William Glandberger of Fillin Productions. Sigrid said that she wanted to give the video a VHS aesthetic to watch "an insight into my everyday life". She added that the intercuts that appear in the last chorus were filmed at a party where Sigrid invited her friends to her former flat, which she concluded, "it turned out to be a really nice way to end the shoot." As of 11 April 2021, it has gained over 11.5 million views.

== Track listing ==
Digital download and streaming
No.	Title	Length
1.	"Plot Twist"	3:25

Digital download and streaming – remixes single
No.	Title	Length
1.	"Plot Twist" (Disciples remix)	4:53
2.	"Plot Twist" (acoustic)	3:37

== Charts ==
Chart (2017)	Peak position
Belgium (Ultratip Bubbling Under Flanders)	44

== Certifications ==
Region	Certification	Certified units/sales
Norway (IFPI Norway)	Gold	30,000^{‡}
^{‡} Sales+streaming figures based on certification alone.

== Release history ==
Region	Date	Format	Label	Ref.
Norway	14 July 2017	Digital download; streaming	Island; Universal Music Group	
