= Don't Kill My Vibe (EP) =

EP by Sigrid
- Released: 5 May 2017
- Recorded: 2016–2017
- Studio: Lydriket (Bergen)
- Genre: Pop
- Length: 13:41
- Label: Island; Petroleum
- Producer: Martin Sjølie; George Flint; Henry Flint; Askjell Solstrand

Sigrid chronology
Don't Kill My Vibe (2017)	Raw (2018)

Singles from Don't Kill My Vibe
- 1. "Don't Kill My Vibe" Released: 10 February 2017; 2. "Plot Twist" Released: 14 July 2017

Don't Kill My Vibe is the debut extended play (EP) by Norwegian singer-songwriter Sigrid. It was released on 5 May 2017 by Island Records. Following the popularity of her song "Sun" in her native Norway, Sigrid began working on several tracks that would later become an EP. She collaborated with producers Martin Sjølie, George Flint, Henry Flint, and Askjell Solstrand during its recording. A pop record, it includes elements of electropop, trip hop, synth-pop and acoustic pop. The lyrics are heavily inspired by Sigrid's experience as a young woman in the musical industry and situations people her age might encounter.

Don't Kill my Vibe was supported by the release of two official singles and one promotional single, all of which were supplemented by music videos. The lead single "Don't Kill My Vibe" and "Plot Twist" were respectively released 10 February was released on 10 February and 14 July, and reached numbers 193 and 88 in Norway. The song "Dynamite" was released as the EP's only promotional single on 28 April 2017. The title track and "Dynamite", which first appeared in the EP, were later included on Sigrid's debut studio album, Sucker Punch (2019).

The EP received positive reviews from music critics, who praised Sigrid's vocals and lyrics. Commercially, it peaked at number 19 on the Billboard Heatseekers Albums chart.

== Background and production ==
"The beautiful thing about writing sessions is that you can click with a person 100%. [sic] I think it's cliche for every songwriter to say, 'Oh, I get to talk about my deepest emotions. This is my therapy.' But it's totally true. You get to talk about your feelings and where you're at in your life in that moment. It's really nice."

— Sigrid describing the songwriting process of Don't Kill My Vibe.

At the age of 16, Sigrid wrote her first song, "Sun" after her brother, who is also a musician, told her to stop performing cover versions of Adele songs at performances and challenged her to write a song that she could perform at one of his gigs. In 2013, she released "Sun" as her debut single. The song received airplay on Norwegian radio stations. She signed to Petroleum Records the following year, and performed at festivals such as Øyafestivalen. Sigrid went to a meeting with her future manager Geir Luedy at a show of Norwegian artist dePresno. Initial production sessions followed in Bergen and Berlin, however, Luedy realized that the new production "wasn't what we were looking for."

Sigrid was paired with Norwegian producer Martin Sjølie, and together they finished the demo of the song "Don't Kill My Vibe" that was sent to Luedy. In September 2016, after executives heard that demo, Sigrid signed with Island Records and continued working with the rest of the EP. The title track, which was originally a piano ballad, was reworked when Sigrid and Sjølie thought the song needed "[more] production" after listening to the chorus. "Dynamite" (Acoustic) was written with her friend, Askjell Solstrand, which became their first writing session together. For the EP, she collaborated with musicians Sjølie, George Flint, Henry Flint and Solstrand; all of them are credit as both songwriters and producers of the record.

== Composition ==
Don't Kill My Vibe has been described as a pop EP with elements of electropop, trip hop, synth-pop and acoustic pop. Sigrid explained that for the record she composed vocal melodies before writing the lyrics; for the title track she used one day finding out the melodies, while the next day was exclusively made for songwriting. The EP is characterised by having an aggressive sound and raspy vocals. The lyrics were described as "intensely relatable and wonderfully frank," which are inspired by her experience as a young woman in the music industry and situations people her age might encounter. Abigail Hyland of The Line of Best Fit wrote that the EP "[vocalises] a problem that's been festering at the core of the music industry since its beginnings; for too long female artists have been subject to manipulation and oppression from men in positions of power".

Don't Kill My Vibe opens with its title track, a melodic electropop anthem inspired by a difficult session where Sigrid felt her voice and opinion was being diminished. It includes big, booming vocals, neon-tinged production and a euphoric chorus. The following track, "Plot Twist", is a trip hop and synth-pop song about "finally getting over someone." When asked in an interview if the track could be described as "angry", she considered it more as "sassy" but agreed that "it's good to get [your feelings] out."

"Fake Friends" is another uptempo number that lyrically, talks about the dismissal of sycophants. It begins with a "heavenly perfect guitar part" and melody-driven verses, transitioning into a chorus accompanied by drums and synthesizers. Sigrid revealed that the song is not based on a personal experience, adding that the title "sounded really good, so I wanted to use it." The EP closes with "Dynamite" (Acoustic), a sweeping, lush and vulnerable acoustic pop ballad whose instrumentation and vocals were compared to Adele's song "Hometown Glory". She has described it as a powerful and personal song for her, it describes the struggles of balancing work and love.

== Release and promotion ==
Don't Kill My Vibe was initially scheduled for release on 3 April 2017, however, it was later pushed back to a month later. It was released digitally on 5 May 2017. The 12-inch vinyl edition of the record was released in Scandinavia the same day. A limited vinyl edition was released on 24 April 2018 at the Rough Trade shops in celebration of the Record Store Day. The cover artwork is similar to the one used for the title track. Sigrid appears wearing a white t-shirt with the record's title and red jeans, while gazing to the viewer with a "have a go if you think you're hard enough" stare.

To promote the EP, Sigrid did several live performances. She performed at the 2017 Nobel Peace Prize Concert, and festivals like SXSW, The Great Escape Festival, Roskilde Festival, Glastonbury Festival, Latitude Festival, Iceland Airwaves, and Øyafestivalen. She also appeared at several television shows, including the Later... with Jools Holland, The Graham Norton Show and The Late Late Show with James Corden.

=== Singles ===
"Don't Kill My Vibe", the EP's title track, was released as the lead single from the EP on 10 February 2017. The song premiered and became BBC Radio 1's Hottest Record in the World that day. A music video directed by J.A.C.K. was released on 31 March 2017, which shows Sigrid dancing along a series of backdrops in a beach located in Los Angeles. An acoustic single with two different versions of the song was released on 21 April 2017. A remixes single was released the same day of the EP, including remixes by Gryffin, Jack Garratt and Cedric Gervais. Commercially, it reached number 28 in Norway, as well as the top twenty in Scotland.

"Plot Twist" was released as the second single from the EP on 14 July 2017. Its "home-recording-styled" music video was filmed in Bergen by Sigurd Fossen and William Glandberger and released on 7 July 2017. A remixes single was released on 21 July 2017, and features a remix by Disciples and an acoustic version of the song. The song only charted in Belgium, reaching number 44 on the Ultratip chart. "Dynamite" (Acoustic) was released as a promotional single on 28 April 2017 with a music video released in 4 May 2017.

== Reception ==
=== Critical reception ===
Professional ratings
Review scores
Source	Rating
The Edge	4/5 stars
The Line of Best Fit	8.5/10

Jason Lipshutz, writing for Billboard, summarised the EP as "13 minutes of spectacular songwriting, four songs full of immediately charming hooks that wind their way toward bigger, more perfect choruses". James Barker of The Edge praised Sigrid's vocal performance and concluded that "there's little to criticise on Don't Kill My Vibe other than its pitiful length, but hopefully the Norwegian star-in-the-making will be back very soon with more gifts for her big pop breakthrough." Abigail Hyland from The Line of Best Fit applauded its feminist lyricism, especially with the title track, which she felt that gave "female listeners [...] an anthem to get riled up on and effect change in their own lives."

=== Commercial performance ===
Commercially, Don't Kill My Vibe spent one week on the Billboard Heatseekers Albums chart, peaking at number 19 in June 2017. Even though the EP had a weak performance, it has been viewed as one of the biggest breakthroughs of 2017. Zara Hedderman, writing in a review of Sucker Punch for The Irish Times, opined that the EP's popularity made "Sigrid [emerge] as a relatively unknown singer, outside of her native Norway, to become the name dropped into conversations with music-savvy friends, as though she was your discovery." In January 2018, almost ten months after the release of the EP, Sigrid became the winner of BBC's Sound of 2018.

== Track listing ==
Don't Kill My Vibe track listing
No.	Title	Writer(s)	Producer(s)	Length
1.	"Don't Kill My Vibe"	Sigrid Raabe; Martin Sjølie	Sjølie	3:04
2.	"Plot Twist"	Raabe; George Flint; Henry Flint	G. Flint; H. Flint	3:25
3.	"Fake Friends"	Raabe; Sjølie	Sjølie	3:21
4.	"Dynamite" (acoustic)	Raabe; Askjell Solstrand	Solstrand	3:51
Total length:				13:41

=== Notes ===
- "Dynamite" (acoustic) was later simply titled "Dynamite" on Sucker Punch.

== Charts ==
Chart performance for Don't Kill My Vibe
Chart (2017)	Peak position
US Heatseekers Albums (Billboard)	19

== Release history ==
Release dates and formats for Don't Kill My Vibe
Region	Date	Format	Label	Ref.
Various	5 May 2017	Digital download; streaming; vinyl	Island; Petroleum	
Various	24 April 2018	Vinyl	Island	
