= Arvid Solvang =

Norwegian musician

Arvid Wam Solvang (born July 14, 1969) is a Norwegian songwriter/producer living in Oslo, Norway.

== Biography ==
Arvid Wam Solvang was born July 14, 1969, in Kopervik, Norway. After touring Norway for years as a guitarist with a range of different bands, he started a music production company called Viagram. Solvang is known for his work with Maria Mena where he has co-written most of her songs, and produced her first three albums. He has also co-written and produced the first albums for Norwegian artist Christel Alsos.

Solvang is signed to EMI music publishing. He is currently a board member at The Norwegian Society of Composers and Lyricists (NOPA), and he is in the election committee for The organization for Norwegian artists and professional musicians (GRAMART).

== Discography ==
- 2002 Maria Mena - Another Phase
- 2004 Maria Mena - Mellow
- 2004 Maria Mena - White Turns Blue
- 2004 Kristian Valen - Listen When Alone
- 2005 Maria Mena - Apparently Unaffected
- 2005 Vidar Johnsen - Dance of Lust
- 2007 Christel Alsos - Closing the Distance
- 2007 Vidar Johnsen og Peter Nordberg - Ord och ögonblick
- 2008 Vidar Johnsen og Peter Nordberg - Mål & Mening
- 2009 Vidar Johnsen og Peter Nordberg - I Ild Og Vatten
- 2010 Christel Alsos - Tomorrow is
- 2012 Vidar Johnsen - Galskapens land
