= Mellow (Maria Mena album) =

Studio album by Maria Mena
- Released: March 1, 2004
- Recorded: 2003–2004
- Genre: Pop
- Length: 40:26
- Label: Sony Music, Columbia

Maria Mena chronology
Another Phase (2002)	Mellow (2004)	White Turns Blue (2004)

Mellow is the second album by Maria Mena. Released in Norway as a counterpart to her US album White Turns Blue, it was accompanied by the single "You're the Only One". The album was produced by Arvid Solvang.

== Track listing ==
Studio Album
No.	Title	Length
1.	"What's Another Day"	2:54
2.	"Just a Little Bit"	3:57
3.	"You're the Only One"	2:45
4.	"Come in Over Me"	1:45
5.	"Patience"	3:49
6.	"Take You with Me"	2:59
7.	"Shadow"	3:39
8.	"Lose Control"	2:38
9.	"So Sweet (Featuring Thomas Dybdahl)"	4:46
10.	"Your Glasses"	4:00
11.	"Sorry"	2:54
12.	"A Few Small Bruises"	3:57

Due to the other three singles of the album, "Just A Little Bit", "Take You With Me" and "Patience" failing to chart, "So Sweet" was not released as a single, despite the sticker on the front of the CD advertising it as one.

== Charts ==
Chart performance for Mellow
Chart (2004)	Peak position
Norwegian Albums (VG-lista)	7

== Certifications ==
Region	Certification	Certified units/sales
Norway (IFPI Norway)	Gold	20,000^{*}
^{*} Sales figures based on certification alone.
