= Thirumbi Paar =

Thirumbi Paar (lit. 'Look Back') may refer to these Indian films:

- Thirumbi Paar (1953 film), a Tamil language film
- Thirumbi Paar (1996 film), a Tamil comedy-drama film

== See also ==
- Look Back (disambiguation)
