= Di Første Jul =

Studio album by Tone Damli
- Released: 17 November 2014
- Genre: Pop; Christmas
- Label: Eccentric Music
- Producer: David Eriksen

Tone Damli chronology
Heartkill (2014)	Di Første Jul (2014)

Singles from Di Første Jul
- 1. "Di Første Jul" Released: 6 November 2014

Di Første Jul is Norwegian singer Tone Damli's fifth studio album. The album was released on 17 November 2014. The album peaked at number 9 on the Norwegian Albums Chart, becoming her third top ten album.

== Background ==
Di Første Jul is Damli's first Christmas album, and first singing in her native Norwegian. All songs are ballads here, aside from the festive barn dance anthem "Vinder og Snø’".

== Track listing ==
1. "Når Himmelen Dette Ned" - 3:55
2. "Luciasang" - 3:50
3. "Di Første Jul" - 3:44
4. "Jul, Jul, Strålande Jul" - 3:44
5. "Jon Blund" - 2:04
6. "Snø" - 3:58
7. "Mitt Hjerte Alltid Vanker" - 3:32
8. "Vinter Og Snø" - 2:52
9. "Vi Tenner Våre Lykter" - 3:30
10. "Fager Er Jordi" - 2:39

== Charts ==
Chart (2014/15)	Peak position
Norwegian Albums Chart	9

== Release history ==
Country	Date	Format	Label
Worldwide	17 November 2014	CD single, digital download	Eccentric Music
