= Looking Back =

Looking Back may refer to:

== Books ==
- Looking Back (book), an autobiography by Lois Lowry
- Looking Back, a book by Ambeth Ocampo

== Music ==
- Looking Back (Tone Damli album) (2012)
- Looking Back (John Mayall album), or its title song
- Lookin' Back (Hank Locklin album), (1969)
- Looking Back (Leon Russell album) (1973)
- Looking Back (Toyah album) (1995)
- Looking Back (Stevie Wonder album) (1977)
- Looking Back (The Cherry Slush album)
- Lookin' Back, a 2009 album by Bob Baldwin
- Looking Back, an album by Cinderella
- Lookin' Back, an album by The 4 Seasons
- Lookin' Back, an album by Ken Medema
- Looking Back – The Best of Daryl Hall + John Oates (Daryl Hall and John Oates album) (1991)

=== Songs ===
- "Looking Back" (Nat King Cole song), 1958
- "Looking Back" (Aksel Kankaanranta song), 2020
- "Looking Back", a 1969 Ruth Brown song on the My Blueberry Nights soundrack
- "Lookin' Back", a 1971 song by Bob Seger
- "Lookin' Back", a 1981 song by Rich Dodson
- "Lookin' Back", a song by E-40 from Revenue Retrievin': Overtime Shift

== See also ==
- Lebensrückblick (Looking Back), a 1951 autobiography by Lou Andreas-Salomé
- "Looking Back to See", a 1954 song by The Browns
