= Cocool =

Studio album by Tone Damli
- Released: 18 October 2010
- Recorded: 2010
- Genre: Pop
- Label: Eccentric Music
- Producer: David Eriksen

Tone Damli chronology
I Know (2009)	Cocool (2010)	Looking Back (2012)

Cocool is the fourth studio album by Norwegian singer Tone Damli, which was released on 18 October 2010. The album peaked at number 22 on the Norwegian Albums Chart.

== Track listing ==
No.	Title	Writer(s)	Producer	Length
1.	"Slightly Bitter Taste"	David Eriksen, Hanne Sørvaag, Tone Damli Aaberge	David Eriksen	3:55
2.	"No Way Out"	Arnthor Birgisson, D. Eriksen, Negin Djafari	D. Eriksen	4:06
3.	"Crazy Cool"	D. Eriksen, Simone Larsen, T. Aaberge	D. Eriksen	3:20
4.	"Can't Face Losing You"	Ben Adams, D. Eriksen, T. Aaberge	D. Eriksen	3:43
5.	"Stuck In My Head"	D. Eriksen, Mats Lie Skåre, T. Aaberge, Øyvind "Vinni" Sauvik	D. Eriksen	3:19
6.	"I Love You"	D. Eriksen, Ina Wroldsen	D. Eriksen	3:39
7.	"That's What You Get"	Ben Adams, D. Eriksen, T. Aaberge	D. Eriksen	3:55
8.	"Stupid"	Christian Ingebrigtsen, D. Eriksen, Michael Hunter Ochs	D. Eriksen	2:50
9.	"Don't Wake Me"	Andy Marvel, Chloe Temtchine, D. Eriksen	D. Eriksen	3:52
10.	"40 Years"	Ian James, Martin Sjølie, Virginia Balckmore	D. Eriksen	4:18
11.	"Love Me Like You Hate Me"	D. Eriksen, Jacob Erixson, Oscar Holter, T. Aaberge	D. Eriksen	3:57

iTunes bonus
No.	Title	Producer	Length
12.	"Pick It Up"	D. Eriksen	3:44

== Charts ==
Chart (2010)	Peak position
Norwegian Albums Chart	22

== Release history ==
Country	Date	Format	Label
Norway	18 October 2010	CD single, digital download	Eccentric Music
