= Don't Kill My Vibe =

Single by Sigrid

from the EP Don't Kill My Vibe and the album Sucker Punch
- Released: 10 February 2017
- Recorded: 2016
- Genre: Pop
- Length: 3:04
- Label: Island; Universal
- Songwriter(s): Sigrid Raabe; Martin Sjølie
- Producer(s): Martin Sjølie

Sigrid singles chronology
| "Don't Kill My Vibe" (2017) | "Plot Twist" (2017) |

Music video
- "Don't Kill My Vibe" on YouTube

"Don't Kill My Vibe" is the debut single by Norwegian singer and songwriter Sigrid, released on 10 February 2017 through Island Records and Universal Music Group. The song was written by Sigrid alongside Martin Sjølie, and is included on both the singer's debut EP of the same name and her debut album, Sucker Punch, serving as the lead single from each project.

== Background ==
In an interview with NME's Thomas Smith, Sigrid said:

"When we wrote 'Don't Kill My Vibe', Martin Sjølie asked me what I'd been thinking about, and I started talking about this difficult previous session I'd been in. I could've described this upcoming moment of truth as a bad teenage novel but ok, short version: I almost killed that Mac keyboard due to angry writing."

== Critical reception ==
Thomas Smith of NME stated "Katy Perry may indeed be the big pop comeback of the day—but nestled in just below her on several New Music Friday playlists across the land is an equally massive hit—and maybe even a better pop banger—from newcomer Sigrid. 'Don't Kill My Vibe' is the first single from new Island signee and it is, put simply, a belter. The 20-year-old Norwegian's entrance is a clapback at all the naysayers and under-estimators with soft, building piano and scattered beats eventually submitting to her majestic chorus." Pigeons and Planes's Jacob Moore called it "an anthemic piece of pop that showcases the young singer's songwriting skills."

== In other media ==
The song was featured in the film The American Meme and the television shows Music City, Life Sentence, Locke and Key, Love Island, The Bold Type, and Tiny Pretty Things. A Simlish version of the song appeared in the video game The Sims 4: Parenthood. A version of the song was performed by the main character Violet Valenski (portrayed by Elle Fanning) in the 2018 film Teen Spirit.

== Track listing ==
Digital download
| No. | Title | Length |
|---|---|---|
| 1. | "Don't Kill My Vibe" | 3:04 |

Digital download
| No. | Title | Length |
|---|---|---|
| 1. | "Don't Kill My Vibe" (Acoustic) | 3:06 |

Digital download
| No. | Title | Length |
|---|---|---|
| 1. | "Don't Kill My Vibe" (Gryffin Remix) | 3:50 |

Digital download
| No. | Title | Length |
|---|---|---|
| 1. | "Don't Kill My Vibe" (John MacBeth Remix) | 2:43 |

== Charts ==
=== Weekly charts ===
Weekly chart performance for "Don't Kill My Vibe"
| Chart (2017) | Peak position |
|---|---|
| Australia (ARIA) | 85 |
| Czech Republic (Rádio – Top 100) | 94 |
| France (SNEP) | 147 |
| New Zealand Heatseekers (RMNZ) | 4 |
| Norway (VG-lista) | 28 |
| Scotland (OCC) | 20 |
| UK Singles (OCC) | 62 |

=== Year-end charts ===
Year-end chart performance for "Don't Kill My Vibe"
| Chart (2017) | Position |
|---|---|
| Iceland (Tónlistinn) | 35 |

== Certifications ==
| Region | Certification | Certified units/sales |
|---|---|---|
| Norway (IFPI Norway) | 2× Platinum | 120,000^{‡} |
| United Kingdom (BPI) | Gold | 400,000^{‡} |
^{‡} Sales+streaming figures based on certification alone.

== Release history ==
| Region | Date | Format | Label | Ref. |
|---|---|---|---|---|
| Worldwide | 10 February 2017 | Digital download | Island; Universal | |
| Worldwide | 3 March 2017 | Digital download (Acoustic) | Island; Universal | |
| Worldwide | 7 April 2017 | Digital download (Gryffin Remix) | Island; Universal | |
| Worldwide | 7 April 2017 | Digital download (John MacBeth Remix) | Island; Universal | |
| United Kingdom | 7 April 2017 | Contemporary hit radio | Island; Universal | |
| United States | 6 June 2017 | Top 40 radio | Island | |
