= All I Know (disambiguation) =

"All I Know" is a 1973 song by Art Garfunkel.

All I Know may also refer to:

- All I Know (EP), by Conrad Sewell, 2015
- "All I Know" (Karnivool song), 2010
- "All I Know" (Matrix & Futurebound song), 2012
- "All I Know" (Screaming Trees song), 1996
- "All I Know" (The Weeknd song), 2016
- "All I Know", a song by Five Finger Death Punch from AfterLife, 2022
- "All I Know", song by Lil' Flip from U Gotta Feel Me, 2004
- "All I Know", a song by Machine Gun Kelly from Tickets to My Downfall, 2020
- "All I Know", a song by Max, 1974
- "All I Know", a song by Moka Only from Desired Effect, 2006
- "All I Know", a single by Rudimental and Khalid from Rudim3ntal, 2025
