= Maria Mena =

Norwegian singer (born 1986)

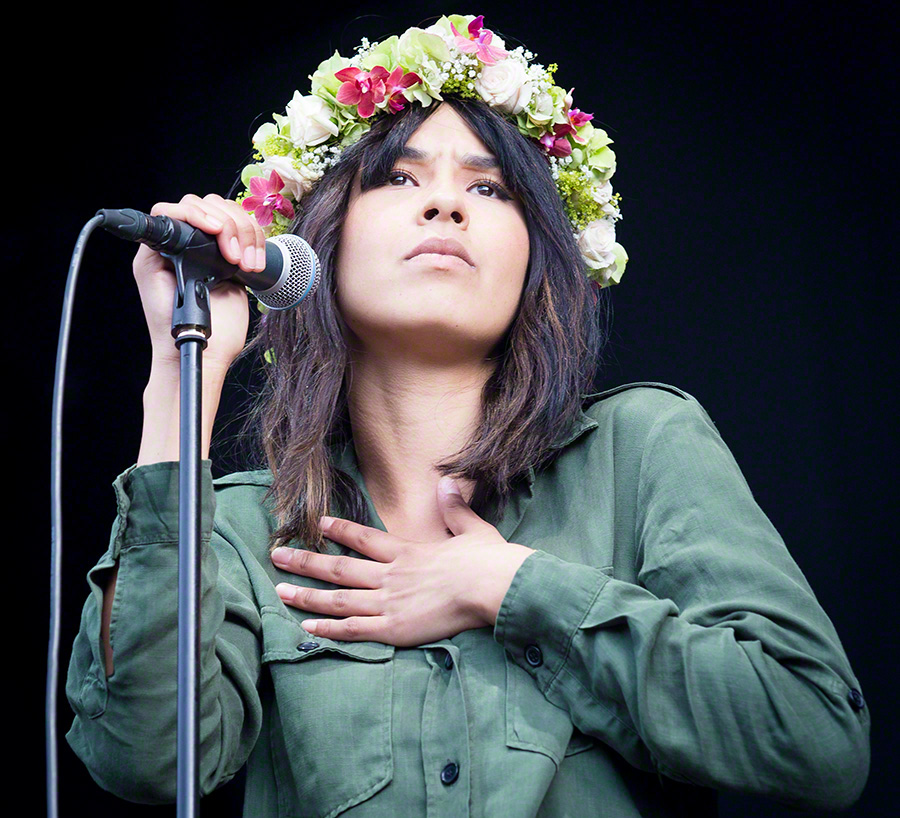
- Maria Mena at stage during Stavernfestivalen in 2016

Background information
- Born: Maria Viktoria Mena; 19 February 1986 (age 40); Oslo, Norway
- Genres: Pop, folk, rock
- Occupation: Singer
- Years active: 2002–present
- Labels: Sony Music Norway, Columbia
- Website: mariamena.no

Maria Viktoria Mena (born 19 February 1986) is a Norwegian pop singer, best known for her singles such as "You're the Only One", "Just Hold Me", and "All This Time" which charted in multiple countries.

== Early life ==
Maria Viktoria Mena was born to a Norwegian mother and Charles Mena, a Nicaraguan-American drummer of Afro-Nicaraguan descent. There was a common misconception that her mother is a playwright, but Mena debunked this in an interview. Both Maria and her brother, Tony, are named after characters from Leonard Bernstein's West Side Story.

Her father was born in Bluefields, Nicaragua where he lived until he was 10, at which point he and his mother, Mena's paternal grandmother, moved to New York. After moving to Norway in 1986, he played in several bands in Oslo, which influenced Mena to write and record her own music. When Mena was nine years old, her parents divorced. As a teenager, she began to battle depression and various eating disorders such as anorexia nervosa and bulimia nervosa, as spoken of in her lyrics, interviews, concerts, and social media. Mena has spoken of battling depression and PTSD as an adult, and seeking help.

Mena cared for her younger brother Tony for many years. When Mena was 13 years old, she moved to live with her father. She sang and wrote lyrics as a form of self-soothing. "My Lullaby", a song from Mena's diary, expresses her pain from her parents' divorce. Mena's father contacted acquaintances in the music industry to record a demo. Presenting his daughter's demo to several record companies, Sony Music signed Mena to their label aged 16.

== Career ==
=== 2002–2007: Early beginnings ===
In 2002, she released her debut single "Fragile (Free)" in Norway; however, it did not chart there. "My Lullaby" was released as the second single and the song reached number 5 on the Norwegian Singles Chart. It received heavy rotation on NRK P1, P3, P4, Radio 1, and Radio Oslo. The young singer quickly gained fans and soon earned her first platinum record. After the success of "My Lullaby", she released her debut album, Another Phase, in Norway which reached number 6 on the Norwegian Albums Chart. Mena made an appearance on the Late Show with David Letterman to promote her first international album, White Turns Blue, which debuted at the top position on the Billboard Top Heatseekers chart a week later and at number 102 on the Billboard 200. She made a breakthrough into the worldwide singles charts that year with "You're the Only One", a single successful in multiple countries. The song was her only single to appear on a Billboard chart, making No. 25 on the U.S. Top 40 Mainstream. "You're the Only One" peaked at No. 30 on the Dutch Top 40 and No. 19 on the Dutch Mega Single Top 100. Two months earlier, in March 2004, Mena had released her second album in Norway. Mellow. Less successful than her 2002 debut, it still managed to peak at No. 7 in Norway. The second single from both albums was "Just a Little Bit", which did not chart anywhere.

2005 saw the release of Apparently Unaffected in Norway and several other European countries, fronted by singles "Miss You Love" and "Just Hold Me". A significant success in Norway, the album has earned her three Spellemann nominations: Best Female Artist, Best Hit, and Best Music Video. In the Netherlands, the album was released in June 2006 and charted at No. 82. It slowly climbed the chart to reach its peak position in its 27th week at No. 11, as "Just Hold Me" was getting airplay again. "Just Hold Me" was released in May 2006, but then did not chart in the official Dutch Top 40, but did chart in the country's physical singles chart, the Mega Single Top 100, at No. 27. In October 2006, the song started getting heavy airplay again and this time it reached the official Dutch Top 40 and peaked at No. 26. In the Mega Single Top 100, it peaked at No. 7 in the beginning of November 2006. Mena performed at sold-out concerts in Utrecht and Amsterdam, following the success of "Just Hold Me". The album was at No. 48 at the Dutch year-end chart, outselling major artists such as Pink's I'm Not Dead, Nelly Furtado's Loose, and Beyoncé Knowles' B'Day. "Miss You Love" was released as the album's second single in the Netherlands and reached No. 61 on the Mega Singles Top 100.

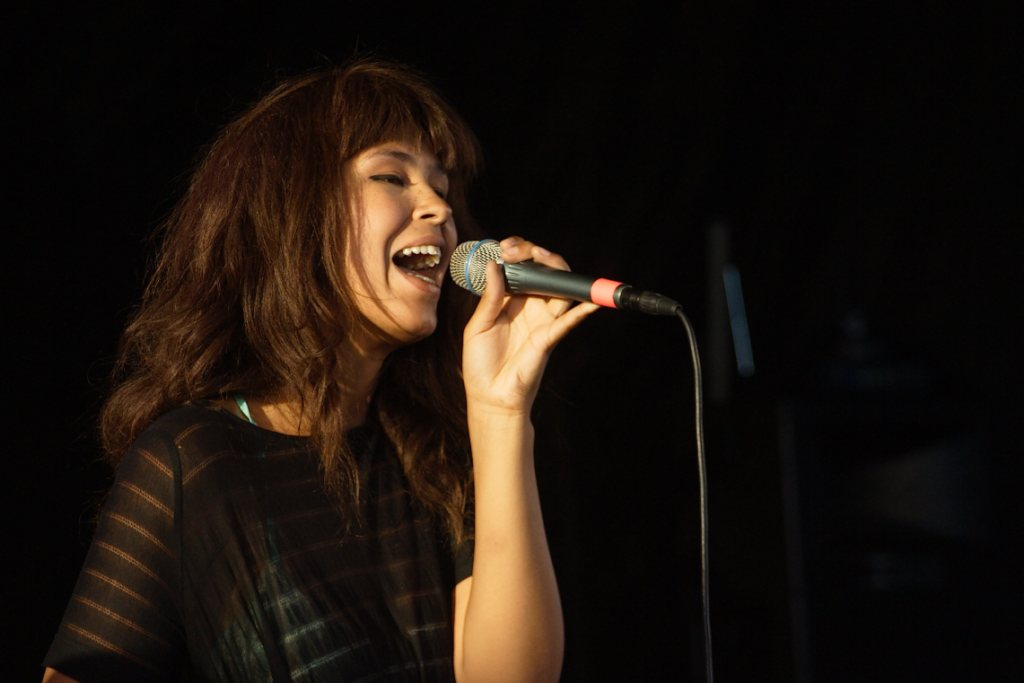
Maria Mena 2008

On 7 July 2007, she performed at the German leg of Live Earth in Hamburg.

=== 2008–2014: Cause and Effect, Viktoria, and Weapon in Mind ===
Having worked on her three first studio albums with Norwegian producer Arvid Solvang, Mena started collaborating with Martin Sjølie in early 2008 on what would become her fourth studio album, Cause and Effect. The album's first single, "Belly Up" had its radio premiere mid-June 2008 on Norwegian radio. Cause and Effect was released on 17 September in Norway. The first international single was "All This Time". The album was internationally released on 26 September 2008. This album garnered her a Spellemann for Best Female Artist.

Mena's song "Sorry" was featured on the third season of US So You Think You Can Dance and "What's Another Day" was featured during the fourth season. She released "All This Time" in the UK on 11 April 2010.

In 2011 Mena recorded her version of "Mitt lille land" (My Little Country) by Ole Paus as part of a project by the Norwegian TV channel TV2. On 23 July, the day after the Norway terrorist attacks and after requests from her Norwegian audience, Mena uploaded her version of the song to the streaming site SoundCloud. It quickly became an anthem in memory of the victims of the attacks. She contributed to the album Mitt lille land, performing one of two versions of the title track (the other was performed by Ole Paus). As of 2011 Mena had sold a total of 700,000 copies of her albums, and half of those copies had been sold in Norway.

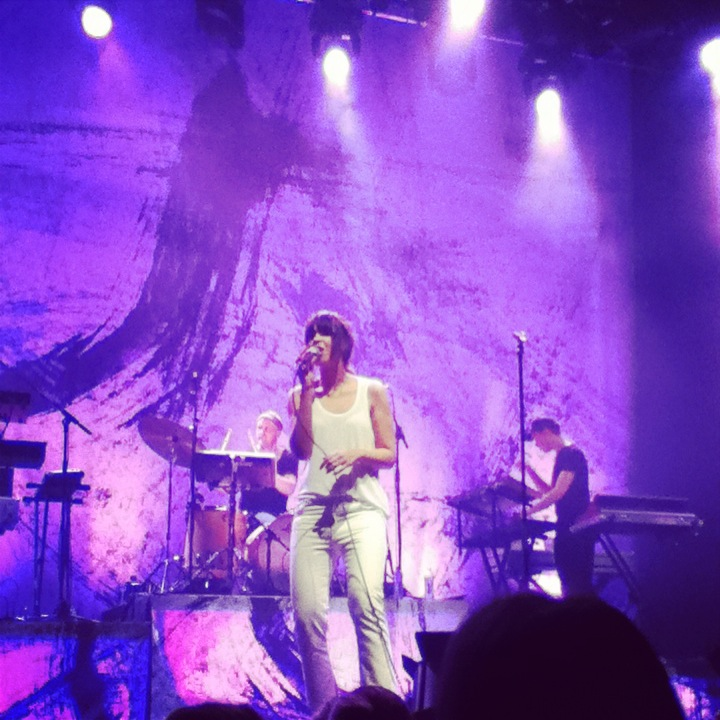
Maria Mena performing in 013 Tilburg, 10 February 2014 in The Netherlands during her Weapon in Mind Tour

Her fifth studio album, Viktoria, was released on 23 September 2011 and was produced by Martin Sjølie.

Her sixth album, Weapon in Mind, was released in 2013, becoming her first album to reach number one in Norway. Even though all three singles of the album failed to chart inside top 20 Norway Singles Chart, "Fuck You" and "I Always Liked That" became two of her best selling singles in Norway, both certified 2× Platinum.

=== 2015–present: Growing Pains and They Never Leave Their Wives ===
Mena released the single "I Don't Wanna See You with Her" on 6 November 2015. Her seventh studio album, Growing Pains, was released on 4 December 2015.

In March 2020, Mena announced a new album (sometimes recognized as an EP), They Never Leave Their Wives. The album was released on 23 October 2020. Mena released three singles from the album, "Not OK", "Lies (They Never Leave Their Wives)", and "You Live and You Learn".

In October 2020, Mena announced that she will release a new album in March 2021. In April 2021 Mena made a new announcement, saying she will postpone the release of her new material until she can play concerts again. The concert venues in Norway have been closed for longer periods during the COVID-19 pandemic. She described the upcoming album as a sequel to They Never Leave Their Wives, containing songs about a woman who is on her own and then finds love.

In August 2022, Mena was cast in the second season of the Viaplay series Furia. Mena also auditioned for a role in the Norwegian TV series Etterglød (Afterglow), where she was not cast but offered to make a song for the soundtrack. That song is "It Was Love", which was released on 23 September 2022.

== Discography ==
=== Studio albums ===
Title	Album details	Chart positions						Certifications
Title	Album details	NOR	AUT	GER	NL	POL	SWI	Certifications
Another Phase	1st studio album; Released: 22 April 2002	6	—	—	—	—	—	IFPI NOR: Platinum
Mellow	2nd studio album; Released: 1 March 2004	7	—	—	—	—	—	IFPI NOR: Gold
Apparently Unaffected	3rd studio album; Released: 14 November 2005	6	40	22	11	—	56	BVMI: Gold; NVPI: Platinum
Cause and Effect	4th studio album; Released: 15 September 2008	4	23	20	8	43	13	IFPI NOR: Platinum; BVMI: Gold; IFPI SWI: Gold; NVPI: Gold
Viktoria	5th studio album; Released: 23 September 2011	2	29	18	17	—	13	IFPI NOR: Gold
Weapon in Mind	6th studio album; Released: 23 September 2013	1	—	59	14	—	30	
Growing Pains	7th studio album; Released: 4 December 2015	6	—	—	31	—	75	
And Then Came You	8th studio album; Released: 15 September 2023	5	—	—	—	—	—	

=== Compilation albums ===
Title	Album details	Chart positions
Title	Album details	US
White Turns Blue	International debut album; Released: 20 July 2004	102

=== EPs ===
Title	EP details	Chart positions
Title	EP details	NOR
They Never Leave Their Wives	Released: 23 October 2020	12

=== Singles ===
==== As lead artist ====
Year	Title	Chart positions										Certification	Album
Year	Title	NOR	AUT	EU	GER	NL 40	NL 100	NZ	SWI	UK	US	Certification	Album
2002	"Fragile (Free)"	—	—	—	—	—	—	—	—	—	—		Another Phase & White Turns Blue
2002	"My Lullaby"	5	—	—	—	—	—	—	—	—	—	IFPI NOR: Gold	Another Phase & White Turns Blue
2004	"You're the Only One"	8	—	43	—	30	19	35	—	—	86		Mellow & White Turns Blue
2004	"Just a Little Bit"	—	—	—	—	—	—	—	—	—	—		Mellow & White Turns Blue
2006	"Miss You Love"	—	—	—	—	—	—	—	—	—	—		Apparently Unaffected
2006	"Just Hold Me"	2	4	52	14	26	7	—	5	158	—	IFPI SWI: Gold; BVMI: Gold	Apparently Unaffected
2006	"Miss You Love" (re-release) ^{1}	—	—	147	73	—	61	—	—	—	—		Apparently Unaffected
2006	"Our Battles"	—	—	—	—	—	—	—	81	—	—		Apparently Unaffected
2008	"Nevermind Me" ^{2}	—	—	—	84	—	76	—	—	—	—		Apparently Unaffected
2008	"Belly Up" ^{3}	4	—	75	—	—	—	—	—	—	—		Cause and Effect
2008	"All This Time"	7	7	13	15	6	7	—	14	—	—	BVMI: Gold; IFPI SWI: Gold	Cause and Effect
2009	"I'm in Love"	—	—	—	—	—	54	—	—	—	—		Cause and Effect
2009	"I Was Made for Lovin' You"	—	44	—	91	—	—	—	20	—	—		Cause and Effect
2010	"Home for Christmas"	1	—	56	—	—	98	—	—	—	—	IFPI NOR: 5× Platinum	Hjem Til Jul soundtrack
2011	"This Too Shall Pass"	—	—	—	—	—	—	—	—	—	—		Viktoria
2011	"Homeless"	—	—	—	—	—	69	—	65	—	—		Viktoria
2012	"Viktoria"	—	—	—	—	—	—	—	—	—	—		Viktoria
2013	"Fuck You"	— (Note: "Fuck You" did not enter the VG-lista Singles Chart, but peaked at number 6 on the Norway Digital Song Sales chart.)	—	—	—	—	—	—	—	—	—	IFPI NOR: 2× Platinum	Weapon in Mind
2013	"I Always Liked That"	— (Note: "I Always Liked That" did not enter the VG-lista Singles Chart, but peaked at number 9 on the Norway Digital Song Sales chart.)	—	188	—	—	100	—	—	—	—	IFPI NOR: 2× Platinum	Weapon in Mind
2014	"Til Alle Tider"	— (Note: "Til Alle Tider" did not enter the VG-lista Singles Chart, but peaked at number 9 on the Norway Digital Song Sales chart.)	—	—	—	—	—	—	—	—	—		Bauta – En hyllest til Bjørn Eidsvåg
2015	"I Don't Wanna See You with Her"	20	—	—	—	—	—	—	—	—	—	IFPI NOR: 2× Platinum	Growing Pains
2016	"Leaving You"	—	—	—	—	—	—	—	—	—	—		Growing Pains
2020	"Not OK"	37	—	—	—	—	—	—	—	—	—	IFPI NOR: Gold	They Never Leave Their Wives
2020	"Lies (They Never Leave Their Wives)"	—	—	—	—	—	—	—	—	—	—		They Never Leave Their Wives
2020	"You Live and You Learn"	—	—	—	—	—	—	—	—	—	—		They Never Leave Their Wives
2020	"Jula Hjemme" (featuring Trygve Skaug)	16	—	—	—	—	—	—	—	—	—		Non-album single
2021	"I Need a Man" (Hver gang vi møtes)	2	—	—	—	—	—	—	—	—	—	IFPI NOR: Platinum	Stian Staysmans dag (Sesong 11)
2021	"Ghettoparasitt" (Hver gang vi møtes)	5	—	—	—	—	—	—	—	—	—		Hkeems dag (Sesong 11)
2021	"Stein på stein" (Hver gang vi møtes)	—	—	—	—	—	—	—	—	—	—		Arne Hurlens dag (Sesong 11)
2021	"Goin' Insane" (Hver gang vi møtes)	—	—	—	—	—	—	—	—	—	—		Agnete Sabas dag (Sesong 11)
2021	"Når en skumring blir blå" (Hver gang vi møtes)	—	—	—	—	—	—	—	—	—	—		Hanne Kroghs dag (Sesong 11)
2021	"Det går over" (Hver gang vi møtes)	—	—	—	—	—	—	—	—	—	—		Trygve Skaugs dag (Sesong 11)
2021	"Speil"	—	—	—	—	—	—	—	—	—	—		Non-album single
2022	"It Was Love"	—	—	—	—	—	—	—	—	—	—		TBA
2022	"Alt du vil ha" (with Isah)	2	—	—	—	—	—	—	—	—	—		Non-album single
2023	"Not Worth It"	—	—	—	—	—	—	—	—	—	—		And Then Came You
2023	"Try Again Tomorrow" (featuring Darling West)	—	—	—	—	—	—	—	—	—	—		And Then Came You
2023	"Easy Love"	—	—	—	—	—	—	—	—	—	—		And Then Came You
2023	"Till The Water Runs Clear"	—	—	—	—	—	—	—	—	—	—		And Then Came You

==== As featured artist ====
Year	Title	Chart positions		Album
Year	Title	NOR	GER	Album
2005	"Everytime" (Whimsical featuring Maria Mena)	—	—	The Glow
2009	"Wide Awake" (Sasha featuring Maria Mena)	—	68	Lila, Lila soundtrack
2009	"Konfliktsky" (Jaa9 & OnklP featuring Maria Mena)	—	—	Sellout!
2012	"Fåkke fly bort" (Madcon featuring Maria Mena)	—	—	Contakt
2013	"Colder" (LidoLido featuring Maria Mena and Bun B)	—	—	Battle Poetry
2020	"Narnia" (Aiba featuring Maria Mena)	—	—	TBA
2021	"Den fineste Chevy'n" (Halva Priset featuring Maria Mena)	1	—	TBA

=== Promotional singles ===
Year	Title	Album
2002	"Blame It on Me"	Another Phase
2002	"Sleep to Dream"	Another Phase
2004	"Patience"	Mellow
2011	"Habits" (featuring Mads Langer)^{4}	Viktoria
2011	"A Stranger to Me"	Viktoria
2014	"Til alle tider"	Bauta – En hyllest til Bjørn Eidsvåg
2020	"Mitt Lille Land"	Non-album single
2021	"You Broke Me"	They Never Leave Their Wives
2021	"Ghettoparasitt" (featuring Hkeem and Sisi)	Non-album single

Notes

- ^{1}: The single was officially released in the Netherlands, Germany, Spain and Austria in 2007.
- ^{2}: The single was officially released in the Netherlands in 2009.
- ^{3}: "Belly Up" was only released in Norway.
- ^{4}: "Habits" was only released in the Netherlands.

== Awards and nominations ==
As of 2013, Maria Mena had had 11 Spellemannprisen (Norwegian Grammy) nominations, and won one for Best Female Artist in 2008.

Year	Award	Nominated work	Category	Result
2002	Spellemannprisen	Another Phase	Best Pop Solo	Nominated
2002	Spellemannprisen	Another Phase	Best Newcomer	Nominated
2002	Spellemannprisen	"My Lullaby"	Best Song	Nominated
2004	MTV Europe Music Awards	Herself	Best Nordic Act	Nominated
2005	Spellemannprisen	"Miss You Love"	Best Music Video	Nominated
2005	Spellemannprisen	"Miss You Love"	Best Hit	Nominated
2005	Spellemannprisen	Apparently Unaffected	Best Female Artist	Nominated
2007	SWR3 Awards	Herself	Best New Pop Act	Won
2008	Radio Regenbogen Awards	Herself	Best International Newcomer	Won
2008	Echo Awards	Apparently Unaffected	Best International Newcomer	Nominated
2008	Spellemannprisen	Cause and Effect	Best Female Artist	Won
2008	Spellemannprisen	"All This Time"	Best Music Video	Nominated
2008	Spellemannprisen	"All This Time"	Best Music Video Direction ^{1}	Nominated
2009	MTV Europe Music Awards	Herself	Best Norwegian Act	Nominated
2009	Norwegian Music Critics Award	Herself	Best Female Artist	Won
2009	Echo Awards	Cause and Effect	Best International Rock/Pop Female Artist	Nominated
2010	Spellemannprisen	"Home For Christmas"	Best Hit	Nominated
2011	Spellemannprisen	Viktoria	Best Lyricist	Nominated
2012	Edvard Prize^{2}	Herself	Pop Category	Won
2013	MTV Europe Music Awards	Herself	Best Norwegian Act	Nominated
2013	Spellemannprisen	Weapon in Mind	Best Pop Solo	Nominated
2014	Costume Awards	Herself	Instagrammer of the Year	Nominated
2014	Costume Awards	Herself	Best Dressed Woman	Nominated
2015	Norsk Artistforbund's Honorary Award	Herself	Pop Category	Won

Notes

- ^{1}: Nomination goes to director of the music video Alex Herron.
- ^{2}: Special award given by TONO, copyright organisation for musicians and composers in Norway.

== Footnotes ==
Awards
Preceded by Susanne Sundfør	Recipient of the best Female Pop Solo Artist Spellemannprisen; 2008	Succeeded by Noora Noor
