= White Turns Blue =

Studio album by Maria Mena
- Released: 20 July 2004
- Genre: Pop
- Length: 40:26
- Label: Columbia
- Producer: Arvid Solvang

Maria Mena chronology
Mellow (2004)	White Turns Blue (2004)	Apparently Unaffected (2006)

Professional ratings
Review scores
Source	Rating
Allmusic	3.5/5 stars

White Turns Blue is the international debut album by Norwegian singer-songwriter Maria Mena, released in 2004 in the United States by Columbia Records. It consists of tracks from her first two albums, Another Phase and Mellow, and was specifically compiled for the American market. The album peaked at No. 102 on the Billboard 200 in the United States.

With the exception of "You're the Only One", all tracks are listed as a "US album version", although only the songs taken from Another Phase were re-recorded.

There are several versions of the album. The version released in Norway has the same standard track listing, but with the album art and photos of her previous album Mellow. The US, European, Mexican, Australian, and South African versions have the new artwork. The Indonesian cassette has the Mellow artwork. The Target exclusive edition has two bonus tracks, and a bonus DVD containing the music video to "You're The Only One", and an interview with Mena talking about the making of the album.

== Track listing ==
All songs were written by Maria Mena and Arvid Solvang, except where noted

1. "You're the Only One" – 2:44 (Originally from Mellow)
2. "Fragile (Free)" – 4:00 (Originally from Another Phase)
3. "Just a Little Bit" – 3:56 (Mellow)
4. "Blame It on Me" (Mena, Thomas Whoni) – 3:41 (Another Phase)
5. "My Lullaby" – 2:58 (Another Phase)
6. "Take You with Me" – 3:00 (Mellow)
7. "What's Another Day" – 2:57 (Mellow)
8. "Lose Control" – 2:41(Mellow)
9. "Shadow" (Mena, Whoni) – 3:40 (Mellow)
10. "Your Glasses" – 4:02 (Mellow)
11. "Sorry" – 2:52 (Mellow)
12. "A Few Small Bruises" – 3:55 (Mellow)
13. "You're the Only One" [acoustic][*] – 2:46 (Acoustic version exclusive to Target edition)
14. "Sleep to Dream" [*] – 3:58 (Another Phase)
- [*] bonus track

Bonus DVD:

1. "You're the Only One" (video)
2. Behind the scenes with Maria Mena

== Personnel ==
- Maria Mena – vocals, background vocals
- Jarle Bernhoft – background vocals
- Havard Caspersen – acoustic guitar
- Celsius – keyboard
- Borren Flyen – drums
- Steffen Isaksen – grand piano
- Kjell Harald Litangen – acoustic guitar, baritone guitar
- Elias Muri – background vocals
- Christian Nystrom – keyboard
- Børge Petersen Øverlier – acoustic guitar
- Arvid Solvang – acoustic guitar, piano, electric guitar, keyboard, background vocals, multi instruments, Fender Rhodes
- Vemund Stavnes – bass
- David Wallumrod – Fender Rhodes, Wurlitzer
- Fredrik Wallumrod – drums

== Production ==
- Producer: Arvid Solvang
- Engineer: Arvid Solvang
- Mixing: Andrew Dawson, Ulf Holand, Arvid Solvang
- Mastering: James Cruz
- A&R: Jørgen Bradtlie
- Programming: Celsius, Arvid Solvang, Thomas Whoni
- Sampling: Spectrasoncicsm, Miroslav Vitous
- Arranger: Arvid Solvang
- Art direction: Susanne Cerha
- Design: Susanne Cerha
- Photography: Susanne Cerha
- Hair stylists: Dugg, Viveke Trønsdal
- Stylist: Tommy Løland
- Make-up: Linda Mehrens, Mikas

== Charts ==
Album – Billboard (North America)

Year	Chart	Position
2004	Billboard 200	102
2004	Billboard Top Heatseekers	1

Singles – Billboard (North America)

Year	Single	Chart	Position
2004	"You're the Only One"	Billboard Adult Top 40	31
2004	"You're the Only One"	Billboard Hot 100	86
2004	"You're the Only One"	Billboard Top 40 Mainstream	25
