= Lucy Street =

Swedish pop group

- Origin: Sweden
- Years active: 1999-2001
- Labels: Epic; Sony
- Members: Johanna Lidén, Karolina Dahlman, Malin Sjöquist

Lucy Street was a Swedish pop group that consisted of Johanna Lidén, Karolina Dahlman and Malin Sjöquist, formed in 1999. In 2000, the group scored a hit with their debut single, "Girl Next Door".

Their self-titled debut album was also released that same year by Epic Records, and had two other singles, “Loves Me, Love Me Not” and “2 Minutes Too Late”.

In 2001, the group recorded a version of the song White Horses, originally recorded by Jackie Lee (Irish singer) for the soundtrack of the film Me Without You (film) before they eventually disbanded.

== Discography ==
=== Singles ===
Title	Year	Peak chart positions	Album
Title	Year	SWE	Album
"Girl Next Door"	2000	3	Girl Next Door
