= I Love You (Tone Damli song) =

Single by Tone Damli

from the album Cocool
- Released: 30 April 2010
- Recorded: 2010
- Genre: Pop
- Length: 3:36
- Label: Eccentric Music
- Songwriter(s): D. Eriksen, Ina Wroldsen

Tone Damli singles chronology
"I Know" (2009)	"I Love You" (2010)	"Crazy Cool" (2010)

"I Love You" is a song by Norwegian singer Tone Damli from her fourth studio album Cocool (2010). It was released in Norway on 27 April 2012. The song peaked at number 7 on the Norwegian Singles Chart.

== Track listing ==
Digital download
No.	Title	Length
1.	"I Love You"	3:36

== Chart performance ==
Chart (2010)	Peak position
Norway (VG-lista)	7

== Release history ==
Region	Date	Format	Label
Norway	30 April 2010	Digital download	Eccentric Music
