= Butterflies (Tone Damli song) =

Single by Tone Damli Aaberge

from the album I Know
- Released: 9 January 2009
- Recorded: 2008
- Genre: Pop
- Length: 3:04
- Label: Universal Music
- Songwriter(s): David Eriksen, Billy Burnette, Tone Damli Aaberge, Mats Lie Skåre
- Producer(s): David Eriksen

Tone Damli singles chronology
"Young and Foolish" (2007)	"Butterflies" (2009)	"I Know" (2009)

"Butterflies" is a song by Norwegian singer Tone Damli from her third studio album I Know (2009). It was released in Norway on 9 January 2009. The song peaked at number 2 on the Norwegian Singles Chart. The song was written by David Eriksen, Billy Burnette, Tone Damli Aaberge and Mats Lie Skåre.

== Eurovision Song Contest 2009 ==
She contended in the Norwegian Eurovision Song Contest 2009 finals, with the song and ended up in the runner-up position behind Alexander Rybak who went on to win the contest for Norway.

== Track listing ==
Digital download
No.	Title	Length
1.	"Butterflies"	3:04

== Chart performance ==
Chart (2009)	Peak position
Norway (VG-lista)	2

== Release history ==
Region	Date	Format	Label
Norway	9 January 2009	Digital download	Universal Music
