= I Know (Tone Damli album) =

Studio album by Tone Damli
- Released: 30 March 2009
- Recorded: 2008/09
- Genre: Pop
- Label: Eccentric Music
- Producer: David Eriksen

Tone Damli chronology
Sweet Fever (2007)	I Know (2009)	Cocool (2010)

I Know is Norwegian singer Tone Damli's third studio album, which was released on 30 March 2009. It was produced by David Eriksen. The album peaked at number 3 on the Norwegian Albums Chart.

== Track listing ==
1. "Still" – 3:16
2. "Longshot" – 3:10
3. "I Know" – 3:55
4. "Here I am (You Got Me)" – 3:49
5. "Butterflies" – 3:01
6. "Sooner or Later" – 3:41
7. "Parachute" – 3:54
8. "Then Comes You" – 3:14
9. "Crawl" – 3:42
10. "Lets finish what we started" – 3:09
11. "Little Lies" – 4:00
12. "Butterflies" (Remix) – 3:10

== Charts ==
Chart (2009)	Peak position
Greek Albums Chart	32
Norwegian Albums Chart	3

== Release history ==
Country	Date	Format	Label
Norway	30 March 2009	CD single, digital download	Eccentric Music
