= Look Back (song) =

Single by Tone Damli

from the album Looking Back
- Released: 29 January 2012
- Recorded: 2011
- Genre: Pop
- Length: 3:59
- Label: Eccentric Music
- Songwriters: Tone Damli; Ina Wroldsen; David Eriksen
- Producer: David Eriksen

Tone Damli singles chronology
"Stuck In My Head" (2010)	"Look Back" (2012)	"Imagine" (2012)

"Look Back" is a song by Norwegian singer Tone Damli from her fifth studio album Looking Back (2012). It was released in Norway on 27 April 2012. The song has peaked to number 8 on the Norwegian Singles Chart.

== Music video ==
A music video to accompany the release of "Look Back" was first released onto YouTube on 29 January 2012 at a total length of four minutes and eleven seconds.

== Track listing ==
Album version
No.	Title	Length
1.	"Look Back"	3:59

== Chart performance ==
Chart (2012)	Peak position
Norway (VG-lista)	8
