= Fever (Tone Damli song) =

Single by Tone Damli

from the album Sweet Fever
- Released: 12 March 2007
- Recorded: 2007
- Genre: Pop
- Length: 3:53
- Label: Eccentric Music

Tone Damli singles chronology
"Somewhere Soft to Land" (2006)	"Fever" (2007)	"Young and Foolish" (2007)

"Fever" is a song by Norwegian singer Tone Damli from her third studio album Sweet Fever (2007). It was released in Norway on 12 March 2007. The song peaked at number 6 on the Norwegian Singles Chart.

== Track listing ==
Digital download
No.	Title	Length
1.	"Fever"	3:53

== Chart performance ==
Chart (2007)	Peak position
Norway (VG-lista)	6

== Release history ==
Region	Date	Format	Label
Norway	12 March 2007	Digital download	Eccentric Music
