= Bliss (Tone Damli album) =

Studio album by Tone Damli
- Released: 5 December 2005
- Recorded: 2005
- Genre: Pop
- Label: Eccentric Music
- Producer: Geir Sundstøl

Tone Damli chronology
Bliss (2005)	Sweet Fever (2007)

Bliss is Norwegian singer Tone Damli's first studio album. The album was released on 5 December 2005 and was produced by Geir Sundstøl. The album peaked at number 14 on the Norwegian Albums Chart.

== Track listing ==
1. "The Bliss Song"
2. "End of an Affair"
3. "Keep on Keeping On"
4. "The Moon is a Harsh Mistress" (Jimmy Webb)
5. "Lazy Day in Bed"
6. "Somewhere Soft to Land"
7. "Songbird"
8. "Everything That I Am"
9. "High Hopes"
10. "I´ll Get Myself Together"
11. "Burn for You"
12. "The Bliss Song" (video)

== Charts ==
Chart (2005/06)	Peak position
Norwegian Albums Chart	14

== Release history ==
Country	Date	Format	Label
Norway	5 December 2005	CD single, digital download	Eccentric Music
