= Stuck in My Head =

"Stuck In My Head"

Single by Tone Damli featuring Vinni

from the album Cocool
- Released: 8 April 2011
- Recorded: 2010
- Genre: Pop
- Length: 3:59
- Label: Eccentric Music
- Songwriter(s): D. Eriksen, Mats Lie Skåre, T. Aaberge, Øyvind Sauvik

Tone Damli singles chronology
"Crazy Cool" (2010)	"Stuck In My Head" (2011)	"Look Back" (2012)

"Stuck In My Head" is a song by Norwegian singer Tone Damli from her fourth studio album Cocool (2010), featuring Norwegian rapper Vinni. It was released in Norway on 27 April 2011. The song peaked at number 2 on the Norwegian Singles Chart.

== Music video ==
A music video to accompany the release of "Stuck In My Head" was first released onto YouTube on 29 November 2010 at a total length of three minutes and sixteen seconds.

== Track listing ==
Album version
No.	Title	Length
1.	"Stuck In My Head" (feat. Vinni)	3:24

Digital download
No.	Title	Length
1.	"Stuck In My Head" (Rykkinnfella & Smaaland Remix) (feat. Vinni))	3:33

== Chart performance ==
Chart (2010/11)	Peak position
Norway (VG-lista)	2

== Release history ==
Region	Date	Format	Label
Norway	8 April 2011	Digital download	Eccentric Music
