= Chris Medina =

American singer

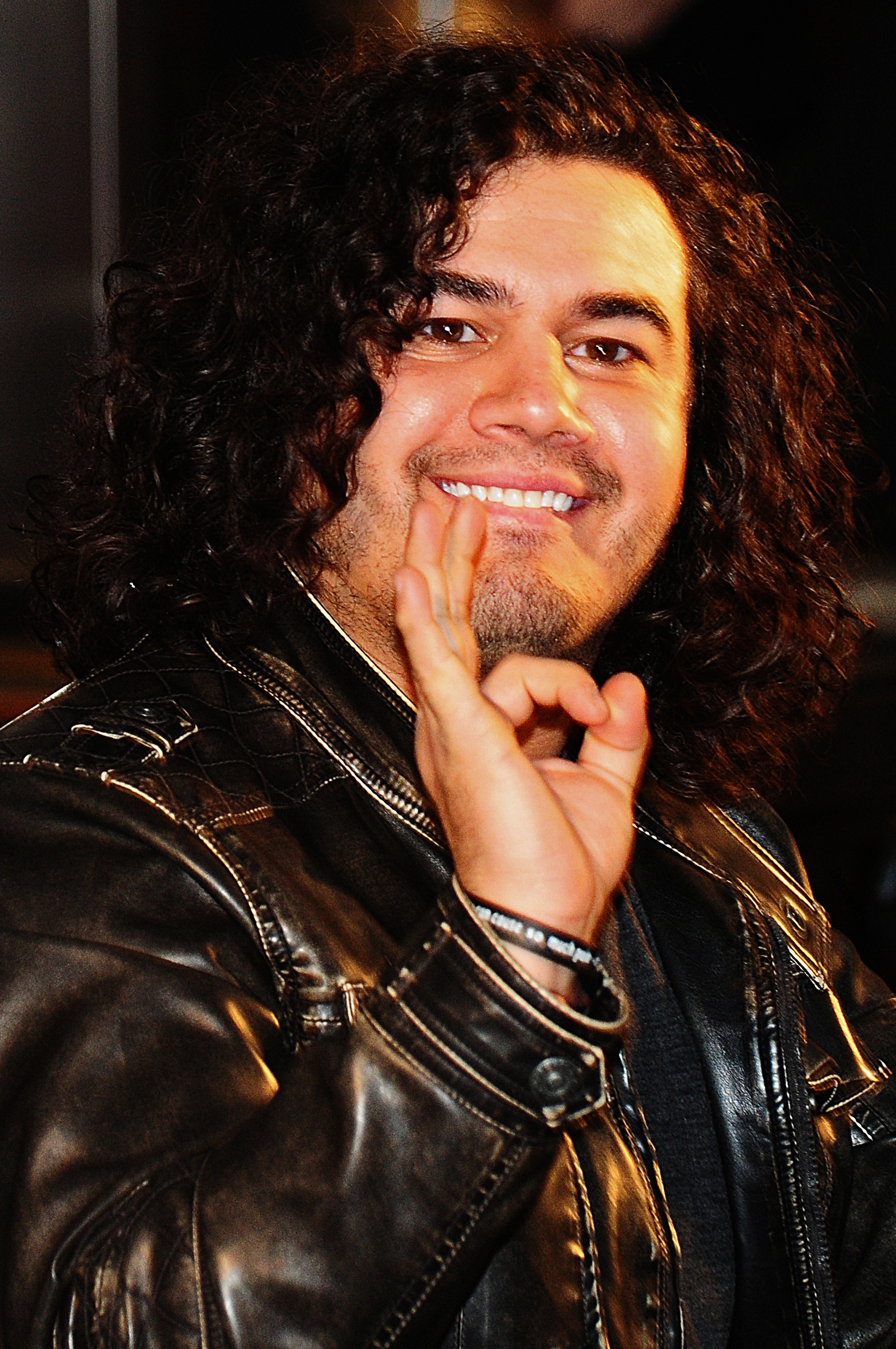
- Chris Medina in Norrköping, Sweden (2011)

Background information
- Born: Christopher Lucas Edward Medina; November 30, 1983 (age 42); Chicago, Illinois, U.S.
- Genres: Pop; rock
- Occupations: Singer; songwriter; guitarist; pianist
- Instruments: Guitar; piano; drums; bass
- Years active: 2011–present

Christopher Edward Medina (born November 30, 1983) is an American-Norwegian singer born in Chicago, Illinois. In late 2010 he auditioned for American Idol making it to the top 40 before being eliminated. He is most famous for his hit "What Are Words", which reached number 1 in Sweden and Norway; it also charted in Denmark and made it to number 83 on Billboard Hot 100.

== Early life ==
Medina grew up in Chicago then relocated to a nearby suburb Oak Forest, Illinois, and graduated from Columbia College Chicago.

== Career ==
=== American Idol ===
In late 2010 he auditioned for the reality show and talent contest "American Idol" and received a "golden ticket to Hollywood", making it to the top 40 out of 327 contestants on Season 10 in 2011. The night he was eliminated on February 24, 2011, Jennifer Lopez, one of the judges, could not control how terrible she felt that she was the one who had to tell him he would not advance further and cried afterwards.

=== 2011–13: What Are Words ===
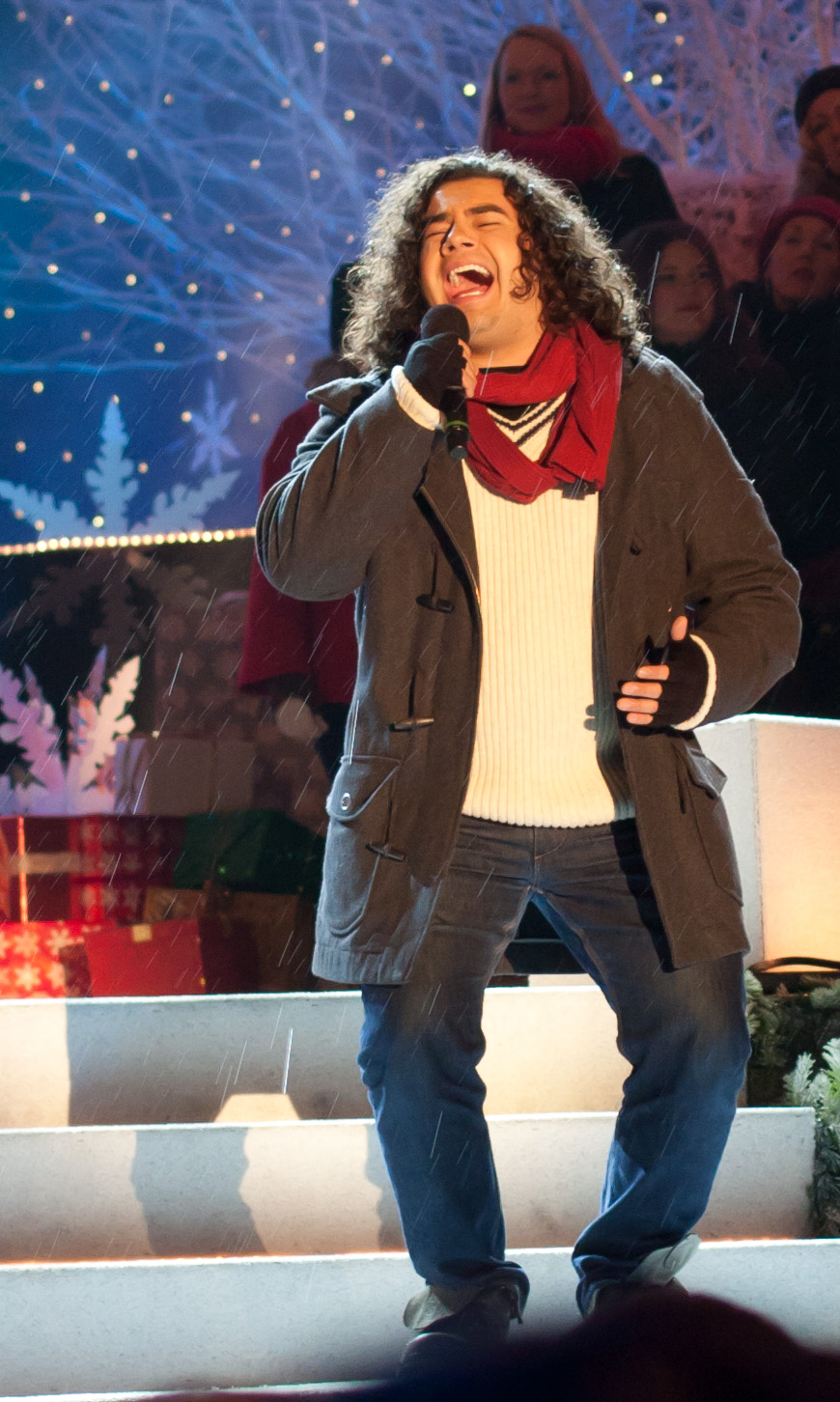
Chris Medina performing in Sweden, 2011

On the day after his elimination, February 25, 2011, "What Are Words," recorded for Simon Fuller's record label 19 Recordings, was released worldwide. Medina stated publicly the song was about his fiancée, Juliana Ramos, who suffered a brain injury two months before they were to be married, and the storyline was heavily used during his American Idol tryout. The song was written by Rodney Jerkins, Andre Lindal and Lauren Christy, and given to Medina to record.

The song debuted at #22 on the Heatseekers Songs chart, and then reached #83 on the Billboard Hot 100. As of 2012 it has since sold 105,000 copies. The single was #1 in Norway for 11 weeks and #1 in Sweden for 8 weeks. He has performed the ballad on The Tonight Show with Jay Leno, Good Morning America, and on Live With Regis and Kelly.

In the summer of 2011, Medina was invited to perform in countries including Norway, Sweden, Denmark, Germany, and Singapore. In Singapore he performed for the "President's Star Charity", which is done to raise money for the physically and mentally challenged. He was able to help raise millions for this charity. Medina sang the song at the funeral of 18-year-old Monica Iselin Didriksen, one of the victims of the Norwegian terror attacks. Didriksen loved that song, and her parents asked him to come and sing at her funeral.

An album was quickly recorded and released on November 28, 2011, also titled "What Are Words", to capitalize on the popularity of the song. The album failed to chart.

To date Medina has not released another single off the album except in Sweden and Norway, where the song "One More Time" charted at Number 16. "Amazed" was released as a third single off the album in Norway only in May 2012.

On March 12, 2013, two years after being cut from American Idol, Medina signed a major motion picture contract with MCS41 (Metropolitan Creative Studio), operated by producer Jim Schramm. The film, that was scheduled for release in fall 2014, was to be based on the story of Medina and Ramos. To date the film has yet to surface.

=== 2013–19 ===
In 2019 Medina was announced as a candidate to represent Norway in the Eurovision Song Contest 2019 in Tel Aviv, Israel. He competed in Melodi Grand Prix, with his song “We Try” alongside 9 other acts.

== Personal life ==
Medina was engaged to Juliana Ramos, who suffered a brain injury two months before they were to be married as the result of a serious car accident on October 2, 2009: Medina has since stated that Ramos had been drinking, texting, and driving erratically. After being together for 13 years, they confirmed their split in 2014, but remain friends.

In 2015, Medina started dating Norwegian Silje Skylstad Gotaas, and on 3 July 2017, Skylstad gave birth to their daughter, Mila. He is currently residing in Oslo, Norway.

== Discography ==
=== Studio albums ===
| Title | Album details | Peak chart positions | |
| Title | Album details | NOR | SWE |
|---|---|---|---|
| What Are Words | Released: 26 November 2011; Label: Eccentric Music; Format: CD, Digital download | 7 | 5 |

=== Extended play ===
| Title | Details |
|---|---|
| Letters to Juliet | Release date: March 5, 2013; Label: Executive Records; Formats: Digital download |

=== Singles ===
| Title | Year | Peak chart positions | | | | Certifications | Album |
| Title | Year | DEN | NOR | SWE | US | Certifications | Album |
|---|---|---|---|---|---|---|---|
| "What Are Words" | 2011 | 19 | 1 | 1 | 83 | NOR: 4× Platinum; SWE: 2× Platinum | What Are Words |
| "One More Time" | 2011 | — | 16 | — | — | | What Are Words |
| "Amazed" | 2012 | — | — | — | — | | What Are Words |
| "My Hopeless" | 2013 | — | — | — | — | | Non-album singles |
| "Make it Home" | 2015 | — | — | — | — | | Non-album singles |
| "Something Kind of Wonderful" | 2015 | — | — | — | — | | Non-album singles |
| "Cut Me" | 2018 | — | — | — (Note: "Cut Me" did not enter the Swedish Singles Chart, but peaked at number 11 on the Swedish Heatseeker chart.) | — | | Non-album singles |
| "We Try" | 2019 | — | — | — | — | | Non-album singles |

Featured in

- 2014: "Here Comes the Flood" (Getty Domein feat Chris Medina)
