= Another Phase =

Studio album by Maria Mena
- Released: 22 April 2002
- Genre: Pop
- Length: 49:38
- Label: Sony Music, Columbia

Maria Mena chronology
Another Phase (2002)	Mellow (2004)

Another Phase is Maria Mena's debut album, which was released by Sony Music Norway. It peaked at number six on the Norwegian Albums Chart. Her two singles "Free" and "My Lullaby" first appeared on this album. The album was co-written and produced by Arvid Solvang.

The original 2002 release was issued in a standard CD jewelcase. The 2009 re-release came in a slider box.

== Track listing ==
Studio Album
No.	Title	Length
1.	"Free"	4:00
2.	"Blame It on Me"	3:26
3.	"My Lullaby"	2:45
4.	"Sleep to Dream"	3:38
5.	"Monday Morning"	4:05
6.	"Pale People"	4:38
7.	"They Smoke a Lot"	1:45
8.	"Crowded Train"	3:50
9.	"Bye Bye"	3:52
10.	"Ugly"	3:36
11.	"Those Who Caved In"	3:55
12.	"Better Than Nothing"	3:40
13.	"When It Rains" (Hidden Track appended to "Better Than Nothing", starts 7:16 into the track, after 3:35 of silence)	2:39

== Charts ==
Chart performance for Another Phase
Chart (2002)	Peak position
Norwegian Albums (VG-lista)	6

== Certifications ==
Region	Certification	Certified units/sales
Norway (IFPI Norway)	Platinum	50,000^{*}
^{*} Sales figures based on certification alone.
