= Tone Damli =

Norwegian singer-songwriter and actress

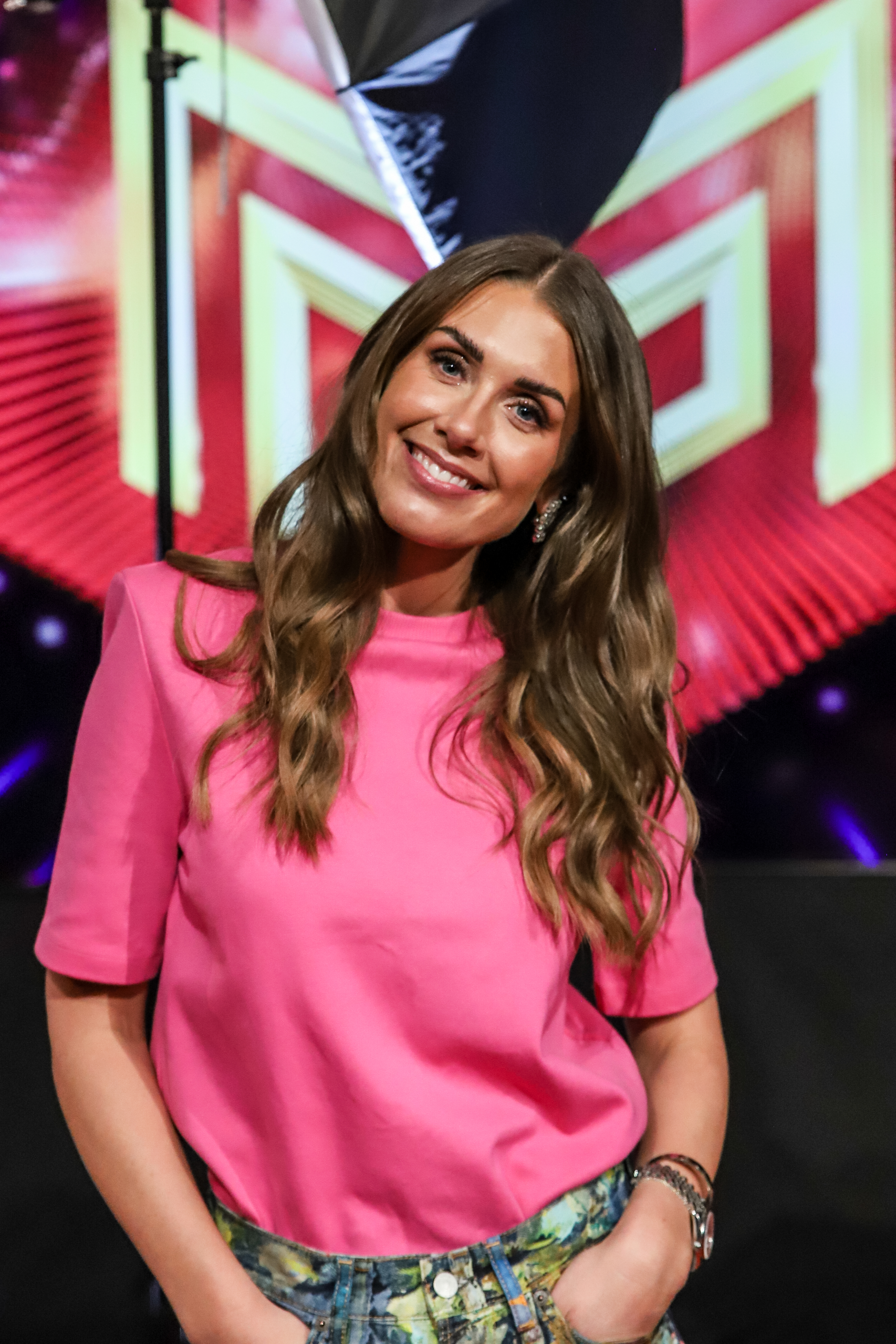
- Aaberge in January 2025
- Born: Tone Damli Aaberge; 12 April 1988 (age 38); Sogndal, Norway
- Occupations: Singer; songwriter; actress; voice actresses; television host
- Years active: 2005–present
- Musical career
- Genres: Pop; electronic
- Label: Eccentric Music
- Website: www.tonedamli.com

Tone Damli Aaberge (born 12 April 1988) is a Norwegian singer-songwriter and actress. She became famous for being a contestant in the Norwegian version of the Idol series.

Damli was the runner-up in the Norwegian version of Idol in 2005, following Jorun Stiansen in the final. Despite not winning, she has become very popular in her native Norway releasing four albums, Bliss, Sweet Fever, I Know, and Cocool. Bliss and I Know have been certified gold in Norway, one Compilation album, one Christmas album, one EP and 21 singles. She contended in the Melodi Grand Prix 2009 finals, with the song Butterflies, and ended up in the runner-up position, following Alexander Rybak. She also participated in the Norwegian version of Dancing with the Stars in 2006 finishing in third place.

She contended together with Erik Segerstedt in the Swedish Melodifestivalen 2013 semi-finals, with the song Hello Goodbye. They performed in the second semi-final and qualified to the Andra Chansen in which they failed to advance to the finals.. She participated again in Melodi Grand Prix 2020 with the song Hurts Sometimes and was one of the automatically qualifiers for the final. She failed to advance to the Gold final. In 2025 she once again participated in Melodi Grand Prix with her song "Last Song" she scored 5th place.

On 18 August 2012, it was announced on the official Idol website that Damli will be the first of an all-new four-member jury of former Idol contestants to celebrate 10 years since the official debut of Idol in Norway, along with the first winner of the series, Kurt Nilsen.

== Personal life ==
In 2013, Damli entered a relationship with Markus Foss and the following year on 28 April 2014 gave birth to a girl.

In April 2025, she lost her older sister Tale Aaberge Nesse to suicide.

== Discography ==
=== Albums ===
Title	Album details	Peak chart positions	
Title	Album details	NOR	GRE
Bliss	Released: 5 December 2005; Label: Eccentric Music; Formats: CD	14	—
Sweet Fever	Released: 8 May 2007; Label: Eccentric Music; Formats: CD, digital download	8	—
I Know	Released: 30 March 2009; Label: Eccentric Music; Formats: CD, digital download	3	32
Cocool	Released: 18 October 2010; Label: Eccentric Music; Formats: CD, digital download	22	—
Looking Back	Released: 27 April 2012; Label: Eccentric Music; Formats: CD, digital download	13	—
Di Første Jul	Released: 17 November 2014; Label: Eccentric Music; Formats: CD, digital download	9	—

==== Extended plays ====
List of extended plays, with selected details
Title	Album details
Heartkill	Released: 20 January 2014; Label: Eccentric Music; Formats: Digital download

=== Singles ===
Year	Title	Peak chart positions		Album
Year	Title	NOR	SWE	Album
2005	"The Bliss Song"	—	—	Bliss
2006	"Somewhere Soft to Land"	—	—	Bliss
2007	"Fever"	6	—	Sweet Fever
2007	"Young and Foolish"	—	—	Sweet Fever
2009	"Butterflies"	2	—	I Know
2009	"I Know"	4	—	I Know
2010	"I Love You"	7	—	Cocool
2010	"Crazy Cool"	—	—	Cocool
2010	"Stuck in My Head" (featuring Vinni)	2	—	Cocool
2012	"Look Back"	8	—	Looking Back
2012	"Imagine" (featuring Eric Saade)	9	49	Looking Back
2012	"Smash"	—	—	Heartkill EP
2013	"Hello Goodbye" (with Erik Segerstedt)	—	14	Heartkill EP
2013	"Winner of a Losing Game"	1	—	Heartkill EP
2013	"Perfect World"	—	—	Heartkill EP
2014	"Heartkill"	—	—	Heartkill EP
2014	"Di Første Jul"	—	—	Di Første Jul
2017	"Pinnacle"	—	—	TBA
2017	"Strangers"	21	—	TBA
2018	"Seasick"	—	—	TBA
2020	"Hurt Sometimes"	—	—	TBA
2020	"If I Can't Have You"	—	—	TBA
2020	"Skyfri himmel"	—	—	TBA
2025	"Last Song"	—	—	Melodi Grand Prix 2025

Notes

1. Releases until 2009 credited to Tone Damli Aaberge. From 2010 onward to Tone Damli.

== Filmography ==
- 2006: Over the Hedge – Norwegian voice of "Heather"
