= I Know (Tone Damli song) =

Single by Tone Damli Aaberge

from the album I Know
- Released: 27 April 2009
- Recorded: 2009
- Genre: Pop
- Length: 3:57
- Label: Eccentric Music

Tone Damli singles chronology
| "Butterflies" (2009) | "I Know" (2009) | "I Love You" (2009) |

"I Know" is a song by Norwegian singer Tone Damli from her third studio album I Know (2009). It was released in Norway on 27 April 2009. The song peaked at number 4 on the Norwegian Singles Chart.

== Track listing ==
Digital download
| No. | Title | Length |
|---|---|---|
| 1. | "I Know" | 3:57 |

== Chart performance ==
| Chart (2009) | Peak position |
|---|---|
| Norway (VG-lista) | 4 |

== Release history ==
| Region | Date | Format | Label |
|---|---|---|---|
| Norway | 27 April 2009 | Digital download | Eccentric Music |
