= Apparently Unaffected =

Studio album by Maria Mena
- Released: November 14, 2005
- Recorded: Viagram Studios, 2005
- Genre: Pop, folk, rock
- Length: 37:06
- Label: Sony Music, Columbia

Maria Mena chronology
| White Turns Blue (2004) | Apparently Unaffected (2005) | Cause and Effect (2008) |

Apparently Unaffected is the third album by the Norwegian singer-songwriter Maria Mena, released on November 14, 2005, in Europe. It was re-released in June 2006 in the Netherlands, where it peaked at No. 11. The album spawned four singles: "Miss You Love", "Just Hold Me", "Our Battles", and the final single "Nevermind Me" in early 2008. The album ended up at the #48 position in the year end chart of 2006 in the Netherlands. The album was produced by Arvid Solvang.

== Track listing ==
1. "Internal Dialogue" – 2:53
2. "This Bottle of Wine" – 2:32
3. "Miss You Love" – 3:09
4. "Boytoy Baby" – 2:51
5. "If You'll Stay in My Past (Part 1)" – 1:09
6. "He's Hurting Me" feat. Gunnhild Sundli – 2:20
7. "Just Hold Me" – 4:24
8. "Long Time Coming" – 2:45
9. "If You'll Stay in My Past (Part 2)" – 1:18
10. "Nevermind Me" – 3:55
11. "These Shoes" – 1:54
12. "Our Battles" – 3:33
13. "Calm Under the Waves" – 3:22
14. "If You'll Stay in My Past (Part 3)" – 1:00

== Charts ==
=== Weekly ===
| Chart (2005–07) | Peak position |
|---|---|
| Austrian Albums (Ö3 Austria) | 40 |
| Dutch Albums (Album Top 100) | 11 |
| German Albums (Offizielle Top 100) | 22 |
| Norwegian Albums (VG-lista) | 6 |
| Swiss Albums (Schweizer Hitparade) | 56 |

=== Year-end ===
| Year | Chart | Position |
|---|---|---|
| 2006 | Dutch Albums (MegaCharts) | 48 |
| 2007 | Dutch Albums (MegaCharts) | 46 |
| 2007 | German Albums (Offizielle Top 100) | 59 |

=== Year-end charts of "Just Hold Me" ===
| Chart (2007) | Rank |
|---|---|
| German Singles Chart | 39 |

== Certifications ==
| Region | Certification | Certified units/sales |
|---|---|---|
| Germany (BVMI) | Gold | 100,000^{^} |
| Netherlands (NVPI) | Platinum | 80,000^{^} |
^{^} Shipments figures based on certification alone.

== Singles ==
- "Miss You Love"

It was first released on February 13, 2006. It was recorded in Viagram Studios in 2005. Written by Maria Mena and Arvid Solvang. Produced by Arvid Solvang. "Miss You Love" is the official first single off the album. The first time it was released, it did not chart anywhere. After the release of the second single "Just Hold Me", it was re-released in the Netherlands at the end of 2006 and charted in 2007. The song charted at No. 19 (Dutch Mega Top 50), No. 61 (Dutch Mega Single Top 100)

- "Just Hold Me"

It was released on April 24, 2006. It was recorded in Viagram Studios in 2005. Written by Maria Mena and Arvid Solvang. Produced by Arvid Solvang. "Just Hold Me" is the second single off the album and was released end April 2006. The song then did not chart in the official Dutch Top 40, but did chart and peak in the country's physical singles chart (Mega Single Top 100) at No. 27 and the Mega Top 50. In October 2006, the song started getting heavy airplay again and this time it did manage to reach the Dutch Top 40 and peaked at number twenty-six (#6). In the Mega Single Top 100, it peaked at number 7 (#7) in the beginning of November 2006. It was her big breakthrough in the Netherlands, being in the Mega Top 50 for 34 weeks.

- "Miss You Love" (re-release)

Due to the success of "Just Hold Me", it was re-released in the Netherlands. It made a new peak at No. 2 (Norway) No. 5 (Dutch Mega Top 50), No. 7 (Dutch Mega Single Top 100), No. 26 (Dutch Top 40), No. 147 (Eurochart), No. 19 (German Charts)

- "Our Battles"

It was released in 2007. Recorded in Viagram Studios in 2005. Written by Maria Mena and Arvid Solvang. Produced by Arvid Solvang. "Our Battles" is the third single off the album. It was released in Norway at the end of 2006, but did not chart. The music video for the song premiered in Norway on November 18, 2006. The song was officially meant to be the second single in the Netherlands, but due to the success of "Just Hold Me", Sony BMG decided to re-release "Miss You Love".

- "Nevermind Me"

It was released as the final single off the album. The music video features the German actor Matthias Schweighöfer.
