= What Are Words (album) =

Studio album by Chris Medina
- Released: November 26, 2011 (Sweden)
- Recorded: 2011
- Genre: Rock
- Length: 43:21
- Label: Sony Music

What Are Words is the debut album of the American singer Chris Medina. The album was released by Sony Music contains 11 pop-rock songs, some of them sensitive ballads, others more energetic and rocking.

Album included the title track "What Are Words", a touching track inspired by Chris Medina's fiancé who had a serious brain injury after a car accident in 2009. Although "What Are Words" was only a minor hit in the United States, it was a big hit in Scandinavian countries topping both Norwegian VG-lista Singles Chart and the Swedish Sverigetopplistan Singles Chart. It stayed at #1 for 11 weeks in Norway and for 8 weeks in Sweden.

The follow-up single from the album is "One More Time" written by Medina. The album What Are Words was released in Sweden on 26 November 2011 and entered the Swedish Albums Chart straight in at #7 on Week 47 dated 2 December 2011.

== Track listing ==
1. "Dont Say Goodbye" (3:46)
2. "One More Time" (4:05)
3. "Possible" (3:30)
4. "What Are Words" (3:07)
5. "Dream Tonight" (4:37)
6. "We Can Change the World" (4:31)
7. "Amazed" (3:51)
8. "Summer Rain" (4:18)
9. "Falling in Deeper" (4:28)
10. "Beautiful Eyes" (3:33)
11. "Juliet" (3:29)

== Charts ==
=== Weekly charts ===
Chart (2011)	Peak position
Norwegian Albums (VG-lista)	7
Swedish Albums (Sverigetopplistan)	5

=== Year-end charts ===
Chart (2011)	Position
Swedish Albums (Sverigetopplistan)	35
