= Prescription Songs =

American music publishing company

- Industry: Music publishing
- Founded: 2009; 17 years ago
- Founders: Dr. Luke
- Headquarters: Los Angeles, United States
- Key people: Rhea Pasricha (head of A&R, West Coast); Sara Walker (senior vice president, Creative Synch); Megan Wood-Petersen (vice president, Creative Synch)
- Services: Music publishing
- Number of employees: 25
- Website: prescriptionsongs.com

Prescription Songs is an independent music publishing and licensing company founded in 2009 by Łukasz "Dr. Luke" Gottwald.

== History ==
Between 2013 and 2017, Prescription Songs held a joint publishing deal with Nashville-based Big Machine Records to build bridges between songwriters in the Nashville and Los Angeles music industries. The company expanded its own presence in Nashville with the establishment of a second Prescription Songs headquarters in 2016.

In 2014, recording artist Kesha sued Dr. Luke for sexual assault, emotional abuse, and psychological abuse. Since then, songwriters and others affiliated with Prescription Songs have come under scrutiny for their perceived connections to Dr. Luke. Ethel Cain, who signed to Prescription Songs in 2020, stated in a 2023 Rolling Stone interview that she regretted her decision and would not have signed to the label had she been aware of Dr. Luke's involvement. Cain left Prescription Songs as soon as she fulfilled her contractual obligations to the company.

Prescription Songs partnered with BitPay in 2021, becoming the first major music company to offer songwriters and music producers payment in Bitcoin.

== Writers ==
=== Current ===
Songwriters on the Prescription Songs roster include:

- A.C.
- Lil Aaron
- Ammo
- Chloe Angelides
- Nick Bailey
- Becky G
- Big Boss Vette
- Billboard
- Bülow
- Trey Campbell
- Greyson Chance
- Chopsquad DJ
- Trent Dabbs
- DallasK
- JT Daly
- Zella Day
- Doja Cat
- Anderson East
- Ejae
- Peter Fenn
- Frenship
- Fridayy
- Chloe George
- Shy Girls
- Kayla Rae Haywood
- Jacob Kasher Hindlin
- Sarah Hudson
- Parson James
- Ryder Johnson
- Jordy
- Aaron Joseph
- Lu Kala
- KBeazy
- Kool Kojak
- Lauren LaRue
- Lauv
- LunchMoney Lewis
- Lil Bibby
- Lil Jon
- Liz
- Lourdiz
- Dr. Luke
- Lxandra
- Malibu Babie
- Ammar Malik
- Bonnie McKee
- Morgan Nagler
- Tim Nelson
- Ryan Ogren
- Joy Oladokun
- Vaughn Oliver
- Rob Persaud
- Kim Petras
- Play-N-Skillz
- David Pramik
- R. City
- Megan Redmond
- JT Roach
- Rocco Did It Again!
- Maggie Rose
- Heather Russell
- Nick Ruth
- Snow Wife
- Sohn
- Space Primates
- Spellz
- Kyle Stemberger
- Supakaine
- Vancouver Sleep Clinic
- Emily Warren

=== Former ===
Former songwriters on the Prescription Songs roster include:

- Benny Blanco
- Ethel Cain
- Cirkut
- Elliphant
- Fancy Hagood
- Kesha
- Katy Perry
- RaeLynn
- Sabi
- Kelly Sheehan
- Peter Svensson
- Emily Wright
