= Nick Ruth =

- Genres: Pop; dance; alternative; indie rock
- Occupations: Record producer; songwriter
- Years active: 2013–present

Nick Ruth is an American record producer and songwriter based in Los Angeles. He has produced and written for artists such as Kelly Clarkson, Prestyn Smith, Nick Jonas, Ellie Goulding, Wiz Khalifa, Carly Rae Jepsen, Andy Grammer, Mikky Ekko and more.

== Discography ==
Year	Artist	Title	Label	Role
2026	Prestyn Smith	"closure"	Independent	Composer, Songwriter, Producer, Bass Guitar, Electric Guitar, Piano
2023	Lexi Jayde	"you just wanted sex (demo)"	APG	Co-writer, producer
2023	Bakar	"All Night"	Black Butter Limited	Co-writer
2023	Elliot Greer	"I Bought a Honda"	Arista Records	Co-producer
2023	Rowan Drake	"Haunt Me"	Atlantic Records	Co-writer, producer
2023	Lauren Spencer Smith	"That Part"	Island Records	Co-producer
2023	Lauren Spencer Smith	"Fantasy (With GAYLE and Em Beihold)"	Island Records	Co-producer
2022	John K	"Be Alright"	Epic Records	Co-writer, producer
2022	Thomas Day	"The End"	Arista Records	Co-writer, producer
2022	Olivia O'Brien	"Never Be The One"	Island Records	Co-writer, Producer
2022	Leah Kate	"Alive and Unwell"	10K Projects	Co-writer, Co-producer
2022	The Monroes	"Right At Home"	The Bakery	Co-writer, Co-producer
2022	Thomas Day	"Not My Job Anymore"	Arista Records	Co-writer, Producer
2022	Lauren Spencer Smith	“Flowers - Guitar Version"	Island Records	Producer
2022	Lexi Jayde	"self sabotage"	APG	Co-writer, producer
2022	Lexi Jayde	"hate to be you"	APG	Co-writer, producer
2022	Lexi Jayde	"drunk text me"	APG	Co-writer, co-producer
2021	OCTAVIO the Dweeb	"We're All Falling Apart"	APG	Co-writer, producer
2021	Patrick Droney	"Like The Water"	Warner Records	Co-writer
2021	Lexi Jayde	"walkin away"	APG	Co-writer, producer
2021	OCTAVIO the Dweeb	"Nights Like This"	APG	Co-writer, producer
2021	Royal & The Serpent	searching for nirvana ("i am")	Atlantic Records	Co-writer, co-producer
2021	JP Saxe	Dangerous Levels of Introspection ("For Emilee")	Arista Records	Co-writer, co-producer
2021	OCTAVIO the Dweeb	"Slow Drag"	APG	Co-writer, producer
2021	Anderson East	"Drugs"	A Low Country Sound / Elektra Records	Co-writer
2021	OCTAVIO the Dweeb	"Someday I'll Be Happy"	APG	Co-writer, producer
2021	Emmit Fenn	Far From Here ("Far From Here", "Edge Of The Dark", "Colors", "Light That Shines Through", "Closer To You", "Where I Went Wrong", "Until We Leave The Ground", "We Could Have It All", "The Table", "Moving On")	TH3RD BRAIN Records LLC	Co-producer
2021	Zak Abel	"Be Kind"	Universal Music GmbH	Co-writer, producer
2020	John K	love + everything else ("learning how to love", "cheap sunglasses", "happiness")	Epic Records	Co-writer, producer
2019	Fitz and the Tantrums	All The Feels ("Ready or Not")	Elektra Records	Co-writer
2019	Andy Grammer	"My Own Hero"	S-Curve	Writer, Producer
2019	James TW	Chapters ("You & Me", "Incredible", "Happy For Me", "Boys & Girls", "Big Picture", "Suitcase", "My Somebody", "If I Didn't Tell You", "Right Into Your Love")	Island Records	Producer
2019	Johnny Orlando	"Deep Down"	Island Records	Writer, Producer
2019	Frenship	"Keep You Close"	Columbia Records	Writer, Producer
2018	Joseph Angel	"Shame"	Roc Nation	Producer
2018	Joseph Angel	"Smile"	Roc Nation	Producer
2018	J Hart	"Put It To Bed"	--	Writer, producer
2017	Steve Angello	Human ("Break Me Down")	Size Records	Writer
2017	Kelly Clarkson	Meaning of Life ("Move You", "Slow Dance")	Atlantic Records	Writer, producer
2017	Olivia O'Brien	"Empty"	Island Records	Writer
2017	Andy Grammer	The Good Parts ("Always")	S-Curve Records	Writer, producer
2017	Erik Hassle	Innocence Lost ("Pathetic")	TEN Music Group	Writer, producer
2017	Emily Warren	"Poking Holes," "Hurt By You"	--	Writer, producer
2017	Kita Alexander	Hotel ("Damage Done")	Warner Music Australia	Writer
2017	Milck	Quiet	Atlantic Records	Producer
2016	Carly Rae Jepsen	E•MO•TION ("Cry")	604, School Boy, Interscope	Writer, producer
2016	Elliphant	Living Life Golden ("Thing Called Life")	TEN, Kemosabe	Writer, producer
2016	James TW	First Impressions ("Please Keep Loving Me," "For You," "When You Love Someone)	Island Records	Producer
2016	Billy Gilman	The Voice Complete Season 11 Collection ("Because of Me")	Republic Records	Writer, producer
2016	Frenship	Truce - EP ("1000 Nights")	Columbia Records	Writer, producer
2015	Mikky Ekko	Time ("Made of Light")	RCA Records	Writer, producer
2015	Aqualung	10 Futures ("Everything")	Golden Section Recordings	Writer
2015	Night Terrors of 1927	Everything's Coming Up Roses ("Dust and Bones," "Running in Place," "Always Take You Back")	Atlantic Records	Writer, producer
2015	James TW	"Black and Blue"	Island Records	Producer
2015	Frenship w/ Matoma	"Knives"	Columbia Records	Writer
2014	Nick Jonas	Nick Jonas ("I Want You")	Island Records	Writer, producer
2014	Zara Larsson	1 ("Rooftop")	TEN, Epic, Sony	Writer, producer
2014	Wiz Khalifa	Blacc Hollywood ("Stayin Out All Night")	Rostrum, Atlantic	Writer, producer
2014	Erik Hassle	Somebody's Party ("Pathetic")	TEN, RCA	Writer, producer
2013	Active Child	Rapor ("Silhouette" featuring Ellie Goulding)	Vagrant Records	Producer
2013	Mikky Ekko	The Hunger Games: Catching Fire – Original Motion Picture Soundtrack ("Place For Us")	Republic, Mercury	Writer, producer
