= Don't Start Now =

2019 single by Dua Lipa

Single by Dua Lipa

from the album Future Nostalgia
- Released: 31 October 2019
- Recorded: July 2019
- Studio: TaP (London); Zenseven (Los Angeles)
- Genre: Nu-disco
- Length: 3:03
- Label: Warner
- Songwriters: Dua Lipa; Caroline Ailin; Emily Warren; Ian Kirkpatrick
- Producer: Ian Kirkpatrick

Dua Lipa singles chronology
"Swan Song" (2019)	"Don't Start Now" (2019)	"Physical" (2020)

Music video
- "Don't Start Now" on YouTube

"Don't Start Now" is a song by English singer Dua Lipa. Lipa wrote the song with Caroline Ailin, Emily Warren, and its producer Ian Kirkpatrick. The song was released for digital download and streaming by Warner Records on 31 October 2019, as the lead single from her second studio album, Future Nostalgia (2020). A nu-disco song, it features a funk bassline, inspired by music by the Bee Gees, Daft Punk and Two Door Cinema Club. Elements used in the production include handclaps, a crowd noise, cowbells, synth bursts and accented strings. Lyrically, Lipa celebrates her independence and instructs a former lover to forget about their past relationship.

"Don't Start Now" received widespread critical acclaim upon its release, with many reviewers noting significant growth in Lipa's sound and vocals. Critics also praised the use of 1980s and disco sounds for standing out among other pop releases at the time. At the 63rd Annual Grammy Awards, the song was nominated in three categories: Record of the Year, Song of the Year, and Best Pop Solo Performance. The song peaked at number two on both the UK Singles Chart and the US Billboard Hot 100, surpassing Lipa's 2017 song "New Rules" to become her highest-charting single on the latter. In the UK, the song registered the seventh-longest top 10 stay on the chart.

"Don't Start Now" is considered to be the beginning of a revival for disco music in 2020 as downtempo, urban-styled music previously dominated mainstream music. The music video was directed by Nabil Elderkin and filmed in Brooklyn. It features point-of-view and high-angle shots of Lipa dancing at a crowded nightclub and masquerade ball. To promote the song, Lipa performed it on many television programmes and awards shows, including the 2019 MTV Europe Music Awards, the 2019 American Music Awards and the 2019 Mnet Asian Music Awards. Numerous remixes have accompanied the song, including an extended Live in L.A. Remix which features a 19-piece live band, for which an accompanying music video directed by Daniel Carberry was also released.

== Writing and production ==
Lipa wrote "Don't Start Now" with the same team who wrote her 2017 single "New Rules": Caroline Ailin, Emily Warren and Ian Kirkpatrick. The song came about after Joe Kentish, the A&R head at Lipa's label Warner Records, challenged Kirkpatrick in late 2018 to recreate the success of "New Rules". The first writing session took place after Warren invited Ailin and Kirkpatrick to her home in Wyoming to attend a disco night at a local dive bar where songs including Gloria Gaynor's "I Will Survive" (1978) were played. Inspired by that night, they decided to write a disco song the next morning as "it's the most fun to dance to". The song's initial concept was based on Ailin's feelings of responsibility towards her ex following their relationship.

Kirkpatrick also worked with producer J Kash, inviting several writers to help find a sound for the song, which became a back-and-forth between 1980s and disco music. They contemplated emulating music by Madonna, and created more than 10 reference tracks for Lipa to sample and choose from. Ailin, Warren and Kirkpatrick eventually co-wrote the song with Lipa in January 2019. The cowbell used on the song was present on the first demo and inspired by Two Door Cinema Club's music. Kirkpatrick based it on Lipa's phrasing in the chorus. According to him, the strings are a combination of Kontakt Session Strings, "some weird Nexus 1970s string patch", and live strings. Although the bassline of "Don't Start Now" sounds live, Kirkpatrick created it with MIDI. It was influenced by similar basslines the Bee Gees and Daft Punk used in their music that he had listened to in his youth. Kirkpatrick used a Scarbee MM-Bass plug-in for the leading bass sound and played it on a keyboard before modifying it. He wanted to abstain from disco for a more 1990s sound in the bridge by adding sub-bass combined with thumb bass guitar and slaps in the drop from Trilian.

Lipa recorded most of her vocals with a Telefunken ELA M 251 tube microphone. Kirkpatrick said he understood the song better after Lipa sang it and was told by Kentish that the middle eight sounded like an "after-thought". He thus spent a further two weeks completing the song before sending stems to Josh Gudwin for mixing. To improve the middle eight, Kirkpatrick added a "vocal chop", and extra drums inspired by the Weeknd's song "Can't Feel My Face". He recalled, "The first version of the drums didn't sound as fat. I was worried that the song would sound too disco, too classic. It needed something new, to make it the perfect mix of old and new". Kirkpatrick had a separate project for the chord progression before the drop to help him decide which combination of piano and synths to use. For this section, he went through 25 different ideas and incorporated them into four versions. His final rough mix included nearly 100 tracks. Kirkpatrick sent the final version to Lipa when she was attending Glastonbury Festival in June 2019. "Don't Start Now" was recorded at Zenseven Studios in Los Angeles while the vocals were recorded at TaP Studio in London. Gudwin mixed the song at Henson Studios in Hollywood while Chris Gehringer mastered it at Sterling Sound in Edgewater, New Jersey.

== Music and lyrics ==
"Don't Start Now"
A nu-disco song set over a house beat, "Don't Start Now" features a string-backed, 1980s synth-pop chorus that makes use of a cowbell. Lipa addresses a needy ex-lover about moving on from their former relationship using bullet point lyricism.

Musically, "Don't Start Now" is a nu-disco song. (Note: Sources labeling "Don't Start Now" a nu-disco song: Billboard, Chicago Reader, Crack, E!, Glamour, Hot Press, MTV, musicOMH, PopMatters, Rolling Stone and Slant Magazine.) It features elements of dance-pop, Eurodance and synth-pop while channeling modern disco antecedents such as French house and Italo disco. (Note: Sources noting elements of dance-pop in "Don't Start Now": Billboard, Rolling Stone and Stereogum.; Sources noting elements of Eurodance in "Don't Start Now": Billboard and The Daily Beast.; Source noting elements of synth-pop in "Don't Start Now": Billboard.; Source noting French house and Italo disco channeling in "Don't Start Now": Nylon.) The song has a length of 3:03, and is composed in 4/4 time and the key of B minor, with a tempo of 124 beats per minute. Constructed in verse-chorus form, the verses and first two choruses have an Em–Bm–G–D–A chord progression, and the bridges chorus follows a Bm–D–Em7–F♯m7–Gmaj7 sequence. Several 1980s and disco tropes are included in the French bloghouse production, which also makes use of laser weapon sound effects, electro-violin stabs and handclaps. It additionally has a percolating funk bassline that interchanges with piano chords and the house beat.

The song opens with a three-chord piano intro from the first part of the chorus and a fuzz sound of a spinning record. Lipa eschews modulation in her vocals and build from a lower register to a natural use of melisma, spanning from the low note of A_{3} to the high note of D_{5}. It builds with the addition of accented disco strings, and bursts of disco synths. It has a strong kick and bass pattern that uses the low-end sparingly. After every fourth measure, a fill is used; for example, in the snare-kick sequence that precedes the second verse. A cowbell in appears in the anthemic, 1980s synth-pop chorus, which is backed by strings. The second verse adds a rhythm guitar loop and crowd noise is added in the second chorus. During the final chorus, chordal devices from the breakdown reappear for texture, and Lipa sings in call and response.

Various critics viewed the song as a sequel to "New Rules" as both have similar themes whereas "Don't Start Now" proves that the rules created to get over an ex in the former track actually work in a breakup. (Note: Sources comparing "Don't Start Now" to "New Rules": Billboard, NME and Stereogum.) According to Lipa, the lyrics have a theme of empowerment and are about "moving on" from a past relationship and "not allowing anyone to get in the way of that", while also finding confidence and happiness. She celebrates her independence, and uses bullet point instructions to address a needy former lover directly, with lyrics including, "Don't show up, don't come out / Don't start caring about me now / Walk away, you know how / Don't start caring about me now". Music critic Maura Johnston interpreted the lyrics as "post-breakup rebirth".

== Release and promotion ==
Prior to the single's release, Lipa panicked, never having asked for feedback on the song. Her manager, Ben Mawson, was concerned that its disco sound was too different from music popular on American radio at the time. However, Mawson was assured by his radio promotion executive that it was "the kind of song that could change the radio". On 10 October 2019, Variety mentioned the single's release date in an article about Lipa's management but subsequently edited the release date to "soon". Fans of Lipa leaked the song's title and lyrics on Twitter on 14 October 2019. Later that month, the singer cleared her social media accounts to announce the release of "Don't Start Now". She first shared two teaser videos on social media featuring snippets of the song on 22 and 23 October 2019. YouTube Music promoted the release on billboards in London and Times Square. The song was also promoted with its own lens filter on Snapchat.

"Don't Start Now" was released for digital download and streaming on 31 October 2019 as the lead single from Lipa's second studio album, Future Nostalgia (2020). The Radio 1 Breakfast Show played the song exclusively to an eight-year-old fan of Lipa before its release. The song was sent for radio airplay in Italy the following day. It impacted contemporary hit radio formats in the United States on 5 November 2019. "Don't Start Now" has been promoted with several remixes. Ones by Dom Dolla, Purple Disco Machine, Zach Witness and Kungs were released throughout November and December 2019. A remix EP which includes all the aforementioned remixes along with one by Pink Panda was released 10 January 2020, followed by a remix by Kosovan DJ Regard on 24 January. A "Live in LA" remix that features Lipa performing with a 19-piece band was released on 21 February 2020. It was preceded by the release of a music video directed by Daniel Carberry on 10 January 2020, which includes dancers and rollerbladers in the background. The video was nominated for Best Live Video at the 2020 UK Music Video Awards.

== Critical reception ==
"Don't Start Now" received widespread acclaim from music critics. In her review for Rolling Stone, Brittany Spanos called the song "the peak of pop catharsis" and "a Studio 54 fantasy"; she said it evolved Lipa's sound and that she "finally finds her pop footing". Nick Malone of PopMatters wrote that the song displays significant growth in Lipa's sound and identity, and that she is "springing forth in full colour" with sharper and more distinguishable vocals. For Under the Radar, Conrad Duncan observed the "fantastically sleek" song played to Lipa's strengths. Los Angeles Times pop critic Mikael Wood felt Lipa's vocals had grown more soulful and suited the "delightfully rubbery" song's retro sound. Similarly, Pitchfork's Matthew Strauss thought that the production suits Lipa and appreciated her non-modulated vocals, writing that "her voice sounds stronger than ever".

Laura Snapes of The Guardian cited Lipa's vocals as the song's best feature, writing that she distinguishes herself from her contemporaries with a classic style, rather than "the charts' predominant rap-influenced sound". Writing for Variety, Chris Willman felt it brought "a certain kind of deep groove and attitudinal buoyancy back onto the radio at a time we needed it most, which is anytime at all". Gigwise's Jordan Emery complimented its "satisfyingly catchy hooks and interesting ideas", and "slick bassline that just breathes effortlessness and joy". Jolie Lash of Spin viewed the bassline as "pop's best in recent memory" and called the song "an 'I Will Survive' for an era when we really need the reassurance". Writing for Exclaim!, Brad Garcia says "it wasn't until she released 'Don't Start Now' that Dua Lipa became a household name."

In her review for NME, Rhian Daly deemed the song "powerful pop perfection", while musicOMH's Nick Smith described the song as a "Moloko-esque nu-disco treasure". AllMusic's Neil Z. Yeung appreciated Lipa's "endless supply of confidence, charm, and cooler-than-you attitude", and called it an "immediate earworm". Jon Freeman of Rolling Stone similarly wrote that it has instant appeal, with "hooks piled upon hooks" and "a recipe for club glory". Entertainment Weekly's Marc Snetiker described it as a "dance floor jawdropper". The Daily Telegraph's music critic Neil McCormick regarded it as "a fantastic put-down of a needy ex". In The New York Times, Jon Caramanica explained the song was "effective but not overambitious", arguing that Lipa sells its "kiss-off sentiment with rhythm but not punch".

== Accolades ==
Time placed "Don't Start Now" fifth in its list of 2019's best songs, while Billboard and NME ranked the song at number 41 and 17 respectively. In 2020, Variety named it the best song of the year, and Consequence, Gigwise and Spin placed it in the 9th, 8th and 20th positions in their year-end lists, respectively. Rolling Stone ranked the song sixth on its 2020 year-end list. In September 2024, Pitchfork included "Don't Start Now" on their list of "The 100 Best Songs of the 2020s So Far", ranking it at number 53. "Don't Start Now" won the American Music Award for Favorite Pop/Rock Song at the 2020 ceremony, giving Lipa her first American Music Award. It received nominations for Best Song at the 2020 MTV Europe Music Awards as well as Best British Song and Best Song in the World at the 2020 NME Awards. At the 2020 Nickelodeon Mexico Kids' Choice Awards and 2020 LOS40 Music Awards, the song received respective nominations for Global Hit and Best International Song. It was awarded an iHeartRadio Titanium Award for receiving one billions spins on the station in the United States. The song was nominated for Record of the Year, Song of the Year and Best Pop Solo Performance at the 63rd Annual Grammy Awards, marking Lipa's first acknowledgment in all three categories. The song won Most Performed International Work at the APRA Music Awards of 2021.

== Commercial performance ==
In November 2019, "Don't Start Now" debuted at number two on the UK Singles Chart with first-week sales of 49,334 units, making it Lipa's highest debut on the chart and seventh UK top-10 single. It spent three consecutive weeks at number two; "Dance Monkey" by Tones and I kept it from the top spot. "Don't Start Now" charted for 25 weeks in the top 10, the seventh-longest overall, and spent 67 weeks on the chart in total. In April 2026, the song was certified quintuple platinum by the British Phonographic Industry (BPI) for track-equivalent sales of 3 million units. "Don't Start Now" topped the Irish Singles Chart for two consecutive weeks, making it Lipa's fourth chart-topper in Ireland.

In Australia, "Don't Start Now" entered the ARIA Singles Chart at number eight; it was Lipa's fifth single to reach the top 10 on the chart. The song spent 10 non-consecutive weeks at number two, placing it in joint-second with "Moves like Jagger" (2011) by Maroon 5 featuring Christina Aguilera for most weeks spent at number two without reaching number one. It was blocked from the top spot by "Dance Monkey". The song charted for 29 consecutive weeks in the top 10, the fourth-longest top 10 stay in the chart's history. It was certified eight-times platinum by the Australian Recording Industry Association (ARIA) for track-equivalent sales of 560,000 units. The song reached number three in New Zealand and was certified 7× platinum by Recorded Music NZ (RMNZ) for 210,000 track-equivalent unit sales.

"Don't Start Now" debuted at number 30 on the US Billboard Hot 100 with a first-week tally of 14,000 downloads sold, 13.2 million streams and 10.2 million radio impressions. In its nineteenth week on the chart, the song rose to number two, held off the top spot by Roddy Ricch's "The Box". It became Lipa's highest-charting single in the US, and her second to reach the top 10. "Don't Start Now" spent 52 weeks on the chart, becoming Lipa's first song to spend an entire year on the chart. In March 2021, the song received a quadruple platinum certification from the Recording Industry Association of America (RIAA) for track-equivalent sales of four million units. In Canada, it peaked at number three on the Canadian Hot 100 and was certified nine times platinum by Music Canada (MC) for track-equivalent sales of 720,000 units. In September 2020, almost a year following the song's release, Billboard introduced their Global 200 chart and "Don't Start Now" debuted at number 37 and later reached a peak of 30 the following March.

Elsewhere, and especially in Western and Northern Europe, the song was a smash hit, reaching the top ten in several countries, including Norway, The Netherlands, Denmark, Belgium, Germany, Austria and Switzerland. It reached equally the top twenty in France, Germany, Argentina, Colombia, Panama, Sweden and Spain and top thirty in Brazil.

== Music video ==
The music video for "Don't Start Now" was filmed on 14 October 2019 in Brooklyn. It was directed by Nabil Elderkin, who had previously worked with Lipa during her 2019 campaign for Yves Saint Laurent's Libre fragrance. The video was produced by Eric Brown with Operator Media serving as the production company. Elderkin found inspiration for the treatment by skating around London while listening to the song. He used darker lighting and moods in a balance he felt complimented "Don't Start Now". Various concepts and edits were explored before Lipa and her management signed off on the final cut. Lipa decided at the last minute to use the final scene at the start of the video. The music video premiered on YouTube on the day after the song's release.

A high-angle shot of the neon colour-schemed nightclub scene

The video opens with a point-of-view shot of Lipa leaving a nightclub and throwing the camera onto the pavement. The clip blacks out briefly before rewinding to a scene from five hours earlier. In it, Lipa enters a pub and removes her orange Raf Simons jacket to perform on stage in a yellow Versace bra top and Marni jeans. The video then cuts to a crowded nightclub where Lipa dances under a disco ball and spotlight. In the next scene, filmed in the Manhattan social club The Players, she dances at a 19th-century-themed masquerade ball, and notices eyes on paintings coming to life. She runs down a staircase to return to the nightclub, and is later shown washing her face in the bathroom there and strutting its hallway. The video ends with a cumulative montage of the evening's events.

Amy Francombe of The Face said Elderkin's signature directing style "shines through" in the neon colour schemes and high-angle shots. Writing for Paper, Brendan Wetmore described the video as "something straight out of the POV TikTok genre and put onto Vevo". In her review for Vogue, Rachel Hahn called it "a fine showcase for Lipa's expert post-breakup style". Nylon's Allison Stubblebine compared the crowded nightclub scene to one in Harry Styles' music video for "Lights Up". For the video, Elderkin was nominated for Best Direction at the 2020 MTV Video Music Awards, while the visual itself was nominated for Best Music Video at the 2020 Urban Music Awards.

== Live performances ==
Lipa gave her first live performance of "Don't Start Now" on 1 November 2019 on The Graham Norton Show. Two days later, she performed the song at the 2019 MTV Europe Music Awards. She wore a black leotard and was surrounded by a float of 40 dancers in yellow bodysuits during the performance, which was directed by Es Devlin; it was acclaimed by the media. BBC News reporter Mark Savage said, "Fans who'd previously made fun of her stage presence were won over by the dance moves and staging". Clash's Zoya Raza-Sheikh wrote, "All it took was a few minutes for the singer to – yet again – prove a questioning audience wrong". Writing for PopMatters, Evan Sawdey praised Lipa for "nailing tight choreography and delivering a striking stage presence heretofore unseen". Lipa's other renditions also featured floats of dancers and used the same dance routine, but were modified slightly to resonate on various stages. On 10 November 2019, she sang the song on the ninth season finale of The Voice of Germany with contestant Freschta Akbarzada.

At her 2019 American Music Awards performance on 24 November, she wore a red bodysuit and was backed by a float of dancers in silver costumes during the 1970s-inspired rendition, which featured a giant disco ball and cube-shaped side tables as props. The performance ended with silver, cushion-shaped balloons falling from the ceiling. In Australia, Lipa presented the song at the 2019 ARIA Music Awards on 27 November 2019, and on the breakfast television programme Sunrise the following day. In Japan, Lipa sang "Don't Start Now" in an all-black Versace outfit at the 2019 Mnet Asian Music Awards on 4 December 2019; South Korean singer Hwasa of Mamamoo opened for her, staging "New Rules". On 17 December, she performed the song on the 17th US season finale of The Voice surrounded by roller skaters in a showgirl-inspired set. Lipa performed the song on The Tonight Show Starring Jimmy Fallon with a string section on 19 December 2019, and on Good Morning America the following day. On 31 December, she played "Don't Start Now" in a chequerboard miniskirt on Dick Clark's New Year's Rockin' Eve. On 9 January 2020, Lipa performed the song on The Ellen DeGeneres Show. During the presentation, purple and blue lights were projected on stage, creating silhouettes of Lipa and her dancers against a white backdrop.

Lipa gave a virtual performance of "Don't Start Now" for The Late Late Show with James Corden on 30 March 2020, while in self-isolation during the COVID-19 pandemic. Her band, backing singers and dancers also performed from their respective homes via Zoom in a changing split-screen. On 22 April, she sang the song virtually on Big Brother Brasil 20. On 17 September 2020, the singer presented the song for a second time on The Late Late Show with James Corden; this time as a parody version with "New Rules", titled "New Rules For COVID Dating", where Corden sang backing vocals. Lipa wore an Alexandre Vauthier disco dress, covered in gold studs, as well as sheer black tights and black platforms, with two gold hair clips. For some parts of the show, she also wore a sparkly face mask that matches the dress. Lipa performed the song as the closing track on her Studio 2054 livestream concert, which took place on 27 November 2020. On 19 December, she performed the song on Saturday Night Live. For the performance, she wore a belted leopard-print top with black leggings and a gold chain necklace with a diamond, while dancing with backup dancers and a band. In 2021, Lipa performed the song as a medley with "Levitating" at the 63rd Annual Grammy Awards and it was also included in a medley of Future Nostalgia tracks for her performance at the 2021 Brit Awards. The song was later included on the setlist of Lipa's 2022 Future Nostalgia Tour, in the encore and closing the show.

== Awards ==
Year	Ceremony	Category	Result
2020	MTV Europe Music Award	Best Song	Nominated
2020	MTV Video Music Award	Best Direction	Nominated
2020	NME Award	Best Song in the World	Nominated
2020	NME Award	Best British Single	Nominated
2020	American Music Award	Favorite Pop Song	Won
2020	Danish Music Award	International Hit of the Year	Nominated
2021	Grammy Awards	Record of the Year	Nominated
2021	Grammy Awards	Song of the Year	Nominated
2021	Grammy Awards	Best Pop Solo Performance	Nominated
2021	Billboard Music Awards	Best Radio Song	Nominated
2021	iHeartRadio Music Awards	Best Lyrics	Nominated
2021	iHeartRadio Music Awards	Song Of The Year	Nominated
2021	iHeartRadio Music Awards	Best Music Video	Nominated

== Impact and legacy ==
"Don't Start Now" is considered to be the start of what would become a revival for disco music in 2020. At the time of its release, top 40 radio had been dominated by downtempo urban-styled music, and the song was one of very few dance tracks. Due to this, the song was also thought to have started a new wave of disco-oriented music in radio format. Some suspected that the song served as a "refuge" for some listeners during the COVID-19 pandemic as they were unable to attend hangouts with other individuals. Its bullet point lyricism was used as an instructional meme for social distancing protocols associated with the pandemic. It was included on the soundtracks of Love Island, Love, Victor, Riverdale, Just Dance 2021 and Resident Evil. The video game Fortnite also used the song in its soundtrack, where a dance created by Filipino TikTok user Hannah Kaye Balanay was used as an emote. Various vocal parts from the song were sampled by vaporwave group Death's Dynamic Shroud for their track "See Me" from their 2021 album Faith in Persona.

Several artists have covered "Don't Start Now". American singer Hayley Williams covered it for BBC Radio 1's Live Lounge in February 2020, along with her song "Simmer". The cover was categorised as an R&B song with jazz elements; it retained the funk elements of the original but used sultry and raspy vocals, backed by drums. American band Echosmith performed an indie rock rendition of the song for a Billboard live at home concert, along with a cover of Coldplay's "Fix You". Australian rapper Illy performed a rap over the song that addresses social distancing, the Australian government's COVIDSafe app, and Call of Duty: Modern Warfare. For Spotify Singles, Ingrid Andress recorded the song, converting it into an upbeat country ballad. On The Masked Singer, "Don't Start Now" was a part of Chloe Kim's setlists. In Dancing with the Stars and Strictly Come Dancing, actress Anne Heche and television presenter Clara Amfo both performed a cha-cha-cha dance to the song on each show, respectively.

== Track listings ==
- Digital download and streaming
1. "Don't Start Now" – 3:03
- Digital download and streaming – Dom Dolla remix
1. "Don't Start Now" (Dom Dolla remix) – 3:31
- Digital download and streaming – Dom Dolla extended remix
1. "Don't Start Now" (Dom Dolla remix) [extended] – 4:59
- Digital download and streaming – Purple Disco Machine remix
1. "Don't Start Now" (Purple Disco Machine remix) – 3:37
- Digital download and streaming – Purple Disco Machine extended remix
1. "Don't Start Now" (Purple Disco Machine remix) [extended] – 6:06
- Digital download and streaming – Zach Witness remix (Malibu Mermaids version)
1. "Don't Start Now" (Zach Witness remix) [Malibu Mermaids version] – 4:52
- Digital download and streaming – Zach Witness remixes
1. "Don't Start Now" (Zach Witness remix) [Midnight Monsters version] – 5:24
2. "Don't Start Now" (Zach Witness remix) [Malibu Mermaids version] – 4:52
- Digital download and streaming – Kungs remix
1. "Don't Start Now" (Kungs remix) – 3:36
- Digital download and streaming – Regard remix
1. "Don't Start Now" (Regard remix) – 3:08
- Digital EP – remixes
1. "Don't Start Now" (Dom Dolla remix) – 3:30
2. "Don't Start Now" (Purple Disco Machine remix) – 3:36
3. "Don't Start Now" (Zach Witness remix) [Malibu Mermaids version] – 4:52
4. "Don't Start Now" (Kungs remix) – 3:36
5. "Don't Start Now" (Pink Panda remix) – 2:05
6. "Don't Start Now" – 3:03
- Digital EP – remixes – Beatport version
1. "Don't Start Now" (Dom Dolla remix) [extended] – 4:59
2. "Don't Start Now" (Purple Disco Machine remix) [extended] – 6:06
3. "Don't Start Now" (Zach Witness remix) [Midnight Monsters version] – 5:24
4. "Don't Start Now" (Kungs remix) [extended] – 4:59
5. "Don't Start Now" (Pink Panda remix) [extended] – 3:31
6. "Don't Start Now" – 3:03
- Digital download and streaming – Live in LA remix
1. "Don't Start Now" (Live in LA remix) – 5:40
- Digital download and streaming – Kaytranada remix
1. "Don't Start Now" (Kaytranada remix) – 4:27
- Digital download and streaming – Yaeji remix
1. "Don't Start Now" (Yaeji remix) – 4:17

== Personnel ==
- Dua Lipa – vocals
- Ian Kirkpatrick – production, engineering, programming, vocal production
- Caroline Ailin – additional vocal production
- Emily Warren – backing vocals
- Alexander Aleynikov – assistant production
- Drew Jurecka – string arrangement, violin, viola, baritone violin, string engineer
- Josh Gudwin – mixing
- Elijah Marrett-Hitch – mix assisting
- Chris Gehringer – mastering
- Will Quinnell – mastering assistant

== See also ==
- List of most-streamed songs on Spotify
- List of Billboard number-one dance songs of 2020

== Charts ==
=== Weekly charts ===
2019–2021 weekly chart performance for "Don't Start Now"
Chart (2019–2021)	Peak position
Argentina Hot 100 (Billboard)	12
Australia (ARIA)	2
Austria (Ö3 Austria Top 40)	6
Belgium (Ultratop 50 Flanders)	2
Belgium (Ultratop 50 Wallonia)	3
Bolivia Airplay (Monitor Latino)	4
Brazil Airplay (Top 100 Brasil)	28
Bulgaria Airplay (PROPHON)	3
Canada Hot 100 (Billboard)	3
Canada AC (Billboard)	1
Canada CHR/Top 40 (Billboard)	1
Canada Hot AC (Billboard)	2
CIS Airplay (TopHit)	6
Chile Airplay (Monitor Latino)	4
Colombia Airplay (National-Report)	19
Costa Rica Airplay (FONOTICA)	16
Croatia International Airplay (Top lista)	1
Czech Republic Airplay (ČNS IFPI)	2
Czech Republic Singles Digital (ČNS IFPI)	4
Denmark (Tracklisten)	4
Dominican Republic Airplay (SodinPro)	12
Ecuador Airplay (National-Report)	1
El Salvador Airplay (ASAP EGC)	2
Estonia (Eesti Tipp-40)	4
Euro Digital Song Sales (Billboard)	2
Finland (Suomen virallinen lista)	13
France (SNEP)	12
Germany (GfK)	10
Global 200 (Billboard)	30
Greece International (IFPI)	3
Hungary (Dance Top 40)	3
Hungary (Rádiós Top 40)	1
Hungary (Single Top 40)	2
Hungary (Stream Top 40)	2
Iceland (Tónlistinn)	2
Ireland (IRMA)	1
Israel International Airplay (Media Forest)	1
Italy (FIMI)	11
Italy Airplay (EarOne)	1
Japan Hot 100 (Billboard)	79
Latvia Streaming (LaIPA)	4
Lebanon (Lebanese Top 20)	7
Lithuania (AGATA)	2
Luxembourg Digital Song Sales (Billboard)	3
Malaysia (RIM)	5
Mexico Airplay (Billboard)	2
Mexico Streaming (AMPROFON)	7
Netherlands (Dutch Top 40)	2
Netherlands (Single Top 100)	5
New Zealand (Recorded Music NZ)	3
Norway (VG-lista)	5
Panama Airplay (Monitor Latino)	12
Paraguay Airplay (Monitor Latino)	7
Peru Airplay (Monitor Latino)	6
Poland Airplay (ZPAV)	4
Portugal (AFP)	3
Romania Airplay (Media Forest)	8
Russia Airplay (TopHit)	6
Scottish Singles Sales (Official Charts)	2
Singapore (RIAS)	1
Slovakia Airplay (ČNS IFPI)	3
Slovakia Singles Digital (ČNS IFPI)	3
Slovenia Airplay (SloTop50)	1
South Korea (Gaon)	18
Spain (Promusicae)	12
Sweden (Sverigetopplistan)	12
Switzerland (Schweizer Hitparade)	7
Ukraine Airplay (TopHit)	17
UK Singles (Official Charts)	2
Uruguay Airplay (Monitor Latino)	7
US Billboard Hot 100	2
US Adult Contemporary (Billboard)	5
US Adult Pop Airplay (Billboard)	1
US Dance Airplay (Billboard)	1
US Dance Club Songs (Billboard)	1
US Pop Airplay (Billboard)	1
US Rhythmic Airplay (Billboard)	31
US Rolling Stone Top 100	3

2023 weekly chart performance for "Don't Start Now"
Chart (2023)	Peak position
Estonia Airplay (TopHit)	189
Moldova Airplay (TopHit)	8

2026 weekly chart performance for "Don't Start Now"
Chart (2026)	Peak position
Brazil Airplay (Crowley)	146
Lithuania Airplay (TopHit)	79

=== Monthly charts ===
2019 Monthly chart performance for "Don't Start Now"
Chart (2019)	Peak position
CIS Airplay (TopHit)	10
Czech Republic (Rádio Top 100)	16
Czech Republic (Singles Digitál Top 100)	13
Latvia Airplay (LaIPA)	5
Russia Airplay (TopHit)	8
Slovakia (Rádio Top 100)	29
Slovakia (Singles Digitál Top 100)	5
Ukraine Airplay (TopHit)	39

2020 Monthly chart performance for "Don't Start Now"
Chart (2020)	Peak position
CIS Airplay (TopHit)	17
Czech Republic (Rádio Top 100)	4
Czech Republic (Singles Digitál Top 100)	4
Russia Airplay (TopHit)	19
Slovakia (Rádio Top 100)	3
Slovakia (Singles Digitál Top 100)	5

2021 Monthly chart performance for "Don't Start Now"
Chart (2021)	Peak position
Czech Republic (Singles Digitál Top 100)	58
Slovakia (Singles Digitál Top 100)	80

=== Year-end charts ===
2019 year-end chart performance for "Don't Start Now"
Chart (2019)	Position
CIS Airplay (TopHit)	170
Hungary (Single Top 40)	77
Hungary (Stream Top 40)	49
Netherlands (Dutch Top 40)	68
Russia Airplay (TopHit)	158
Tokyo (Tokio Hot 100)	61

2020 year-end chart performance for "Don't Start Now"
Chart (2020)	Position
Australia (ARIA)	3
Austria (Ö3 Austria Top 40)	17
Belgium (Ultratop Flanders)	7
Belgium (Ultratop Wallonia)	11
Brazil Airplay (Crowley)	44
Canada (Canadian Hot 100)	3
Colombia Airplay (Monitor Latino)	66
CIS Airplay (TopHit)	93
Croatia International Airplay (Top lista)	2
Denmark (Tracklisten)	15
El Salvador (ASAP EGC)	3
France (SNEP)	36
Germany (Official German Charts)	19
Hungary (Dance Top 40)	15
Hungary (Rádiós Top 40)	2
Hungary (Single Top 40)	17
Hungary (Stream Top 40)	6
Iceland (Tónlistinn)	7
Ireland (IRMA)	6
Italy (FIMI)	41
Mexico Airplay (Monitor Latino)	5
Mexico Streaming (Monitor Latino)	5
Netherlands (Dutch Top 40)	13
Netherlands (Single Top 100)	12
New Zealand (Recorded Music NZ)	4
Nicaragua Airplay (Monitor Latino)	76
Norway (VG-lista)	16
Poland (Polish Airplay Top 100)	52
Portugal (AFP)	6
Romania (Airplay 100)	73
Russia Airplay (TopHit)	101
South Korea (Gaon)	33
Spain (PROMUSICAE)	38
Sweden (Sverigetopplistan)	22
Switzerland (Schweizer Hitparade)	15
UK Singles (OCC)	6
US Billboard Hot 100	4
US Adult Contemporary (Billboard)	9
US Adult Top 40 (Billboard)	3
US Dance/Mix Show Airplay (Billboard)	1
US Mainstream Top 40 (Billboard)	4
Venezuela Airplay (Monitor Latino)	96
Worldwide (IFPI)	5

2021 year-end chart performance for "Don't Start Now"
Chart (2021)	Position
Australia (ARIA)	45
Brazil Streaming (Pro-Música Brasil)	113
Croatia International Airplay (Top lista)	77
Global 200 (Billboard)	30
Hungary (Dance Top 40)	50
Portugal (AFP)	54
South Korea (Gaon)	97
UK Singles (OCC)	78
US Adult Contemporary (Billboard)	11
US Digital Song Sales (Billboard)	59

2022 year-end chart performance for "Don't Start Now"
Chart (2022)	Position
Australia (ARIA)	70
Global 200 (Billboard)	66
Hungary (Dance Top 40)	59
Hungary (Rádiós Top 40)	55

2023 year-end chart performance for "Don't Start Now"
Chart (2023)	Position
Hungary (Rádiós Top 40)	93
Moldova Airplay (TopHit)	127

Year-end chart performance
Chart (2025)	Position
Argentina Anglo Airplay (Monitor Latino)	57
Chile Airplay (Monitor Latino)	91
Hungary (Rádiós Top 40)	54

== Certifications ==
Certifications
Region	Certification	Certified units/sales
Australia (ARIA)	8× Platinum	560,000^{‡}
Austria (IFPI Austria)	3× Platinum	90,000^{‡}
Belgium (BRMA)	2× Platinum	80,000^{‡}
Brazil (Pro-Música Brasil)	3× Diamond	480,000^{‡}
Canada (Music Canada)	Diamond	800,000^{‡}
Denmark (IFPI Danmark)	3× Platinum	270,000^{‡}
France (SNEP)	Diamond	333,333^{‡}
Germany (BVMI)	3× Gold	600,000^{‡}
Italy (FIMI)	3× Platinum	210,000^{‡}
New Zealand (RMNZ)	8× Platinum	240,000^{‡}
Norway (IFPI Norway)	3× Platinum	180,000^{‡}
Poland (ZPAV)	Diamond	100,000^{‡}
Portugal (AFP)	7× Platinum	70,000^{‡}
Spain (Promusicae)	5× Platinum	300,000^{‡}
United Kingdom (BPI)	5× Platinum	3,000,000^{‡}
United States (RIAA)	4× Platinum	4,000,000^{‡}
Streaming
Chile (Profovi)	Gold	14,000,000
Japan (RIAJ)	Gold	50,000,000^{†}
South Korea (KMCA)	Platinum	100,000,000^{†}
^{‡} Sales+streaming figures based on certification alone.^{†} Streaming-only figures based on certification alone.

== Release history ==
Release dates and formats
Region	Date	Format(s)	Version	Label	Ref.
Various	31 October 2019	Digital download; streaming	Original	Warner	
Italy	1 November 2019	Radio airplay	Original	Warner	
United States	5 November 2019	Contemporary hit radio	Original	Warner	
Various	26 November 2019	Digital download; streaming	Dom Dolla remixes	Warner	
Various	6 December 2019	Digital download; streaming	Purple Disco Machine remixes	Warner	
Various	6 December 2019	Digital download; streaming	Zach Witness remixes	Warner	
Various	18 December 2019	Digital download; streaming	Kungs remix	Warner	
France	21 December 2019	Radio airplay	Kungs remix	Warner	
Various	10 January 2020	Digital download; streaming	Remix EP	Warner	
Various	24 January 2020	Digital download; streaming	Regard remix	Warner	
Various	21 February 2020	Digital download; streaming	Live in LA remix	Warner	
Various	11 September 2020	Digital download; streaming	Kaytranada remix	Warner	
Various	11 September 2020	Digital download; streaming	Yaeji remix	Warner	
