= Emily Warren =

American singer and songwriter (born 1992)

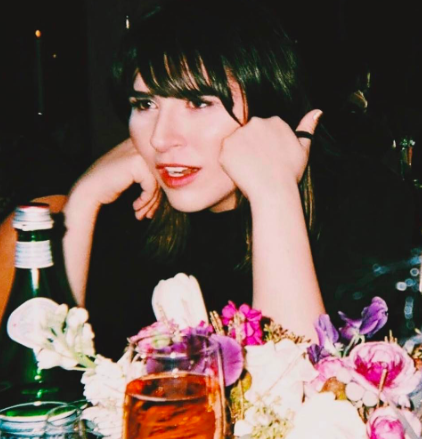
- Warren in 2016

Background information
- Born: Emily Warren Schwartz; August 25, 1992 (age 34); New York City, U.S.
- Genre: Pop
- Occupations: Singer; songwriter
- Instruments: Vocals; piano; guitar; harp
- Years active: 2015–present
- Publisher: Prescription Songs

Emily Warren Schwartz (born August 25, 1992) is an American singer and songwriter. Her debut studio album, Quiet Your Mind, was released in 2019.

Warren had her first hit as a songwriter in 2016 as a co-writer on the Chainsmokers' song "Don't Let Me Down" (featuring Daya). At the 2020 Grammy Awards, she was nominated for Song of the Year category for co-writing Dua Lipa's "Don't Start Now", which has since been streamed more than 3 billion times on Spotify, becoming one of the most streamed songs of all time on the platform. In addition to the Chainsmokers and Dua Lipa, Warren has collaborated with artists including Labrinth, Shawn Mendes, Rosé, Camila Cabello, Shakira, Noah Kahan and David Guetta.

== Early life and education ==
Warren was brought up in New York City, where she attended the preparatory school Trinity, from kindergarten through high school. From an early age, she had a penchant for the creative and performed regularly with her band, Emily Warren & the Betters (members Etienne Bowler and Marc Campbell went on to form part of the pop band MisterWives). A single from The Betters EP, Not at All, was featured on the soundtrack of MTV's short-lived series, Skins. She was accepted into the NYU Tisch School/Clive Davis Institute in 2011 and offered a songwriter's contract with Prescription (Rx) Songs in 2013. In 2015 Warren graduated from the university and began splitting her time between Los Angeles and London. She currently resides in Wilson, Wyoming and Los Angeles, California.

== Music career ==
=== Beginnings ===
After signing with Dr. Luke, Warren disbanded the Betters and spent a year in LA. Soon after her arrival, she co-wrote "Masterpiece", the third single on pop artist Jessie J's album, Sweet Talker. "Masterpiece" debuted at number 30 on the US Mainstream Top 40 and number 65 on the Billboard Hot 100, it was also certified gold in Australia and New Zealand. Following the success of that release, Warren eventually teamed up with longtime friend and collaborator Scott Harris to co-write four songs from Shawn Mendes' platinum-selling album, Handwritten: "Strings", "Aftertaste", "Air" and "Lost". September 18, 2015, marked the release of The Chainsmokers' and Tritonal's "Until You Were Gone", which featured Warren's lead vocals. Her performance was immediately praised by Nylon, which wrote: "Her delivery is filled with a longing that packs a strong punch." Additionally, The Chainsmokers hailed Warren as "one of the best songwriters and vocalists that they had ever worked with". Shortly after, Warren teamed up again with Scott Harris and together they wrote "Don't Let Me Down" with The Chainsmokers, which reached number 3 and went on to reach triple platinum in the United States. It was both The Chainsmokers and Daya's first top 5 on the Billboard Hot 100. "Don't Let Me Down" was also nominated and won a Grammy in 2017 for Best Dance Recording. Around the same time, Warren co-wrote and featured vocals on viral hit "Capsize" with Los Angeles duo Frenship, which is certified platinum and has surpassed 700 million streams on Spotify (115 million of which were acquired prior to its radio impact date).

When interviewed by the online music publication Smashed about her writing process, Warren stated: "I think that sometimes songwriting, especially for pop, is viewed as a factory or an assembly line process, and I have to challenge that... I think that good songwriting has a real art to it, and I don't just mean the profound or thought-provoking ones. Even most of the light-hearted, straight-up pop ones are masterfully written–sometimes even harder to write." Warren's express mission as a writer and artist is to create pop music that has the conceptual backing to influence positive social change. In a Tisch interview, she states: "What excites me about this field is that pop music can be an incredibly powerful and crucial platform for influence and change." She also has uncredited vocals on The Chainsmokers' track "Paris" from their debut album Memories... Do Not Open. She quotes "I think for the first song introducing their album, they just wanted it to be a Chainsmokers thing and not featuring anyone." The Chainsmokers felt it would be best to release it as a single without any features because it would promote their new album. Although she did not receive credit for the vocals she believed it all worked out and quotes: "It ended up kinda working out for the best 'cause there was all this mystery of who was singing it!". In 2019 Emily, along with her collaborators Ian Kirkpatrick (record producer) and Caroline Ailin wrote the hit Dua Lipa song Don't Start Now.

=== Artist ===
Warren's beginnings as an artist came with the release of American pop duo Frenship's single, "Capsize". Warren not only co-wrote the viral hit, but also performed as a featured vocalist. She made her first televised appearance performing "Capsize" with the duo on Jimmy Kimmel Live! on December 8, 2016.

On April 7, 2017, American electronic pop duo The Chainsmokers released their debut album, Memories...Do Not Open. Warren was credited as a writer on four songs, including "The One", "Don't Say", "My Type" and "Wake Up Alone". She was additionally featured as lead vocalist on "Don't Say" and "My Type" and provided uncredited backup vocals on "Paris". She was announced as a special guest on the duo's American "Memories...Do Not Open" tour and appeared with them for a performance of "Paris" on the April 8, 2017, episode of Saturday Night Live. The album debuted at #1 on the Billboard 200 Chart.

On May 5, 2017, Warren released her debut single, "Hurt By You", which landed on both the US Viral and Global Viral charts on Spotify. On July 21, 2017, Warren released her second single, "Something To Hold On To", which was also featured on Spotify's New Music Friday playlist. Her most recent single, "Poking Holes", was released on October 12, 2017.

On November 14, 2017, Warren was named as one of the Forbes 30 under 30 in the music industry. The list, according to Forbes, is an "annual encyclopedia of creative disruption featuring 600 stars from 20 different industries." Skylar Grey, one of the judges on the panel that selected Warren, said she was selected in part because, "Her sound and style of writing is so fresh, and I find a lot of other writers trying to emulate it. She's young, but she's been in the game for a while, so this isn't some flash-in-the-pan writer. I think she'll be killing it for a long time."

== Discography ==
=== Songwriting credits ===
Year	Artist	Album	Song	Co-written with
2026	Noga Erez	Duck Season	"People, I hope you know the world is ending."	Noga Erez, Ori Rousso, Johnny Goldstein
2026	Suki Waterhouse	Loveland	"Almost"	Alice Suki Waterhouse, Aaron Brooking Dessner
2026	ANOTR	Non-Album single	"Silver Lines" (feat. Emily Warren)	Jesse van der Heijden, Oguzhan Guney, Pablo Bowman, Kevin Theodore
2026	ANOTR	Withness	"Paradise"	Jesse van der Heijden, Oguzhan Guney, Phil Leigh
2026	Tori Kelly	God Must Really Love Me	"Smooth Landing"	Tori Kelly, Tommy King, Chloe George
2026	Noga Erez	Non-Album single	"Stuck in Heaven"	Noga Erez, Ori Rousso, Johnny Goldstein
2026	Labrinth	Cosmic Opera: Act I	"Debris"	Labrinth
2026	Labrinth	Cosmic Opera: Act I	"Still In Love With The Pain"	Labrinth
2025	Chris Lake	Chemistry	"Favorite One" with Black Lotus	Chris Lake, Dizzy Fae, Amir Izadkhah,
2024	Rosé	Rosie	"toxic till the end"	Chae Young Park, Evan Blair, Michael Pollack
2024	Rosé	Rosie	"call it the end"	Chae Young Park, Elof Loelv, Michael Pollack, Griff Clawson
2024	Ryan Castro, Ovy on the Drums	Non-Album single	"SQ(W Sound 04)"	Bryan Castro Sosa, Cristian Salazar, Daniel Echavarria Oviedo, Daniel Esteban Gutiérrez, Luis Fernando Villa
2024	Debbii Dawson,	Non-Album single	"Walla Walla"	Deborah Dawson, Alida Garpestad Peck, Zhone
2024	Noga Erez,	THE VANDALIST	"Mind Show"	Noga Erez, Ori Rousso, Antônio Carlos Jobim, Vinicius de Moraes
2024	Katy Perry,	143	"CRUSH"	Katy Perry, Łukasz Gottwald, Rocco Valdes, Ryan Ogren, Theron Thomas, Keegan Bach, Scott Harris, Sarah Hudson, Dallas Koehlke
2024	Katy Perry,	143	"NIRVANA"	Katy Perry, Łukasz Gottwald, Vaughn Oliver, Aaron Joseph, Rocco Valdes, Keegan Bach, Sarah Hudson, Dallas Koehlke, Ryan Ogren, Theron Thomas, Scott Harris
2024	Paris Hilton,	Infinite Icon	"If The Earth is Spinning" (Ft. Sia)	Alex Frankel, Deza, Ludvig Soderberg Paris Hilton, Sia, Jesse Shatkin
2024	The Chainsmokers	Non-Album single	"Don't Lie" Ft. Kim Petras	Andrew Taggart, Alex Pall, Ink, Kim Petras
2024	Sofi Tukker,	Bread	"Bread"	Sophie Hawley-Weld, Tucker Halpern, Scott Harris, Richard Beynon, Nicolas Sarazen, Peter Thomas
2024	Sofi Tukker,	Bread	"Hey Homie"	Sophie Hawley-Weld, Tucker Halpern, Scott Harris, Richard Beynon, Nicolas Sarazen, Peter Thomas, Marcio Arantes
2024	Sofi Tukker,	Bread	"Spiral"	Sophie Hawley-Weld, Tucker Halpern, Scott Harris, Richard Beynon, Marcio Arantes, Laryssa Goulart Loureiro, Nicholas Sarazen, Peter Thomas
2024	Sofi Tukker,	Bread	"Throw Some Ass"	Sophie Hawley-Weld, Tucker Halpern, Scott Harris, Richard Beynon, Marcio Arantes, Laryssa Goulart Loureiro, Nicholas Sarazen, Peter Thomas
2024	Villano Antillano	Miss Misogyny	"Vicio" Ft. Mala Rodríguez	Villana Santiago Pacheco, María Rodríguez Garrido, DallasK, Mr. NaisGuy
2024	Jamie Fine	if this is it... - E.P.	"Groceries"	Richard Beynon, Scott Harris
2024	Meghan Trainor,	Timeless	"Crowded Room"	Federico Vindver, Meghan Trainor
2024	Meghan Trainor,	Timeless	"Booty" (feat. Paul Russell)	Federico Vindver, Meghan Trainor, Paul Russell, Ryan Trainor
2024	Sad Night Dynamite	Who Do You Think You Are?	"Who Do You Think You Are?"	Archie Blagden, Ben Ash, Joshua Greacen, Kareen Lomax, McClenney, Om'Mas Keith
2024	The Chainsmokers	No Hard Feelings	"No Shade at Pitti"	Drew Taggart, Alex Pall, Megan Bülow Ryan Raines
2024	The Chainsmokers	No Hard Feelings	"Tennis Court"	Drew Taggart, Alex Pall, Lucas Taggart
2024	Dua Lipa	Radical Optimism	"Falling Forever"	Dua Lipa, Ali Tamposi, Caroline Ailin, Danny L Harle, Ian Kirkpatrick
2024	MacKenzie Porter	Nobody's Born with a Broken Heart	"Easy to Miss"	Hillary Lindsey, Will Weatherly
2023	Sofi Tukker,	Non-Album single	"Veneno" (with Mari Merenda, Sophia Ardessore)	Scott Harris, Richard Beynon, Ronaldo Dos Santo Silva, Sophie Hawley-Weld, Tucker Halpern
2023	Steve Aoki, Paris Hilton	Non-Album single	"Lighter"	Scott Harris, Mac & Phil, Jonah Shy
2023	Trolls	Trolls Band Together (Original Motion Picture Soundtrack)	"Perfect" (with Justin Timberlake, Daveed Diggs, Eric Andre, Kid Cudi and Troye Sivan)	Justin Timberlake, Michael Pollack Mike Elizondo
2023	Trolls	Trolls Band Together (Original Motion Picture Soundtrack)	"Watch Me Work" (with Andrew Rannells and Brianna Mazzola)	Justin Timberlake, Michael Pollack Mike Elizondo
2023	Trolls	Trolls Band Together (Original Motion Picture Soundtrack)	"It Takes Two" (with Camila Cabello, Anna Kendrick, Justin Timberlake, Daveed Diggs, Eric Andre and Kid Cudi	Justin Timberlake, Michael Pollack Mike Elizondo
2023	Trolls	Trolls Band Together (Original Motion Picture Soundtrack)	"Family" (with Camila Cabello, Anna Kendrick, Justin Timberlake, Daveed Diggs, Eric Andre, Kid Cudi and Troye Sivan)	Justin Timberlake, Michael Pollack Mike Elizondo
2023	Trolls	Trolls Band Together (Original Motion Picture Soundtrack)	"Family - Demo" (with Justin Timberlake and Emily Warren)	Justin Timberlake, Michael Pollack Mike Elizondo
2023	Maddie Zahm	Now That I've Been Honest	"Dani"	Maddie Zahm, Bethany Warner, Adam Yaron,
2023	The Chainsmokers	TBA	"Up & Down" (featuring 347aidan)	aidan fuller, Andrew Taggart, Alex Pall, Ethan Snorek, Nick Long, Ian Kirkpatrick
2022	Kygo	Thrill of the Chase	"How Many Tears" (with Sam Feldt featuring Emily Warren)	Max Wolfgang, Daniel Mirza, Kyrre Gørvell-Dahll, Sam Feldt
2022	Olivia O'Brien	Non-Album single	"Never Be The One"	Olivia O'Brien, Nick Ruth, Deza
2022	Adam Melchor	Here Goes Nothing!	"Turnham Green"	Adam Melchor
2022	Lizzo	Special	"Naked"	Lizzo, Andrew "Pop" Wansel, Ian Kirkpatrick, Daoud Anthony, Ricky Reed, Alton Taylor, Rob Mickens, Robert Bell, Dennis Thomas, Richard Westfield, Clayde Smith, George Brown, Ronald Bell
2022	Mabel	About Last Night...	"I Love Your Girl"	Ilya Salmanzadeh, Rami Yacoub, Mabel, Aldae, Oscar Gorres
2022	The Chainsmokers	So Far So Good (+ The Fall)	"The Fall"	Alex Pall, Drew Taggart, Collin Maguire, Ian Kirkpatrick, Tillis James Churchill III
2022	Sean Paul	Scorcha	"Light My Fire" feat. Gwen Stefani & Shenseea	Rosina Russell, Allan Peter Grigg, Chinsea Lee, Gamal Kosh Lewis, Saul Alexander Castillo Vasquez, Sean Paul Henriques
2022	The Chainsmokers	So Far So Good	"Riptide"	Alex Pall, Ian Kirkpatrick, Drew Taggart, Chris Martin, Whethan
2022	The Chainsmokers	So Far So Good	"Maradona"	Alex Pall, Ian Kirkpatrick, Drew Taggart, Ethan Snorek, Isaac Freeman III
2022	The Chainsmokers	So Far So Good	"Solo Mission"	Alex Pall, Ian Kirkpatrick, Drew Taggart
2022	The Chainsmokers	So Far So Good	"Something Different"	Alex Pall, Ian Kirkpatrick, Drew Taggart, Whethan, Gregory Heinn
2022	The Chainsmokers	So Far So Good	"Channel 1"	Alex Pall, Ian Kirkpatrick, Drew Taggart, Whethan
2022	The Chainsmokers	So Far So Good	"I Hope You Change Your Mind"	Alex Pall, Drew Taggart, Ian Kirkpatrick
2022	The Chainsmokers	So Far So Good	"Cyanide"	Alex Pall, Drew Taggart, Ian Kirkpatrick
2022	Martin Garrix & Zedd	Sentio	"Follow"	Caroline Ailin, Martin Garrix, Oskar Rindborg, Zedd
2022	Sigrid	How To Let Go	"Mistake Like You"	Sigrid, Martin Sjølie
2022	Sigrid	How To Let Go	"It Gets Dark"	Sigrid Solbakk Raabe, Sylvester Willy Sivertsen
2021	Sigrid	How To Let Go	"Mirror"	Sigrid, Caroline Ailin, Sylvester Willy Sivertsen
2021	Noah Kahan	I Was/I Am	"Hollow"	Noah Kahan, Stephen Kozmeniuk
2021	Illenium & Tori Kelly	Fallen Embers	"Blame Myself"	Nicholas Miller, Steve Booker
2021	Shakira	TBA	"Don't Wait Up"	Ian Kirkpatrick, Shakira
2021	Zara Larsson	Poster Girl	"Morning"	Caroline Ailin, Al Shux
2021	Dua Lipa	Future Nostalgia: The Moonlight Edition	"We're Good"	Scott Harris, Sly
2021	Astrid S	Leave It Beautiful	"Leave It Beautiful"	Astrid Smeplass, Jakob Hazell, Svante Halldin, Ludvig Soderberg
2020	Adam Melchor	Two Songs for Now	"Last Song on Earth" feat. Emily Warren	Adam Melchor
2020	Fletcher	The S(ex) Tapes	"Silence"	Cari Fletcher, Malay Ho, Caroline Ailin
2020	Phoebe Ryan	How it Used to Feel	"Exist"	Phoebe Ryan, Leroy Clampitt
2020	Lennon Stella	Three. Two. One	"Weakness (Huey Lewis)" feat. Maisy Stella	Erin McCarley, Eg White, Lennon Stella, Sam De Jong
2020	Lennon Stella	Three. Two. One	"Fear of Being Alone"	Caroline Ailin, Malay Ho, Paul Shelton
2019	Dua Lipa	Future Nostalgia	"Don't Start Now"	Dua Lipa, Caroline Furoyen, Ian Kirkpatrick
2019	Melanie Martinez	K-12	"Wheels on the Bus"	Melanie Martinez, Michael Keenan
2019	Melanie Martinez	K-12	"Strawberry Shortcake"	Melanie Martinez, Michael Keenan
2019	Melanie Martinez	K-12	"Recess"	Melanie Martinez, Michael Keenan
2019	RITUAL	TBA	"Using" feat. Emily Warren	Adam Midgley, Tommy Baxter, Gerrard O'Connel
2019	Basic Tape	Non-Album single	"Sweet Talk"	Benjamin Emard, Savinien Milot
2019	Vanic	Non-Album single	"Somedays"	Britt Burton, Jesse Hughes, Kevin Pederson, Matthew Elifritz, Trevor Dahl
2019	X Ambassadors	ORION	"Shadows"	Adam Levin, Casey Harris, Sam Harris, Eric Frederic, Jason DeZuzio
2019	Phil Plested	TBA	"Either You Love Me or You Don't"	Phil Plested, Matthew Holmes, Philip Leigh, Thomas Eriksen
2019	Khalid	Free Spirit	"Twenty One"	Khalid Robinson, Jamil Chammas, Ryan Vojtesak, Charlie Handsome, Digi
2019	Khalid	Free Spirit	"Alive"	Khalid Robinson, John Hill, John Blanda, Jonathan Hoskins
2019	MacKenzie Porter	Non-Album single	"Cry Baby"	Lily Ava Stokes, Steph Jones, Will Lobban-Bean,
2019	Sigrid	Sucker Punch	"Sucker Punch"	Sigrid Solbakk Raabe, Martin Sjølie, Odd Martin Skalnes
2019	Sigrid	Sucker Punch	"Mine Right Now"	Sigrid Solbakk Raabe, Martin Sjølie, Odd Martin Skalnes
2019	Sigrid	Sucker Punch	"Don't Feel Like Crying"	Sigrid Solbakk Raabe, Oscar Holter
2019	Sigrid	Sucker Punch	"Level Up"	Sigrid Solbakk Raabe, Martin Sjølie, Odd Martin Skalnes
2019	Matt Simons	TBA	"Open Up"	Matt Simons, Scott Harris, Dan Romer,
2019	Backstreet Boys	DNA (Backstreet Boys album)	"Nobody Else"	Ari Leff, Gamal Lewis, Ryan Ogren, Nick Bailey
2019	RITUAL	TBA	"Love Me Back" feat. Tove Styrke	Adam Midgley, Cole Steven, Gerard O'Connell, Linden Jay, Milo Bennett, Tommy Baxter
2019	Macy Maloy	Studio Sessions	"Wrong Things Right"	Macy Maloy, Dem Jointz
2018	Clean Bandit	What Is Love?	"Last Goodbye" feat. Tove Styrke and Stefflon Don	Jack Patterson, Grace Chatto, Ilya Salmanzadeh, Stephanie Allen
2018	Rita Ora	Phoenix	"Only Want You"	Alexandra Tamposi, Andrew Wotman, Louis Bell
2018	Brett Young	Ticket to L.A.	"Reason to Stay"	Brett Young, Jonathan Nite, Jimmy Robbins
2018	Professor Green	TBA	"Photographs" with Rag'n'Bone Man	Stephen Manderson, Chris Crowhurst, Rory Charles Graham, Fraser T. Smith, TMS (production team), Manon Grandjean
2018	Sigrid	Sucker Punch	"Sucker Punch"	Sigrid Raabe, Martin Sjølie
2018	LANY	Malibu Nights	"If You See Her"	Paul Klein, David Pramik
2018	The Chainsmokers	Sick Boy	"This Feeling" feat. Kelsea Ballerini	Drew Taggart, Alex Pall
2018	David Guetta	7	"Say My Name" with Bebe Rexha and J Balvin	Pierre Guetta, Giorgio Tuinfort, Alejandro Ramierz, Brittany Burton, Matthew Holmes, Philip Leigh, Thomas Troelsen, Jose Balvin, Baoz de Jong
2018	The Chainsmokers	Sick Boy	"Side Effects" feat. Emily Warren	Sly, Corey Sanders, Drew Taggart, Tony Ann
2018	Chelsea Jade	Personal Best	"Pitch Dark"	Sam de Jong, Ecca Vandal
2018	Galantis	TBA	"Satisfied" feat. MAX	Christian Karlsson, Linus Eklow, Jimmy "Svidden" Koitzsch, Henrik Jonback, Joshua Coleman, Joseph Spargur, Scott Harris, Maxwell Schneider
2018	Theia	Non-Album single	"Bad Idea"	Emma Haley Walker, Jacob Zachary Grant, Sukhdeep Singh Bhogal
2018	Bebe Rexha	Expectations	"Don't Get Any Closer"	Bleta Rexha, Jussi Karvinen, Scott Harris
2018	Taeyeon	Something New	"Baram X3"	Karen Poole, Sonny J Mason
2018	Jason Mraz	Know.	"Unlonely"	Jason Mraz, Scott Harris, Andrew Wells
2018	Era Istrefi	TBA	"Prisoner"	Scott Harris, Maor Levi
2018	Anne-Marie	Speak Your Mind	"Trigger"	Scott Harris, Chris Loco
2018	JT Roach	Non-Album single	"Symmetry" feat. Emily Warren	JT Roach
2018	The Chainsmokers	Sick Boy	"Somebody" feat. Drew Love	Drew Taggart, Drew Love
2018	Sigrid	Raw EP	"High Five"	Sigrid Solbakk Raabe, Martin Sjølie
2018	Matt Simons	TBA	"We Can Do Better"	Matt Simons, Scott Harris, Dan Romer, Mike Tuccillo
2018	The Chainsmokers	Sick Boy	"Everybody Hates Me"	Drew Taggart
2018	The Chainsmokers	Sick Boy	"You Owe Me"	Drew Taggart, Alex Pall, Chelsea Jade
2018	Sean Paul & David Guetta	Mad Love the Prequel	"Mad Love" feat. Becky G	Sean Paul, David Guetta, Shakira, Raoul Chen, Ina Wroldsen, Giorgio Tuinfort, Rosina Russell, Jack Patterson, 1st Klase, Banx & Ranx, Jason Henriques
2018	Josie Dunne	Non-Album single	"Old School"	Josie Dunne, Ryan Ogren, Nick Bailey
2018	The Chainsmokers	Sick Boy	"Sick Boy"	Drew Taggart, Alex Pall, Tony Ann
2017	Jacob Sartorius	Non-Album singles	"Cozy"	The Futuristics, Steph Jones
2017	Frank Walker	Non-Album singles	"Piano" feat. Emily Warren	Andrew Jackson, Fred Ball (producer)
2017	Filous	For Love EP	"Already Gone" feat. Emily Warren	Scott Harris, Matthias Oldofredi
2017	Rationale	Rationale	"Into the Blue"	Tinashe Fazakerley, Mark Crew
2017	Charli XCX	TBA	"Boys"	Ingrid Andress, Cass Lowe, Michael Pollack, Ari Leff, Jerker Hansson
2017	Mitch James	Non-Album singles	"All the Ways to Say Goodbye"	Mitch James, Nik Brinkman, Sam de Jong
2017	Audien, 3lau	Non-Album singles	"Hot Water" feat. Victoria Zaro	Scott Harris, Jasmine Thompson, Ido Zmishlany
2017	Dua Lipa	Dua Lipa	"New Rules"	Ian Kirkpatrick, Caroline Ailin
2017	COIN	How Will You Know If You Never Try	"Are We Alone"	Chase Lawrence, Joe Memmel, Ryan, Zach
2017	COIN	How Will You Know If You Never Try	"I Don't Wanna Dance"	Chase Lawrence, Joe Memmel, Teddy Geiger
2017	Alessia Cara	The Get Down Part II Soundtrack	"The Other Side" (Alessia Cara Version)	Scott Harris
2017	Noah Cyrus	Non-Album single	"Stay Together"	Britt Burton, Digital Farm Animals
2017	The Chainsmokers	Memories...Do Not Open	"The One"	Scott Harris, Drew Taggart
2017	The Chainsmokers	Memories...Do Not Open	"Don't Say" feat. Emily Warren	Drew Taggart, Imad Royal, Joni Fatora, Brenton Duvall
2017	The Chainsmokers	Memories...Do Not Open	"My Type" feat. Emily Warren	Britt Burton, Drew Taggart
2017	The Chainsmokers	Memories...Do Not Open	"Wake Up Alone" feat. Jhené Aiko	Scott Harris, Drew Taggart
2017	James Blunt	The Afterlove	"Someone Singing Along"	James Blunt, Steve Robson
2017	Little Mix	Glory Days: Platinum Edition	"No More Sad Songs" feat. Machine Gun Kelly	The Electric, Tash Phillips
2016	Molly Kate Kestner	Non-Album singles	"Good Die Young"	Molly Kate Kestner, Nick Ruth
2016	Naughty Boy	Bungee Jumping	"Should've Been Me" feat. Kyla and Popcaan	James Murray, Shahid Khan, Mustafa Omer, Scott Harris, Kyla Reid, Andrae Sutherland
2016	Sean Paul	Mad Love the Prequel Dua Lipa: Complete Edition	"No Lie" feat. Dua Lipa	Sean Paul, Andrew Jackson, Pip Kembo, Sermstyle
2016	Little Mix	Glory Days	"Nobody Like You"	Steve Robson
2016	Little Mix	Glory Days	"No More Sad Songs"	The Electric, Tash Phillips
2016	Lost Kings	Non-Album single	"Phone Down" feat. Emily Warren	Scott Harris, Phil Leigh, Matt Holmes, Norris Shanholtz, Robert Gainley
2016	Britt Nicole	Britt Nicole	"No Filter"	Britt Burton, Josh Alexander
2016	Ava Lily	Non-Album single	"Painkiller"	Lily Stokes, Shama Joseph
2016	Various Artists	The Get Down Soundtrack	"Just You, Not Now (Love Theme)" by Grace	Grace, Emile Haynie, Baz Luhrmann
2016	Chris Lane	Girl Problems	"Circles" feat. Mackenzie Porter	Danny Parker, Steph Jones, Joey Moi, Sno
2016	Astrid S	Astrid S	"Jump"	Astrid S, Nick Ruth
2016	Astrid S	Astrid S	"I Don't Wanna Know"	Astrid S, Nick Ruth
2016	Andy Black	The Shadow Side	"Put The Gun Down"	Andy Biersack, John Feldmann
2016	Becky Hill	Non-Album single	"Back To My Love" feat. Little Simz	Becky Hill, Little Simz, Noah Breakfast
2016	Frenship	Truce	"Capsize" feat. Emily Warren	James Sunderland, Brett Hite, Babydaddy
2016	Skizzy Mars	Alone Together	"Girl on a Train"	Skizzy Mars, Scott Harris, Michael Keenan
2016	The Chainsmokers	Collage (EP)	"Don't Let Me Down" feat. Daya	Drew Taggart, Scott Harris
2016	Tiësto, Oliver Heldens	Non-Album single	"The Right Song" feat. Natalie La Rose	Scott Harris, Tiësto, Oliver Heldens
2015	5 Seconds of Summer	Sounds Good Feels Good	"Safety Pin"	John Feldmann, Luke Hemmings, Michael Clifford, Calum Hood, Ashton Irwin
2015	OMI	Me 4 U	"Drop in the Ocean" feat. AronChupa	Scott Harris, Oscar Scivier, AronChupa
2015	The Chainsmokers, Tritonal	Bouquet	"Until You Were Gone"	The YoungBoyz, The Chainsmokers, Tritonal, Jared Scharff
2015	Becky G	Non-Album single	"Break a Sweat"	Dr. Luke, Cirkut, J Kash, LunchMoney Lewis, Chloe Angelides
2015	Sophia Black	Sophia Black	"mizu"	Sophia Black, Aaron Joseph, Jon Castelli
2015	Melanie Martinez	Cry Baby	"Soap"	Melanie Martinez, Kyle Shearer
2015	Shawn Mendes	Handwritten	"Strings"	Shawn Mendes, Scott Harris
2015	Shawn Mendes	Handwritten	"Aftertaste"	Shawn Mendes, Scott Harris
2015	Shawn Mendes	Handwritten	"Air" feat. Astrid S	Scott Harris
2015	Shawn Mendes	Handwritten	"Lost"	Shawn Mendes, Scott Harris, Joshua Grant
2015	Katy Tiz	Non-Album single	"Whistle (While You Work It)"	Katy Tiz, Kinetics & One Love, J.R. Rotem
2015	Sleeping with Sirens	Madness	"Gold"	John Feldmann, Kellin Quinn
2015	Sleeping with Sirens	Madness	"Heroine"	John Feldmann, Kellin Quinn
2015	Fifth Harmony	Reflection	"Them Girls Be Like"	Britt Burton, James Abrahart, Victoria Monet, T-Collar
2014	Niykee Heaton	Bad Intentions	"Sober"	Niykee Heaton, Michael Keenan
2014	Niykee Heaton	Bad Intentions	"Champagne"	Niykee Heaton, Nick Bailey, Ryan Ogren
2014	Niykee Heaton	Bad Intentions	"Skin Tight"	Niykee Heaton, Tommy Tysper
2014	Niykee Heaton	Bad Intentions	"Villa"	Niykee Heaton, Scott Harris, Keenan, SmarterChild
2014	Nick & Knight	Nick & Knight	"If You Want It"	Nick Carter, Jordan Knight, Who is Fancy, Jeff Halatrax
2014	Jessie J	Sweet Talker	"Masterpiece"	Britt Burton, Josh Alexander
2014	Jessie J	Sweet Talker	"Ain't Been Done"	Scott Harris, David Gamson
2014	Karmin	Pulses	"Gasoline"	Amy Heidemann, Nick Noonan, Kyle Shearer
2013	Krewella	Get Wet	"Pass the Love Around"	Scott Harris, SmarterChild

=== Studio albums ===
Quiet Your Mind
No.	Title	Writer(s)	Producer(s)	Length
1.	"How It Ends"	Emily Schwartz; Matthew Holmes; Philip Leigh	Mac & Phil	3:36
2.	"The Point"	Schwartz; Holmes; Leigh	Mac & Phil; Sam de Jong	3:18
3.	"Say It"	Schwartz; Holmes; Leigh	Mac & Phil; Nick Ruth	2:44
4.	"Poking Holes"	Schwartz; Scott Friedman; Nicholas Ruth	Ruth	3:50
5.	"Something to Hold On To"	Schwartz; Holmes; Leigh	Mac & Phil	3:38
6.	"Just Click"	Schwartz; Friedman; Jesse Shatkin	Shatkin	3:39
7.	"As Long as I'm Alive"	Schwartz; Friedman; Holmes; Leigh	Mac & Phil	2:52
8.	"Like That"	Schwartz; Brittany Burton; Friedman; Holmes; Leigh	Mac & Phil	3:17
9.	"Paranoid"	Schwartz; Burton; Friedman; Ruth; Holmes; Leigh	Ruth; Mac & Phil	3:21
10.	"Hurt By You"	Schwartz; Friedman; Ruth	Ruth	3:07
11.	"Not Ready to Dance"	Schwartz; Friedman	Scott Harris	3:01
Total length:				36:23

=== Singles ===
==== As lead artist ====
List of singles as lead artist, with selected chart positions, showing year released and album name
Title	Year	Peak chart positions						Certifications	Album
Title	Year	US	AUS	CAN	NOR	SWE	UK	Certifications	Album
"Capsize" (with Frenship)	2016	78	17	56	11	20	59	RIAA: Platinum; ARIA: 3× Platinum; MC: 2× Platinum; GLF: Platinum; BPI: Silver	Truce
"Hurt By You"	2017	—	—	—	—	—	—		Quiet Your Mind
"Something to Hold on To"	2017	—	—	—	—	—	—		Quiet Your Mind
"Poking Holes"	2017	—	—	—	—	—	—		Quiet Your Mind
"Paranoid"	2018	—	—	—	—	—	—		Quiet Your Mind
"—" denotes a recording that did not chart or was not released in that territory.

==== As featured artist ====
List of singles, with selected chart positions and certifications, showing year released and album name
Title	Year	Peak chart positions						Certifications	Album
Title	Year	US	US Dance	AUS	CAN	SWE	UK	Certifications	Album
"Until You Were Gone" (The Chainsmokers and Tritonal featuring Emily Warren)	2015	—	21	—	—	—	—	RIAA: Gold; MC: Gold	Bouquet
"Phone Down" (Lost Kings featuring Emily Warren)	2016	—	25	—	—	—	—		Non-album single
"Side Effects" (The Chainsmokers featuring Emily Warren)	2018	66	7	61	39	100	50	RIAA: Gold; ARIA: Gold; MC: Gold	Sick Boy
"Using" (Ritual featuring Emily Warren)	2019	—	—	—	—	—	—		Non-album single
"—" denotes a recording that did not chart or was not released in that territory.

=== Other charted songs ===
List of other charted songs, with selected chart positions, showing year released and album name
Title	Year	Peak chart positions			Certifications	Album
Title	Year	US Bub.	US Dance	CAN	Certifications	Album
"My Type" (The Chainsmokers featuring Emily Warren)	2017	17	14	66	RIAA: Gold	Memories...Do Not Open
"Don't Say" (The Chainsmokers featuring Emily Warren)	2017	—	19	63		Memories...Do Not Open
"—" denotes a recording that did not chart or was not released in that territory.
