= Until You Were Gone =

Until You Were Gone may refer to:

- Until You Were Gone (Chipmunk song), 2010
- Until You Were Gone (The Chainsmokers and Tritonal song), 2015
