= Capsize (disambiguation) =

Capsize means to turn over a boat or ship.

Capsize or Capsized may also refer to:

- "Capsize" (song), by Frenship, 2016
- Capsize (knot), to change its form and rearrange its parts
- Capsized!, a 2011 album by Circus Devils
- Capsized (video game), a 2011 science fiction-themed platform game
- "Capsized", a song from the 2016 Andrew Bird album Are You Serious
- Capsize Glacier, Antarctica
- Capsize (band), an American hardcore band

== See also ==
- Capesize ships, the largest dry cargo ships
- Turtling (sailing)
