= Bouquet (EP) =

EP by The Chainsmokers
- Released: October 23, 2015
- Genre: Electronic; pop; EDM
- Length: 18:08
- Label: Disruptor; Columbia
- Producer: The Chainsmokers; Tritonal

The Chainsmokers chronology
Bouquet (2015)	Collage (2016)

Singles from Bouquet
- 1. "Good Intentions" Released: May 18, 2015; 2. "Roses" Released: June 16, 2015; 3. "Waterbed" Released: July 17, 2015; 4. "Until You Were Gone" Released: September 18, 2015; 5. "New York City" Released: October 30, 2015

Professional ratings
Review scores
Source	Rating
AllMusic	3.5/5 stars

Bouquet is the debut extended play (EP) by American DJ duo The Chainsmokers. It was released on October 23, 2015, through Disruptor Records and Columbia Records.

== Track listing ==
Bouquet track listing
No.	Title	Writer(s)	Producer(s)	Length
1.	"Roses" (featuring Rozes)	Andrew Taggart; Elizabeth Mencel	The Chainsmokers	3:46
2.	"New York City"	Taggart; Brittany Amaradio	The Chainsmokers	3:50
3.	"Until You Were Gone" (with Tritonal featuring Emily Warren)	Taggart; Emily Warren; Chad Cisneros; Dave Reed; Curtis Troy Austin; Jared Scharff; Andrew Williams	The Chainsmokers; Tritonal	3:37
4.	"Waterbed" (featuring Waterbed)	Taggart; Chad Montermini; Cat Paternostro	The Chainsmokers	3:29
5.	"Good Intentions" (featuring BullySongs)	Taggart; Andrew Bullimore; Jack McManus	The Chainsmokers	3:27
Total length:				18:08

Vinyl edition bonus track
No.	Title	Length
6.	"Roses" (featuring Rozes; Telykast x Sokko & Lyons Remix)	3:52

Japanese special edition bonus tracks
No.	Title	Writer(s)	Length
6.	"Don't Let Me Down" (featuring Daya)	Taggart; Warren; Scott Harris	3:28
7.	"Don't Let Me Down" (featuring Daya; Hardwell x Sephyx Remix)	Taggart; Warren; Harris	2:42

== Charts ==
=== Weekly charts ===
Chart (2015–16)	Peak position
Canadian Albums (Billboard)	18
US Billboard 200	31
US Top Dance/Electronic Albums (Billboard)	2
US Heatseekers Albums (Billboard)	4

=== Year-end charts ===
Chart (2016)	Position
US Billboard 200	75
US Top Dance/Electronic Albums (Billboard)	3

Chart (2017)	Position
US Top Dance/Electronic Albums (Billboard)	13

== Certifications ==
Region	Certification	Certified units/sales
United States (RIAA)	Gold	500,000^{‡}
^{‡} Sales+streaming figures based on certification alone.
