= New York City (The Chainsmokers song) =

Single by The Chainsmokers

from the EP Bouquet
- Released: October 23, 2015
- Recorded: 2015
- Length: 3:50
- Label: Disruptor; Columbia
- Songwriters: Andrew Taggart; Brittany "Delacey" Amaradio
- Producer: The Chainsmokers

The Chainsmokers singles chronology
"Until You Were Gone" (2015)	"New York City" (2015)	"Don't Let Me Down" (2016)

"New York City" is a song by American DJ duo The Chainsmokers from the duo's first EP Bouquet. It features uncredited vocals from American singer Victoria Zaro. The song peaked at number 25 on the US Dance/Electronic Songs chart and number 80 on the 2016 Dance/Electronic Songs year-end chart. The chorus is interpolated in Fivio Foreign's single "City of Gods".

== Charts ==
=== Weekly charts ===
Chart (2015–16)	Peak position
US Hot Dance/Electronic Songs (Billboard)	25

=== Year-end charts ===
Chart (2016)	Position
US Hot Dance/Electronic Songs (Billboard)	80

== Certifications ==
Region	Certification	Certified units/sales
United States (RIAA)	Gold	500,000^{‡}
^{‡} Sales+streaming figures based on certification alone.

== Release history ==
Region	Date	Format	Label	Ref.
Various	October 23, 2015	Digital download	Disruptor; Columbia	
United States	October 30, 2015	Top 40 radio	Disruptor; Columbia	
