= LUXE =

Compilation album by Williams Street Records (various artists)
- Released: May 10, 2017
- Genre: Dream pop; electropop; chillwave; electro-soul
- Length: 57:28
- Label: Adult Swim/Williams Street Records
- Producer: Shannon McKnight (of Adult Swim)

Adult Swim Music chronology
N O I S E (2016)	LUXE (2017)	Adult Swim Singles Program 2017/2018 (2018)

LUXE is an electro soul and dream pop compilation released via Cartoon Network's Adult Swim. The program was announced on May 3, 2017, with the lead single "One Thing" by Tei Shi. Curated by Adult Swim staff member, Shannon McKnight, the compilation of 15 tracks was released in-full on May 10, 2017.

== Track listing ==
Source
No.	Title	Artist
1	"Theme for a Dream (Pt. 1&2)	Neon Indian
2	"Wave is Not the Water"	Wye Oak
3	"Blue Paradise"	Paloma
4	"Endlessness"	Deep Shoq
5	"Predicament"	KLLO
6	"What We Gonna Do"	SassyBlack
7	"Only If U Knew"	Starchild & The New Romantic
8	"One Thing"	Tei Shi
9	"Cruel World"	Active Child
10	"Cover You"	FEATHERS
11	"You Deserve This"	Men I Trust
12	"Saint Marie"	High Highs
13	"Elsa from Rialto"	The Mountain Goats
14	"Frozen Lake"	Múm
15	"Spring"	Toro y Moi
