= Phone Down (Lost Kings song) =

Single by Lost Kings featuring Emily Warren
- Released: October 7, 2016
- Recorded: 2016
- Genre: Future bass
- Length: 3:35
- Label: RCA Records; Disruptor Records
- Songwriters: Matthew Thomas; Emily Warren; Scott Harris; Paul Holmes; Robert Abisi; Philip Anthony Leigh; Norris Shanholtz
- Producer: Lost Kings

Lost Kings singles chronology
"Something Good" (2016)	"Phone Down" (2016)	"Quit You" (2017)

Emily Warren singles chronology
"Capsize" (2016)	"Phone Down" (2016)	"Hurt By You" (2017)

"Phone Down" is a song recorded by American DJs Lost Kings featuring American singer Emily Warren. It was released as a single on October 7, 2016, via Disruptor Records and RCA Records.

== Charts ==
=== Weekly charts ===
Chart (2016–2017)	Peak position
US Hot Dance/Electronic Songs (Billboard)	25

=== Year-end charts ===
Chart (2017)	Peak position
US Hot Dance/Electronic Songs (Billboard)	95

== Certifications ==
Region	Certification	Certified units/sales
Canada (Music Canada)	Gold	40,000^{‡}
New Zealand (RMNZ)	Gold	15,000^{‡}
United States (RIAA)	Gold	500,000^{‡}
^{‡} Sales+streaming figures based on certification alone.
