= Brock Phillips =

Canadian country music singer and songwriter

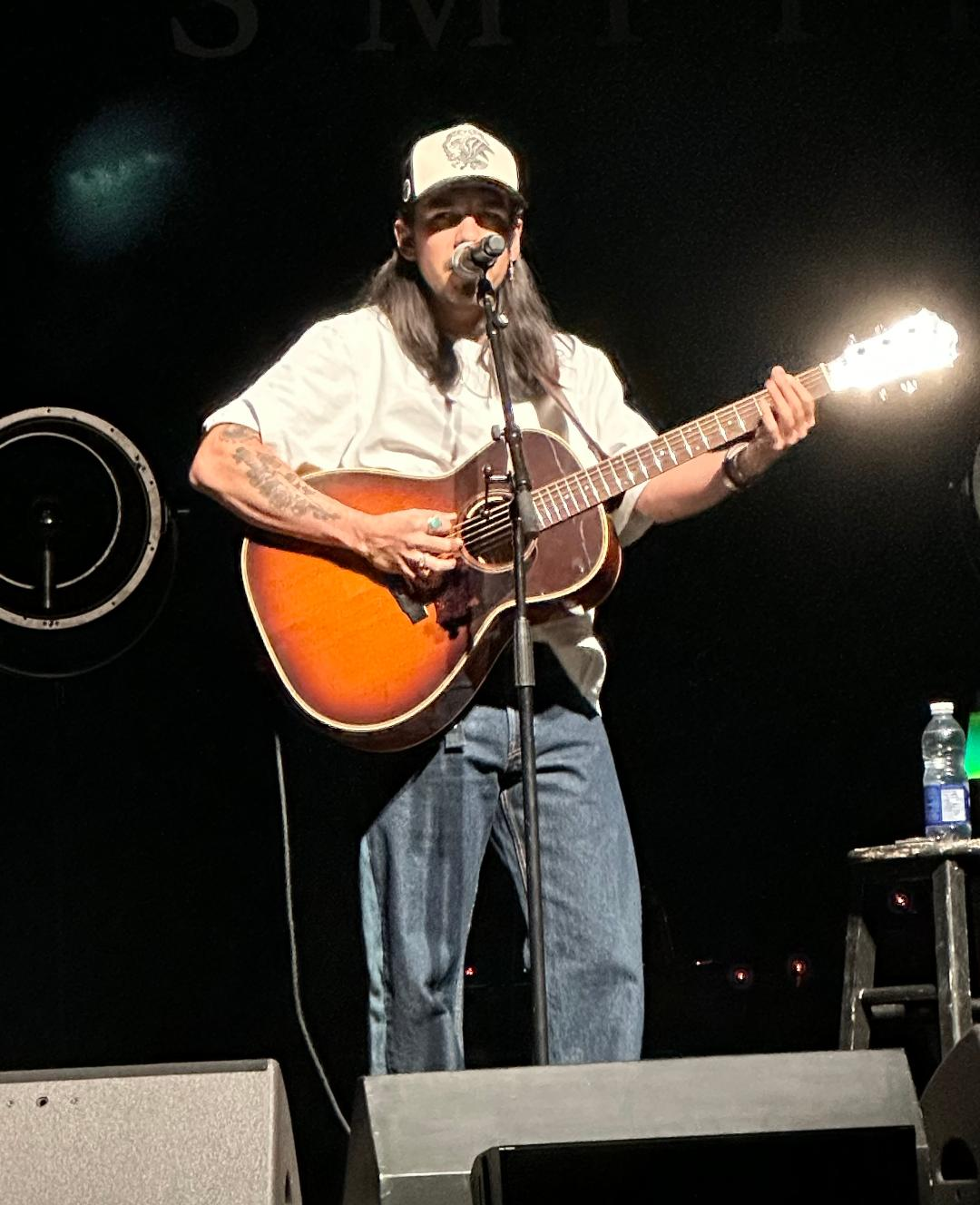
- Phillips performing at the Pickering Casino Resort in Ontario in December 2025

Background information
- Origin: Langley, British Columbia, Canada
- Genre: Country
- Occupations: Singer, songwriter
- Instruments: Guitar, vocals
- Years active: 2021-present
- Labels: Local Hay; Big Loud

Brock Phillips is a Canadian country music singer-songwriter from Langley, British Columbia. He is currently signed to Local Hay Records. His debut single "Something Else" charted in the top fifteen of the Billboard Canada Country chart.

== Biography ==
Phillips was born in raised in the Vancouver area, where he attended the Langley Fine Arts School. After graduating high school there, he attended the Berklee College of Music in Massachusetts. While at Berklee, he began writing his own songs, taking inspiration from artists such as Chris Stapleton, John Mayer, and Kings of Leon. After completing his degree, he returned to Vancouver and began performing at weekly residencies and opening for larger Canadian country artists. In 2024, Phillips signed a publishing deal with Big Loud and Local Hay, and moved to Nashville, Tennessee. In 2025, he released his debut single "Something Else" via Local Hay Records. In late 2025, Phillips was the opening act on Dallas Smith's Unplugged Tour across Canada. In May 2026, Phillips officially signed a record deal with Big Loud and Local Hay, and released the song "Rich Man".

== Discography ==
=== Singles ===
Title	Year	Peak chart positions	Album
Title	Year	CAN Country	Album
"Something Else"	2025	4	TBA
"Rich Man"	2026	49	TBA
"Leave Me Like a Backroad" (with Dallas Smith)	2026	58	TBA

=== Music videos ===
Title	Year	Director
"Something Else"	2025	Brandon Ferguson
