= Roses (The Chainsmokers song) =

2015 single by The Chainsmokers featuring Rozes

Single by the Chainsmokers featuring Rozes

from the EP Bouquet
- Released: June 16, 2015
- Recorded: 2014–2015
- Genre: Dance-pop; future bass
- Length: 3:46 (album version); 3:07 (radio edit)
- Label: Disruptor; Columbia; Sony
- Songwriters: Andrew Taggart; Elizabeth Mencel
- Producer: The Chainsmokers

The Chainsmokers singles chronology
"Good Intentions" (2015)	"Roses" (2015)	"Waterbed" (2015)

Rozes singles chronology
"Limelight" (2014)	"Roses" (2015)	"R U Mine" (2015)

Music video
- "Roses" on YouTube

"Roses" is a song by American DJ duo the Chainsmokers featuring American singer Rozes. It was released on June 16, 2015, as the second single from their debut EP, Bouquet (2015). Written by the Chainsmokers member Andrew Taggart and Rozes, and produced by the Chainsmokers, the single became the duo's first top 10 hit on the US Billboard Hot 100, reaching number 6 on the chart dating February 13, 2016.

== Background ==
In an interview with Mike Wass of Idolator, the Chainsmokers said, "We always felt the song was special. When you want to listen to it again and again after you’ve made the song, you know you’ve got something. You’ve really got to put it out and let the public try to decide what it is and what it isn’t. When we put the song out, it was an overwhelmingly positive response. That doesn’t mean it’s a hit but we knew that it was a special song. I think that it definitely has a Chainsmokers feel to it, but there’s a lot of influences (Taylor Swift, Max Martin) in the production. But I think that’s what’s cool about it and why people are enjoying it because it doesn’t feel and sound like everything that’s on the radio right now. But it’s catchy and accessible. I think it’s refreshing."

== Composition ==
"Roses" is written in the key of E major with a tempo of 100 beats per minute in common time. The song alternates between the chords E and Esus2, and the vocals span from B_{3} to B_{4}.

== Music video ==
The music video for the song was released to YouTube on August 7, 2015. The video opens with a woman closing the shop she works in for the day, while a man is seen arriving on a plane and leaving the airport. They meet and spend the night watching an old film and smoking on her couch, however in the morning he leaves while she is still asleep. She is upset to see the man has gone and that night searches for him, while he is seen driving his car around the city. She is crying on a street when he sees her and stops his car, and they are reunited and embrace. They return to her couch and the video ends with them kissing. Throughout the video the woman can also be seen dancing in a dark, misty room with two spotlights, and after the couple are reunited, rose petals fall through the air as she dances through them.

== Track listing ==
Digital download
No.	Title	Length
1.	"Roses" (featuring Rozes)	3:46

Digital download – Remixes EP
No.	Title	Length
1.	"Roses" (featuring Rozes) (The Him Remix)	2:57
2.	"Roses" (featuring Rozes) (Zaxx Remix)	3:10
3.	"Roses" (featuring Rozes) (King Arthur Remix)	3:04
4.	"Roses" (featuring Rozes) (Loosid Remix))	3:45
Total length:		12:56

== Charts ==
=== Weekly charts ===
Chart (2015–2017)	Peak position
Australia (ARIA)	5
Austria (Ö3 Austria Top 40)	18
Belgium (Ultratop 50 Flanders)	31
Belgium (Ultratop 50 Wallonia)	22
Canada Hot 100 (Billboard)	6
Czech Republic Airplay (ČNS IFPI)	13
Czech Republic Singles Digital (ČNS IFPI)	9
Denmark (Tracklisten)	29
Finland (Suomen virallinen lista)	18
France (SNEP)	26
Germany (GfK)	24
Hungary (Stream Top 40)	13
Ireland (IRMA)	19
Italy (FIMI)	42
Latvia (Latvijas Top 40)	5
Lebanon (Lebanese Top 20)	9
Netherlands (Dutch Top 40)	15
Netherlands (Single Top 100)	18
New Zealand (Recorded Music NZ)	8
Norway (VG-lista)	8
Scottish Singles Sales (Official Charts)	12
Slovakia Singles Digital (ČNS IFPI)	8
Spain (Promusicae)	60
Sweden (Sverigetopplistan)	13
Switzerland (Schweizer Hitparade)	20
UK Singles (Official Charts)	16
UK Dance (Official Charts)	7
US Billboard Hot 100	6
US Adult Pop Airplay (Billboard)	26
US Dance Airplay (Billboard)	1
US Dance Club Songs (Billboard)	11
US Hot Dance/Electronic Songs (Billboard)	1
US Pop Airplay (Billboard)	3
US Rhythmic Airplay (Billboard)	4

=== Year-end charts ===
Chart (2015)	Position
US Hot Dance/Electronic Songs (Billboard)	25

Chart (2016)	Position
Australia (ARIA)	33
Austria (Ö3 Austria Top 40)	64
Belgium (Ultratop Flanders)	89
Belgium (Ultratop Wallonia)	90
Canada (Canadian Hot 100)	24
France (SNEP)	116
Germany (Official German Charts)	86
Italy (FIMI)	81
Netherlands (Dutch Top 40)	83
Netherlands (Single Top 100)	60
New Zealand (Recorded Music NZ)	23
Sweden (Sverigetopplistan)	43
Switzerland (Schweizer Hitparade)	59
UK Singles (Official Charts Company)	62
US Billboard Hot 100	27
US Hot Dance/Electronic Songs (Billboard)	5
US Mainstream Top 40 (Billboard)	24
US Rhythmic (Billboard)	33

=== Decade-end charts ===
Chart (2010–2019)	Position
US Hot Dance/Electronic Songs (Billboard)	10

== Certifications ==
Region	Certification	Certified units/sales
Australia (ARIA)	5× Platinum	350,000^{‡}
Austria (IFPI Austria)	Gold	15,000^{‡}
Belgium (BRMA)	Gold	10,000^{‡}
Brazil (Pro-Música Brasil)	3× Platinum	180,000^{‡}
Canada (Music Canada)	9× Platinum	720,000^{‡}
Denmark (IFPI Danmark)	Platinum	90,000^{‡}
Germany (BVMI)	Platinum	400,000^{‡}
Italy (FIMI)	2× Platinum	100,000^{‡}
Mexico (AMPROFON)	Diamond	300,000^{‡}
Netherlands (NVPI)	Platinum	30,000^{‡}
New Zealand (RMNZ)	5× Platinum	150,000^{‡}
Norway (IFPI Norway)	Platinum	40,000^{‡}
Poland (ZPAV)	2× Platinum	40,000^{‡}
Spain (Promusicae)	Gold	20,000^{‡}
Sweden (GLF)	4× Platinum	160,000^{‡}
United Kingdom (BPI)	Platinum	600,000^{‡}
United States (RIAA)	8× Platinum	8,000,000^{‡}
^{‡} Sales+streaming figures based on certification alone.

== Release history ==
List of release dates, showing region, formats, label and reference
Region	Date	Format(s)	Label	Ref.
United States	August 25, 2015	Contemporary hit radio	Disruptor; Columbia; Sony	
United States	November 17, 2015	Rhythmic contemporary	Disruptor; Columbia; Sony	

== See also ==
- List of Billboard Hot Dance/Electronic Songs number ones
