= Langley Fine Arts School =

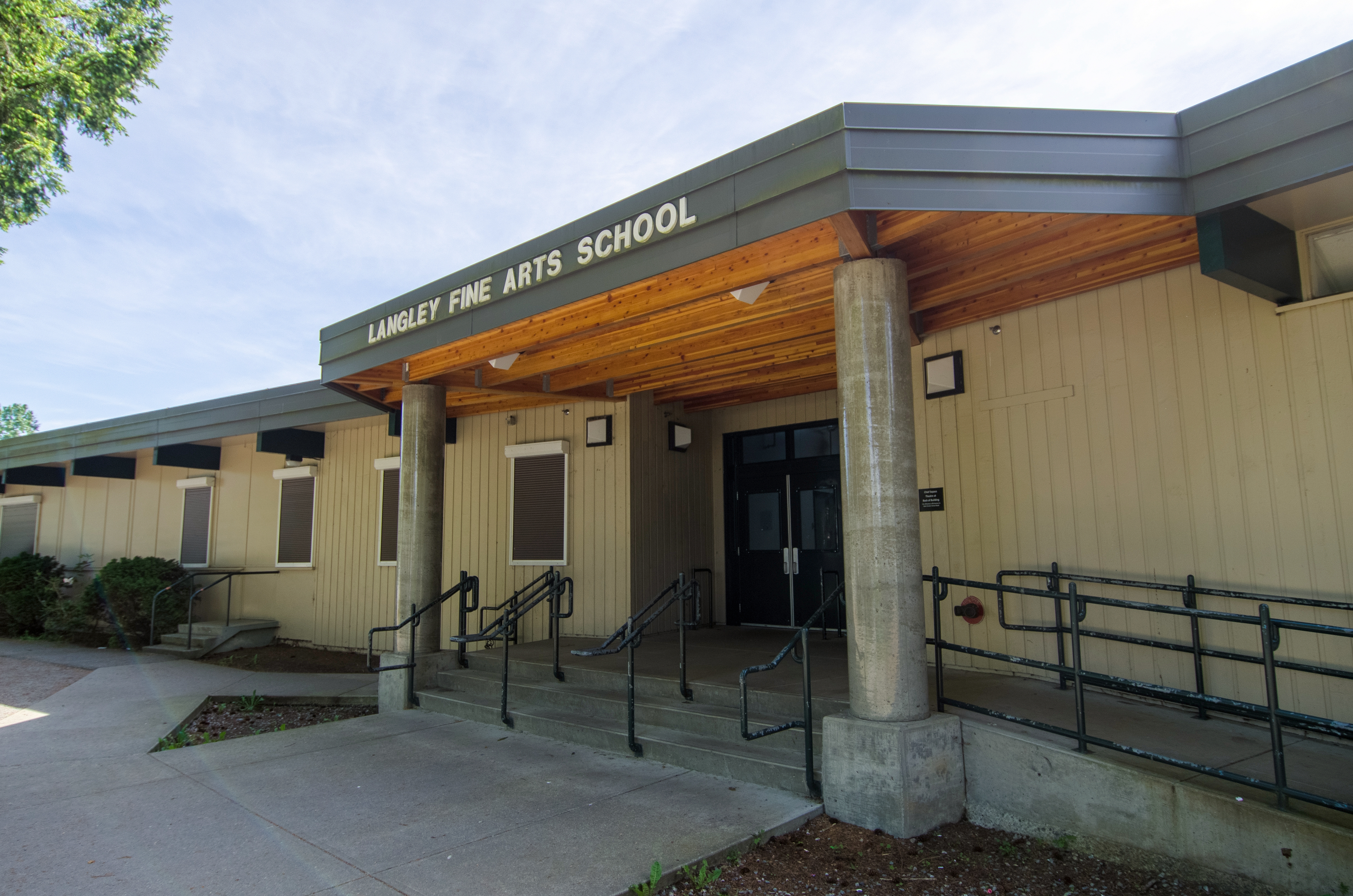
- Langley Fine Arts School

Location
- 9096 Trattle Road; Fort Langley, British Columbia, V1M 2S6; Canada; 49.1683°N 122.5877°W

Information
- School type: Public, high school
- School board: School District 35 Langley
- Principal: Mr. Adam Moore
- Grades: k-12
- Enrollment: 900
- Language: English
- Area: Fort Langley
- Website: www.sd35.bc.ca/lfa/
- Last updated: 2021

Langley Fine Arts School is a public elementary school and secondary school in Fort Langley, British Columbia, Canada, and is part of School District 35 Langley. It serves the Fort Langley area and its arts program attracts many students from across and outside the district. Students must audition or submit a portfolio to be accepted into a senior major. The LFAS major program focuses mainly on four aspects of art: Dance, Drama, Visual Art, and Music. In addition to the four majors, students have the option to switch to photography in the ninth grade or switch to writing in the eleventh grade.

== Chief Sepass Theatre ==
The Chief Sepass Theatre is a theatre at Langley Fine Arts School. On October 30, 2010, someone unsuccessfully attempted to burn the theatre down, but only accomplished setting several of the seats on fire. It is named for Chief Sepass, a local native leader.

== Notable alumni ==
- Michael Bean (Class of 1995) - Actor, author, acting coach, and founder of Biz Studio-an acting school for children and youth.
- Bynon (Class of 2003) - DJ, Record Producer, Music Writer, Performer
- Sarah Jeffery (Class of 2014) - Actress, singer, and dancer.
- Brock Phillips - Singer, songwriter
