= William Sepass =

Chilliwack tribe leader

Chief William Sepass (known in Halkomelem language as K'HHalserten, meaning "Golden Snake") (c. 1840s – 1943) was born at Kettle Falls, Washington but migrated with his tribe into the Chilliwack and Fraser Canyon area of British Columbia after an epidemic. He was leader of what is now known as the Skowkale First Nation or Chilliwack tribe.

== Early life ==
As a boy, Sepass accompanied his tribe north into the Fraser Canyon which was experiencing the Cariboo Gold Rush. His father built and operated a cedar log freight canoe to transport miners and supplies across Chilliwack Lake near the US/Canada border. His maternal grandfather was a chief from further north on the Thompson River.

Sepass married Rose, the daughter of Thompson Uslick and they had eight children. Most died of tuberculosis.

== Career ==
Sepass was trained to become a custodian of family and tribal knowledge.

The Canadian Indian Affairs Department encouraged Sepass to act as a spokesman for natives, which included his representing the Stó:lo people to the 1913 Royal Commission over land claims.

Sepass was a skilled canoe-maker and hunter famous for his speaking ability. He was also a dairy farmer and part of the Native Farmers Association.

== Publications ==
Sepass was partially literate and, being concerned that his people were losing their heritage, when seventy years old he decided he wanted his stories preserved "in the Whiteman's book". His writing included the Stó:lo creation myths and fifteen traditional narrative songs.

He worked with Sophia White Street, the daughter of one of the first missionaries sent out to the Pacific coast by the Wesleyan Methodist Church. Street was fluent in both English and Halkomelem. Between 1911 and 1915 they transcribed and translated the songs.

Other works were translated and published posthumously.

- Sepass, Chief Khalserten (c. 1949). The Songs of Y-Ail-Mihth. Chilliwack, B.C.
- Sepass, Khalserten (1958). The Songs of the Y-Ail-Mihth. Vancouver.
- Sepass, William (1963). Street, Eloise (ed.). Sepass Poems: Songs of Y-Ail-Mihth. Translated by Street, C. L. New York: Vantage.
- Sepass, William (1974). Street, Eloise (ed.). Sepass Tales: Songs of Y-Ail-Mihth. Translated by Street, C. L. Chilliwack: Sepass Trust.
- Sepass, William (2000). Street, Eloise (ed.). Sepass Poems: The Ancient Songs of Y-ail-mihth. Translated by Street, C. L. Mission, B.C: Longhouse..

== Legacy ==
Sepass was one of the first native authors in British Columbia. He is memorialized with the Chief Sepass Theatre in the Langley Fine Arts School.
