= Until You Were Gone (The Chainsmokers and Tritonal song) =

Single by the Chainsmokers and Tritonal featuring Emily Warren

from the EP Bouquet
- Released: September 18, 2015
- Recorded: 2015
- Length: 3:37
- Label: Disruptor; Columbia
- Songwriters: Andrew Taggart; Emily Warren; Chad Cisneros; Dave Reed; Citrus Troy Austin; Jared Scharff; Andrew Williams
- Producers: the Chainsmokers; Tritonal

The Chainsmokers singles chronology
"Split (Only U)" (2015)	"Until You Were Gone" (2015)	"New York City" (2015)

Tritonal singles chronology
"Untouchable" (2015)	"Until You Were Gone" (2015)	"Blackout" (2016)

Emily Warren singles chronology
"Until You Were Gone" (2015)	"Capsize" (2016)

Music video
- "Until You Were Gone" on YouTube on YouTube

"Until You Were Gone" is a song by American DJ duos the Chainsmokers and Tritonal, featuring vocals from American singer Emily Warren. It is the fourth single from the Chainsmoker's debut EP Bouquet. The song was originally released on September 18, 2015. The music video was released on November 23, 2015. The song peaked at number 21 on the US Dance/Electronic Songs chart, and number 55 on the 2016 Dance/Electronic Songs year-end chart.

The song is featured on the soundtrack for NHL 17.

== Music video ==
The music video was released on November 23, 2015, through the Chainsmokers' Vevo account on YouTube.

The video portrays the Chainsmokers and Tritonal attempting to each gain the attention of the same girl (who is a gym instructor). They all try their best to impress her, but in the end, she ignores them all for someone else.

== Charts ==
=== Weekly charts ===
Chart performance for "Until You Were Gone"
Chart (2015–2016)	Peak position
US Dance Airplay (Billboard)	26
US Hot Dance/Electronic Songs (Billboard)	21

=== Year-end charts ===
Year-end chart performance for "Until You Were Gone'
Chart (2016)	Position
US Hot Dance/Electronic Songs (Billboard)	55

== Certifications ==
Certifications for "Until You Were Gone"
Region	Certification	Certified units/sales
Canada (Music Canada)	Platinum	80,000^{‡}
United States (RIAA)	Gold	500,000^{‡}
^{‡} Sales+streaming figures based on certification alone.
