= High-angle shot =

Camera angle

A high-angle shot from Big Buck Bunny

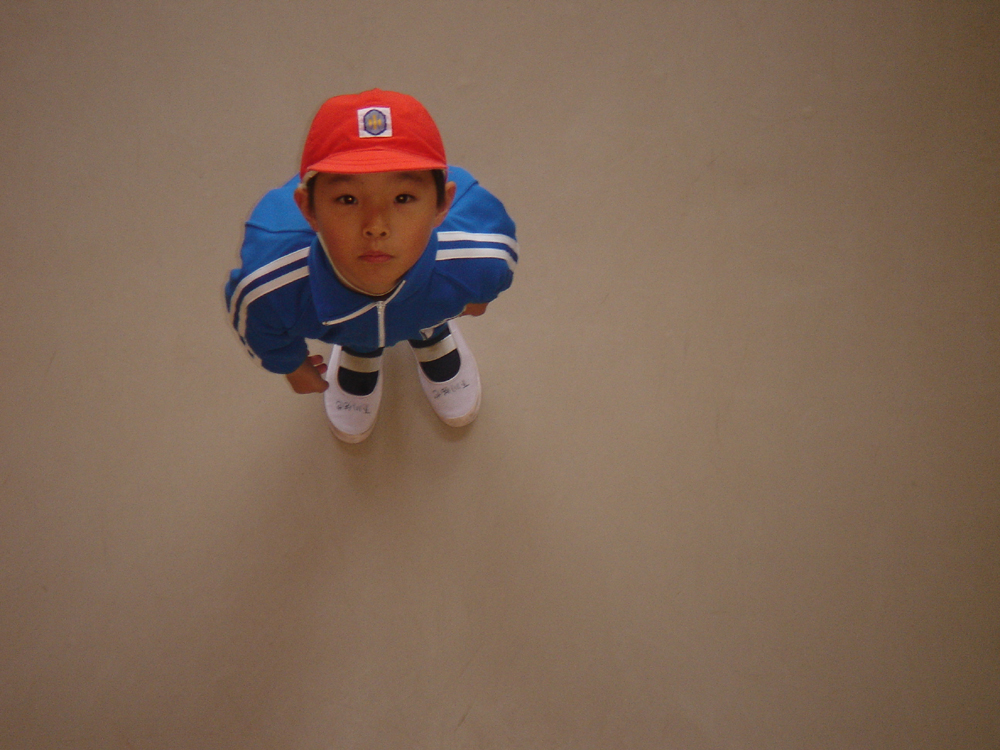
Example of high-angle shot in photography

A high-angle shot is a cinematic technique where the camera looks down on the subject from a high angle and the point of focus often gets "swallowed up".

High-angle shots can make the subject seem vulnerable or powerless when applied with the correct mood, setting, and effects. In film, they can make the scene more dramatic. If there is a person at high elevation who is talking to someone below them, this shot is often used.

The height required for this shot is low enough to be achieved without flight, thus distinguishing it from a bird's-eye view.

== The "MySpace angle" ==
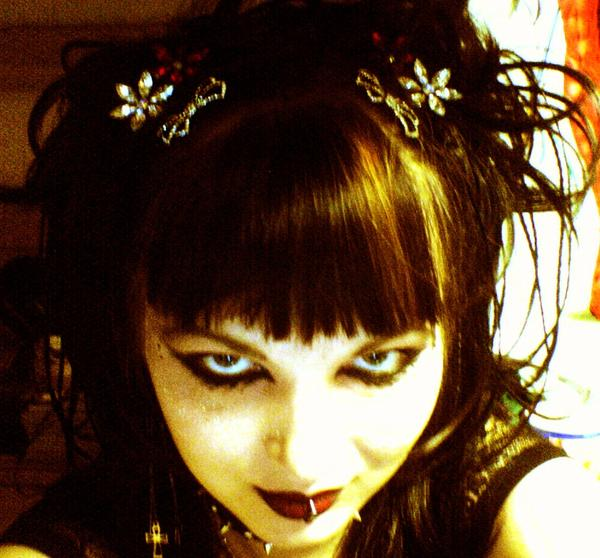
A picture in the style of a MySpace profile

The MySpace angle is so called because it is associated with profile pictures on social networking websites such as MySpace. It is a selfie taken with a phone camera held at arm's length above the head of the photographer/subject. The face of the subject fills the image, while the body is foreshortened. Several gestures and grimaces may be associated. Practitioners consider this angle to flatter the subject by accentuating the face and cleavage, while dissimulating an unattractive body. However, its frequent use was protested by some viewers who found it deceptive.

== See also ==
- Camera angle
- Low-angle shot
