= Capsize (song) =

Single by Frenship and Emily Warren

from the album Truce
- Released: June 18, 2016
- Recorded: May 2015
- Genre: Dance-pop; tropical house
- Length: 3:57
- Label: Columbia
- Songwriters: James Sunderland; Brett Hite; Emily Warren; Scott Hoffman
- Producer: Frenship

Frenship singles chronology
"Nowhere" (2015)	"Capsize" (2016)	"1000 Nights" (2017)

Emily Warren singles chronology
"Until You Were Gone" (2015)	"Capsize" (2016)	"Phone Down" (2016)

Music video
- "Capsize" on YouTube

"Capsize" is a single by American duo Frenship, released on June 18, 2016. It features the vocal collaboration of American songwriter Emily Warren. The song first gained prominence on the music streaming platform Spotify before hitting charts around the world, reaching over 600 million streams since release, making the song a viral hit. The music video, directed by Andrew Donoho, featured two dancers standing at opposite ends of a lake who proceed to dance on the water.

== Charts ==
=== Weekly charts ===
Chart (2016–2017)	Peak position
Australia (ARIA)	17
Austria (Ö3 Austria Top 40)	41
Belgium (Ultratip Bubbling Under Flanders)	1
Belgium (Ultratip Bubbling Under Wallonia)	11
Canada Hot 100 (Billboard)	55
Czech Republic Airplay (ČNS IFPI)	16
Czech Republic Singles Digital (ČNS IFPI)	25
Finland Airplay (Radiosoittolista)	36
France Streaming Singles (SNEP)	98
Germany (GfK)	45
Hungary (Rádiós Top 40)	22
Hungary (Stream Top 40)	25
Ireland (IRMA)	25
Italy (FIMI)	41
Netherlands (Single Top 100)	37
New Zealand (Recorded Music NZ)	14
Norway (VG-lista)	11
Portugal (AFP)	33
Slovakia Airplay (ČNS IFPI)	56
Slovakia Singles Digital (ČNS IFPI)	25
Spain (PROMUSICAE)	90
Sweden (Sverigetopplistan)	20
Switzerland (Schweizer Hitparade)	38
UK Singles (OCC)	59
UK Dance (OCC)	21
US Billboard Hot 100	78
US Pop Airplay (Billboard)	24

=== Year-end charts ===
Chart (2016)	Position
Germany (Official German Charts)	95
Netherlands (Single Top 100)	82
Sweden (Sverigetopplistan)	70
Switzerland (Schweizer Hitparade)	87
Chart (2017)	Position
Australia (ARIA)	79

== Certifications ==
Region	Certification	Certified units/sales
Australia (ARIA)	3× Platinum	210,000^{‡}
Canada (Music Canada)	2× Platinum	160,000^{‡}
Denmark (IFPI Danmark)	Platinum	90,000^{‡}
France (SNEP)	Gold	66,666^{‡}
Germany (BVMI)	Gold	200,000^{‡}
Italy (FIMI)	Platinum	50,000^{‡}
Mexico (AMPROFON)	Gold	30,000^{‡}
New Zealand (RMNZ)	3× Platinum	90,000^{‡}
Norway (IFPI Norway)	2× Platinum	80,000^{‡}
Poland (ZPAV)	Gold	10,000^{‡}
Sweden (GLF)	Platinum	40,000^{‡}
Switzerland (IFPI Switzerland)	Gold	15,000^{‡}
United Kingdom (BPI)	Gold	400,000^{‡}
United States (RIAA)	Platinum	1,000,000^{‡}
^{‡} Sales+streaming figures based on certification alone.

== Release history ==
Country	Date	Format	Label	Ref.
Worldwide	June 18, 2016	Digital download	Columbia	
United States	August 16, 2016	Contemporary hit radio	Columbia	
Italy	September 9, 2016	Contemporary hit radio	Sony	
