= Active Child =

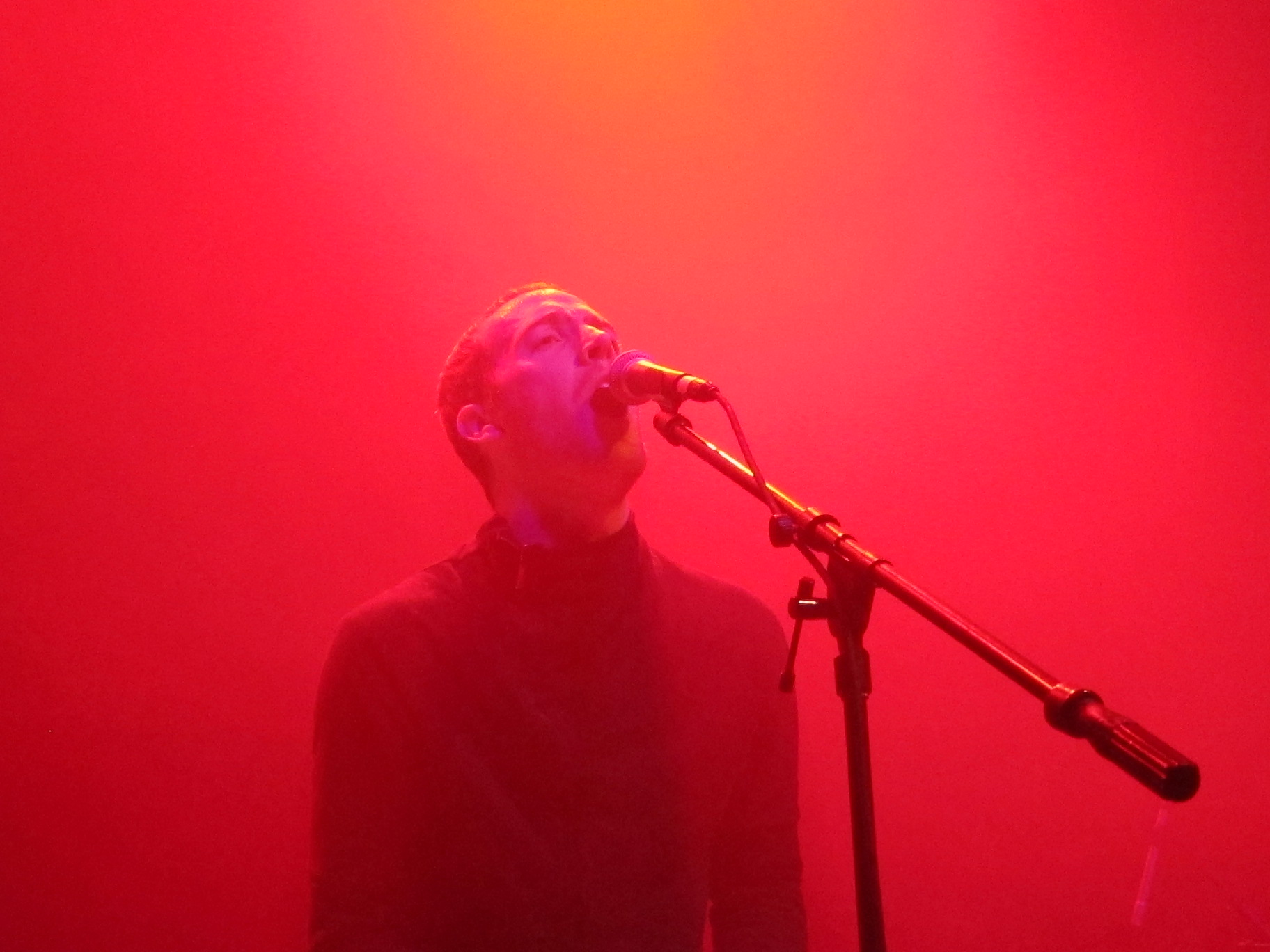
- Active Child performing in 2012

Background information
- Born: Patrick James Grossi; May 28, 1983 (age 43); Elizabeth, New Jersey, U.S.
- Genres: R&B; new wave; ambient; electronic; soul; experimental
- Occupations: Singer, songwriter, producer
- Instruments: Vocals, harp, synthesizer, piano, guitar
- Years active: 2010–present
- Labels: Vagrant, Spunk, Plancha
- Website: www.activechildmusic.com

Patrick James Grossi (born May 28, 1983), better known by his stage name Active Child, is an American singer, songwriter, and record producer. His debut album, You Are All I See, was released in 2011 and produced by Ariel Rechtshaid, and garnered substantial reviews from media outlets like Pitchfork Media and Drowned in Sound. In 2011, Active Child opened for British musician James Blake and for the French synthpop band M83. In 2012, his song, "Hanging On," was covered by English pop artist Ellie Goulding and later included on her second album, Halcyon.

== Early life ==
Grossi was born May 28, 1983, in Elizabeth, New Jersey, the son of Bob Grossi, a sales executive for Priority Records and Donna Grossi, an abstract and figurative painter. His father's music had been a childhood influence through the rhythms of '80s alternative dance bands like New Order and at the age of 9 he started singing with the Philadelphia Boys Choir. Grossi, at a very young age, began touring with the Philly Boys Choir in Europe, South Africa and Australia, performing at Carnegie Hall, Sydney Opera House and singing with a choir in South Africa. As a teenager, he listened to a lot of early 1990s gangster rap and focused on sports and education. During his college days in Colorado, the local arts landscape influenced him to pick up guitar and harp and rediscover his musical talent. He combined elements learned as a child and during his time with Philly Boys Choir, with his falsetto, live harp, and evocative lyrics and debuted in 2010 as Active Child.

== Career ==
=== 2010: Career beginnings ===
Grossi's first release was Sun Rooms, a cassette put out on January 14, 2010, by Mirror Universe Tapes. That same year, came a 7" vinyl single, She Was A Vision, which was released in February 2010 via Transparent. The record includes the single She Was A Vision and b-side Voice of an Old Friend. His first official EP, Curtis Lane EP was released in June 2010, The Guardian remarked how the "sombre young man creates glacial and gloomy music", and how the songs have "a sort of spiritual quality". Pitchfork Media wrote that Grossi displayed "an aptitude for the grandeur and grace of M83, OMD, and Animal Collective".

=== 2011–present ===
Grossi released his debut LP, You Are All I See in August 2011, featuring tracks such as Hanging On and Johnny Belinda. Drowned in Sound remarked, "You Are All I See is all about the shimmer, Grossi's touch is so deft, and the sound so seemingly in tune with the natural world, he somehow is able to play with light." By 2013, he released albums and EPs for labels including Vagrant, Spunk, Plancha and others. Several of his tracks have appeared on compilations and in multiple films including Divergent and The Host.

In August 2011, Active Child appeared on NPR Music Mondays and in 2012, he appeared on a mixtape, I Like Boys Who Cry with Charli XCX. Later in the year, he appeared in a compilation, The Singles with Lana Del Rey, PRAY with Gilbere Forte and Classixx debut album Hanging Gardens. His second single album, Mercy was released in June 2015 by Vagrant and produced by Van Rivers. Spin magazine described the album as "heartbreaking and luxurious " with Pitchfork remarking that his vocals on the record are "astonishing, like a rising updraft". His track "Painted Staircase" was featured in the official trailer of the Apple TV+ series, Defending Jacob (2020).

=== Tours ===
Around 2010, Grossi embarked on his first support tour with White Rabbits playing shows throughout the UK and Europe. In 2011 Grossi announced he would be undertaking another American tour in November with M83. He announced tour dates to support the British electronic musician James Blake; in May 2011, the tour included a stop at Chicago's Lincoln Hall and New York's Bowery Ballroom. The Los Angeles Times described his live performance as "one of the most original and ambitious sounds in Los Angeles". In February 2012, he announced a headline spring tour where after jaunting across the UK and Europe in February and March, Grossi landed stateside for a series of shows running from April 27 in Pomona, California, to May 22 in Salt Lake City, Utah. Grossi was supported for the U.S. leg by alt-singer Balam Acab. In May 2015, he again toured United States, at Lighting in a Bottle Festival opening at Bradley, California, the tour was completed in nearly two months at The Cathedral Sanctuary at Immanuel Presbyterian in Los Angeles.

=== Major festivals ===
Since 2010, Grossi has been touring consistently in the States as well as overseas, including performances at the Latitude Festival in 2010, Fun Fun Fun Fest in 2011 and Montreux Jazz Festival in 2012. Some of his major live performances at the festivals are

- Latitude 2010
- Mioogfest 2011
- Hove Fest 2012
- Fun Fun Fun Fest 2011 2013
- Symbiosis Gathering 2013
- St Jerome Laneway 2012
- Sasquatch Festival 2012
- Metropolis Festival 2012
- Montreux Jazz Fest 2012
- Melbourne Arts Festival 2013
- Lightning in a Bottle 2015

== Discography ==
=== Studio albums ===
You Are All I See (2011, Vagrant Records)

No.	Title	Length
1.	"You Are All I See"	4:05
2.	"Hanging On"	5:26
3.	"Playing House" (feat. How to Dress Well)	3:23
4.	"See Thru Eyes"	4:19
5.	"High Priestess"	3:24
6.	"Ivy"	3:06
7.	"Way Too Fast"	5:16
8.	"Ancient Eye"	3:38
9.	"Shield & Sword"	3:39
10.	"Johnny Belinda"	5:03
Total length:		41:19

Bonus Tracks
No.	Title	Length
11.	"Call Me Tonight" (bonus track)	3:18
12.	"Hanging On" (White Sea remix, bonus track)	4:01
13.	"Diamond Heart" (B-side, bonus track)	5:40
14.	"Body Heat (So Far Away)" (bonus track)	3:57
15.	"Playing House" (Chad Valley remix, bonus track)	4:01
16.	"Hanging On" (live at WFUV, bonus track)	5:10

Mercy (2015, Vagrant Records)

No.	Title	Length
1.	"1999"	4:05
2.	"These Arms"	3:51
3.	"Never Far Away"	3:18
4.	"Darling"	4:22
5.	"Mercy"	3:51
6.	"Midnight Swim"	2:11
7.	"Stranger"	3:16
8.	"Temptation"	3:34
9.	"Lazarus"	3:31
10.	"Too Late"	3:31
Total length:		35:30

In Another Life (2020, Sony Music)

No.	Title	Length
1.	"In Another Life"	3:49
2.	"All Eyes on You"	4:07
3.	"Set Me Free"	4:26
4.	"Color Me"	3:54
5.	"Gaze Will Cast a Shadow"	3:31
6.	"Spirit Buoy"	3:29
7.	"Weightless"	3:11
8.	"Brighter Day"	6:16
9.	"Painted Staircase"	4:14
10.	"Cruel World"	5:15
Total length:		42:00

=== EPs ===
- "Curtis Lane" (Merok Records, 2010)

No.	Title	Length
1.	"I'm in Your Church at Night"	4:35
2.	"She Was a Vision"	5:07
3.	"When Your Love Is Safe"	4:27
4.	"Take Shelter"	5:33
5.	"Weight of the World"	4:49
6.	"Wilderness"	4:46
Total length:		29:17

- "Sun Rooms" (2010)

No.	Title	Length
1.	"She Was a Vision"
2.	"Take Shelter"
3.	"Wilderness"
4.	"When Your Love is Safe"
5.	"Voice of an Old Friend"
6.	"See Thru Eyes"

- "Rapor" (2013)

No.	Title	Length
1.	"She Cut Me"	2:12
2.	"Subtle" (feat. Mikky Ekko)	4:00
3.	"Feeling Is Gone"	3:26
4.	"Silhouette" (feat. Ellie Goulding)	4:08
5.	"Calling in the Name of Love"	4:16
6.	"Evening Ceremony"	4:07
Total length:		22:09

=== Remix ===
- Steve Mason – Lost and Found
- Wolf Gang – Back To Back
- Marina and The Diamonds- "OH NO!"
- School of Seven Bells – Heart is Strange
- Hannah Cohen – Crying Game
- Angus and Julia Stone – It's all okay
- Angus and Julia Stone – Heartbreak
- Lana Del Rey – Ride

=== Compilations ===
- Molotov Cocktail: A Spunk Sampler, 2010
- LSTN #10, 2010
- Adult Swim Singles Program 2011 (2011, Williams Street Productions) features "Hanging On"
- #99, 2011
- Triple J's Like a Version Eight, 2012
- Un automne, 2012
- Cyclonic Footsteps: Spunk Sampler 2013
- LUXE (2017, Williams Street Productions) features "Cruel World"
