= Rapor =

EP by Active Child
- Released: October 22, 2013
- Recorded: 2013; Heavy Duty Studios (Burbank, California); Rapor Studios (Los Angeles, California)
- Length: 22:17
- Label: Vagrant Records
- Producer: Kevin Seaton, Nick Ruth

Active Child chronology
You Are All I See (2011)	Rapor (2013)

Singles from Rapor
- 1. "Evening Ceremony" Released: 2013; 2. "She Cut Me" Released: August 12, 2013; 3. "Subtle" Released: September 10, 2013

Professional ratings
Review scores
Source	Rating
Consequence of Sound	3/5 stars
Pitchfork	5.6/10
Pretty Much Amazing	B
Rolling Stone	2.5/5 stars
Slant Magazine	4/5 stars

Rapor is an EP from Active Child released on October 22, 2013. The first single from the EP, "Evening Ceremony", was featured in the 2013 film The Host. The second single, "She Cut Me", was released on August 12, 2013. The third single, "Subtle" featuring Mikky Ekko, was released on September 10, 2013.

== Track listing ==
Adapted from iTunes Store.

No.	Title	Length
1.	"She Cut Me"	2:12
2.	"Subtle" (featuring Mikky Ekko)	4:00
3.	"Feeling Is Gone"	3:26
4.	"Silhouette" (featuring Ellie Goulding)	4:08
5.	"Calling in the Name of Love"	4:16
6.	"Evening Ceremony"	4:07

== Release history ==
Nation	Date	Format	Label
United States	October 22, 2013	CD, digital download	Vagrant
United Kingdom	October 22, 2013	CD, digital download	Third Rock
Australia	October 22, 2013	CD, digital download	Spunk Music
