= Bynon =

- Also known as: Richard Beynon, King Richard, Ratchet Richard
- Born: Richard Glenmor Beynon
- Origin: London, United Kingdom
- Genres: Electro house, progressive house, dance-pop
- Occupations: DJ, producer, remixer
- Instrument: Ableton Live
- Years active: 2008–present
- Labels: Ultra Music, Atlantic Records, Armada Music, Sony Music Entertainment, Revealed Recordings, Spinnin
- Website: www.bynonofficial.com

Richard Glenmor Beynon, stage name Bynon (stylized BYNON), is a British-Canadian music producer and DJ.

== Early life ==
The clarinet prodigy-turned-DJ/producer/songwriter comes from a family of musicians hailing from South Wales (UK). He grew up in Vancouver, British Columbia. He studied at Langley Fine Arts School, Juilliard School, and McGill University.

He played guitar, bass, keyboards, piano, and drums before becoming a clarinet player. He performed with the Surrey Youth Orchestra and the Vancouver Summer Pops Youth Orchestra and won gold at the Kiwanis International Fraser Valley Music Festival.He played guitar, bass, keyboards, piano, and drums before becoming a clarinet player. He performed with the Surrey Youth Orchestra and the Vancouver Summer Pops Youth Orchestra and won gold at the Kiwanis International Fraser Valley Music Festival.

Collaborating with his father, Bynon arranged and produced three successful albums featuring many genres of music including classical, jazz, and pop.

== Career ==
A seasoned performer, Bynon toured around North America, with multiple dates in Europe and Asia. Highlights include Paradiso Festival at the Gorge in Seattle, a four-year residency in the Las Vegas circuit featuring Legendary Pool Party REHAB and SLS, and most recently in 2018 at îleSoniq Festival, in his adopted hometown of Montreal.

With his freshman releases alongside Dannic, Project 46 & Feenixpawl, his name popped up monthly on Beatport top 10 charts, (Golden Hearts, Eyes, Home) on Revealed, Ultra Records and Atlantic throughout 2014.

At the end of 2015, Bynon's rework of "Ganja Man" featuring Sean Paul went viral on YouTube, accumulating over 23 million views.

In early 2016, Bynon decided to focus primarily on songwriting and production, working with Sean Paul, Kaskade, Ilsey, Taryn Manning, Mako, Jane XØ and many more. He has been involved with major projects at Columbia, Atlantic, Sony and Warner Music. Corey Hart commissioned him to co-write and produce Jonathan Roy's sophomore album Mr. Optimist Blues, which included the Certified Gold Record Smash "Daniella Denmark".

He has co-written numerous #1 iTunes albums and singles, and issued several solo releases and remixes in 2018.

== Personal life ==
Bynon resides in both Montreal and Los Angeles. He credits his sister as his biggest inspiration.

== Discography ==
=== Singles and remixes ===
| Single | Year | Peak chart positions | Certifications | Label | Album |
|---|---|---|---|---|---|
| ''Close to You'' (under Richard Beynon) | 2011 | — | — | Perfecto Records | Non-album singles |
| ''I Don't Wanna Stop'' (under Richard Beynon with Etienne Osborne) | 2011 | — | — | HotFingers | Non-album singles |
| ''Metronome'' (under Richard Beynon with Yanik Coen) | 2012 | — | — | Perfecto Records | Non-album singles |
| ''What Does Tomorrow Bring'' (Under Richard Beynon with Starkillers feat. Natalie Peris) | 2012 | — | — | Next Plateau/Universal | Non-album singles |
| ''Keep Pushin''' (under Richard Beynon with Starkillers & Dmitry KO) | 2012 | — | — | Spinnin' Records | Non-album singles |
| ''Mirrors'' (under Richard Beynon feat. Sam Olsson) | 2013 | — | — | Perfecto Records | Non-album singles |
| ''Rampage'' (under Richard Beynon with Starkillers feat. Kai) | 2013 | — | — | Spinnin' Records | Non-album singles |
| ''You'' (under Richard Beynon with Dmitry KO) | 2013 | — | — | Stricktl Rhythm | Non-album singles |
| ''Neon Eyes'' (Remix) (under Richard Beynon with Saints of Valory) | 2013 | — | — | Atlantic Records | Non-album remix |
| ''Eyes'' (with Project 46) | 2014 | — | — | Ultra Music | Non-album singles |
| ''All the Way'' (feat. Taryn Manning) | 2015 | — | — | S2 Records | Non-album singles |
| ''Golden Hearts'' (Dannic Edit) (with Domeno feat. Alice Berg) | 2015 | — | — | Revealed Recordings | Non-album singles |
| ''Home'' (with Feenixpawl & Project 46 feat. Melissa Ramsay) | 2015 | — | — | Ultra Music | Non-album singles |
| ''Lyon'' (with Adam & Luwiss) | 2015 | — | — | Eclypse Records | Non-album singles |
| ''Hey Hey'' | 2015 | — | — | Ultra Music | Non-album singles |
| ''City of Angels'' (with Rumours) | 2016 | — | — | Ultra Music | Non-album singles |
| ''Castles'' (with Project 46) | 2016 | — | — | Arkade | Non-album singles |
| ''Ganja Man'' (with Sean Paul) | 2016 | — | — | White label | Non-album singles |
| ''Love Me'' (Remix) (feat. Forest Blakk) | 2018 | — | — | Atlantic Records | Non-album remixes |
| ''Heat'' (Remix) (feat. Kelly Clarkson) | 2019 | — | — | Atlantic Records | Non-album remixes |
| ''Let's Ride'' (feat. Rose Adam) | 2019 | — | — | SPRKL Falcon | Non-album singles |
| ''Voss'' | 2019 | — | — | Arkade | Non-album singles |
| ''Love Like That'' (Remix) (with Kaskade) | 2020 | — | — | | Non-album remix |

=== Songwriting and production credits ===
| Track | Year | Artist(s) | Album | Written with: | Produced with: |
|---|---|---|---|---|---|
| "Jacaré" | 2023 | Sofi Tukker | Single | Roland Gajate Garcia, Sofi Tukker | Sofi Tukker, Roland Gajate Garcia |
| "If Anything's Left" | 2023 | Jamie Fine | Single | Danielle Alisa Poppitt, Jamie Fine | |
| ''Love Like That'' | 2020 | Kaskade, Dani Poppitt | Single | Kaskade, Dani Poppitt | Kaskade |
| ''Purple Hat'' - Dillon Francis Remix | 2020 | Sofi Tukker | Remix | Sofi Tukker | Dillon Francis |
| ''S.I.L.W.U'' | 2020 | Sara Diamond | Single | Sara Diamond | |
| ''Beautiful Scar'' | 2019 | Alicia Moffet | Single | Alicia Moffet | |
| ''Purple Hat'' | 2019 | Sofi Tukker | Single | Sofi Tukker | Sofi Tukker |
| ''Let's Ride'' | 2019 | Bynon, Rose Adam | Single | Rose Adam | |
| ''With You'' | 2019 | Kaskade, Meghan Trainor | Single | Kaskade | Kaskade |
| ''Heat''- Bynon Remix | 2019 | Kelly Clarkson, Bynon | Remix | | |
| ''Open Up'' | 2019 | Alicia Moffet | Single | Alicia Moffet | |
| ''Take Control'' | 2019 | Alicia Moffet | Single | Alicia Moffet | |
| ''Lies'' | 2019 | Domeno, Zagata | Single | Domeno, Zagata | Domeno |
| ''Love Me Like You Used To'' | 2019 | Kaskade, Cecilia Gault | Redux 003 | Kaskade, Cecilia Gault | Kaskade |
| ''Come Through | 2018 | Jonas Blue, Kaskade, Olivia Noelle | Single | | |
| ''Almost Back'' | 2018 | Kaskade, Phoebe Ryan, LoKii | Single | Kaskade, LoKii, Phoebe Ryan | Kaskade, LoKii |
| ''Love Me'' - Bynon Remix | 2018 | Forest Blakk | Remix | Forest Blakk | |
| ''Nobody Like You'' | 2017 | Kaskade | Redux 002 | Kaskade | Kaskade |
| ''Deck the Halls'' | 2017 | Kaskade, Erika Sirola | Kaskade Christmas | Kaskade, Erika Sirola | Kaskade |
| ''Love Me'' | 2016 | Jane XØ | Alternate Love | | |
| ''Into the Sunset'' | 2016 | Mako | Hourglass | Mako | |
