= Frenship =

American pop duo

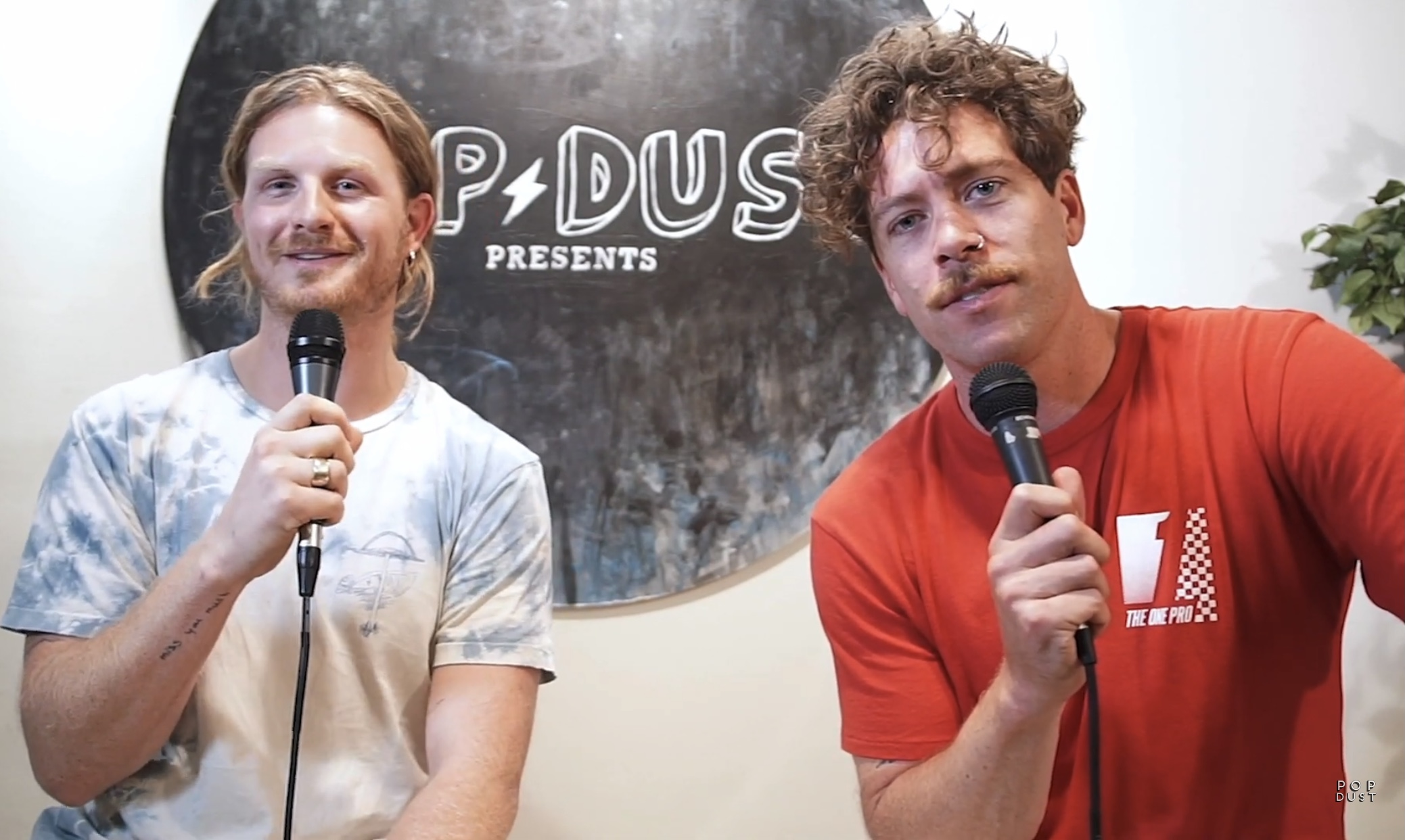
- Frenship in 2019; Sunderland (left) and Hite (right)

Background information
- Origin: Los Angeles, California, U.S.
- Genres: Electronic, electropop
- Years active: 2013–present
- Labels: Columbia, Counter Records, NinjaTune
- Members: James Sunderland; Brett Hite
- Website: Wearefrenship.com

Frenship (stylized FRENSHIP) is an American pop duo, consisting of James Sunderland and Brett Hite. They are best known for their 2016 single, "Capsize".

== Career ==
Sunderland and Hite met while working at the fitness store Lululemon and became fans of each other's music; this led to them creating music together. The duo first posted to SoundCloud the song "Knives", which was produced alongside Norwegian producer Matoma. The track gained popularity online which led the duo to upload a second track, "Nowhere", followed by "Carpet".

In June 2016, the duo released "Capsize", a collaboration with American singer and songwriter Emily Warren, charting in multiple countries. The song also reached number one on Hype Machine, and has surpassed 505 million streams on Spotify. Their follow up single "1000 Nights" has over 45 million streams on Spotify to date, and was played on alternative radio. Frenship released their debut EP, Truce, in September 2016 via Columbia Records.

Their debut album, Vacation, was released on May 17, 2019.

On September 10, 2021, the duo released the single "All My Friends". The song recounts their experience during the COVID-19 pandemic.

The duo released their final album, Leavenworth, on October 18, 2024, announcing it would be their final album as a group.

== Discography ==
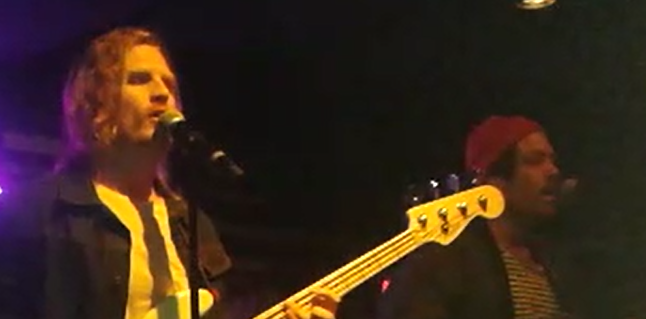
Frenship performing in Montreal in April 2018

=== Albums ===
Title	Details
Vacation	Released: May 17, 2019; Label: Counter
Leavenworth	Released: October 18, 2024; Label: Frenship

=== EPs ===
Title	Details
Truce	Released: September 2, 2016; Label: Columbia; Format: Digital download

=== Singles ===
Title	Year	Peak chart positions										Certifications	Album
Title	Year	US	AUS	CAN	GER	ITA	NLD	NOR	NZ	SWE	UK	Certifications	Album
"Kids"	2013	—	—	—	—	—	—	—	—	—	—		Non-album singles
"Morrison"	2014	—	—	—	—	—	—	—	—	—	—		Non-album singles
"Knives" (with Matoma)	2015	—	—	—	—	—	—	—	—	—	—		Non-album singles
"Nowhere"	2015	—	—	—	—	—	—	—	—	—	—		Non-album singles
"Capsize" (with Emily Warren)	2016	78	17	55	45	41	37	11	14	20	59	RIAA: Platinum; ARIA: 3× Platinum; BPI: Gold; BVMI: Gold; FIMI: Platinum; GLF: Platinum; IFPI NOR: 2× Platinum; MC: 2× Platinum; RMNZ: 3× Platinum	Truce
"1000 Nights"	2017	—	—	—	—	—	—	—	—	—	—		Truce
"Love Somebody"	2018	—	—	—	—	—	—	—	—	—	—		Non-album singles
"Goodmorning, Goodbye"	2018	—	—	—	—	—	—	—	—	—	—		Non-album singles
"Mi Amore"	2018	—	—	—	—	—	—	—	—	—	—		Non-album singles
"Wanted a Name" (featuring Yoke Lore)	2019	—	—	—	—	—	—	—	—	—	—		Vacation
"All My Friends"	2021	—	—	—	—	—	—	—	—	—	—		Non-album single
"—" denotes a recording that did not chart or was not released in that territory.
