= Duro =

Duro may refer to:

== People ==
=== Given name ===
- Đuro, South Slavic masculine given name
- Duro Faseyi, Nigerian politician
- Duro Ladipo, Nigerian playwright
- Duro Olowu, Nigerian-born British fashion designer
- Duro Onabule, Nigerian journalist
- Duro Oni, Nigerian professor and university administrator

=== Middle name ===
- Cinon Duro Mataweer, Native American leader

=== Surname ===
- Albert Duro (born 1978), Albanian football center back
- Aldo Duro, Italian linguist and lexicographer
- Andrea Duro, Spanish actress
- Angelo Duro, Italian comedian
- Dóra Dúró, Hungarian parliamentarian
- Cesáreo Fernández Duro, Spanish navy officer and historian
- Fiqiri Duro (born 1938), Albanian football forward
- Guillermo Duró, Argentine football manager
- Hugo Duro (born 1999), Spanish football striker
- Ibrahim Duro, Bosnian footballer
- Ilir Duro (born 1966), Albanian football manager and former football forward
- Jaime Duro, Spanish canoeist
- José António Duro, Portuguese poet
- József Duró (1966–2022), Hungarian football midfielder and manager
- Ken Duro Ifill, American audio engineer
- Klodian Duro (born 1977), Albanian football attacking midfielder and coach
- Pedro Duro, Spanish businessman
- Samir Duro, Bosnian footballer
- Shpëtim Duro, Albanian football manager

== Other uses ==
- Duro, a nickname for the Spanish five-peseta coin
- Tunisian duro, unit of Tunisian currency
- Duro (song), 2026 song by Skrillex
- Duro v. Reina (1990), a U.S. Supreme Court case
- Duro (Star Wars), a fictional planet in the Star Wars franchise
- the Mowag Duro, a wheeled military vehicle produced by MOWAG
  - includes the Duro III
- Showtek (Sjoerd Janssen), Dutch DJ sometimes called DJ Duro
- Duros (food)

== See also ==
- Duros (disambiguation)
