= Abortion in Tunisia =

In Tunisia, abortion is legal on request in the first trimester. Later abortions are permitted on physical or mental health grounds. Abortion for minors requires parental consent. A 1973 law requires public medical facilities to provide free abortions on request, but many lack the service or enforce additional requirements. Most abortions are performed at private facilities, which are more permissive. Tunisia's abortion law is the most permissive in the Middle East and North Africa.

Tunisia's abortion law was originally based on that of France, which banned abortion. After the independence of Tunisia, political leaders advocated for legal abortion to lower the population growth rate. President Habib Bourguiba passed a 1965 law permitting women with five children to receive abortions with spousal consent, making Tunisia the first country in the Muslim world to liberalize its abortion law. A 1973 amendment extended legal abortion to all women and lifted the requirement for spousal consent. The Office national de la famille et de la population (ONFP) began providing free abortions under a program to decrease birth rates, which was replaced in the 1990s with reproductive and sexual health programs. Medical abortion was approved in 2001 after a series of tests. By the Tunisian Revolution of 2011, increasing conservatism and an economic crisis led to a decline in abortion access. Some facilities stopped providing the service, and conscientious objection to abortion became common. The ruling Ennahda party opposed abortion, and a member of the party, Najiba Berioul, unsuccessfully proposed a ban in 2013. Later governments supported abortion, and the country signed and ratified the Maputo Protocol in the 2010s.

Medical abortion is the most common method in public facilities, while surgical abortion is more common in private facilities. Only private facilities provide abortions after the first trimester. Despite the legality of abortion, many women are denied access. Many medical providers have negative attitudes about it, contributing to false interpretations of the law. Tunisia has a taboo surrounding abortion, and many women are unaware it is legal. Much of the country opposes abortion on Islamic grounds, especially under the Maliki school of jurisprudence. A few activist groups, including the Tunisian Association of Democratic Women, advocate for abortion access in the country.

== Legislation ==
Article 214 of the Penal Code of Tunisia permits abortion up to a gestational age of three months (the first trimester). It does not specify how gestational age is counted. Later abortions are permitted if the pregnancy threatens the mother's health or "psychological equilibrium", as well as if it risks "serious" fetal defects (though it does not specify which defects qualify). Performing, attempting, or procuring an illegal abortion is punishable by a prison sentence of two years and a fine of 2,000 Tunisian dinars. The article of the penal code that decriminalizes abortion is about murder, having initially classified abortion as such. It has not been amended since 1973, as of 2020.

First-trimester abortions may be performed at any licensed medical facility; public facilities provide them for free. Later abortions are only performed at specially approved facilities and with approval from a treating physician. Abortions for mental health grounds require a psychological evaluation. Spousal consent is not required for abortions, but for minors, parental consent is required. Private facilities do not strictly enforce this. Some public facilities enforce higher requirements than the law allows. Medical providers are allowed to opt out of procedures, but the country does not have a law explicitly allowing conscientious objection to abortion. The law is unclear about the circumstances that permit such objection, which is instead invoked through the guidelines of the International Federation of Gynaecology and Obstetrics.

Tunisia's abortion law is the most permissive in the Middle East and North Africa. It is the only country in the Arab world where abortion is permitted for social grounds, as of 2019, and one of two countries in the Muslim world (alongside Turkey) with abortion on request.

== History ==
=== Colonial-era ban and post-independence advocacy ===
As a colony of France, Tunisia inherited France's abortion law while also being influenced by the Maliki school of Islamic law. A 1913 act based on the Napoleonic Code made it punishable by five years in prison to receive an abortion and ten years to perform an abortion. A 1940 amendment made an exception if the pregnancy risked the life of the mother.

After Tunisian independence, officials supported reform as the country's development policy shifted to favor lower population growth. In the mid 1960s, the pro-abortion movement in Tunisia was motivated by the Malthusian view favoring low population growth, unlike other countries where it was motivated by women's rights. The political elite advocated for abortion and family planning as a way for families to improve their socioeconomic situations. Though the Maliki school viewed that Islam did not allow abortion, the Hanafi and Shafi'i schools did. The first president, Habib Bourguiba thus argued that abortion reform "used the reason inspired by the very principles of Islam".

=== Legalization of abortion ===
Amid the reforms of Bourguiba, Law No. 65-24 was passed in on 1 July 1965, amending Article 214 of the penal code. The amendment allowed therapeutic abortion for married women with five living children, with spousal consent; it was permitted only in the first three months of pregnancy unless medically necessary. The approval of one doctor was required, and some applied the law more liberally, such as allowing abortions based on the number of children of the father rather than the mother. Tunisia was the first country in the Muslim world to liberalize its abortion law, as well as one of the first in Africa. Government facilities began providing abortion for free in 1965, initially only using the dilation and curettage method. The rate of illegal abortion decreased as women receiving abortions produced medical certificates ostensibly giving them permission.

Abortion was decriminalized on 23 September 1973, when the Parliament of Tunisia ratified Bourgiba's presidential decree replacing Article 214. The new law permitted abortion for all women, without spousal consent, and established grounds for abortion after three months. The law occurred after advocacy by the Tunisian Women's Union, which stated, "hundreds of women arrive at the hospital every year suffering from haemorrhage after trying to abort in insanitary conditions," and said that lack of abortion contributed to 55 suicides in 1972. Along with several other laws, it was part of a population policy funded by the Ford Foundation. The law faced little opposition from religious leaders. Bourguiba's support of legalization was backed by national Islamic authorities, who created an interpretation that, according to the main schools of jurisprudence of Sunni Islam, abortion was permitted up to a gestational age of 120 days. Tunisia was the first country to legalize abortion on demand in Africa, the Arab world, or the Muslim world.

In 1973, Tunisia recorded 6,547 abortions. The number of abortions rapidly increased through 1977, when it peaked at 21,162 before a mild decrease. This was correlated with a decrease in maternal mortality. The law also provided legal abortions for young women, which had rarely been reported before 1973. Officials promoted abortion as a form of birth control and, in 1974, aimed for abortion to cause 40% of the decline in birth rate.

=== Family planning program and introduction of medical abortion ===
Beginning in the 1980s, the Office national de la famille et de la population (ONFP) established facilities in each governorate to provide free contraception and abortion. The initial aim of Tunisia's family planning program was to decrease birth rates rather than allow freedom for women. Some women, depending on age or birth parity, were only allowed abortions if they agreed to contraception or forced sterilization. In some cases, surgeons gave patients tubal ligation or intrauterine devices without consent, a practice banned in the late 1990s. The family planning program incentivized such actions; beginning in 1974, Bourguiba awarded funds to governorates with the lowest birth rates. Despite providing abortions, many medical professionals opposed abortion; some subjected patients to unnecessary interviews, while others made the experience unpleasant to discourage patients from returning.

The family planning program was defunded in the 1990s, and the ONFP began focusing on reproductive and sexual health and rights following the International Conference on Population and Development (ICPD). According to ONFP president Nebiha Gueddana, the focus had shifted between birth prevention in the 1960s, birth spacing in the 1970s, maternal and infant health in the 1980s, and reproductive health in the 1990s. In the 2000s, Islamic conservatism gained popularity, affecting the attitudes of reproductive health providers, and conscientious objection to abortion became common. Before this, providers could not object to abortion as the government had higher influence.

The country began testing of medical abortion using mifepristone in 1994, conducted by the World Health Organization, followed by a study in Tunis by the Population Council in 1998. Earlier testing had not occurred as the drug's developer, Roussel-Uclaf, had focused on Europe. An American NGO, Gynuity Health Project, also conducted testing. The legalization of medical abortion faced wide opposition; the National Association of Obstetricians and Gynecologists considered the procedure dangerous, and some judges argued that Article 214 could not allow abortions outside of medical facilities. Some medical professionals opposed the legalization for moral grounds or because they feared it would lower the influence of experts. Officials debated whether unmarried women should be permitted medical abortions. Advocacy from prominent obstetricians and from Gueddana led the government to support legalization. The Ministry of Health approved mifepristone for abortions in November 2001, the first country in Africa to do so. The approval was made through a government circular rather than a change to the law. ONFP launched medical abortion training, and in 2001, ten of its clinics halted surgical abortions in favor of medical abortions. Despite receiving training, most private clinics did not adopt medical abortion because the drugs had to be purchased from the government, which lowered profit.

=== Tunisian Revolution ===
Around 2008, Tunisian regional authorities decreased their focus on reproductive health, and government facilities aimed to perform fewer abortions as the birth rate had fallen. ONFP stopped its medical abortion training as the government deprioritized family planning. The 2008 financial crisis affected the country's medical system leading up to the Tunisian Revolution of 2011. In 2010, 72 public facilities provided abortions, according to the United Nations Population Fund.

Access to abortion declined after the Tunisian Revolution, caused by increasingly conservative social attitudes as well as the economic crisis. ONFP's began facing attacks on its facilities threats against its personnel from Islamists. Public hospitals facing budget cuts stopped providing abortions, which were deemed nonessential. Such cuts primarily occurred in rural areas of the northwest and the south. Medical professionals began employing medical justifications to oppose abortion. A government circular mandated that women be hospitalized for medical abortion; hospitals then began denying the procedure due to a lack of space. Between 2011 and 2012, the number of abortions decreased by 55% in public hospitals and 2% in ONFP clinics. At least ten ONFP clinics had stopped performing the procedure by 2013, despite being legally required. Both public and private providers continued to receive government-funded abortion training, but the government had less control over medical institutions, and providers' behavior differed from the Ministry of Health's guidelines. The ONFP also had institutional disputes, with the leader of the employee union describing the leadership as "a sort of mafia" in 2022.

The ruling party Ennahda called for an abortion ban in January 2013, with a deputy of the party, Najiba Berioul, proposing that the constitution abolish Article 214. She argued that abortion violated fetal rights, a view more common in the Western world. Like other proposals to remove women's rights policies, the attempt to criminalize abortion failed amid protests from the public. The Tunisian Association of Democratic Women, viewed Ennahda's lack of support for abortion as part of a decline in women's rights. The organization criticized the situation in a 2013 booklet, Le droit à l'avortement a Tunisie—1973 à 2013, based on a workshop it had held during a November 2012 meeting of the Coalition for Sexual and Bodily Rights in Muslim Countries. The NGO Groupe Tawhida Ben Chiekh held a flash mob on International Safe Abortion Day 2013 in protest of the proposed abortion ban.

The Tunisian Constitution of 2014 mandated gender equality, and the country fully supported the Convention on the Elimination of All Forms of Discrimination Against Women in 2014, but abortion was not widely viewed as a women's right. The constitution also protected the right to life, which ambiguously supported opposition to abortion. Ennahda leader Rached Ghannouchi said in 2015 that abortion "is an assault against life" but was "possible ... before the development of the fetus". In the 2010s, news sources published accounts of abortion patients who had to travel to find providers. As Ennahda lost power to progressive groups, the government restored support for ONFP. The Minister of Health affirmed the government's support for abortion at a May 2016 conference. Tunisia signed the Maputo Protocol—which provides for a right to abortion—in 2015, under president Beji Caid Essebsi, and ratified it in 2018.

== Prevalence ==
The annual rate of abortions in public facilities in Tunisia was about 17,000 in 2017. The rate of abortions in private facilities is unknown, but a 2011 report estimated it to be 150% to 300% of the rate in public facilities. In 2015, the country had an estimated 14,000 public-sector abortions and 21,000 private-sector abortions. Tunisia has the lowest abortion rate in Africa, the Arab world, or the Muslim world, as of 2008. The abortion rate declined in the 1990s to about 15,000 in 2001. Between the 2000s and 2010s, the number of abortions in public facilities was stagnant while the rate in private facilities increased as some public facilities halted the service. The abortion rate in public facilities increased in 2023, as announced by ONFP.

Medical abortion comprises 75% of abortions in public facilities, as of 2018, It is usually the default method, despite the ONFP Reference Manual's recommendation that patients decide. Most medical abortions are administered at home, as of 2004, and the most common providers are midwives in regional hospitals. The country's first approved regimen uses 200 milligrams of mifepristone. Midwives are also approved to use misoprostol or a combination of the two drugs. A combination pack of the two, Medabon, is approved but not available, as of 2020. Mifepristone is only available in public facilities despite being approved for private facilities. A common method is to use mifepristone at a hospital, then misoprostol at home. Most clinics require both doses to be taken at the clinic as the law does not explicitly permit home abortion. The primary method of surgical abortion is electric vacuum aspiration. Manual vacuum aspiration is rare but is available in Tunis; it is used for early-pregnancy abortions and for dilation and evacuation of failed abortions. Surgical abortions are estimated to be the most common method in private facilities, where the average cost as of 2022 is 300 to 500 dinars (110 to 180 US dollars). Only two public hospitals provide the method, according to the ONFP in 2022.

Public medical facilities provide abortion for free. Private facilities charge high costs, which vary based on conditions such as gestational age. Most wealthy women receiving abortions go to private clinics, which generally have lower requirements for investigation, and they are seen as providing better care. The only public facilities that perform abortions in the second trimester are university hospitals. ONFP clinics use ultrasounds to determine that pregnancies are in the first trimester, though this is not mandated by the ONFP Reference Manual. Under the leadership of Nebiha Gueddana, they only provided abortions up to ten weeks, referring later abortions to regional facilities. As of 2018, regional hospitals lack abortion services and only provide post-abortion care (PAC) through dilation and curettage. Women who request abortions at family planning clinics are required to consult with a psychologist and a gynecologist. Most workers at public facilities are women, and men are seldom present.

Abortion access contributed to a decline in fertility rate and maternal mortality between the 1990s and 2010s. The rate of abortion-related deaths decreased from 2.3% in 1999–2001 to 0.6% (a single case) in 2005–2007. Abortion access has also lowered the incidence of marriage after premarital pregnancy, causing a decline in marriage rate.

=== Societal factors ===
The country has a taboo surrounding abortion, with social expectations that couples have a baby as soon as they get married. Many women are unaware of its availability. The taboo contributes to the popularity of home abortions using traditional or biomedical products. It also causes the press and international organizations to avoid the subject.

Inadequate sexual education in Tunisia contributes to unintended pregnancy. Many Tunisian women are averse to biomedical contraception due to stigma or myths that it causes infertility, sometimes believing abortion to be less harmful. Though premarital sex is common, many women falsely believe their sexual activity prevents pregnancy. Health providers also have negative attitudes or misconceptions about contraception—particularly intrauterine devices, the most common method in the country—which contributes to the need for abortion. Between the 2000s and the 2010s, the rate of contraception use decreased while the abortion rate increased, making abortion the second-most common method of birth control.

Most patients to not disclose to providers why they receive abortions. Common motives for women to have abortions include already having enough children or having an infant, desire to continue work or education, not being married, having a husband who does not want another child, or inability to afford a child due to the high cost of living. Premarital sex is stigmatized, and most unmarried pregnant women receive abortions. However, some are unable to receive abortions in time, leading to abandonment of newborns.

=== Barriers to access ===
Many women are denied legal abortions. Many providers deny abortions without referring patients to other providers. It is also common for health workers in public facilities to direct patients toward their own private facilities for abortion services. In Tunis in 2014, 26% of patients could not receive abortions, including 15% who were told to receive unnecessary tests, 7% who were refused due to gestational age, and 4% who were referred to other facilities.

Abortion is controversial among medical professionals as most do not consider it a right, and they frequently have negative attitudes toward premarital sex. Their views often lead to false interpretations of the law and increased difficulty of access, enabled by the fact that most Tunisian women are unfamiliar with the abortion law as well as the lack of government control over facilities. For example, providers may treat women under 21 as minors, despite a 2010 law lowering the age of majority to 18, or they may require spousal consent, which is a barrier for unmarried women seeking abortions. They may also require tests that are not legally required. Many providers consider post-abortion contraception to be necessary, sometimes requiring abortion patients to accept long-acting methods. Both public and private providers receive training about abortion, but it is often incomplete and it does not address medical abortion. Although the ONFP Reference Manual instructs providers on how to perform abortions, many are unfamiliar with the recommendations.

Many abortion patients face distressing situations at clinics. Medical professionals may purposefully or accidentally give misinformation surrounding medical abortion. Their phrasing may refer to abortion as "killing the baby", returning abortion patients as "recidivists", or unmarried women seeking abortions as "social outcasts". (Note: The term "social outcasts" commonly refers to prostitutes in Tunisia.) Providers subject unmarried women to written interviews about their reasons for abortion, which enables the government to keep track of such cases and embarrasses patients who must answer personal questions. They often read Quranic verses to urge patients to reconsider abortions. Medical professionals who oppose abortion on moral grounds often ignore the concerns of their patients. Non-medical workers at medical facilities may also voice objection to abortion.

Despite abortion being a legal right, women are often unable to receive multiple abortions. If women have previously had abortions, providers may deny them care, especially if they decline contraception, or may give them misinformation about negative health effects. Some providers deny abortion based on marital status, age, or birth parity, believing that a woman should not have fewer than two or three children. Denying abortion to unmarried women is less common in urban areas, where providers are concerned about psychological harm. Second-trimester abortions are often denied without evaluation of whether they are legally permitted.

As paid private providers are more permissive, women who can afford to pay have higher access to abortion. This means that abortion patients at public facilities are likely to be poorer and less educated, and they are often unaware of their legal rights. Many women seek abortions at several public facilities before finding one that will provide it, delaying the procedure. Women in urban areas also have higher access as those in rural areas generally have to travel to providers in cities, which incurs high travel costs and time. Even if providers exist in their cities, it is common for women to travel for abortions to keep it a secret. Women may also travel to Tunisia from countries in the Arab world that lack legal abortion. Groups such as minors and prisoners face barriers to abortion due to having to go through the legal system.

== Debate and activism ==
Islamic opposition to abortion is widespread in Tunisia. Abortion is considered haram by the Maliki school of jurisprudence, which is dominant in the region, as well as other schools that became popular after the Tunisian Revolution. At the time of the 1994 ICPD, most Islamic legal scholars in the country considered abortion up to 120 days permissible, but critics considered them to represent government interests. Despite the common view among Islamic scholars that a fetus is not a human, the belief of many medical providers is that abortion is murder. The position taken by Islamic scholars when abortion was decriminalized was that a fetus does not gain a soul for 120 days, though many Tunisians believe in lower timeframes.

Most feminist organizations in Tunisia to do not prioritize reproductive rights activism. Tunisian groups that advocate for reproductive rights include the prominent feminist organization Tunisian Association of Democratic Women, the reproductive rights NGO Groupe Tawhida Ben Cheikh, and the reproductive rights group Association Amal. International groups that advocate for abortion in Tunisia include International Planned Parenthood Foundation (IPPF) and the United Nations Population Fund. The regional affiliate of IPPF, Association Tunisienne de Santé Reproductive, was founded in 1968 and has six clinics, mostly in southern and western Tunisia. Due to social attitudes, pro-abortion activists may avoid discussing reproductive rights and instead frame abortion as a public health issue.

== See also ==
- Health in Tunisia
- Human rights in Tunisia
