= Abortion in Libya =

Abortion in Libya is illegal except to preserve the life of the mother. People who conduct or receive abortions may be imprisoned, with shortened sentences in cases such as pregnancy from rape. Initially inheriting an abortion ban from Italy, Libya made abortion a criminal offense under Muammar Gaddafi, with a 1986 law including an exception for life-saving abortions. The country has opposed the right to abortion, including at the International Conference on Population and Development; it is also a party to the Maputo Protocol, which includes a right to abortion. The country has a taboo surrounding abortion and lacks safe abortion guidelines. Women often travel to receive legal abortions in Tunisia.

== Legislation ==
The penal code of Libya prohibits abortion in articles 390 to 395. It sets prison sentences of up to six years for providing a non-consensual abortion and at least six months for providing, receiving, or self-inducing a consensual abortion, with higher sentences if the procedure results in injury or death. These sentences are halved if the abortion is performed by a medical professional or if it is done "for the preservation of the honor of the offender or one of his kindred", which includes cases of pregnancy from rape. Prison sentences are enforced. The country's health law permits abortions if the pregnancy risks the life of the mother. Such abortions require the approval of a medical specialist and an ordinance about what action to take. The law does not specify what qualifies as life-saving. Libya's abortion law is more restrictive than the sharia-based abortion law of Saudi Arabia.

== History ==
During the colonial era, Libya's abortion law was based on that of Italy, which banned the procedure except to preserve the life of the mother. This was superseded by a 1973 health law with the same terms. The government of Muammar Gaddafi made abortion a criminal offense. The Act of Medical Responsibility (Law 17 of 1986), passed on 3 November 1986, stated that abortion was illegal "unless it is absolutely necessary to save the mother's life". At the time, procuring an abortion was punishable by nine months of prison.

Libya allied with other entities opposing access to abortion, including the United States at the time of the 1984 Mexico City Conference and the Catholic Church ahead of the 1994 International Conference on Population and Development. Libya's representatives were vocal about this stance at the latter conference, where they expressed a reservation to the article providing a right to abortion, noting that this differed from the country's law, and concurred with Jordan's delegation in support of Islamic abortion law. Libya was one of the first ten countries to sign the Maputo Protocol, which includes a right to abortion. It also signed the Geneva Consensus Declaration, a statement by the administration of US President Donald Trump opposing the right to abortion, in 2020. In a 2025 statement about its actions against foreign NGOs, the Internal Security Agency said that Doctors Without Borders had been conducting abortion trainings without approval of authorities.

== Prevalence ==
Libya had 117,050 abortions between 1995 and 2000. During this period, 190 cases of abortion-related death occurred. According to the Guttmacher Institute, 64% of reproductive-aged women in Libya have an unmet need for contraception, which contributes to abortions. The country does not have abortion care guidelines. Misoprostol is approved for post-abortion care and postpartum hemorrhage, but not for abortion. Abortion is a taboo subject in Libya. Many Libyan women travel to receive the procedure in other countries, such as neighboring Tunisia, where it is legal.
