= Abortion in Niger =

In Niger, abortion is illegal except in the cases of risk to life, health or fetal defects. Legal abortions require physician approval, which health facilities only permit in the case of risk to life. Illegal abortions are punishable by imprisonment or fines. Niger inherited France's abortion law of 1939, which completely banned abortion, though Niger permitted life-saving abortions as a legal principle. In 2006, abortions were legalized on the grounds of risk to life, risk to health, and fetal defects. Abortion-rights movements have not been active in the country.

The overwhelming majority of abortions are unsafe, and the rate of fatal abortions is high. Abortions are mostly self-induced using abortion pills, abortifacient plants and substances, or actions believed to harm pregnancies. In traditional medicine, abortion is conceptualized as the return of menstruation. Legal abortions use surgical methods. Many Nigerien women receive abortions in Benin or other neighboring countries. Abortion is commonly used to avoid teenage pregnancy, to avoid unwanted marital expectations, or as a form of birth control when other methods are not available. Post-abortion care has been available from public facilities since 2001 but is uncommonly used. Abortion is a stigmatized subject in the country, with cases being widely condemned, and Islamic opposition to abortion is common.

== Legislation ==
The penal code of Niger prohibits abortion. A reproductive health law legalizes abortions if the pregnancy risks the life or health of the mother or birth defects, requiring the approval of a group of physicians. The law does not specify how many physicians are required, though the medical code of ethics of ECOWAS (which is not an official document) requires the provider of the procedure to get the approval of two additional physicians, and the penal code also requires the approval of two additional physicians. Formal health facilities only provide abortion when physicians consider it necessary to save a life.

Article 295 of the penal code says providing an illegal abortion is punishable by a fine of 50,000 to 500,000 francs and a prison sentence of one to five years, which is increased to five to ten years for habitual offenders or for abortions performed on minors. Self-induced abortion is punishable by a prison sentence of six months to two years and a fine of 20,000 to 200,000 francs. Under Articles 296 and 297, professionals who recommend or enable abortions may receive the same punishment and have their licenses suspended. According to ethnographer Hadiza Moussa in 2012, abortion cases do not face criminal prosecution. However, a 2002 report by the Office of the United Nations High Commissioner for Human Rights said that prison sentences were enforced.

== History ==
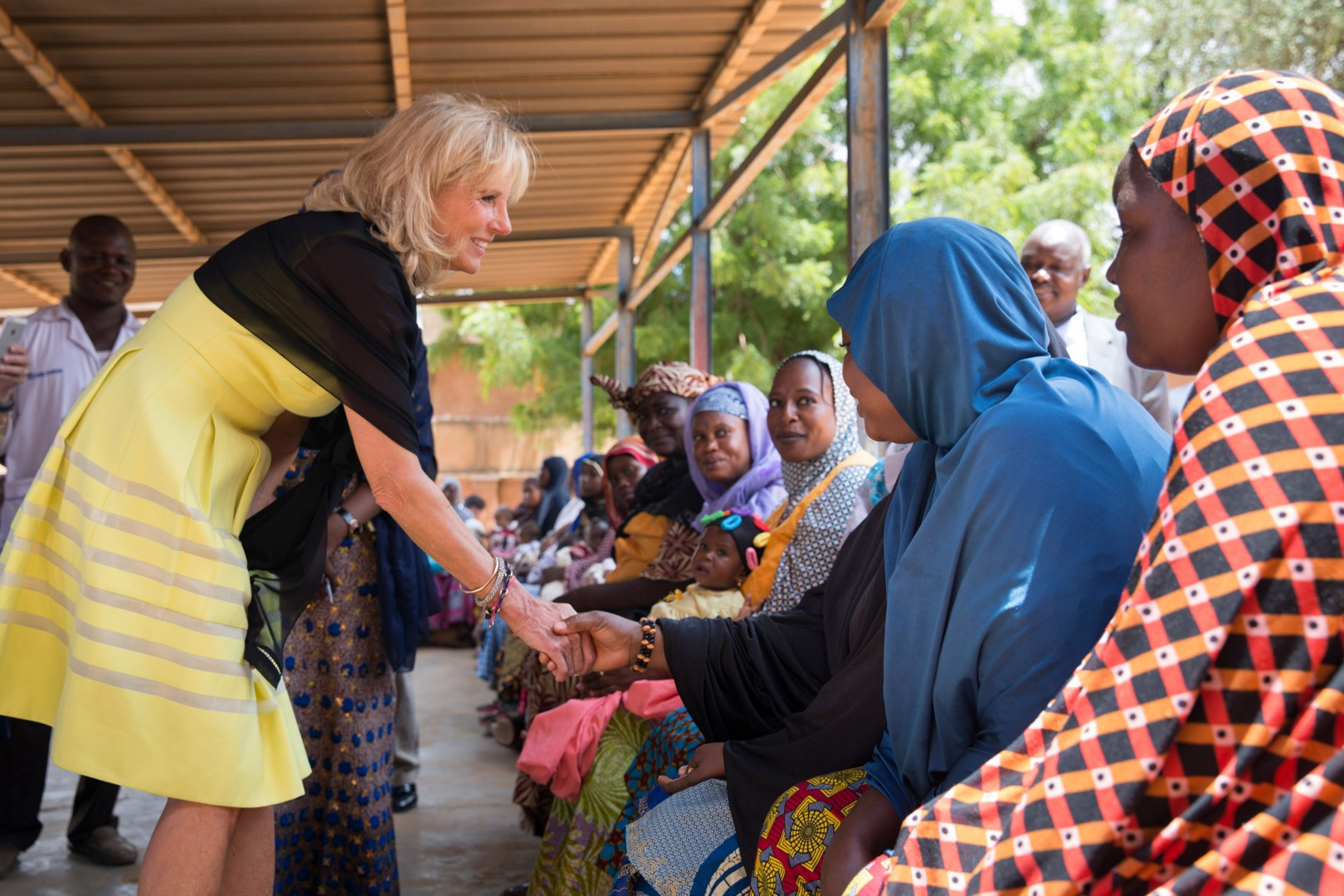
MSI Reproductive Choices opened a clinic in Niamey in 2016 (pictured with the Second Lady of the United States, Jill Biden)

Niger's abortion law was originally based on that of France, banning abortion. The 1939 amendment to Article 317 of the French Penal Code was adopted by Niger. Niger's criminal law established that life-saving abortions were permitted under the defense of necessity. Prosecution of abortion peaked during the authoritarian government of Seyni Kountché. During his administration, Islamic arguments in support of abortion were supported by figures including Alkassoum Albahaki of the Niger Islamic Council. Such arguments faded from prominence after the increase in Islamism in the 1990s. Legal grounds for abortion were introduced in 2006. The British reproductive health NGO MSI Reproductive Choices, which aims to prevent of unsafe abortion, began operating in Niger in 2013, on the invitation of the Ministry of Health, and opened a clinic in Niamey in 2016. The Ministry of Health ordered the closure of MSI's two clinics in November 2018, saying an investigation had found evidence of illegal abortions at the Niamey clinic. The clinics reopened in September 2019. The country has not had activist movements advocating for legal abortion.

== Prevalence ==
In 2015–2019, the estimated annual number of abortions in Niger was 69,000, equating to 31% of unintended pregnancies or 5% of all pregnancies. The abortion rate had remained stagnant since 1990–1994, during which time the unintended pregnancy rate had decreased by 12%. Another estimate found that the abortion rate in 2021 was about 7 per 1,000 women of reproductive age, or 36,800 cases. A study by Performance Monitoring for Action (PMA) and the National Statistics Institute of Niger (INS) said that there were 27,504 abortions in 2022, a rate of 5 per 1,000. There is little research on the prevalence of abortion in the country due to its illegality.

As of 2021, over nine-tenths of abortions are unsafe, and about half use methods not recommended by the World Health Organization. A 2009 study of 151 post-abortion care patients in Niamey found that 85% required hospitalization and 8% died as a result. According to the Global Burden of Disease Study, the country's death rate of abortion (including miscarriage) between 1990 and 2025 was 14.02 per 100,000 people, the second-highest of any country.

Many abortions use abortion pills or traditional methods. Traditional medicine in Niamey views abortion as a technique to bring back menstruation, which requires the consumption of harmful substances, such as ingredients that are excessively sour, sweet, bitter, or hot. Self-induced abortions often involve actions that are traditionally believed to be dangerous for pregnant women, such as heavy lifting, putting pressure on the belly, eating certain foods, or bloodletting. Other self-induced abortion methods include a beverage brewed from indigo; vaginal insertion of millet branches; enemas with caustic substances such as potassium permanganate, ginger, or chili; doughs made of powdered plants to be inserted against the cervix; or tampons soaked with acids, bleach, or permanganate. Plants used as abortifacients include neem and Khaya senegalensis, and they are sometimes mixed with sweet substances such as cola. Abortions may also use medications such as aspirin, the antimalarial Nivaquine, or multi-drug capsules known as toupaille, which may be combined with each other. Other products used for abortions include soap, saffron, and henna. In Niamey, red products are often favored for abortions due to color symbolism. Abortion drugs are sometimes sold by akwaku, pharmaceutical street vendors in Niamey, which operate outside of formal medical systems. According to Hadiza Moussa, Niger is not known to have dedicated illegal abortion providers, as known in other African countries as "angel makers", and most abortions are self-induced.

Legal abortions typically use surgical abortion using curettage. Abortions at medical facilities often also involve oxytocin for inducing labor, which is commonly prescribed, even when unnecessary, due to its ease of use and to charge additional costs to patients. Medical abortion using misoprostol or mifepristone has not been tested in the country. Many women seek abortions in neighboring countries, where discreet abortion services are widely available. Women from Niamey most commonly receive abortions in Malanville, Benin, where medical professionals have private practices to provide abortions to mostly Nigerien patients.

=== Societal factors ===
Niger has a strong stigma against abortion. The country's predominantly Muslim population widely adheres to the view that abortion is against their religion, considering it murder or a violation of fetal rights. Islamic interpretations in the country typically only permit abortions if the pregnancy threatens the life of the mother or fetus. Views opposing abortion lead to criticism and suspicion that married women have had abortions, though cases of abortion are largely unknown to the public. The illegality of abortion contributes to a lack of discussion of the subject, while cases that are discussed are often reported with sensationalism. Terms used for abortion tend to describe it as an intentional offense, such as the phrase "pouring out the belly" (Zarma: gunde mun yan, Hausa: zubda ciki). Unlike abortions, miscarriages are seen with sympathy, being attributed to health problems or evil forces such as jinn.

Niger has the world's highest fertility rate and lowest rate of unintended pregnancy, as of 2023, causing a low demand for abortion. However, abortions commonly occur, but cases are unreported or kept secret. Abortions rates are highest among women who are young, educated, or have not had children. This is similar to other countries in the region, which have higher abortion rates. The 2022 study by PMA and INS found that the most common factor motivating abortions is marital problems, followed by unmarried status and health reasons.

Abortion is common among girls in school, as teenage pregnancy is stigmatized and, in the 1970s and 1980s, could have resulted in expulsion from school and a legal case against the father. Many schools report attempts to remove fetuses in school restrooms. Girls in school are often motivated to commit abortion or infanticide to protect their honor when the father does not wish to legitimize the child. A 2007 study of 488 high schoolers found that 58% knew people who had had abortions, few of which were from medical professionals. Abortion is also common among married women, motivated by failure of or lack of access to birth control. Married women often claim abortions to be miscarriages. Abortions are also common among women who are in forced marriages or other marital situations they dislike, thus rejecting social expectations to bear children for their husbands. Other abortions are motivated by the lack of legal recognition of illegitimate children. Abortion as a form of birth control is common in Niamey as it is difficult to obtain birth control methods. Married women in the city often seek abortions for this purpose without seeking help from social networks.

== Post-abortion care ==
Unlike abortion, post-abortion care (PAC) involves formal medical providers. PAC was introduced to the country in 2001 as a "lifesaving safe motherhood intervention" in Niamey. Expansion of PAC in following decades was slow, with the instability of the Ministry of Health being a factor. A majority of women who have abortions do not seek PAC, due to lack of access, lack of knowledge, or risk of social or legal consequences. The management of PAC is decentralized, as part of Niger's public healthcare system, which is managed through three tiers of public hospitals. Many healthcare facilities in Niger have the capacity for limited PAC services, with poor or rural areas having lower access.

== See also ==
- Abortion in Africa
- Human rights in Niger
- Women in Niger
