= Abortion in Afghanistan =

Abortion is illegal in Afghanistan unless the life of the mother is at risk or the baby's life is endangered, interpreted as the baby having a severe disability or low quality of life. Afghanistan has one of the highest fertility rates in the world, but its levels are decreasing since the fall of the Taliban, as aid workers can now enter the country to help with fertility and decrease mortality rates. In turn, legislation on abortion is influenced by Islamic law.

== Birthrates and fertility ==
Afghanistan has one of the highest fertility rates in the world, with very few women actively using contraceptive methods, despite support from the government and conformance with religious ethics. Only 22.5% of people utilize contraceptive measures in comparison to the United States, where 74.1% of people utilize contraception. In the 1990s, the average woman in Afghanistan had 8 children throughout her lifetime, but this decreased in the mid-2000s to 6.3 and by the end of 2010 to 5.1.

Since the Taliban's fall in 2001, fertility levels decreased. The decreased presence of the Taliban has allowed an entrance of aid workers to the country to provide educational funding for schools, family planning, and more access to birth control. The uncontrolled high fertility rates make it difficult for Afghanistan to manage the poverty level and improve other social conditions, which leaves a high dependence on aid from other countries. High fertility rates cause high birthrates, which contribute to the high fetal mortality rate. Afghanistan has the highest fetal mortality rate in the world, with 110.6 deaths per 1000 births. Mothers are 19.9 years old on average at their first births. As access to education across Afghanistan is increasing due to the fall of the Taliban, the fetal mortality rate is also decreasing. In rural areas the mortality rate still remains high, but aid workers are being sent to many regions of the country after receiving training on deliveries and care for newborns.

== Current legislation ==
Afghan legislation is based heavily on Islamic views on abortion. Article 3 of Chapter 1 outlines that no law in Afghanistan should contradict Islam. The Afghan Independent Human Rights Commission was created to protect human rights and as a response to Shia Family Law, which violates human rights. The heavy influence of religious beliefs on the law leads to strict laws surrounding abortion. Chapter 4 of the Afghanistan Penal Code outlines the consequences for performing abortions. It states that abortions are illegal unless the life of the mother is at risk or the baby's life is endangered, interpreted as the baby having a severe disability or low quality of life. Article 402 says that anyone who purposefully kills a fetus will be sentenced to no more than seven years in prison. Article 403 says that anyone who performs the abortion will either be imprisoned or fined up to approximately 12,000 Afghanis (US$165). If the person performing the abortion is a doctor they will be punished to the fullest extent of the law.

== Access to abortions ==
Few legal cases allow women to seek abortion care. Women are able to get an abortion when their life is endangered by the pregnancy, or if the baby will be born with severe deformities or disabilities. Religious ethical committees must rule on the ethics and legality of the abortion before it can be carried out. After ethical approval of the abortion, the woman must obtain approval from a gynecologist, three general practitioners, a counselor, and permission of the doctor. One additional situation that occasionally allows abortion to occur is poverty. This is especially prominent in areas that the Taliban is still present in. Within Taliban controlled areas, poverty based abortions are generally approved more often because they have too many children.

Women often pursue abortions through illegal means because of the few cases that allow abortions legally. They believe it is necessary in order to avoid shame from their husbands, families, and society. This leads women to having to fund the abortion themselves, which can be difficult because of the social norm that it is women's job to have children and thus they do not have jobs outside of taking care of the house and the family. Many women would prefer not to have children, but lack knowledge on how to limit the number of children they have outside of abortion. When pursuing abortions, they many times need to use uneducated midwives who do not know how to properly perform the procedure or deal with complications. Another option they have is to use expensive private clinics, which leads to the issue of funding the expenditure. Since women are typically unemployed, rounding up the funds for an abortion can be difficult. The price of an abortion has decreased from 250,000 Afghanis (US$3,500) to 17,500 Afghanis (US$250). This decrease has been seen because of the increasing need of abortions. But the price is still 15,000 Afghani (US$150) higher than the average price of an abortion in the United States, where before June 24 2022 abortions were legal and generally publicly accepted.

=== Safety of the procedure ===
Afghanistan is in the top 16 countries worldwide for the highest mortality rate from abortion. The healthcare system in Afghanistan is also not at a level to properly care for pregnant mothers. Every two hours there is a pregnancy-related death in Afghanistan. The high maternal mortality is due to lack of post procedure care. Although the procedure is illegal in most cases, women still pursue abortions, motivating aid workers to make it safer. International aid workers are working to improve the safety of the procedures by educating midwives and nurses about how to improve care for their patients and limit mortality from the procedure. Aid workers hope to decrease the stigma surrounding the procedure so that there is lower mortality.
