= Duros =

Duros can refer to:

- Duros (Star Wars), an alien race in the Star Wars franchise.
- Duros (food), a crisp Mexican snack made of hardened wheat flour that has been deep fried.
- DUROS, a drug delivery platform

== See also ==
- Duro (disambiguation)
