= Soma (Skrillex album) =

Studio album by Skrillex
- Released: June 5, 2026
- Recorded: 2020–2026
- Genres: Brazilian funk; techno; trance; Miami bass; dubstep; tech house
- Length: 42:15
- Labels: Owsla; Atlantic
- Producers: Blawan; DJ 2K Do Taquaril; Dismantle; ISOxo; Chris Lake; Nitepunk; Randomer; Rom; Skrillex; Tracey

Skrillex chronology
| Kora (2026) | Soma (2026) |

Singles from Soma
- 1. "Duro" Released: March 27, 2026; 2. "Smoke" Released: May 1, 2026; 3. "Thistle" Released: May 29, 2026

Soma (stylized as SOMA) is the fifth studio album by American record producer Skrillex. It was released on June 5, 2026, through Owsla as a surprise album.

Similarly to his fourth album, 2025's Fuck U Skrillex You Think Ur Andy Warhol but Ur Not!!, the album hosts a wide variety of collaborators including Nitepunk, Randomer, Blawan, ISOxo, Chris Lake, Naisha, and Young Miko. Sonically, the album covers a broad variety of genres, like Brazilian funk, techno, trance, Miami bass, dubstep and tech house. The album additionally includes elements of experimental trap, UK bass, breakbeat, and hard groove. The album received a nomination for Best Dance/Electronic Album at the 69th Grammy Awards.

== Background ==
All tracks from this album except for "Tranki" had been previously unreleased IDs that appeared in live sets since 2023 at the earliest.

"Anybody", the second of his two collaborations on the project with ISOxo, began as a trap song that was used as the opening track to a surprise back-to-back set between Skrillex and ISO at OMFG! NYE, a now-defunct New Year's Eve music festival ran by LED Presents.

The title track, "Soma" began similarly to serve as the opening track for Skrillex's return to Ultra Music Festival Miami in March 2025 and is Skrillex's opener for nearly every single set since then.

== Track listing ==
Soma track listing
| No. | Title | Writer(s) | Producer(s) | Length |
|---|---|---|---|---|
| 1. | "Soma" (with Nitepunk) | Skrillex; Andy Ezrin; Jody Gray; Nitepunk | Skrillex; Nitepunk | 3:24 |
| 2. | "Thistle" (with Randomer, Blawan, and MC Dricka) | Skrillex; Rayanne Mello de Carvalho; Fernanda Nascimento Dos Santos; Jamie Roberts; William Robinson; Rohan Walder | Skrillex; Blawan; Randomer | 3:55 |
| 3. | "Tranki" (with Tracey, Taichu, and Anita B Queen) | Skrillex; Ana Kim; Tais López Miranda; Charles Stooke; Elena Ware | Skrillex; Tracey | 3:18 |
| 4. | "Smoke" (with ISOxo, Cristale, and TeeZandos) | Skrillex; Shante Bailey; Andrew Bradford; Jahrell Bryan; Haldane Browne; Cristale De' Abreu; Héctor Delgado Román; Lucien Dixon; Julian Isorena; Omar Preece; Valentino Salvi; Wallace Wilson | Skrillex; ISOxo | 2:30 |
| 5. | "Noche Without You" (with Feid) | Skrillex; Roberto Concina; Sylvester Sivertsen; Salomón Villada Hoyos; Rami Yacoub | Skrillex; Sly Sylvester^{[a]} | 3:23 |
| 6. | "Scut 2" (with Rom) | Skrillex; Jeong DongWhee | Skrillex; rom | 2:58 |
| 7. | "Cheeni" (with Naisha) | Skrillex; Naisha Barghabi; Dilip Venkatesh | Skrillex | 3:05 |
| 8. | "Pente Rala" (with Dismantle, DJ 2K Do Taquaril, and MC Dricka) | Skrillex; Drew Gold; Will Knighton; Marcos Lima Dos Santos; Nascimento Dos Santos; Jyoty Singh | Skrillex; DJ 2K Do Taquaril; Dismantle | 3:39 |
| 9. | "É o Bonde" (with Chris Lake and RHR) | Skrillex; Chris Lake; Roniere Santos | Skrillex; Lake | 4:42 |
| 10. | "La Noche 2" (with Chris Lake and Anita B Queen) | Skrillex; Kim; Lake | Skrillex | 2:24 |
| 11. | "Anybody" (with ISOxo) | Skrillex; Charlotte Aitchison; Marlon Barrow; Alexander Guy Cook; Jae Deal; Pablo Díaz-Reixa; Jasoer Harris; Isorena; Finn Keane; Caroline Polachek | Skrillex; ISOxo; Reece Weinberg^{[a]} | 2:42 |
| 12. | "Duro" (with Young Miko) | Skrillex; Abner Boria; Ahad Elley; Diego López; María Ramírez de Arellano Cardona | Skrillex | 3:04 |
| 13. | "Diwali" (with Naisha and Beam) | Skrillex; Barghabi; Tyshane Thompson | Skrillex | 3:06 |
| Total length: | | | | 42:15 |

=== Note ===
- ^{^[a]} indicates an additional producer

== Personnel ==
Credits are adapted from Tidal.

- Skrillex – instruments, programming, engineering, mixing, mastering
- Reece Weinberg – engineering
- Drew Gold – engineering (1–8, 10–13)
- Nitepunk – instruments, programming, engineering (1)
- Blawan – programming, engineering (2)
- Randomer – programming, engineering (2)
- ISOxo – mixing, mastering (2, 4); instruments (4, 11), programming (4, 11), engineering (4)
- MC Dricka – vocals (2, 8)
- Tracey – instruments, programming (3)
- Tom Norris – mixing, mastering (5, 10, 12, 13); additional engineering (4)
- Feid – vocals (5)
- Rom – instruments, programming, engineering (6)
- Naisha – vocals (7)
- DJ 2K Do Taqauuril – instruments, programming (8)
- Dismantle – instruments, programming (8)
- Chris Lake – instruments, programming (9, 10); engineering (9)
- RHR – vocals (9)
- Young Miko – vocals (12)
- Mauro – engineering (12)
- Alex Ghenea – mixing (12)
- Knock2 – mixing (13)
- Victor Verpillat – mixing assistance (13)

== Charts ==
Chart performance for Soma
| Chart (2026) | Peak position |
|---|---|
| UK Album Downloads (Official Charts) | 79 |
| UK Dance Albums (Official Charts) | 4 |
| US Top Dance Albums (Billboard) | 23 |
| US World Albums (Billboard) | 10 |
