= Tunisian franc =

Former Tunisian currency (1891–1958)

فرنك تونسي (Arabic)
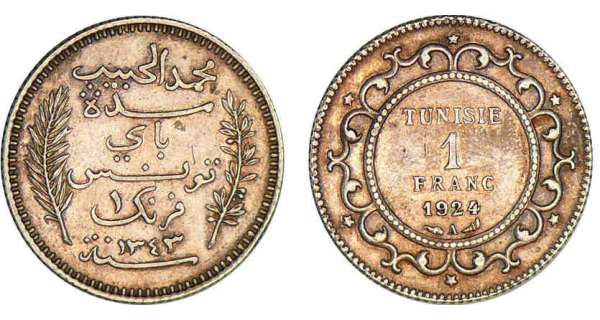
- Tunisian franc 1924

Unit
- Symbol: F

Denominations
- Subunit
- 1/100: centime (صنتيم)
- Banknotes: 500, 1000, 5000 francs
- Coins: 50 centimes, 1, 2, 5, 20, 50, 100 francs

Demographics
- User(s): Tunisia

Issuance
- Central bank: Banque de l'Algérie et de la Tunisie
- This infobox shows the latest status before this currency was rendered obsolete.

The franc (French, Arabic: فرنك) was the currency of Tunisia between 1891 and 1958. It was divided into 100 centimes (صنتيم) and was equivalent to the French franc.

== History ==
The franc replaced the rial in 1891 at the rate of 1 rial = 60 centimes. It consisted of both coins and banknotes produced specifically for Tunisia, although early banknotes were Algerian issues overstamped with "Tunisie". The franc was replaced in 1960 by the dinar at a rate of 1000 francs = 1 dinar, the dinar having been established as the unit of account in 1958.

== Coins ==
The first coins denominated in francs were issued in 1887, before the franc became the currency of Tunisia. These were gold 25 rial coins which were also marked "15 F" to indicate their value in French francs. In 1891, bronze 1, 2, 5 and 10 centimes, silver 50 centimes, 1 and 2 francs, and gold 10 and 20 francs were introduced, all equal in size and composition to the corresponding French coins. The 1 and 2 centimes were only issued that year.

In 1918, holed, nickel-bronze 5, 10 and 25 centimes were introduced, followed, in 1921, by aluminium-bronze 50 centimes, 1 and 2 francs and silver 10 and 20 francs in 1930. Again, these coins matched the French coins in size and composition. However, in 1934, silver 5 francs coins were introduced, despite the French 5 francs being made of nickel. As in France, zinc 10 and 20 centimes coins were introduced during the Second World War with silver coins discontinued.

Production of coins below 5 francs ceased in 1945, with an aluminium-bronze 5 francs introduced in 1946, followed by cupro-nickel 20, 50 and 100 francs in 1950 and a cupro-nickel 5 francs in 1954. These four cupro-nickel coins were last struck in 1957.

== Banknotes ==
In 1903, the Banque de l'Algérie introduced 5 franc notes with the overprint "Tunisie". These were followed by 500 francs in 1904, 20, 50 and 10 francs in 1908 and 1000 franc notes in 1918. Between 1918 and 1921, the "Regence de Tunis" issued notes for 50 centimes, 1 and 2 francs. The bank introduced 5000 franc notes in 1942, whilst the "Direction des Finance" issued 50 centime, 1 and 2 franc notes in 1943. The last 5 franc notes were issued in 1944.

In 1946, the name of the bank changed to the Banque de l'Algérie et de la Tunisie. Notes were issued for Tunisia in denominations of 20, 50, 100, 500, 1000 and 5000 francs, with the 20, 50 and 100 franc notes being replaced by coins in 1950.

== See also ==
- Economy of Tunisia
- Tunisian dinar
- Carthaginian shekel
- Tunisian rial
