= Ibn Rachiq =

- Born: Around 1000; M’Sila, In Ifriqiya
- Died: October 15, 1064
- Occupations: Writer, Poet

Ibn Rachik or Ibn Rachiq, from his full name Abū ʿAlī Ḥasan Ibn Rašīq alias al-Kairwānī or al-Masili (Arabic : ابن رشيق القيرواني), born around 1000 (390 of the Islamic calendar) (now M'Sila In Ifriqiya) and died October 15 died in Mazara, Sicily (modern-day Italy), 1064, was a writer, literary theorist, anthologist and a poet.

== Life ==
He grew up in Mohammediyya and studied while learning his father's craft: jewellery. He was interested in literature and wrote his early poems. It is then decided to return to Kairouan, capital of science and knowledge of the time, in 1015. There are often the great masters and scientists of the time, like Mohamed Ibn Ja'far al- Kazzaz Temimī and Abū Isḥāq Ibrahīm al-Ḥuṣari, and deepen his knowledge with them. At the same time, he dealt with commercial activities.

In 1026, he contacted the Zirid court by eulogizing the ruler of Al-Muʿizz ben Badis who appreciated the extent of his knowledge and his literary talent. He quickly became the palace's official poet, while expanding his area of interest in the history of literature and developing his skills in criticism and poetic art theory.

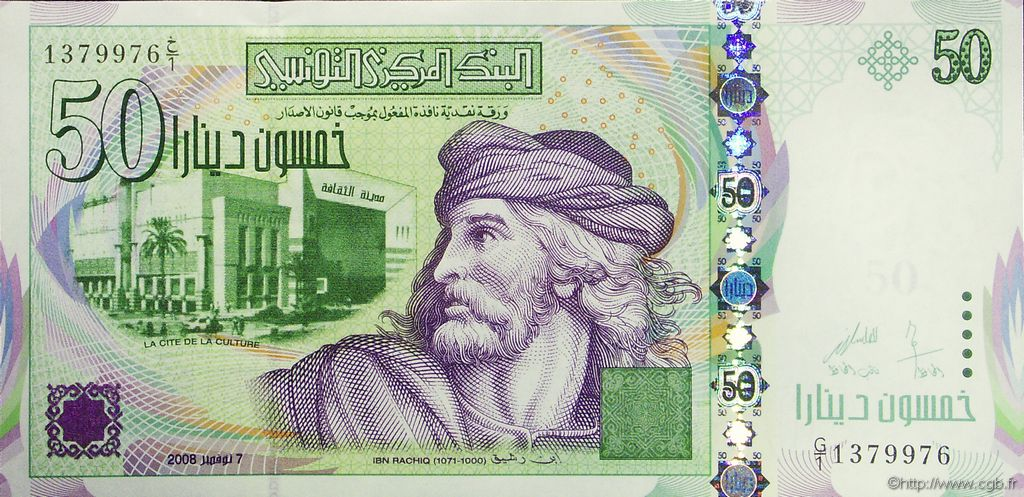
Portrait of Ibn Rachik on a fify Tunisian dinar bill mis put into circulation July 25, 2009.

In 1051, he composed the satire of the judge of the city of Sabra (also called El Mansouria), which was deemed worthy to be exiled; he fled to Egypt. Upon his return, he attended the decay of Kairouan caused by the endless struggles that bring Al-Mu'izz ben Badis to settle in Mahdia. Taking advantage of this event, Ibn Rachik wrote a new eulogy in honor of the caliph, but this has the opposite effect to that hoped because the poem begins with "Do not give in and have no trouble", which is considered as an undermining the prestige of the caliph.

Ibn Rachik was then exiled to Mazara (Sicily) in 1057. According to some sources, he remained there until his death on October 15, 1064, but it seems more likely that he returned to Mahdia since he wrote the elegy funeral of the ruler Al-Mu'izz ben Badis, then later the eulogy of his son Tamim ben al-Muʿizz.

== Legacy ==
The portrait of Ibn Rachik on a fifty Tunisian dinar bill was put into circulation July 25, 2009.

== Works ==
- Available works:
  - Al Onmudhaj (أنموذج الزمان في شعراء القيروان);
  - Al Omda (العمدة في محاسن الشعر و آدابه);
  - Al Qaradha (قراضة الذهب في نقد أشعار العرب);
- Available works:
  - Twenty works of ontology, criticism and literary history, as well as a collection of poems;
  - Eight articles and letters of criticism and debate, especially against his rival Ibn Charaf.

== Sources ==
- Mohamed Laroussi Métoui et Béchir Baccouche, introduction à l'ouvrage Al Onmoudhaj, éd. Maison tunisienne de l'édition, Tunis, 1986
