= Tunisian rial =

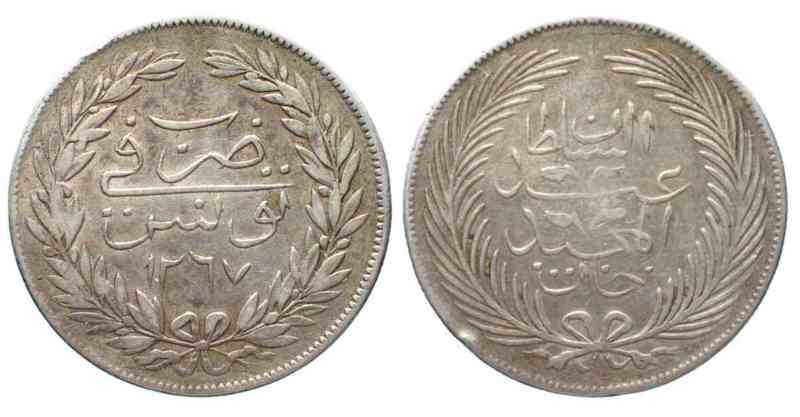
Coin of Abdülmecid I dating 1850 AD

The rial (French: rial sebili) or piastre was the currency of Tunisia until 1891. It was subdivided into 16 kharub (caroub), each of 13 fals (burbe). The fals was further subdivided into 6 qafsi (burben). The nasri (asper) was worth 2 fals. The denomination was often either not given on coins or only indicated by a numeral. Some rial denominated coins have a numeral over the Arabic letter r, ر.

== History ==
The rial was issued by the Beys of Tunis. Although known as the piastre by Europeans, it was not equal to the Turkish kuruş, also known as the piastre. From 1855, the rial was on a bimetallic standard of 1 rial = 0.17716 grams pure gold or 2.7873 grams pure silver. In 1887, the gold content of the 25 rial coin was slightly reduced to make it equivalent to 15 French francs. In 1891, this conversion rate (more conveniently expressed as 1 rial = 60 centimes) was used when the Tunisian franc replaced the rial.

== Coins ==
In the early 19th century, copper 1 fals coins were issued, together with billon 1 nasri, 1, 2, 4 and 8 kharub, 1 and 2 rial, and gold sultani. A new coinage was introduced in 1847, consisting of copper 1 fals, 1 nasri, 1/2 and 1 kharub and silver 2 and 5 rial denominations. Between 1856 and 1858, copper coins for 3, 6 and 13 nasri were issued along with silver 2, 4 and 8 kharub, 1, 3 and 4 rial, and gold 10, 20, 25, 40, 50, 80 and 100 rial. The gold coins were initially struck in pure gold, later reduced to .900 fineness, with the 20, 40 and 80 rial denominations short-lived. The 6 and 13 nasri coins were later overstamped with the Arabic numerals "1" and "2" ("١" and "٢") to indicate that they were to circulate as 1 and 2 kharub coins, an increase in value of ½ nasri for the 6 nasri coin. In 1864, a new copper coinage was introduced in denominations of 1/4, 1/2, 1, 2, 4, 8 kharub. Silver 8 kharub and gold 5 rial were also introduced. In 1887, the slightly smaller 25 rial coins were introduced (see above), with the additional inscription "15 F" to indicate the equivalence to the French franc.

== See also ==
- Tunisian dinar
- Carthaginian coinage
- Tunisian franc
