= Duro (song) =

2026 single by Skrillex featuring Young Miko

Single by Skrillex featuring Young Miko

from the album Soma
- Released: March 27, 2026
- Genre: Trance; hyperpop
- Length: 3:04
- Label: Owsla; Atlantic
- Songwriters: Sonny Moore; Abner Boria; Ahad Elley; Diego López; María Ramírez de Arellano Cardona
- Producer: Skrillex

Skrillex singles chronology
"Hit Me Where It Hurts XX" (2025)	"Duro" (2026)	"Smoke" (2026)

Visualizer
- "Duro" on YouTube

"Duro" is a song by American record producer Skrillex featuring Puerto Rican rapper Young Miko. It was released on March 27, 2026 as the lead single from his fifth studio album, Soma (2026).

== Background ==
The song was played for years as an unknown ID, with the first highly televised performance occurring at Ultra Music Festival 2025, where Young Miko joined him on stage to perform the track. Before its release, the song was known to be called "Apaga La Luz" due to the words spoken in the chorus, with the name dating all the way back to Lollapalooza 2024 where Skrillex played the song.

== Promotion ==
Young Miko announced the eventual release of the track during her performance at Festival Estéreo Picnic, with Skrillex secretly doing the same during his live shows at Lollapalooza Chile, Lollapalooza Brazil, and Lollapalooza Argentina using a QR code visual.

== Critical reception ==
The Honey Pop called the song "a good time" and said, "Even if you’re not a big fan of EDM and dance music, we need you to take a listen to Duro". Stereogum described the song as "frenetic Sonny Moore production that gets a lot of mileage out of laser synths". EDMTunes said of the song, "Skrillex’s willingness to work outside traditional electronic music circles has kept him relevant across multiple genres, from dubstep and bass music to pop and now Latin urbano".

== Charts ==
Chart performance for "Duro"
Chart (2026)	Peak position
El Salvador Anglo Airplay (Monitor Latino)	5
US Hot Dance/Electronic Songs (Billboard)	21
