= Nebiha Gueddana =

Tunisian politician

- Born: Nebiha Ben Aissa
- Occupations: Physician and politician

Nebiha Gueddana or Nabiha Gueddana, maiden name Ben Aissa, born January 26, 1949, is a doctor and a Tunisian politician. She held several high-level positions at the national and international level.

== Scientific career ==
Nébiha Gueddana holds a Diploma in the field of paediatrics from the University René Descartes of the Academy of Paris. She is Professor of medicine specialised in preventive and social paediatrics at the medical school in Tunis and she holds a diploma in statistics applied to medicine, with epidemiology as a minor, from the Centre of Statistics applied to medicine and biology at the University of Paris VI. She held the position of junior lecturer in a teaching hospital and head of department in Tunis Children's Hospital and taught courses at the medical school of Tunis.

== Public servant ==
Nominated, respectively, Deputy Minister in charge of social affairs, women and the family from 1989 to 1993, and President of the Commission for the Equality of Opportunities and Law Enforcement (1997–2000) and member of Women and Family High Council, she has made a name for herself by the role of leadership in the promotion of women's rights: gender, the empowerment of women, participation in political decision making and economic participation and the integration of the concept gender in development plans.

She held the position of Deputy Minister in charge of social affairs, then Deputy Minister in charge of women and the family from 1989 to 1993. During her tenure, she implemented decisive reforms for the benefit of women and social progress in Tunisia. She set up structures in charge of the implementation of national policies in several fields mainly:

- The National commission "Women and development;"
- The Unit in charge of monitoring the integration of Women in Development projects;
- The Unit in charge of evaluating the impact of economic projects on the conditions of women;
- The Centre for Research, Studies, Documentation and Information on Women (CREDIF);
- Women and Family High Council;
- The Commission for the Equality of Opportunities and Law Enforcement;

She contributed to the adoption of new legal measures for the benefit of women such as the consolidation of the prerogatives of guardianship to mothers, the Law pertaining to nationality that allows Tunisian mothers who are married to non-Tunisian husbands to grant their Tunisian nationality to their children, and the law pertaining to sexual harassment. She also started funds that guarantee the payment of alimony (maintenance allowance) to divorced women and multiple specific programs for the benefit of women :

- A national strategy aiming at the promotion of rural women;
- A program aiming at the prevention of poverty, exclusion and illiteracy;
- A Prevention program aiming at the integration of the youth in difficulty and single mothers;
- A one hundred point action plan that puts forward a global vision and measures for the promotion of women.

In 1994, she contributed to the founding of the Population and Development South-South Partnership bringing together 24 Asian, African and Latin American countries. She was the first president of the partnership and at present she is its honorary President and an active member of its executive committee. She is in charge of several projects for the benefit of women in Africa and in the whole Arab region.

Thanks to her efforts, Tunis hosts the headquarters of the Centre of Arab Women for Training and Research. She is the first president and founding member of the South-South partnership, an alliance that is founded during the International Conference on Population and Development held in Cairo in 1994. She is currently the honorary president of the partnership and an active member of its executive committee.

=== Family and Population National Board ===
In 1994, she was appointed as head of the Family and Population National Board, a governmental institution that employs a staff of 1600 people and in charge of family and population policies countrywide through 24 regional centres. She completed the conversion of the Board from a successful educational and intervention institution in family planning to a real agency of program execution and implementation in the following fields :

- Reproductive health;
- Mother's health;
- Sexual and reproductive youth health;
- The prevention of Women's cancers;
- The prevention of HIV and AIDS;
- The prevention of violence against women.

She has created and developed structures within the Family and Population National Board and endowed these structures with substantial human and technical means. Among these structures, we may mention :

- Study, Research and Training International Centre;
- Information and Documentation Centre;
- Audiovisual Production and Printed Educational Aid;
- Sexual and Reproductive Service Centre serving both male and female youth;
- Permanent and mobile services in the field of mother and child health and sexual reproduction;
- Pilot centres serving women who are victims of violence.

In view of the experience acquired, the Family and Population National board is required to play, with the support of international sponsors, the role of an agency to implement programs and technical assistance in the field of gender, women's health and reproductive health in third countries such as Niger, Chad, Mauritania, Djibouti, Mali, Yemen and Iraq. She has conducted several research projects and regional studies in Africa and in the Arab region regarding women's rights, human development, socio-economic transformations, health and gender in partnership with diverse :

- European research institutions such as INED, INSERM:
- American research institutions such as Genuity, Population council, USAID, Population action international:
- Arab League institutions such as the Arab League and Cairo Demographic Centre;
- African research institutions such as UEAP, CEFA and IFORD.

=== NGOs ===
She has always been actively involved in several associations and she is known for her unfailing support for NGOs. She has encouraged and supported the creation of NGO by women and for women. As Member of the Board of Directors of ENDA, inter-Arab, an international NGO working in the field of micro-credits, she has striven for and succeeded in the economic integration of 100,000 women in Tunisia. For other members of the Board of Directors, Nébiha Gueddana represents the "Social Conscience" of the NGO. She has succeeded to guarantee the inclusion of NGOs as inescapable partners in South-South cooperation.

=== International level ===
Nébiha Gueddana enjoys a strong capacity of advocacy and fund mobilization with decision makers. She puts all the required rigor for the sake of an optimal use of resources guaranteeing high performance indicators. She actively cooperates with UN organizations, and she brings forth her expertise to the implementation of the objectives of the Beijing Conference, those of the Cairo Conference in addition to objectives of the Millennium Development and the recommendations and objectives of the convention for the elimination of all forms of discrimination against women (CEDAW).

Moreover, she has supported large scale initiatives such as the TICAD and NEPAD and has contributed to the reinforcement of the institutional capacities and human resources in Africa. She has been engaged for the reduction of the death rate among mothers in Africa and she has launched several projects to achieve this objective. During the meeting of Regional Committee in charge of the fellow up of the Vision 2011, held in Bamako, she called for the translation of the recommendations aiming at the reduction of the death rate among mothers into practical measures and policies.

At the level of the Maghreb, she has launched many initiatives including the Declaration of Tunis that calls on Maghrebi countries to be mobilized to set up a Maghrebi observatory to put an end to violence against women.

Nébiha Gueddana has been granted national and international awards :

- The prize of the President of the Republic of Tunisia in the field of reproductive health
- The prize of the South-South partnership Alliance granted by the Japanese International Cooperation Agency (JICA) (2008)
- The prize of the UN Program for Development for the efforts of the Board in the field of South-South cooperation (2008)
- She was ranked by "Earth Times" among the 100 men and women who have influenced the main development plans worldwide.
- She is chevalier/ knight of the Republic of Tunisia and chevalier of the Legion of Honor of the French Republic.

The international community has bestowed on the institutions that she heads and runs :

- The title of a Collaborating Centre" of WHO in the field of population; gender and reproductive health was awarded in 2009 to the Research and Training International Centre of the Family and Population National Board.
- During her tenure as President, the South-South Partnership was assigned the status of a permanent observer in the General Assembly of the United Nations
- South-South Cooperation is an integral part of the agenda of the General Assembly of the UNFPA.
- ONGs are involved as inseparable partners in south-south cooperation.
- The project in the field of mother and child health launched by Nébiha Gueddana in Kollo, Niger is cited by the World Bank as "a path to follow" for other countries.

=== Publications ===
Nebiha Gueddana is the author and co-author of many books and scientific articles on the theme of women's health, women's rights and human development. We may mention some of these publications :

- L'adolescent tunisien. Santé et environnement, Social and Preventive Pediatrics Unit of the children Hospital in Tunis, 1987 (the book won a prize awarded by Children International Centre in Paris).
- Un enfant et deux Tunisie, Ministry of Public Health, 1989. (the book won a prize awarded by the Maghrebi Association of medicine)
- « La condition de la femme tunisienne en terre d'Islam et en Tunisie », in Où va la population mondiale. Paris : Le Quotidien du Médecin (1994) : pp. 144.151.
- « Maîtrise de la fécondité et émancipation vont changer les structures familiales », 9th ed. of the North-South Media. Paris : Institut universitaires d'études du développement, 1994, pp. 81–87.
- Population policies and programmes: determinants and consequences in eight developing countries, London : Centre for Population Studies, Health Policy Unit, London School, 1996.
- « Coopération Sud-Sud et Francophonie », In population et Francophonie. (Francophone Parliamentary sessions on population policies and international aid-, General Assembly, ) Paris: John Libbey Eurotext, 1997, pp. 274–282.
- « Étude de la prévalence des MST chez les femmes tunisiennes enceintes et validation de l'algorithme clinique proposé par l'OMS pour la prise en charge des MST », in Contraception, Fertilité, Sexualité. Elsevier SAS, 1999, pp. 85–90.
- « L'expérience du programme tunisien de planification familiale (1956-1966) », in Population et développement en Tunisie, la métamorphose. Tunis : Cérès Editions, 2001, pp. 203–232.
- La promotion des ressources humaines féminines en Tunisie, fondement du développement durable, Tunis, ONFP, 2002.
- « The medical abortion. Experiences of married and unmarried women in Tunis », in Contraception, Tunis, 2004, pp. 6963–9.
- La stratégie de lutte contre la pauvreté en Tunisie, Tunis, ONFP, 2006.
- « Le cancer du sein en Tunisie », La Tunisie Médicale. 87.7 (2009): pp 415–490.

Nébiha Gueddana has supervised research and epidemiologic studies in the field of women's and youth health. She has conducted several socio-demographic studies :

- National study on violence against women in Tunisia, 2009-2010.
- Critical and analytical study of the literature review on violence against women, 2008.
- National inquiry/ survey on mother and child health, MICS3, 2006.
- PAPFAM inquiry/survey- in depth analysis of the results on the transformations within Tunisian families at the social and health levels, 2004 -2205.
- Intensity of regional population ageing, 2004.
- Socio-demographic profile of single women benefiting from termination of pregnancy (abortion), 2003.
- Perception and living with the menopause in Tunisia, 2003.
- Inquiry on "Knowledge, Attitudes and Practices" in the field of the breast cancer screening, 2003.
- Impact of the national family planning program on social sectors, 2002-2003.
- Study of organized mass screening of breast cancer through mammography, 2000-2002.
- Inquiry/survey on osteoporosis among women aged over 45, 2002.
- PAPFAM inquiry/ survey on family health. Other researched issues: modernity, youth, STD, HIV...2001-20002.
- PAPCHILD inquiry/ survey on mother and child health (how common and frequent is the use of contraception, vaccination...), 1994.
- Multi-centric study on contraception techniques and fertility, WHO, 1980-1990.

== See also ==
- Politics of Tunisia
