= Tunisian duro =

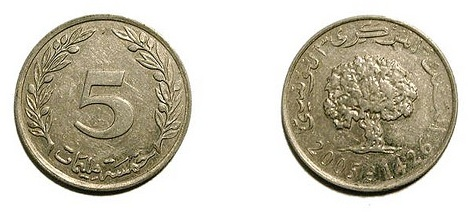
The faces of a five millime or "duro" coin

The Tunisian duro is the nickname of the small silver coin that is part of the Tunisian currency. It has originated from the Spanish word Duro (monetary unit), a nickname for the five peseta coin.

The value of the coin is five millimes or 0.005 of a Tunisian dinar, and is the smallest denomination currently being minted (smaller 1 and 2 millime coins are no longer issued).
