= Institut National de la Statistique du Niger =

Niger's principal government institution in charge of statistics and census data

The Institut National de la Statistique du Niger (INS-Niger) is a national institute of Niger, which is dedicated to collecting data in the country. It is responsible for compiling data in the country and obtaining census data. It collects data on demographics, population, climatology, transport, industry, electricity, education and employment etc.
