= MC Dricka =

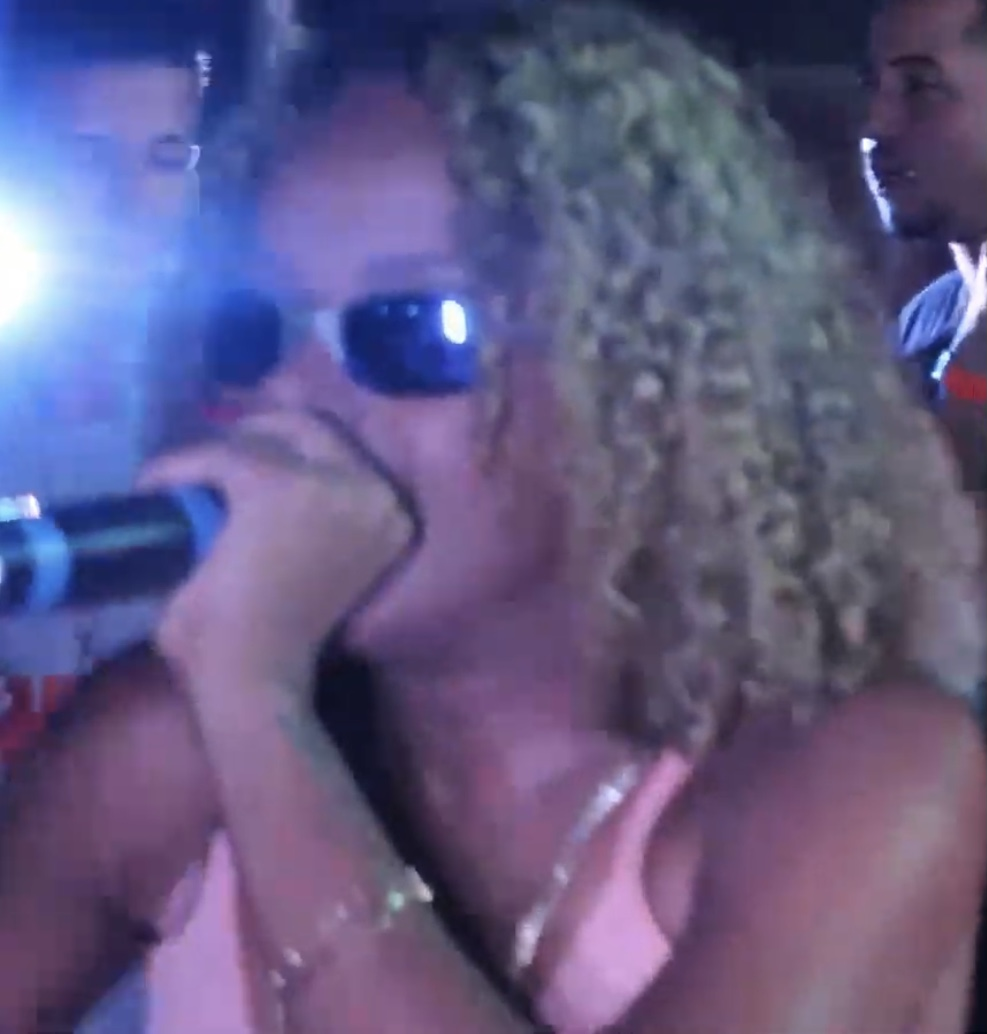
- Dricka performing in May 2020

Background information
- Born: Fernanda Andrielli Nascimento Dos Santos; 7 October 1998 (age 27)
- Origin: São Paulo, Brazil
- Genres: Funk carioca; funk melody; funk ostentação; trap
- Occupations: Singer, songwriter
- Years active: 2015–present
- Label: GR6

Fernanda Andrielli Nascimento Dos Santos (born October 7, 1998 in São Paulo), known professionally as MC Dricka, is a Brazilian singer and songwriter whose music consists mostly of the dirty funk genre.

She earned the nickname "Rainha dos Fluxos" (Queen of Flows) for her success at favelas parties in São Paulo. Dricka is known for her aggressive music and direct lyrics, written with the purpose of elevating women's self-esteem. She is also recognized for being one of the first break-out woman artists in a male-dominated space. She is known as one of the empowering voices and advocates of funk music, famous for popularizing the rhythm of São Paulo's favelas throughout Brazil and the world.

== Career ==
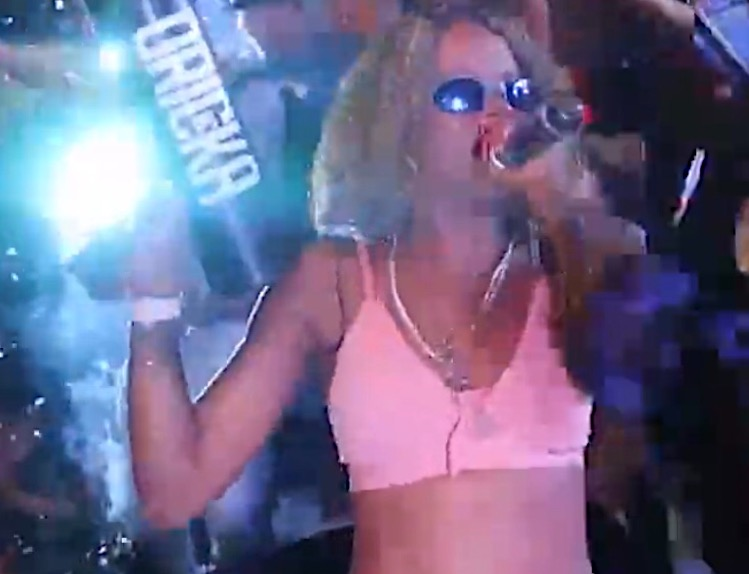
MC Dricka in 2020

On June 11, 2019, she released the single “Empurra Empurra" with DJ Will DF. The song was an overnight success, accumulating about 20,000 views on YouTube in a single day, and was responsible for launching her fame throughout Brazil. Since then, Dricka has continuous to release singles that are successful in the funk balls of the favelas of São Paulo. Her biggest hit has been "Empurra Empurra" and she has currently accumulated over 60 million streams and 200 million views on YouTube as of June 2022. MC Dricka was nominated for Best New International Act at the 2021 BET Awards. It was the singer's first nomination for the award.

== Personal life ==
Dricka was born and raised in the north zone of São Paulo and also spent part of her childhood in Sergipe. She is openly LGBT and is married to model Larissa Novais. Since she was a teenager, she has been engaged in social movements, and she is known for her feminist lyrics, and for promoting social, racial and gender equality. She has been also a public supporter of Lula for president in the 2022 Brazilian general elections.

== Discography ==
=== Extended plays ===
Title	Details
Rainha dos Fluxos	Released: 20 December 2020; Label: Ritmo dos Fluxos; Formats: Digital download, streaming
Acompanha	Released: 7 May 2021; Label: Independent; Formats: Digital download, streaming

=== Singles ===
==== As lead artist ====
- "Empurra Empurra" (Push, Push)
- "38 Carregado"
- "Vai Fazer Carão"
- "Bate Bate"
- "Pretinha do Peitin e do Bundão"
- "Me Olha e Me Respeita"
- "E Nós Tem Um Charme Que É Da Hora"

==== As featured artist ====
- "Pancada" (with Mateus Carrilho)
- "Thistle" (with Skrillex)
- "Pente Rala" (with Skrillex)

== Awards and nominations ==
Organization	Year	Category	Nominated work	Result	Ref.
BET Awards	2021	Best New International Act	Herself	Nominated	
