= Tunisian dinar =

Currency of Tunisia

دينار تونسي (Arabic)
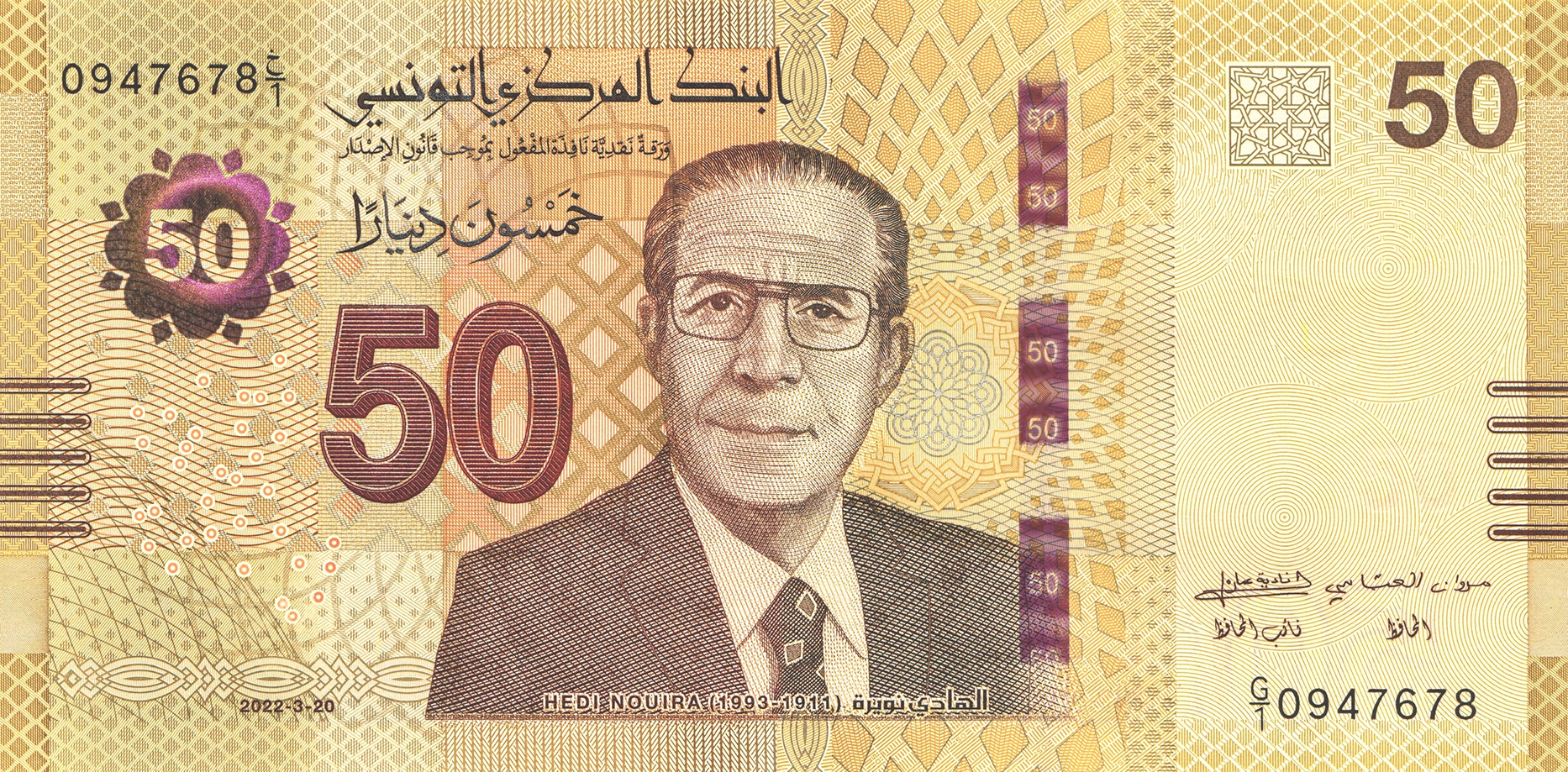
- 50 Tunisian dinars (2022)

ISO 4217
- Code: TND (numeric: 788)
- Subunit: 0.001

Units of account
- Symbol: د.ت (Tunisian Arabic) or DT (Latin)
- Subunit
- 1/1000: milim or millime

Denominations
- Banknotes
- Freq. used: 5, 10, 20, 50 dinars
- Coins
- Freq. used: 50, 100, 200 millimes 1/2, 1, 2, 5 dinars
- Rarely used: 5, 10, 20 millimes

Demographics
- User(s): Tunisia

Issuance
- Central bank: Central Bank of Tunisia
- Website: www.bct.gov.tn

Valuation
- Inflation: 4.9% (Nov. 2020)
- Source: "L'Institut National de la Statistique. Inflation (glissement Annuel)". www.ins.tn (in French).

The dinar (Arabic: دينار, ISO 4217 code: TND) is the national currency of Tunisia. It is subdivided into 1000 milim or millimes (ملّيم), colloquially called "Franc". The abbreviation DT is often used in Tunisia, although writing "dinar" after the amount is also acceptable (TND is less colloquial, and tends to be used more in financial circles); the abbreviation TD is also mentioned in a few places, but is less frequently used, given the common use of the French language in Tunisia, and the French derivation of DT (i.e., dinar tunisien). It can also stand for "Dinaar Tounsi".

== Etymology ==
The name "dinar" is derived from the Roman denarius, used in the Africa province, the ancient territory of Carthage, Tunisia.

== History ==
The dinar was introduced in 1960, having been established as a unit of account in 1958. It replaced the franc at a rate of 1,000 F = 1 dinar. The dinar did not follow the devaluation of the French franc in 1958, thus the exchange rate peg was abandoned. Instead a peg to the United States dollar of 1 dinar = US$2.38 was established which was maintained until 1964, when the dinar devalued to 1 dinar = $1.90. This second rate was held until the dollar was devalued in 1971.

Tunisia had a historically low inflation. The dinar was less volatile in 2000–2010 than the currencies of its oil-importing neighbors, Egypt and Morocco. Inflation was 4.9% in fiscal year 2007–08 and 3.5% in fiscal year 2008–09. However, the value of the currency has been falling since then, and between 2008 and 2018, the dinar depreciated by about 55% against the U.S. dollar, from $0.76 to $0.34, and about 46% against the euro, from €0.55 to €0.30.

== Coins ==
In 1960, aluminium 1, 2 and 5 millime and brass 10, 20, 50 and 100 millime coins were introduced. The 1 and 2 millimes were last issued in 1990 and 1983 respectively, and are no longer legal tender. In 1968, nickel 1/2 dinar coins were introduced, replaced by smaller, cupro-nickel pieces in 1976, when cupro-nickel 1 dinar coins were also introduced. Bimetallic 5 dinar coins were introduced in 2002.

Coins in circulation are (link included current and historic coins and banknotes)

- 5 millimes
- 10 millimes
- 20 millimes
- 50 millimes
- 100 millimes
- 200 millimes
- 1/2 dinar
- 1 dinar
- 2 dinars
- 5 dinars

On 26 December 2013, two new tridecagonal coins were introduced: 200 millimes (copper-zinc, 29 mm diameter, 1.80 mm thickness, 9.4 gr. weight) and 2 dinar (copper-nickel, 29.4 mm diameter, 1.90 mm thickness, 11.2 gr. weight).

Coins in circulation
Image	Value
	5 millimes
	10 millimes
	20 millimes
	50 millimes
	100 millimes
	200 millimes
	1/2 dinar (500 millimes)
	1 dinar (1000 millimes)
	2 dinars (2000 millimes)
	5 dinars (5000 millimes)

== Banknotes ==
On 3 November 1958, banknotes were introduced by the Central Bank of Tunisia in denominations of 1/2, 1 and 5 dinars. The designs of these denominations were changed with a series of notes dated 1-6-1965, but issued on 3 March 1966. A 10-dinar note dated 1-6-1969 was issued on 2 January 1970. The last 1/2-dinar notes were dated 1973-10-15 whilst the last 1-dinar notes were dated 1980-10-15. 20-dinar notes dated 1980-10-15 were introduced on 26 December 1984. 30-dinar notes were issued between 1997 and 2011. 50-dinar notes dated 2008 were issued on 25 July 2009. On 8 November 2005, an updated version of the frequently used 10-dinar note was issued.

After the fall of the Ben Ali regime in Tunisia on 14 January 2011, a new set of banknotes was issued progressively to replace the banknotes bearing motifs of the Ben Ali regime; on 31 December 2019, those notes issued prior to 2011 were completely demonetized. Previous issues had ceased to be used for several years beforehand but were still exchangeable at the Central Bank until that date.

A second redesigned series was issued from 2017, beginning with a redesigned 20-dinar note issued in 2017 and a redesigned 10-dinar note in 2020. As of 2020, the 20 and 50 dinar notes issued 2011 and the 5 and 10 dinar notes issued 2013 were in use as well as the new series. At that time, 50 dinar notes were withdrawn from circulation when sent to the Central Bank in the course of their circulation while a new design hadn't been confirmed yet. In 2022, new banknotes of 5 and 50 dinars were introduced.

Demonetized banknotes (1992–2008 Series)
Image		Value	Main color	Description	
Obverse	Reverse	Value	Main color	Obverse	Reverse
		5 dinars	Green	Hannibal, Port Punique (Carthage)	Motif commemorating the overthrow of Habib Bourguiba on 7 November 1987
		10 dinars	Blue	Ibn Khaldoun	Motif commemorating the overthrow of Habib Bourguiba on 7 November 1987
		10 dinars	Blue	Elissa (Dido) Instituted after the United Nations IT conference in Tunis 2006.	Sbeitla temple, satellite dish
		20 dinars	Purple	Kheireddine Et-Tounsi	Motif commemorating the overthrow of Habib Bourguiba on 7 November 1987
		30 dinars	Green, orange	Aboul-Qacem Echebbi	Tunisian farm with goats and ”TRENTE DINARS” written above
		50 dinars	Green and purple	Ibn Rachik, the City of Culture building	Rades bridge over ship canal to Tunis, Enfidha-Hammamet International Airport (formerly Zine el-Abidine ben Ali Airport; renamed after President el-Abidine left the country in 2011)

2011–2013 Series
Image		Value	Main color	Description	
Obverse	Reverse	Value	Main color	Obverse	Reverse
		5 dinars	Lime Green	City of Carthage; Carthaginian general, Hannibal wearing a helmet	Carthaginian ships
		10 dinars	Blue and Yellow	Aboul-Qacem Echebbi	Arches of Medesa Bacchia school in Tunis
		20 dinars	Red, blue, and yellow	Kheireddine Et-Tounsi, Ksar Ouled Soltane fortified granary in Tataouine district	L’École Sadiki (Sadiki College) building in Tunis
		50 dinars	Green, blue, and orange	Ibn Rachik, Musée de la Monnaie (Currency Museum) building in Tunis	Place Gouvernement la Kasbah, central square in Tunis

Current banknotes (2017–2022 series)
Image		Value	Size	Main Color	Description		Year of Introduction
Obverse	Reverse	Value	Size	Main Color	Obverse	Reverse	Year of Introduction
		5 dinars	143 × 70 mm	Green	Slaheddine el Amami	Roman aqueducts in Zaghouan	2022
		10 dinars	148 × 73 mm	Blue	Tewhida Ben Sheikh	Berber pottery and jewelry	2020
		20 dinars	153 × 76 mm	Red	Farhat Hached	Amphitheater of El Djem	2017
		50 dinars	158 × 79 mm	Brown	Hedi Nouira	Building of the Central Bank of Tunisia	2022

== Popular nomenclature ==
Tunisians sometimes informally do not use the main unit (dinar) when mentioning the prices of goods, instead they use the sub-unit (milim). Accordingly, one dinar and a half is often referred to as khomstach en miya (literally fifteen hundred). This applies to all prices below 2 dinars. 50 dinar is often referred to as khamsin alf (fifty thousand). This convention is used even for higher prices, for example 70,000 dinars would be called sab'in maliun (seventy million). "Francs" is also still heard from time to time, 1,000 of them colloquially representing a single dinar. In addition to that, Tunisians tend to use the word "frank" instead of millime. For example, 100 millimes (0.1 dinars) is referred to as "miyat frank" (literally 100 franks). The word Frank originated from the French colonial era.

== Currency restrictions ==
It is a criminal offense in Tunisia to import or export dinars, as it is a closed currency. Every year, each citizen can convert into foreign currency up to 6,000 Tunisian dinars before departure from the country. Therefore, prices at duty-free shops are in convertible currencies such as euros, US dollars and British pounds. There are many converting ATMs in the country for tourists.

Current TND exchange rates
From Google Finance:	AUD CAD CHF CNY EUR GBP HKD JPY USD
From Yahoo! Finance:	AUD CAD CHF CNY EUR GBP HKD JPY USD
From XE.com:	AUD CAD CHF CNY EUR GBP HKD JPY USD
From OANDA:	AUD CAD CHF CNY EUR GBP HKD JPY USD

== See also ==
- Economy of Tunisia
- Carthaginian coinage
- Denarius
- Tunisian rial or piastre
- Tunisian franc
- Algerian dinar
- Libyan dinar
