= Tewhida Ben Sheikh =

Tunisian physician (1909–2010)

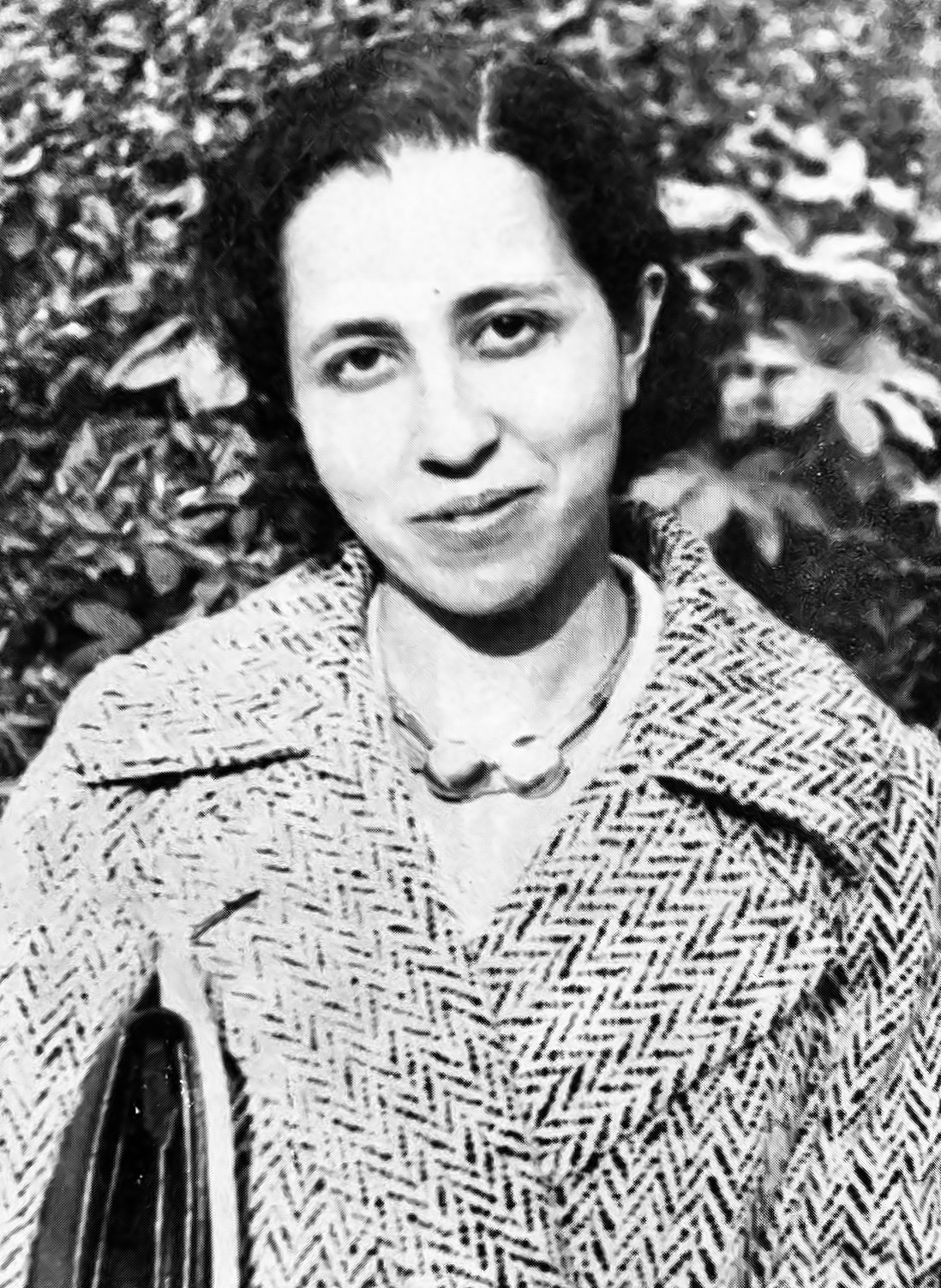
- Tewhida in 1936
- Born: January 2, 1909; Ras Jebel, French Tunisia
- Died: December 6, 2010 (aged 101)
- Education: School of Medicine in Paris
- Medical career
- Profession: contraception and abortion

Tewhida Ben Sheikh (Arabic: توحيدة بن الشيخ; also Tawhida Ben Cheikh, Taouhida Ben Cheikh) (January 2, 1909 in Ras Jebel – December 6, 2010) was the first modern Tunisian and North African woman to become a physician. She was also a pioneer in women's medicine, in particular contraception and abortion access.

== Early years ==
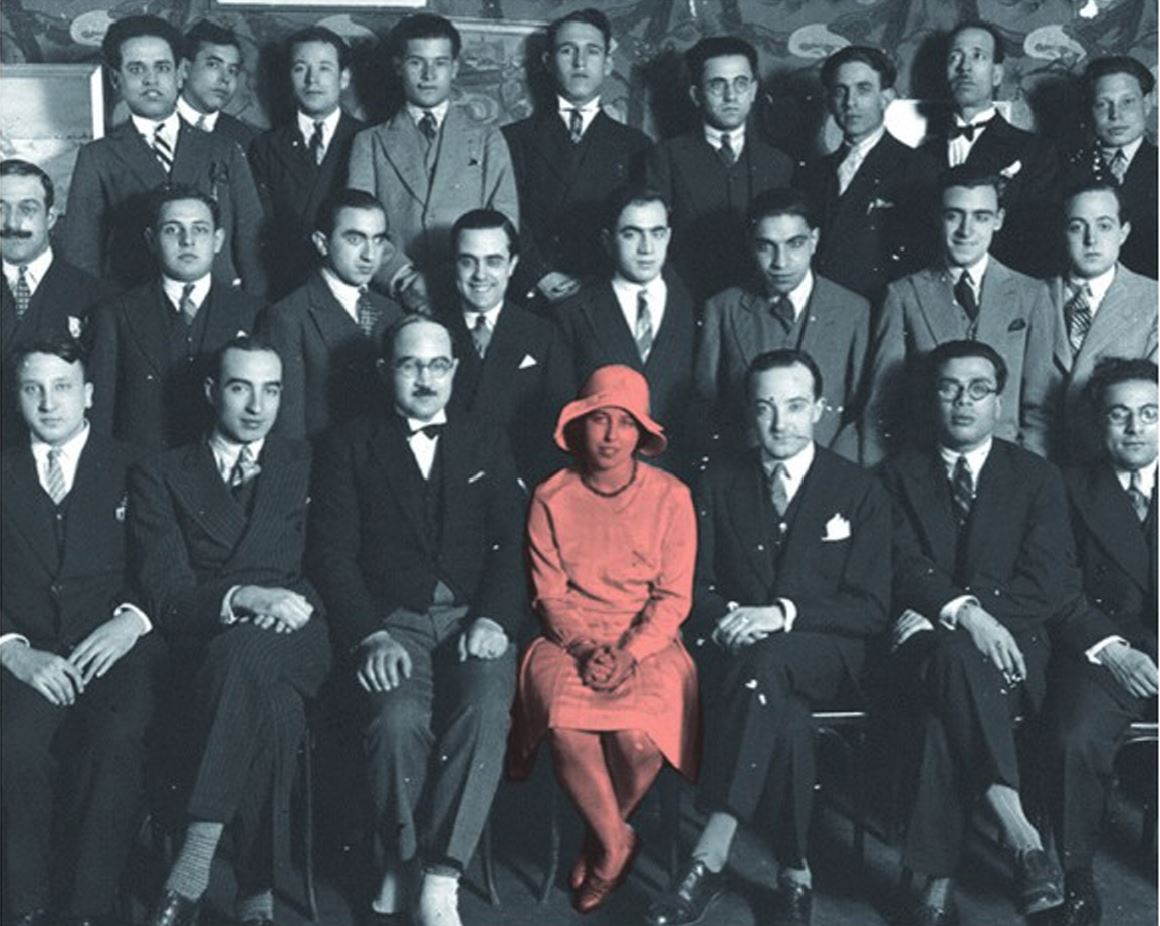
Tunisian members of AEMNA (association of North African Muslim students), in Paris

Tewhida Ben Sheikh was born in Tunis, Tunisia. Her early education was at Tunisia's first public school for Muslim girls, Lycée de la rue de Russie, which was established by Tunisian nationalists and French occupation. While attending this school, Ben Sheikh was taught Arabic, French, the study of the Qur'an, and modern subjects. She travelled to the School of Medicine, Faculté de médecine de Paris to pursue her education, earning a degree in medicine in 1936. Upon her return to Tunis, she was given a dinner in her honour by local doctors.

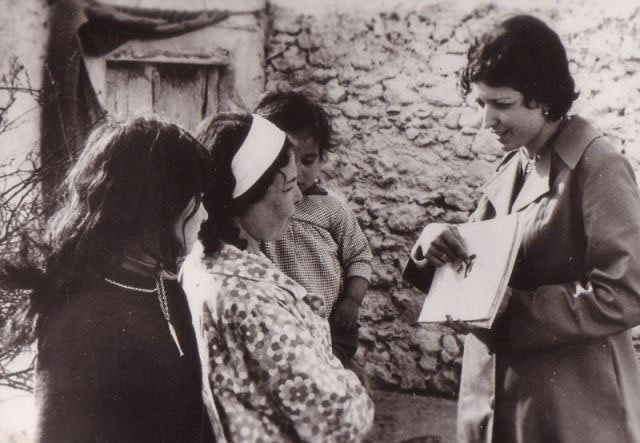
Tewhida Ben Sheikh during her awareness campaigning for family planning in Tunisia.

Tunisia was a French protectorate at the time. Ben Sheikh came from an elite Tunisian family which was socially conservative, and her widowed mother who raised alone her five children was reluctant to allow her to go to France after secondary school; however, her secondary school instructors and a doctor from the Louis Pasteur Institute of Tunis (Dr. Etienne Burnet), persuaded Ben Sheikh's mother that she showed significant promise.

== Civil society engagement ==
She served as the vice-president of the Tunisian Red Crescent.

She was active in the Tunisian independence movement until independence from France in 1953.

She contributed to the creation of several organizations to help orphans, promote children's care and education for the elderly. In 1950, she founded the Society for Social Aid (Jami'iyat al-Is'af al-Ijtima'i) جمعية الاسعاف الاجتماعي, the Orphanage Welcome (Dar al-Aytam), and Women's Welcome (Dar al-Mar'a). She also established the Qammata Society for child care and maternal education, aimed streigntening awareness and training for mothers from poor families to obtain better healthcare.

== Legacy ==
At the initiative of the mayor of Montreuil, Dominique Voynet, a Tawhida-Ben Cheïkh health center was established in March 2011.

A stamp featuring her likeness was issued in 2012 by the Tunisian Post.

In March 2020, Dr. Ben Cheikh featured on the new 10-dinar banknote issued by the Central Bank of Tunisia.

On 27 March 2021, Google celebrated her with a Google Doodle.

On November 25, 2022, the municipality of Ras Jebel, in the Bizerte Governorate, unveiled a bust of Tawhida Ben Cheikh.

== See also ==
- Birth control
- Women in medicine
- Women in Tunisia
