= Duros (food) =

Mexican snack food made of puffed wheat

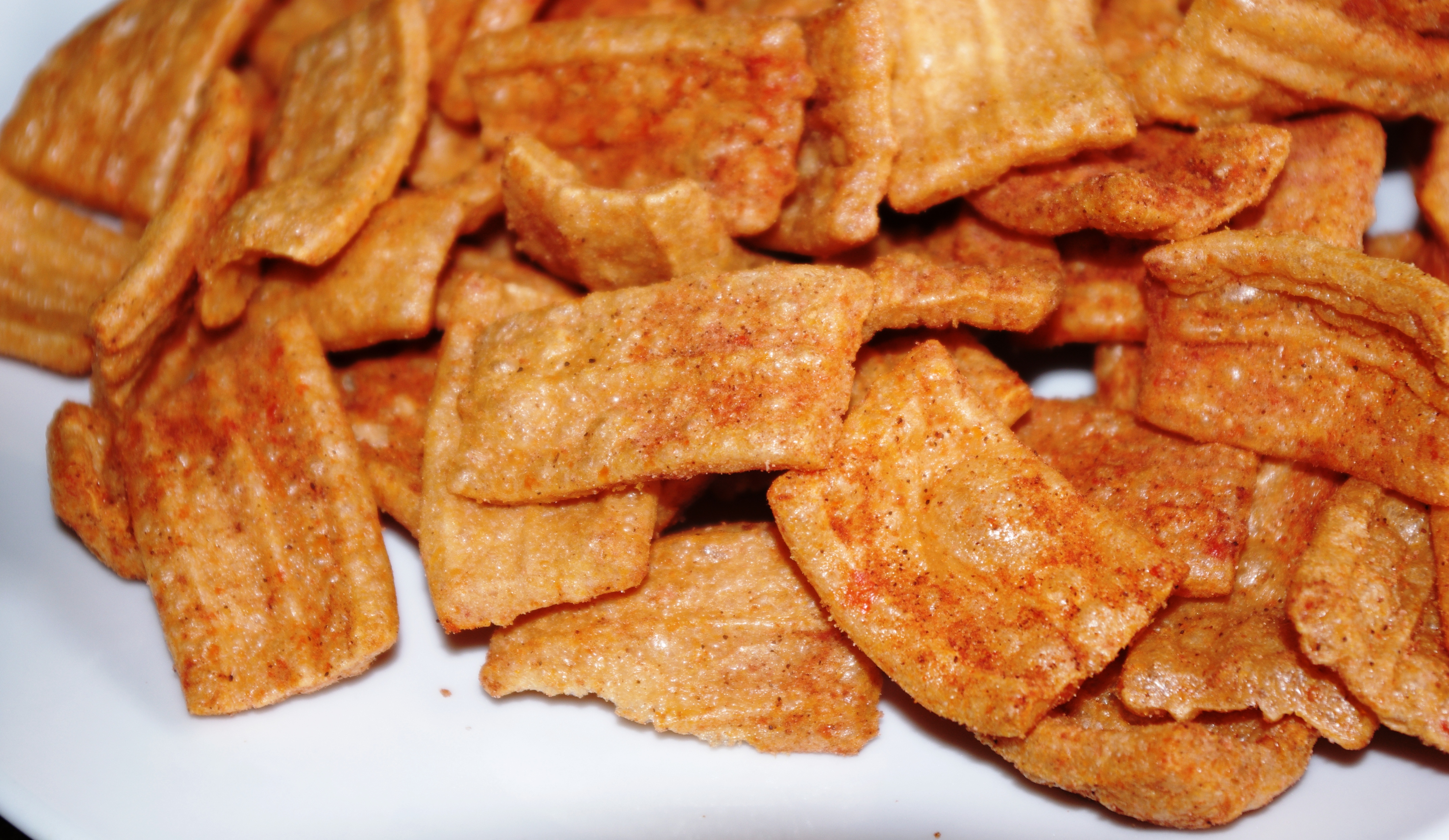
Duros with chili and lime flavoring

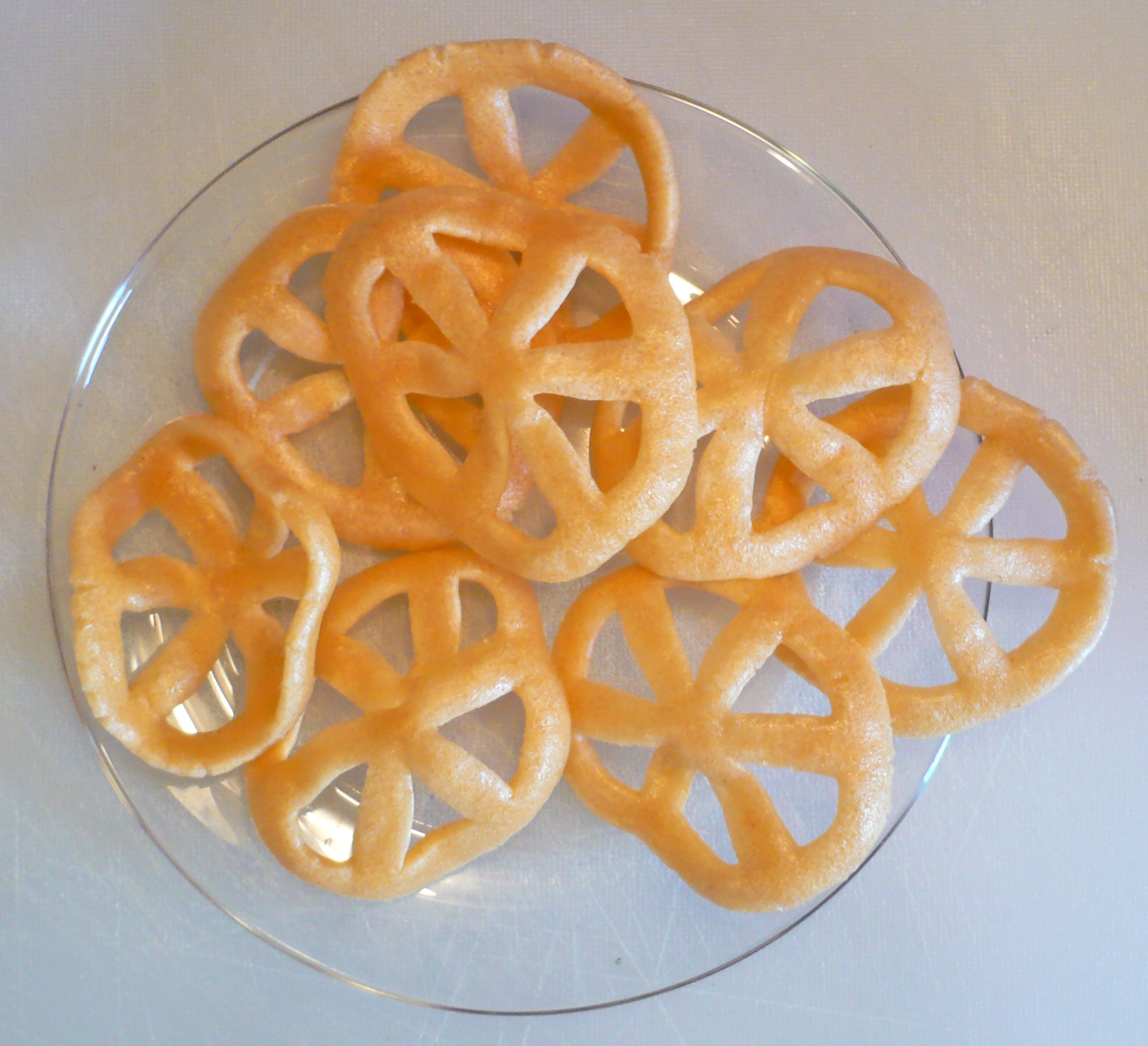
Round flour duros puff up when fried.

Duros de harina (also known as pasta para duros, duritos, durros, pasta para durito, chicharrones, churritos, Mexican wagon wheels or pin wheels) are a popular Mexican snack food made of puffed wheat, often flavored with chili and lime.

When cooked, duros have a light, airy consistency similar to chicharrones. Although both foods contain comparable amounts of fat, chicharrones contain more protein while duros are mainly carbohydrates, as they consist of wheat flour, with added corn starch, salt and baking soda to aid even expansion during cooking.

Duros are sometimes sold by street vendors and can also be purchased in their uncooked pasta-like form at many Mexican grocery stores; they are commonly made in 1-inch-square pieces and round wagon wheel shapes, but they also come in many various sizes of strips and squares.

== Preparation ==
Duros may be microwaved, but the best results are achieved when they are deep fried. Ready-to-make duros are often sold in supermarkets, and simply require being fried in oil. They are typically seen served by street vendors in a plastic bag and topped with salsa and chili, lime, salt, or with hot sauce and lemon juice that is sprayed into the bag, then finished with chili powder.

== See also ==
- Chicharrones
- Prawn cracker
