= Islam and abortion =

Islamic views on abortion

Muslim views on abortion emphasise the sanctity of life, drawing on Qur’anic guidance and the interpretations of religious scholars, abortion being defined as the killing of the foetus and its removal from a pregnant woman’s womb. Verses discouraging the taking of innocent life—such as Qur’an 5:32 and 17:31—are frequently applied to the issue, leading most jurists to consider abortion a form of unjust killing and therefore forbidden. Despite this, the Qur’an’s failure to address human abortion explicitly has led to differing opinions among Islamic scholars.

Each of the four Sunni Islam schools of thought—Hanafi, Shafi'i, Hanbali, and Maliki—have their reservations on if and when abortions are permissible. The Maliki school holds that "the fetus is ensouled at the moment of conception." Thus, "most Malikis do not permit abortion at any point, seeing God's hand as actively forming the fetus at every stage of development." The Sahih al-Bukhari (book of Hadith) writes that the fetus is believed to become with soul after 120 days' gestation. Therefore, some Hanafi scholars believe that abortion before the hundred-twenty-day period is over is permitted, though some Hanafi scholars teach that abortion within 120 days is makruh (disapproved, i.e., discouraged). All Islamic schools of thought agree that the mother's life is paramount, and in the case of a life-threatening pregnancy, separation of the mother and unborn child may be necessary.

In Shia Islam, abortion is "forbidden after implantation of the fertilized ovum." The leader of the Iranian Islamic Revolution, Ayatollah Khomeini, declared that shari'a forbids abortion without any reason "even at the earliest possible stage." a position shared by other Shiite scholars.

In the 47 countries of the world with Muslim-majority populations, access to abortion varies greatly. In many, abortion is allowed when the mother's life is at risk. In 18 countries, including Iraq, Egypt, and Indonesia, this is the only circumstance where abortion is permitted. In another ten countries, it is allowed on request. Mauritania, however, prohibits abortion under any circumstance.

== History ==
Most scholars during the medieval age viewed 120 days after conception as a crucial dividing line in the development of the fetus – the time when the fetus became "ensouled" (becomes imbued with a living soul) and thus a live human being. Abortion before this point was permissible according to Islamic law scholar Abed Awad, but after this period, it was considered a termination of life. These views toward abortion are still referenced and used by several modern Islamic theologians and scholars.

According to religious studies scholar Zahra Ayubi, historically, Muslim thought was more concerned with the topic of preservation of human life and safeguarding of the mother's life than with determining when life begins. Several contemporary Muslim writers have also stated that pre-modern Islamic scholars were more tolerant of abortion.

The Hanbali jurist Ibn Taymiyyah stated in his fatwa collection Fatawa Ibn Taymiyyah, "Aborting a fetus has been declared unlawful (haram) with the consensus of all the Muslim scholars. It is similar to burying an infant alive as referred to by Allah Almighty in the verse of the Qur'an: 'And when the female infant, buried alive, will be asked as to what crime she was killed for' (Surah al-Takwir, verse 8)". A verse in the Quran refers to pregnant women who abort their pregnancies upon the Day of Judgment.

== Hadith and abortion ==
There were no medical abortions in the time of Muhammad, the Prophet of Islam. Still, several Hadith dealt with situations where a pregnant woman lost an unborn child, often by being struck in the belly.

In at least the Hadith mentioned below (all are "sound" Hadith of Sunni Islam), Muhammad would declare the proper diya (monetary compensation in Islamic law for bodily harm or property damage) for the woman's loss. In each case, the compensation was a slave, thus indicating that the value of an unborn child was another human being.

=== Relevant excerpts ===
Allah's Messenger gave a verdict regarding an aborted fetus of a woman from Bani Lihyan that the killer (of the fetus) should give a male or female slave (as a Diya) but the woman who was required to give the slave, died, so Allah's Messenger gave the verdict that her inheritance be given to her children and her husband and the Diya be paid by her 'Asaba.

Hadith—Sahih al-Bukhari Book 87, Hadith 47, Narrated Abu Hurairah

Umar consulted the companions about the case of a woman's abortion (caused by somebody else). Al-Mughira said: The Prophet gave the verdict that a male or female slave should be given (as a Diya). Then Muhammad bin Maslama testified that he had witnessed the Prophet giving such a verdict.

Hadith—Sahih Bukhari Book 87, Hadith 44, Narrated Al-Mughira ibn Shu'ba

Umar consulted the people about the compensation of abortion of woman. Al-Mughirah b. Shu'bah said: I was present with the Messenger of Allah when he gave judgement that a male or female slave should testify you. So he brought Muhammad b. Maslamah to him. Harun added: He then testified him.

Abu Dawud said: I have been informed that Abu 'Ubaid said: It (abortion) is called imlas [i.e. a man striking the belly of his wife] because the woman causes it to slip before the time of delivery. Similarly, anything which slips from the hand or from some other thing is called malasa (slipped).

Hadith— Sunan Abi Dawud Book 41, Hadith 77, Narrated Al-Mughira ibn Shu'ba

Umar asked about the decision of the Prophet about that (i.e. abortion). Haml b. Malik b. al-Nabhigah got up and said: I was between two women. One of them struck another with a rolling-pin killing both her and what was in her womb. So the Messenger of Allah gave judgement that the bloodwit for the unborn child should be a male or a female slave of the best quality and then she should be killed.

Abu Dawud said: Al-Nadr b. Shumail said: Mistah means a rolling-pin.

Abu Dawud said: Abu 'Ubaid said: Mistah means a pole from the tent-poles.

Hadith— Sunan Abi Dawud Book 41, Hadith 79, Narrated Ibn-Abbas

== Abortion in various schools of thought ==
=== Ensoulment ===
In Sunni Islam, the period when a fetus becomes ensouled can vary within the same madhhab, even if consensus exists.

- 120 days after conception. The Zahiris, Hanafi, Shi'is, Zaydi, and some Shafi schools view the fetus as being ensouled at 120 days.
- 80 days. However, other Shafi schools set the ensoulment stage of a fetus at 80 days.
- 40 days. In the Maliki and Hanbali schools of thought, ensoulment is placed at 40 days.
- Conception. The Ibadi position states that a fetus becomes ensouled right at the time of conception. Although Zahiri scholars such as Ibn Hazm consider the fetus to be nothing before 120 days, they still prohibit it from conception.

=== Other factors ===
Most schools consider abortion permissible if the pregnancy poses physical or psychological harm to the mother. Socio-economic factors or the presence of fetal anomalies are also viewed as justifiable reasons to abort in many schools. However, Islamic jurists in all schools state that abortion is permissible even after the ensoulment stage of a fetus if the mother's life is in danger.

=== Prohibition of Abortion ===
Although most Islamic scholars permit abortions, there have been views going back to the early centuries that it is prohibited entirely. A famous case besides the Malikites prohibiting it are the literalists or Zahirites. Ibn Hazm was the most influential literalist scholar and led to the conclusion that the face-value/literal interpretation with everything included in the Quran and authentic Sunnah proves that abortion is prohibited in all cases, no matter the stage:

ISSUE: What of the woman who intentionally aborts her child?

Ali [i.e. Ibn Hazm] said: We narrated from Abdullah bin Rabi’, from Abdullah bin Muhammad bin Othman, from Ahmed bin Khaled, from Ali bin Abdul Aziz, from Al-Hajjaj bin Al-Minhal, from Hammad bin Salamah, on the authority of Al-Hajjaj, on the authority of Abda Al-Dhabi: What is the case if a woman was pregnant and intentionally went in her womb and aborted her child?

So Ibrahim Al-Nakha’i responded: She is obligated to emancipate a slave for her husband. She is obligated to give Ghurrah [i.e. blood money for a dead fetus]: a male or female slave.

We narrated from Muhammad bin Saeed bin Nabat, from Abd al-Aziz bin Nasr, from Qasim bin Asbagh, from Ibn Waddah, from Musa bin Muawiyah, from Waki`, from Sufyan al-Thawri, from Al-Mugheerah bin Maqsim, on the authority of Ibrahim Al-Nakha’i that he said: What is the case if a woman drinks medicine and she has an abortion? On that, he responded: She frees a slave, and gives the father Ghurrah.

Abu Muhammad [i.e. Ibn Hazm] said: This is a very valid statement.

Ali [i.e. Ibn Hazm] said: If the soul weren’t breathed into it, then the Ghurra would be upon her. And if the soul was breathed into it: If she did not intentionally kill him, then the Ghurra is also upon her, and the atonement [i.e. Kaffarah] is upon her. But if she intentionally killed him, then the Qisas is upon her, or ransom from her wealth.

But if she died in all of that before the fetus was born then she gave birth to it: Then the Ghurrah is obligatory in all of that, in the case of the accident upon the guilty perpetrator - whether it was the mother or other than her - likewise, in the case of the intentional act before the breathing of the soul. But if the soul has been breathed into it, then the Qisas is upon the perpetrator if it is someone other than her. But if it is her, there is no penalty, no expiation, and nothing at all. This is because there is no judgment upon the deceased, and his wealth has passed to someone else. And with Allah, the success is sought.

According to Ibn Hazm, his view was supported since the 8th century by Ibrahim Al-Nakha'i. The basis for this prohibition is from the Hadith of the aborted woman from Bani Lihyan. However, Ibn Hazm further states that if the child is more than 120 days old, then it is a living being and human. Thus, whoever kills the child by then is punished with either capital punishment or blood money, with the blood money only being mandatory for them if done by accident.

Although strict literalism in Islamic law has been known to be the most lenient compared to other schools of thought, it is not a school of leniency. Sometimes, such as in the case of abortion, Zahiri scholars have rigorous positions when interpreting the Quran and Sunnah at face value.

In his verdict, Ibn Uthaymeen went into detail that before 120 days, abortion only becomes permissible if the mother's life is in danger or if the fetus has a deformity that will harm it psychologically or harm its family. However, he made it clear that this is permissible only before 120 days of gestation and that it does not become permissible at all to abort it after 120 days, even if the mother's life is in danger.

If the mother were to be sure to die, Ibn Uthaymeen still held it impermissible to abort, as he said that it is prohibited in Islamic law to kill someone [in this case, the baby] to save another person [and in this case, the mother]. He further said that this was the decree of God and that no one should find the problem in this scenario, even if it is inevitable that both the mother and child would die, and no one else would be responsible for their death. However, if someone were to abort the child and it dies, then its death is upon the one who does the abortion.

=== When abortion is permissible ===
In Sunni Islam, there is disagreement on rulings between 40 and 120 days. Most scholars in the present era hold position similar to that of the Hanbali school, permitting abortion until 40 days, and until 120 days when pressing conditions exist.

In Shia Islam, abortion is "forbidden after implantation of the fertilized ovum." As with other Shiite scholars, Ayatollah Khomeini declared that "Termination of pregnancy even at the earliest possible stage under normal circumstances without any reason is not allowed" and that "The shari'a does not permit the abortion of a fetus."

Stage	Time period	Hanafites	Shafites	Hanbalites	Malikites	Literalists/Zahirites	Notes
Nutfa (sperm)	0-40 days after conception	Yes	Yes	Yes	No	No	Among contemporary Sunni scholars, Yasir Qadhi states that abortion may be performed within the first 40 days of pregnancy "for a very legitimate reason", but is prohibited after that period, at which point ensoulment occurs.; The Malikites strictly prohibit any means of birth control.
Alaqa (blood clot)	40-80 days after conception	Yes	Some	Some	No	No	
Mudgha (embryo)	80-120 days after conception	Yes	Some	Some	No	No	
Khalqan Akhar (spirit)	120+ days (Note: "Physicians calculate the age of pregnancy from the last period, which is roughly two weeks prior to conception. Therefore, 134 days into the pregnancy—according to physicians—is the 120-day mark in terms of Islamic rulings.") after conception	No	No	No	No	No	It is unanimously agreed amongst scholars of all schools of thought ensoulment has occurred after 120 days, though some (e.g. Ibn az-Zamlakâni) do not equate ensoulment with embryogenesis. The only exception is when birth would endanger the mother's life.

==== After four months of gestation ====
Sayyid al-Sabiq, author of Fiqh al-Sunnah, has summarized the views of the classical jurists in this regard in the following words:

Abortion is not allowed after four months have passed since conception because at that time it is akin to taking a life, an act that entails penalty in this world and in the Hereafter. As regards the matter of abortion before this period elapses, it is considered allowed if necessary. However, in the absence of a reasonable excuse it is detestable [a legal category meaning discouraged but not forbidden]. The author of ‘Subul-ul-Maram’ writes: "A woman’s treatment for aborting a pregnancy before the spirit has been blown into it is a matter upon which scholars differed on account of difference of opinion on the matter of ‘Azal (i.e. measures to hinder conception). Those who allow ‘Azal consider abortion as allowable and vice versa." The same ruling should be applicable for women deciding on sterilization. Imam Ghazzali opines: "Induced abortion is a sin after conception". He further says: "The sin incurred thus can be of degrees. When the sperm enters the ovaries, mixes with the ovum and acquires potential of life, its removal would be a sin. Aborting it after it grows into a germ or a leech would be a graver sin and the graveness of the sin increases very much if one does so after the stage when the spirit is blown into the fetus and it acquires human form and faculties."

==== Threat to the woman's life ====
On the issue of the life of the woman, Muslims universally agree that her life takes precedence over the life of the fetus. This is because the woman is considered the "source of life," while the fetus is only "potential" life. Muslim jurists agree that abortion is allowed based on the principle that "the greater evil [the woman's death] should be warded off by the lesser evil [abortion]." The physician is considered a better judge than the scholar in these cases.

According to the Twelvers, there is consensus among ayatollahs that abortion is allowed only when it is medically proven that the life of a mother is in danger. Other than that, before or after 120 days, abortion is always forbidden, no matter the circumstances (such as problems with the fetus or poverty, etc.).

==== Rape ====
In the modern day, most Islamic jurists hold a position similar to that of the Hanbali school, permitting 120 days when pressing matters such as rape are present.

Following the mass rapes of Bosnian and Albanian women by Serb soldiers in the 1990s, the Grand Mufti of Palestine, Ekrima Sa'id Sabri, took a different position than mainstream Muslim scholars. He ruled that Muslim women raped by their enemies during the Kosovo War could take abortifacient medicine because otherwise, the children born to those women might one day fight against Muslims.

==== Fetal deformity ====
Some Sunni Muslim scholars argue that abortion is permitted if the newborn might be sick in some way that would make its care exceptionally difficult for the parents (e.g., deformities, mental handicaps). Widely quoted is a resolution of the Saudi-led jurisprudence council of Mekkah Al Mukaramah (the Muslim World League) passing a fatwa in its 12th session in February 1990. This allowed abortion if the fetus was grossly malformed with an untreatable severe condition proved by medical investigations and decided upon by a committee formed by competent, trustworthy physicians, provided that the parents request abortion and the fetus is less than 120 days computed from the moment of conception.

== Abortion in Islamic countries ==
There are 57 members in the Organization of Islamic Conference—an organization of countries with Muslim majorities or pluralities. Most Muslim countries have restrictive abortion laws that permit abortions only when the life of the mother is threatened. Twelve members of the Organization of Islamic Conference allow unrestricted access to abortion. Except for Turkey and Tunisia, they are mainly former Soviet Bloc states. Bahrain, a politically and socially conservative Muslim state, is the 12th among these countries to permit unrestricted access to abortion. Among socially conservative Muslim countries, seven countries allow abortion in the first four months of gestation for fetal deformities—four countries in Sub-saharan Africa (Benin, Burkina Faso, Chad, and Guinea) and three in the Middle East (Kuwait, Qatar, and, now, Iran).

== See also ==
- Ensoulment in Islam
- Islamic feminism
