= Nozuka =

Nozuka may refer to:

== Persons ==
- George Nozuka (born 1986), American-Canadian singer songwriter and recording artist
- Justin Nozuka (born 1988), American-Canadian singer-songwriter
- Philip Nozuka (1987) is an American-Canadian actor/performance artist

== Places ==
- Mount Nozuka, located in the Hidaka Mountains, Hokkaidō, Japan
- Nozuka Pass, mountain pass in the south-end of the Hidaka Mountains, Hokkaidō, Japan.
