= Brown Sugar (Ider song) =

2019 single by Ider

Single by Ider

from the album Emotional Education
- Released: 1 February 2019
- Genre: R&B; alt-pop
- Length: 3:36
- Label: Glassnote
- Songwriter(s): Elizabeth Somerville; Megan Markwick
- Producer(s): Rodaidh McDonald

Ider singles chronology
"Mirror" (2017)	"Brown Sugar" (2019)

Music video
- "Brown Sugar (Live)" on YouTube

"Brown Sugar" is a song recorded by English singer-songwriter duo Ider for their debut album, Emotional Education. It was released on 1 February 2019 as the fourth single from the album.

== Background and composition ==
"Brown Sugar" is a rhythm and blues-inspired track, which Marwick said was influenced by R&B artists such as Kendrick Lamar. Ider used a Roland synthesiser heavily throughout the track. They describe the track as "an empowering song about sex."

== Music video ==
The "live" music video for "Brown Sugar" was released on 31 January 2019. The video features Ider performing the song live, in a dark room with red lighting. The video was directed by frequent Ider collaborator Lewis Knaggs.

== Track listing ==
Digital download

1. "Brown Sugar" – 3:36

== Credits and personnel ==
- Megan Markwick – Vocals, synth, percussion
- Lily Somerville – Vocals, keyboard
- Ben Scott – drums
- Rodaidh McDonald – production
