= Emotional Education =

Studio album by Ider
- Released: 19 July 2019
- Genres: Pop rock; alternative rock
- Length: 40:52
- Label: Glassnote
- Producers: Rodaidh McDonald; MyRiot; Alex Parish

Ider chronology
Gut Me Like an Animal (2017)	Emotional Education (2019)	Shame (2021)

Singles from Emotional Education
- 1. "Body Love" Released: 3 November 2017; 2. "You've Got Your Whole Life Ahead of You Baby" Released: 27 July 2018; 3. "Mirror" Released: 18 October 2018; 4. "Brown Sugar" Released: 1 February 2019; 5. "Saddest Generation" Released: 29 August 2019

Emotional Education is the debut full-length album by English singer-songwriter duo Ider, released on 19 July 2019 through Glassnote Records.

== Background ==
Emotional Education followed Ider's 2017 EP Gut Me Like an Animal, their only release through Aesop. The same year, they signed to Glassnote Records.

The album's title comes from a lyric in its tenth track, "Saddest Generation": "One in four/one in four/where is the emotional education/we're all looking for?"

The material was classified by Metacritic as pop rock, alternative rock and indie, and described by The Independent as an exploration of "mid-20s melancholy".

== Singles ==
The first single from the album, "Body Love", was released on 3 November 2017. HOAX remix of the song was released on 3 October 2018.

The second single, "You've Got Your Whole Life Ahead of You Baby", was released on 27 July 2018. The third single from the album, "Mirror", was released on 18 October 2018. It was followed by the Honors remix on 30 November 2018, and the 12welve remix on 11 January 2019.

The fourth single, "Brown Sugar", was released on 1 February 2019. "Wu Baby" was previewed as a promotional single on 17 May 2019, with a music video released on 21 June.

A new version of "Saddest Generation" from Mahogany Sessions was released as the final single in August 2019, along with a cover of Rihanna's "Kiss It Better".

== Track listing ==
No.	Title	Writer(s)	Producer(s)	Length
1.	"Mirror"	Elizabeth Somerville; Megan Markwick	MyRiot	3:38
2.	"Wu Baby"	Markwick; Somerville; Tim Bran; Roy Kerr	MyRiot	3:39
3.	"Busy Being a Rockstar"	Markwick; Somerville	MyRiot	3:31
4.	"Brown Sugar"	Markwick; Somerville	Rodaidh McDonald	3:36
5.	"Invincible"	Markwick; Somerville	McDonald	3:44
6.	"Clinging to the Weekend"	Markwick; Somerville	McDonald	3:36
7.	"Swim"	Markwick; Somerville	McDonald	3:22
8.	"You've Got Your Whole Life Ahead of You Baby"	Somerville; Markwick	McDonald	3:45
9.	"Body Love"	Somerville; Markwick	Alex Parish	3:41
10.	"Saddest Generation"	Markwick; Somerville	MyRiot	4:09
11.	"Slide"	Markwick; Somerville; Daniel Holloway	Parish; McDonald	4:09
Total length:				40:52

== Critical reception ==
Professional ratings
Aggregate scores
Source	Rating
AnyDecentMusic?	7.1/10
Metacritic	81/100
Review scores
Source	Rating
The 405	8.5/10
Clash	8/10
DIY	4/5 stars
The Guardian	3/5 stars
The Line of Best Fit	10/10
The Observer	4/5 stars

At Metacritic, which assigns a normalised rating out of 100 to reviews from mainstream critics, the album has an average score of 81, based on 6 reviews, indicating "universal acclaim". Pip Williams, writing for The Line of Best Fit, said that the album is "coherent despite a refusal to adhere to genre-based constraints, (...) heartbreaking yet hopeful, relatable yet precise." Kitty Empire for The Observer said that "these 11 songs ping confidently around the post-genre electro-pop landscape."

Narzra Ahmed of Clash described Emotional Education as "a very enjoyable, incomparable album, with moments of extraordinary depth." Writing in The Guardian, Michael Hann wrote that the album "is full of good melodies and millennial anxiety. It just needs the grain of sand that makes the pearl."

== Charts ==
Chart (2019)	Peak position
UK Albums Sales (OCC)	76
UK Vinyl Albums (OCC)	37
UK Independent Albums (OCC)	23
