= Mirror (Ider song) =

2018 single by Ider

Single by Ider

from the album Emotional Education
- Released: 18 October 2018
- Genre: Pop
- Length: 3:38
- Label: Glassnote
- Songwriter(s): Elizabeth Somerville; Megan Markwick
- Producer(s): MyRiot

Ider singles chronology
"You've Got Your Whole Life Ahead of You Baby" (2018)	"Mirror" (2018)	"Brown Sugar" (2019)

Music video
- "Mirror" on YouTube

"Mirror" is a song recorded by English singer-songwriter duo Ider for their debut studio album Emotional Education. It was released on 18 October 2018 as the third single from the album.

== Background and composition ==
"Mirror" was a combination of drafted compositions by both Markwick and Somerville, respectively, and they later collated these into the one song. Lyrically, the song deals with self-worth, depression, anxiety and identity. The middle eight is a rap.

== Music video ==
The music video for "Mirror" was released on 5 November 2018. The video features Markwick and Somerville looking at themselves in the mirror, alongside choreographed dance routine. The video was directed by Lily Rose Thomas and choreographed by Anna Engström.

== Track listing ==
Digital download

1. "Mirror" – 3:38

Honors Remix

1. "Mirror (Honors Remix)" – 4:25

12welve Remix

1. "Mirror (12welve Remix)" – 3:24

== Credits and personnel ==
- Lily Somerville – vocals, keyboard
- Megan Markwick – vocals, synth
- Ben Scott – drums
- MyRiot – production
