= Long Way Down (Robert DeLong song) =

Single by Robert DeLong

from the album In the Cards
- Released: November 10, 2014
- Genre: Indietronica; electropop; glitch pop
- Length: 3:53
- Label: Glassnote
- Songwriters: Evan Bogart; Robert DeLong; Cameron Forbes; Emanuel Kiriakou; Andrew Goldstein
- Producers: Robert DeLong; Emanuel Kiriakou; Andrew Goldstein

Robert DeLong singles chronology
"Global Concepts" (2012)	"Long Way Down" (2014)	"Don't Wait Up" (2015)

"Long Way Down" is a song by American musician Robert DeLong. It was released as the lead single from his second studio album In the Cards (2015). An EP accompanying the release of the single was released on November 10, 2014. The song reached number 3 on the Billboard Alternative Songs chart.

== Release ==
"Long Way Down" was released as an EP on November 10, 2014, featuring three other tracks. The song was also released in the UK as a promotional CD single. A translucent yellow 12" vinyl version of the EP was made available to attendees on his tour and for purchase, as well.

== Track listing ==
- Glassnote – Promotional CD

No.	Title	Length
1.	"Long Way Down" (Clean version)	3:55
2.	"Long Way Down" (Instrumental)	3:54
3.	"Long Way Down" (Breakage's Long Way Round Remix)	3:57

- Glassnote – Digital download and 12" vinyl EP

No.	Title	Length
1.	"Long Way Down"	3:53
2.	"Acid Rain"	4:39

No.	Title	Length
1.	"Feels Like"	3:34
2.	"Isabel Street"	3:44

== Charts ==
=== Weekly charts ===
Chart (2014–2015)	Peak position
Canada Rock (Billboard)	16
US Adult Pop Airplay (Billboard)	38
US Rock & Alternative Airplay (Billboard)	9

=== Year-end charts ===
Chart (2015)	Position
US Rock Airplay (Billboard)	28
