= Holly (album) =

2007 studio album by Justin Nozuka

Studio album by Justin Nozuka
- Released: United Kingdom: March 19, 2007; Canada: April 3, 2007; Netherlands: May 15, 2007; France: February 25, 2008; United States: April 15, 2008; France (re-release): February 9, 2009
- Recorded: 2006–2007
- Genre: Pop; acoustic; soul
- Length: 49:21
- Label: Outcaste; Coalition; Glassnote
- Producer: Bill Bell

Justin Nozuka chronology
| Holly (2007) | You I Wind Land and Sea (2010) |

Holly is the debut album from Canadian singer-songwriter Justin Nozuka. The album was named after his mother Holly. It was first released on March 19, 2007, in the United Kingdom and April 3, 2007, in Canada. It was then released in the United States on April 15, 2008, by Glassnote Records, peaking at numbers six and 30 on the Billboard Top Heatseekers and Independent Albums charts respectively. To promote the album, Nozuka toured across North America with appearances at talk shows.

== Promotion ==
On February 6, 2008, Nozuka announced an 18-city cross-Canada tour with fellow Canadian singer-songwriter Hayley Sales, beginning at Nanaimo, BC's Queen's Hotel and finishing at Toronto's Phoenix Concert Theatre.

On August 14, he announced his first U.S. headlining tour with American rock group the Gabe Dixon Band, beginning at Buffalo's Town Ballroom and finishing at San Francisco's Great American Music Hall. He made his U.S. television debut by appearing on the talk shows Jimmy Kimmel Live! and Good Morning America.

== Critical reception ==
Professional ratings
Review scores
| Source | Rating |
|---|---|
| AllMusic | 4.5/5 stars |
| BBC Music | favourable |

Jo-Ann Greene of AllMusic praised the album for the different facets of love it explores, Nozuka's songwriting and vocal performance, and arrangements in various genres, calling it, "A stunning debut, whose lyrics and atmospheres linger on long after the last (hidden) track has played." Jamie Fisher of BBC Music also echoed Greene's review, praising Nozuka's mature (despite his age) storytelling and singing voice, and choice in vocal notes, concluding "[it's] a superb album, filled with raw quality. Just enjoy."

== Track listings ==
Standard track list

All tracks are written by Justin Nozuka, except where noted.

| No. | Title | Length |
|---|---|---|
| 1. | "Down in a Cold Dirty Well" | 4:27 |
| 2. | "Golden Train" | 3:09 |
| 3. | "Be Back Soon" | 4:21 |
| 4. | "Mr. Therapy Man" | 3:39 |
| 5. | "Supposed to Grow Old" | 4:22 |
| 6. | "After Tonight" (Justin Nozuka, Haydain Neale) | 4:06 |
| 7. | "Criminal" | 4:06 |
| 8. | "I'm in Peace" | 3:41 |
| 9. | "Oh Momma" | 4:54 |
| 10. | "Save Him" | 5:26 |
| 11. | "If I Gave You My Life" (Nozuka, Pete Cugno; includes hidden track "Don't Listen to a Word You've Heard") | 8:10 |

Japanese track list

| No. | Title | Length |
|---|---|---|
| 12. | "Why (demo version)" | 2:58 |
| 13. | "Lullabye" | 4:52 |

DVD

1. "After Tonight" (music video)
2. "I'm in Peace" (acoustic studio video)
3. Interview

== Personnel ==
Adapted from the Holly media notes.

Musicians

- Bill Bell – acoustic guitar, atmosphere guitar, B3 organ ("I'm in Peace"), bass, electric slide ("Mr. Therapy Man"), handclaps, marxophone, percussion, piano, snaps, ukulele ("Mr. Therapy Man")
- Pete Cugno – piano ("If I Gave You My Life")
- Davide Direnzo – drums, percussion
- Damhnait Doyle – vocals ("If I Gave You My Life")
- Kevin Fox – cello ("Golden Train", "Oh Momma")
- George Koller – bass, upright bass ("Mr. Therapy Man", "Supposed to Grow Old", "If I Gave You My Life")
- Justin Nozuka – acoustic guitar, handclaps, snaps, vocals

Production

- Jeff McCullough – recording at Wellesley Sound Studio
- Bill Bell – producing, mixing, additional recording at Soleil Studio
- Phil Demetro – mastering

Artwork

- Filip Matovina – cover art
- Krystina Kavanagh – layout
- Andrew Whitton – photo credit

== Chart performance ==
| Chart (2008–09) | Peak position |
|---|---|
| French Albums (SNEP) | 23 |
| Dutch Albums (Album Top 100) | 79 |
| US Heatseekers Albums (Billboard) | 6 |
| US Independent Albums (Billboard) | 30 |

== Release history ==
| Region | Date | Format | Label | Ref. |
|---|---|---|---|---|
| United Kingdom | March 19, 2007 | CD | Outcaste | |
| Canada | April 3, 2007 | CD | Coalition Entertainment | |
| Canada | July 24, 2007 | Digital download | Coalition Entertainment | |
| United States | April 15, 2008 | CD, Digital download | Glassnote | |
