= Gut Me Like an Animal =

EP by Ider
- Released: 31 March 2017
- Genre: Synth-pop
- Length: 12:20
- Label: Aesop
- Producer: Elizabeth Somerville; Megan Markwick; Shura

Ider chronology
Gut Me Like an Animal (2017)	Emotional Education (2019)

Gut Me Like an Animal is the debut extended play (EP) by English singer-songwriter duo Ider, released on 31 March 2017 through Aesop. This was the band's only release with Aesop.

== Background ==
Having already released material under the moniker Lily and Meg, Gut Me Like an Animal was Markwick and Somerville's first EP release as Ider. Prior to this EP, they had released four standalone singles as Ider throughout 2016. Musically, Gut Me Like an Animal is a synth pop record, and thematically, it has been described as an exploration of love and selfishness.

The EP was preceded by the single "Face On", released on 14 February 2017. "Nevermind" served as a promotional single with a music video at the time of the EP's release.

== Track list ==
No.	Title	Writer(s)	Producer(s)	Length
1.	"Face On"	Elizabeth Somerville; Megan Markwick	Markwick; Somerville	3:42
2.	"Nevermind"	Markwick; Somerville	Markwick; Somerville	3:02
3.	"Does She Even Know"	Markwick; Somerville	Shura	3:57
4.	"GMLAA"	Markwick; Somerville	Markwick; Somerville	1:39
Total length:				12:20
