= Body Love (song) =

2017 single by Ider

Single by Ider

from the album Emotional Education
- Released: 3 November 2017
- Genre: Alt-pop
- Length: 3:41
- Label: Glassnote
- Songwriter(s): Elizabeth Somerville; Megan Markwick
- Producer(s): Alex Parish

Ider singles chronology
"Learn to Let Go" (2017)	"Body Love" (2017)	"You've Got Your Whole Life Ahead of You Baby" (2018)

Music video
- "Body Love" on YouTube

"Body Love" is a song recorded by English singer-songwriter duo Ider for their debut studio album, Emotional Education. It was released on 3 November 2017 as the first single from the album.

== Background and composition ==
"Body Love" was the first song recorded for Emotional Education, in late 2017. Markwick stated that a majority of the track was recorded in her and Somerville's flat in North London. Somerville had decided she wanted to write a song in 7/8, and wrote the piano riff which would later form the basis of the song.

The song deals with themes of self-doubt, self-acceptance, the end of relationships and loneliness.

== Music video ==
The music video for "Body Love" was released on 5 December 2017. Filmed mainly in Markwick and Somerville's flat, the video is a mix of candid videos of Markwick and Somerville, and sections of Markwick and Somerville singing the song. The video was co-directed by Ider and frequent Ider collaborator Lewis Knaggs.

== Live performances ==
Ider performed "Body Love" live for The Line of Best Fit in December 2017.

== Track listing ==
Digital download

1. "Body Love" – 3:41

HOAX Remix

1. "Body Love (HOAX Remix)" – 4:00

== Credits and personnel ==
Note: Credits adapted from Tidal metadata.

- Megan Markwick – vocals, percussion
- Lily Somerville – vocals, keyboard
- Alex Parish – production
