= Memoirs of a Playbwoy =

Memoirs of A Playbwoy

Studio album by JDiggz
- Released: (Canada) August 28, 2007
- Recorded: 2002–2007
- Genre: Canadian hip hop
- Length: 46:46
- Label: Maxamus Records/Koch Entertainment
- Producer: StarBwoyz

Memoirs of a Playbwoy is JDiggz's first album. The album was distributed by Maxamus Entertainment/Koch Entertainment. The long-awaited album by the Canadian Rapper/Producer featured collaborations with popular artists, such as George Nozuka, Cory Lee, Drake, Voyce Alexander and Fyahkid Steenie.

The album produced seven singles, "Hypnotic", "Puush It Up" "Make It Hot", "Gimme Dat", "With You", "Just Wanna Party" and "With You Remix". Music videos for the singles "Puush It Up" "Make It Hot", "Gimme Dat" and "Just Wanna Party" were made and received heavy rotation on MuchMusic . In June 2006, JDiggz was nominated for a MuchMusic Video Awards, MuchVibe Best Rap Video for his club anthem Puush It Up, and again in 2007, Best Cinematography and MuchVibe Best Rap Video for "Make It Hot". The album has also been nominated for a 2008 Juno Award for Best Rap Recording.

In a local interview, JDiggz was first congratulated on "Memoirs Of A Playbwoy" and asked if he thought the next album would be even bigger :

"Well first off, thank you for that! Secondly, I’m very hard on myself, a few days after my label deadline, I was freaking out because I wanted to do more, and make it better. I’m a bit of a perfectionist… and it tends to take a toll on me. "

== Track listing ==
1. "The Way I live" - 3:00
2. "Just Wanna Party" [featuring Voyce Alexander] - 4:38
3. "Gimme Dat" - 2:58
4. "Make It Hot" - 3:34
5. "Bad Gyal" [featuring Fyahkid Steenie] - 3:42
6. "Hypnotic" - 3:43
7. "With You" [featuring George Nozuka]- 3:32
8. "Angel" - 3:29
9. "H8TRZ" - 3:19
10. "Come Home With Me" [featuring Cory Lee] - 3:29
11. "Wutchu Like" - 3:37
12. "Puush It Up" [featuring Fyahkid Steenie] - 3:56
13. "With You Remix" [featuring George Nozuka and Drake]- 3:49
