= You've Got Your Whole Life Ahead of You Baby =

2018 single by Ider

Single by Ider

from the album Emotional Education
- Released: 27 July 2018
- Genre: Dream pop
- Length: 3:45
- Label: Glassnote
- Songwriters: Elizabeth Somerville; Megan Markwick
- Producer: Rodaidh McDonald

Ider singles chronology
"Body Love" (2017)	"You've Got Your Whole Life Ahead of You Baby" (2018)	"Mirror" (2018)

Music video
- "You've Got Your Whole Life Ahead of You Baby" on YouTube

"You've Got Your Whole Life Ahead of You Baby" is a song recorded by English singer-songwriter duo Ider for their debut studio album, Emotional Education. It was released on 27 July 2018 as the second single from the album.

== Background and composition ==
The origins of the song's title comes from a note Markwick wrote in her diary about a year before the song was recorded. Lyrically, the song deals with the anxieties of young adulthood. Speaking about the track, Markwick said: "It was inspired by conversations we’ve had and feelings shared amongst our friends. It’s about the irony of wishing you could act in the moment through hindsight – living life the way you think your future self would want you to."

== Music video ==
The music video for "You've Got Your Whole Life Ahead of You Baby" was released on 13 September 2018. The video features Markwick and Somerville in a garden during the summertime. It was directed by Ider themselves.

== Live performances ==
Ider performed "You've Got Your Whole Life Ahead of You Baby" at Green Man Festival in September 2018.

== Track listing ==
Digital download

1. You've Got Your Whole Life Ahead of You Baby – 3:45

== Credits and personnel ==
- Megan Markwick – lead vocals, synth
- Lily Somerville – backing vocals, keyboard
- Ben Scott – drums
- Rodaidh McDonald – production
