= Ider (band) =

English singer-songwriter duo

IDER
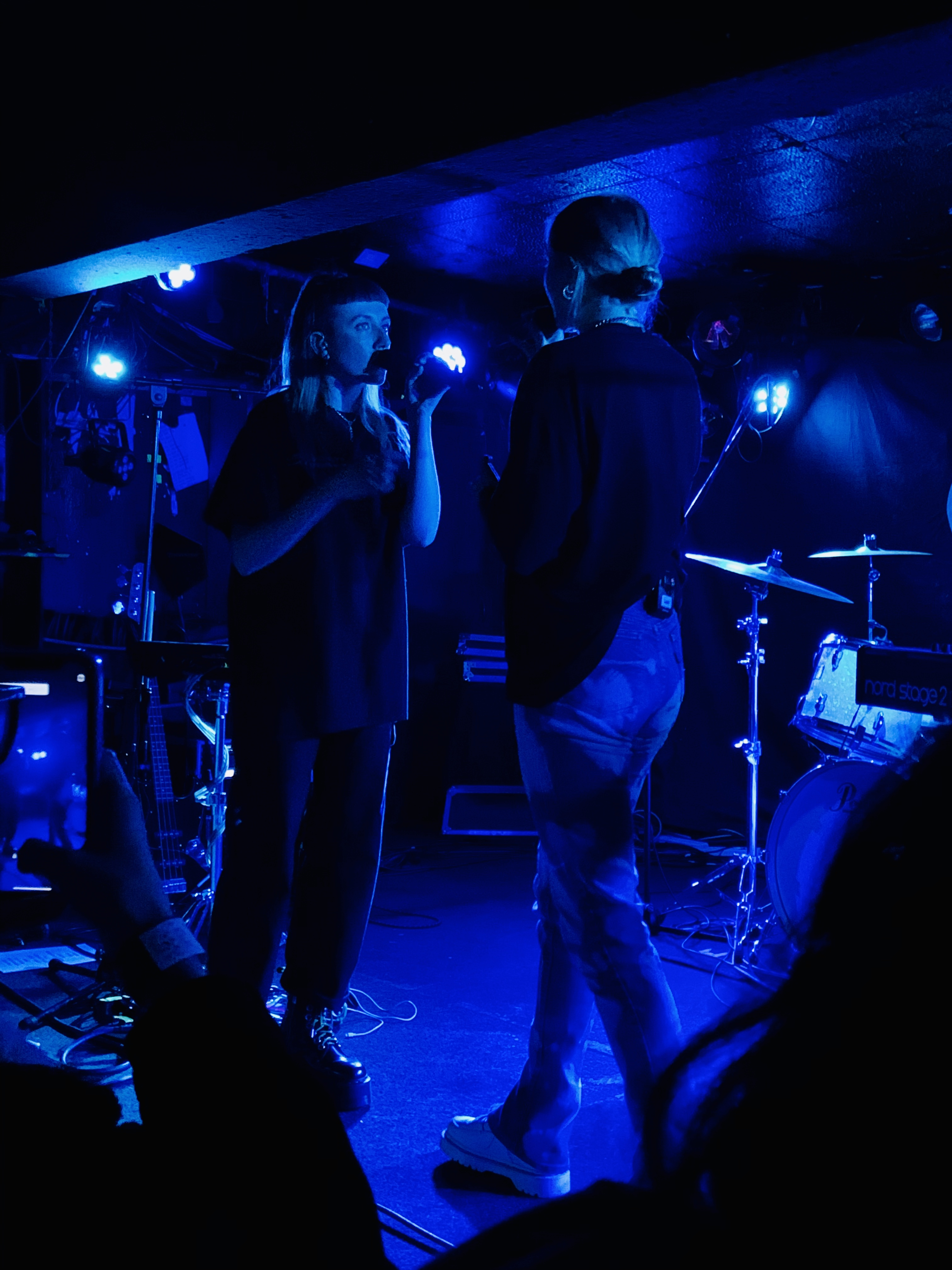
- Markwick (left) and Somerville (right) performing at King Tut's Wah Wah Hut, Glasgow, February 2020

Background information
- Origin: London, United Kingdom
- Genres: Alternative rock; indie rock; dreampop; electropop; synth pop
- Years active: 2016–present
- Labels: Glassnote; Aesop
- Members: Lily Somerville; Megan Markwick
- Website: www.weareider.com

Ider (stylized as IDER) are an English singer-songwriter duo from London, composed of Megan Markwick and Lily Somerville. Their musical style combines features of various musical genres, and it has been described as "cross-genre". Formed in 2016 after performing as Lily & Meg for two years, Ider released their debut EP Gut Me Like an Animal in 2017, followed by the first full-length album Emotional Education in 2019.

Markwick and Somerville have cited Joni Mitchell, Fleetwood Mac, Bruce Springsteen, The Beatles, Nina Simone, Jeff Buckley, Etta James, Gillian Welch, Beyoncé and Dido as influences.

== Career ==
Ider's members, Lily Somerville, who is originally from Tamworth, Staffordshire, and Megan Markwick, who is from North London, met during the first term of their Bachelor of Arts course in Popular Music at Falmouth University in 2012. Throughout university, they formed a friendship and began songwriting and performing together as a folk duo called Lily & Meg. Under this moniker, they toured continuously and released two EPs in 2013 and 2014.

After graduating from Falmouth, they moved to London and renamed the duo Ider, which is an invented name. In April 2016, they self-released their first single under the new name, "Sorry", and supported Tegan and Sara on tour. They put out more singles independently later that year, including "King Ruby" which would be featured in the video game FIFA 18. In 2017, they released the synth-pop EP Gut Me Like an Animal through the Aesop label, which featured a track produced by Shura. Later that year, they were signed to Glassnote Records. Their first release on the new label was "Learn to Let Go" which reached number 23 on the Official Vinyl Singles Chart in the UK. In the same year, the duo played as the opening act for Ibeyi and Oh Wonder.

In 2018, Ider released singles "You've Got Your Whole Life Ahead of You Baby" and "Mirror" which gained considerable popularity. Their debut full-length album Emotional Education was eventually released in July 2019 to positive reviews. It also peaked at number 23 on the UK Independent Albums Chart and 76 on the sales chart. At the end of the year, the duo went on tour in the UK and across Europe, including support dates for Sigrid. At the beginning of 2020, they performed in the US and Canada.

Ider spent several weeks in Berlin at the start of the COVID-19 pandemic, writing new material. Their second album, Shame, was self-released in August 2021. While it did not make an impression on the charts, it received positive reviews from the music critics. In spring 2022, the duo released the EP Shame(less) with stripped-back, acoustic versions of three songs, and went on tour in the UK, Germany and the Netherlands.

In 2024, Ider returned with the singles "Girl", "Unlearn" and "You Don't Know How to Drive" from their forthcoming album Late to the World, which was released in February 2025. In January 2025 they released a further single from the album, "Attachment Theory".

== Members ==
Band members

- Elizabeth 'Lily' Somerville – lead vocals, backing vocals, guitar, keyboard and synth
- Megan 'Meg' Markwick – lead vocals, backing vocals and synth

Studio musicians

- Ben Scott – drums

Live musicians

- Mike Park – drums

== Discography ==
=== Albums ===
- Emotional Education (2019)
- Shame (2021)
- Late to the World (2025)

=== EPs ===
- Songs for Jasper (2013; as Lily and Meg)
- In the Water (Live at the Acorn Theatre) (2014; as Lily and Meg)
- Gut Me Like an Animal (2017)
- Shame(less) (2022)

=== Singles ===
- "Sorry" (2016)
- "Pulse" (2016)
- "King Ruby" (2016)
- "Million" (2016)
- "Face On" (2017)
- "Learn to Let Go" (2017)
- "Body Love" (2017)
- "You've Got Your Whole Life Ahead of You Baby" (2018)
- "Mirror" (2018)
- "Brown Sugar" (2019)
- "Wu Baby" (2019)
- "Saddest Generation" (2019)
- "Saturday," (2020)
- "Cross Yourself" (2021)
- "Bored" (2021)
- "Obsessed" (2021)
- "CBB to B Sad" (2021)
- "Girl" (2024)
- "Unlearn" (2024)
- "You Don't Know How to Drive" (2024)
- "Late to the World" (2024)
- "Know How It Hurts" (2024)
- "Attachment Theory" (2025)
