= You I Wind Land and Sea =

Studio album by Justin Nozuka
- Released: April 13, 2010
- Genre: Pop; acoustic; soul
- Length: 49:40
- Label: Coalition; Glassnote
- Producer: Bill Bell

Justin Nozuka chronology
Holly (2007)	You I Wind Land and Sea (2010)	Ulysees (2014)

You I Wind Land and Sea is the second studio album from American singer-songwriter Justin Nozuka.

== Critical reception ==
Professional ratings
Review scores
Source	Rating
AllMusic	3.5/5 stars
Melodic	3.5/5 stars

AllMusic's David Jeffries stated that Nozuka "holds his own amongst his pop-chart-meets-coffee-house competition by playing up youth's pros (a heart still wide open, not jaded at all) and playing down the cons (no puppy love or irresponsible relationships here)." Jessica Lewis of Exclaim! wrote: "[T]he album is a good effort, but, at times, it feels a little stale or he pushes his voice too close to the Jason Mraz limit, but it's got some touching, soulful moments." Melodic's Pär Winberg commented that the record company tried to make Nozuka sound like Jeff Buckley on the first two tracks but noted that Nozuka is better off taking "a heartfelt sophisticated turn into a soul trip" on the rest of the album, singling out "Soulless Man" and "Heartless" as highlights.

== Track listing ==
All tracks are written by Justin Nozuka; additional music compositions are stated below.

No.	Title	Length
1.	"Gray"	3:30
2.	"Love"	3:54
3.	"Carried You" (Henry Nozuka, Mark Pellizzer)	3:55
4.	"Heartless" (Christian Bridges)	5:23
5.	"My Heart Is Yours"	3:16
6.	"Soulless Man"	4:15
7.	"Unwoken Dream (King with Everything)"	3:39
8.	"Woman Put Your Weapon Down"	5:48
9.	"You I Wind Land and Sea" (Pellizzer)	3:51
10.	"Swan in the Water"	4:17
11.	"Hollow Men"	3:07
12.	"How Low"	4:45

== Personnel ==
Credits adapted from the album's inlay and liner notes.

The Justin Nozuka Band

- Justin Nozuka – guitar, vocals
- Anthony Lavdanski – bass
- Mark Pellizzer – guitar, piano, Rhodes, B3 organ, Wurlitzer
- Alex Tanas – drums

Additional musicians

- Diego Las Heras – percussion
- Bill Bell – marxophone, ambient guitar, slide guitar
- Karen Graves – violin
- Kathryn Sugden – violin
- Eric Paetkau – viola
- Kevin Fox – cello, string arrangement
- Rique Franks – background vocals
- Colina Phillips – background vocals
- Sharon Lee Williams – background vocals
- Gabe Dixon – guest vocals

Production

- Bill Bell – producing
- Vic Florencia – mixing
- Ted Jensen – mastering (Sterling Sound, New York)

Artwork

- Alex Tanas – cover photos
- Dustin Rabin – band studio photo
- Filip Matovina – painting
- Lauren Cohen – performance photo
- Takeover Studio – CD layout
