= In the Light (disambiguation) =

In the Light is a song by Led Zeppelin from their 1975 album Physical Graffiti. The term may also refer to:

- "In the Light", a song originally by Charlie Peacock, covered by DC Talk on their album Jesus Freak
- "In the Light", a song by the Lumineers from the 2016 album Cleopatra
- In the Light (Keith Jarrett album), an album of contemporary classical music
- In the Light (Max Roach album), an album of jazz music

== See also ==
- In Light
