= Robert DeLong =

American electronic musician and producer

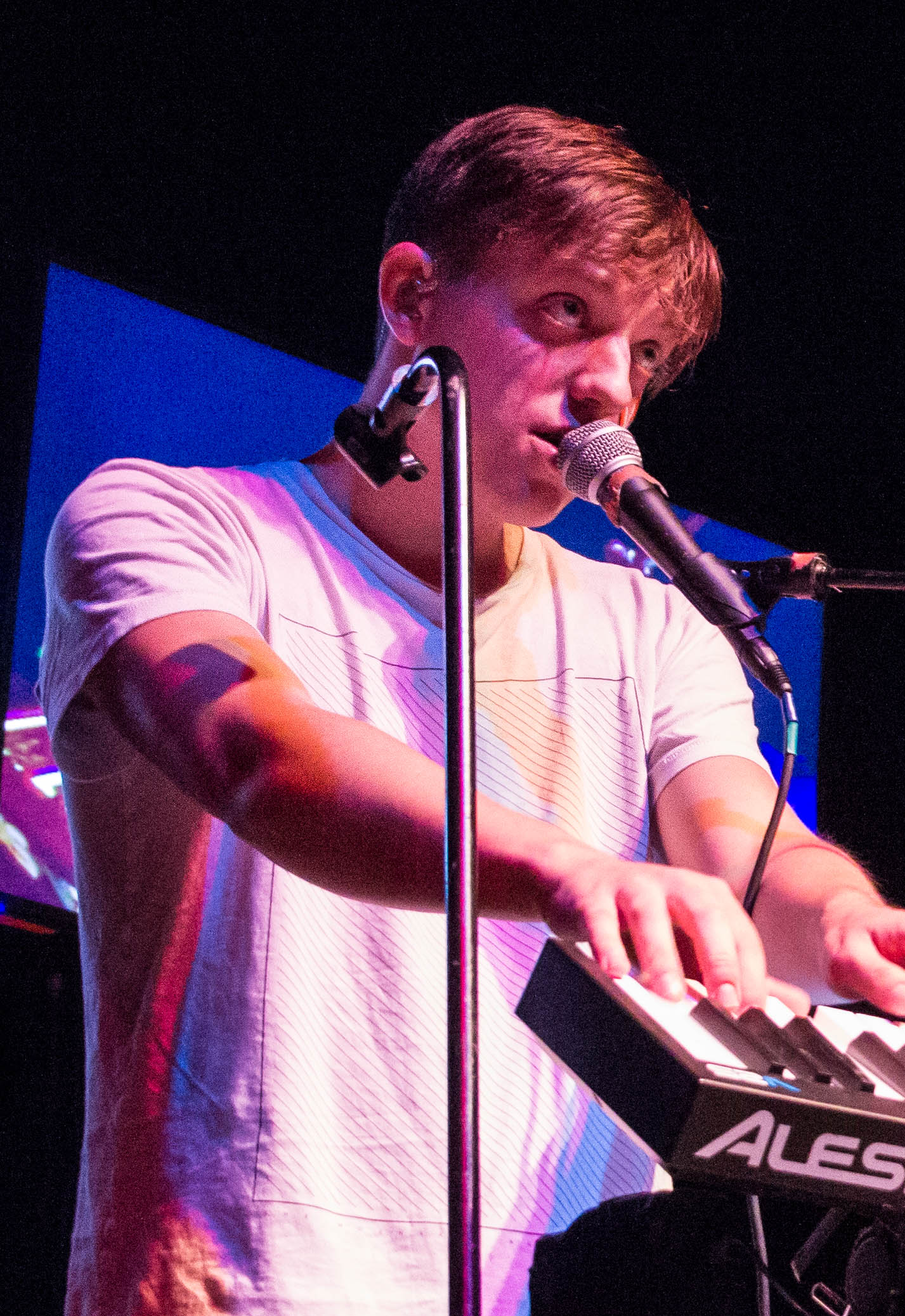
- Robert DeLong performing at CD102.5 Day 2015

Background information
- Born: Robert Charles Edward DeLong; February 18, 1986 (age 40)
- Origin: Bothell, Washington, U.S.
- Genres: Electronic, house, dubstep, rave
- Occupations: DJ, producer, musician
- Instruments: Keyboards, drums, vocals, sampler
- Years active: 2010–present
- Labels: Glassnote Records, Owsla
- Website: www.robertdelong.com

Robert Charles Edward DeLong (born February 18, 1986) is an American electronic musician from Bothell, Washington and currently residing in Los Angeles, California. With a background in percussion and influences from a number of indie rock bands, DeLong's primary genres include house, dubstep, and moombahton. He has released three full-length albums on Glassnote Records: Just Movement in January 2013, In the Cards in September 2015, and Walk Like Me in November 2021. His fourth studio album, Playlist of Doom, was released in September 2024.

== Early life ==
DeLong grew up in the Seattle suburb of Bothell. His father was a drummer. Robert played in various bands while he was in high school. He studied drums at Azusa Pacific University, partially supported by a scholarship. While in college, he played in the band The Denouement and settled in Los Angeles after graduation.

== Career ==
DeLong started as a drummer for indie rock bands but added more electronic elements to his compositions following his exposure to their use at raves. DeLong is notable for using video-game peripherals, such as a Wii remote and a joystick, connected to a MIDI interface, to modify his sound. He cites as influences Death Cab for Cutie, Modest Mouse, Dreamers, and Boards of Canada, among others. He released his first full-length album, Just Movement, on Glassnote Records on 5 February 2013. His sound has been described by Wired Magazine as a merger of "electronic dance music, alt rock, and vocals into tracks that are poppy enough to make you move but dissonant enough to be interesting." At live performances, facepaint is offered to fans; volunteer local artists organized and led by DeLong's longtime partner, visual artist Heidi Callaway, do the actual facepainting. Facepaint is a regular fixture of DeLong's performances and creates a sense of community amongst fans. His equipment and clothing feature an orange "X" logo; this same logo, or a variant of it, is often painted on his face and those in attendance. His 2018 single "My Favorite Color is Blue", featuring K. Flay, is included in the videogame soundtrack of NHL 19.

== Discography ==
=== Studio albums ===
List of studio albums, with selected chart positions
Title	Album details	Peak chart positions			Sales
Title	Album details	US Dance	US Heat	US Rock	Sales
Just Movement	Released: January 22, 2013; Label: Glassnote; Formats: Digital download, CD, Vinyl	18	34	—	US: 15,000
Long Way Down (EP)	Released: November 10, 2014; Label: Glassnote; Formats: Digital download, Vinyl	23	—	—	
In the Cards	Released: September 18, 2015; Label: Glassnote; Formats: Digital download, CD, Vinyl	—	9	46	
See You In the Future (EP)	Released: October 19, 2018; Label: Glassnote; Formats: Digital download, CD, Vinyl	—	—	—	
Walk Like Me	Released: November 19, 2021; Label: Glassnote; Formats: Digital download, CD	—	—	—	
Playlist of Doom	Released: September 13, 2024; Label: Round Hill Records; Formats: Digital download, CD, Vinyl	—	—	—	
"—" denotes a recording that did not chart or was not released in that territory.

=== Singles ===
Title	Year	Peak chart positions				Certifications	Album
Title	Year	US Adult	US Alt	US Rock Air.	AUS	Certifications	Album
"Global Concepts"	2012	—	33	—	22	ARIA: Platinum	Just Movement
"Long Way Down"	2014	38	3	9	—		In the Cards
"Don't Wait Up"	2015	—	19	29	—		In the Cards
"Better Days"	2015	—	—	—	—		Single-only release
"Favorite Color Is Blue" (featuring K.Flay)	2018	—	16	—	—		See You in the Future
"Revolutionary"	2018	—	31	—	—		See You in the Future
"First Person on Earth"	2018	—	35	—	—		See You in the Future
"Better in College" (featuring Ashe)	2020	—	—	—	—		Walk Like Me
"—" denotes a single that did not chart or was not released in that territory.
