= King Ruby =

2016 single by Ider

Single by Ider
- Released: 23 September 2016
- Genre: Synth pop
- Label: Self-released
- Songwriter(s): Elizabeth Somerville; Megan Markwick

Ider singles chronology
"Pulse" (2016)	"King Ruby" (2016)	"Million" (2016)

"King Ruby" is a song recorded by English singer-songwriter duo Ider. It was self-released on 23 September 2016. It features on the soundtrack of the 2017 Electronic Arts video game FIFA 18.

== Background and composition ==
"King Ruby" is the third single to be released by Ider, after "Sorry" and "Pulse" earlier in 2016. Ider released this single themselves as they didn't first sign with a record label until the following year.

The song was inspired by a friend of the duo, Ruby, who had been involved in an accident in India and undertook a large recovery.

== Critical reception ==
Writing for The Line of Best Fit, Andrew Hannah says that "[…] "King Ruby" as a whole is just superb. This is the sound of a band already well into their stride and racing ahead of the competition."

== Track listing ==
Digital download

1. "King Ruby" – 3:40
