= Let It Beep =

Studio album by Royal Bangs
- Released: September 15, 2009
- Recorded: 2009
- Genre: Indie rock, experimental rock
- Length: 50:32
- Label: Audio Eagle Records
- Producer: Ryan Schaefer

Royal Bangs chronology
We Breed Champions (2008)	Let It Beep (2009)	Flux Outside (2011)

Let It Beep is the second album by Royal Bangs. The album was released on September 15, 2009, on Audio Eagle Records, but was also released on City Slang Records.

== Reviews ==
Reviews for the album were positive. Rick Anderson of AllMusic noted, "For their second album, the Royal Bangs are back on Patrick Carney's Audio Eagle label, and their sound is, if anything, even more insane than it was the first time around. BBC Music editor, Mike Diver described it as "varied but never lacking cohesion, Let It Beep is a charming and entirely unforeseen hit for tastes demanding their rock a little rough-hewn and happily unaffected. That it makes KoL Kings of Leon sound as sonically redundant as U2 and Oasis is merely an accidental bonus."

== Track listing ==
No.	Title	Length
1.	"War Bells"	2:40
2.	"Poison Control"	4:29
3.	"My Car is Haunted"	3:41
4.	"Brainbow"	3:44
5.	"Conquest II"	3:14
6.	"B+E"	5:37
7.	"Shit Xmas"	1:56
8.	"Tiny Prince of Keytar"	3:31
9.	"1993"	5:38
10.	"Gorilla King"	4:28
11.	"Waking Up Weird"	4:42
12.	"Maniverse"	4:02

== Personnel ==
- Brandon Biondo – band member
- Henry Gibson – band member
- Chris Rusk – band member
- Ryan Schaefer – band member, producer
- Sam Stratton – band member
- Ben Vehorn – recording and mixing engineer
- Garrett Haines – mastering engineer
- Craig Branum – illustrator
- Michael Carney – layout
- Jody White – management
- Sam Hunt – booking
