= The Wild Swan =

Studio album by Foy Vance
- Released: 13 May 2016
- Recorded: Nashville
- Genre: Roots rock
- Length: 43:39
- Label: Gingerbread Man
- Producer: Jacquire King, Elton John

Foy Vance chronology
Joy of Nothing (2013)	The Wild Swan (2016)	From Muscle Shoals (2019)

The Wild Swan is the third album by Northern Ireland singer-songwriter, Foy Vance. On this album, Foy Vance channels a wide variety of styles. The song "Upbeat Feelgood" was compared to Van Morrison by the Irish Times. Elton John executive produced the album.

== Track listing ==
Every track written by Foy Vance, except "Ziggy Looked Me in the Eye" written by Vance and Marc Bolan

No.	Title	Length
1.	"Noam Chomsky Is a Soft Revolution"	2:28
2.	"Upbeat Feelgood"	3:23
3.	"Coco"	2:30
4.	"Casanova"	3:16
5.	"Bangor Town"	4:26
6.	"Burden"	3:33
7.	"She Burns"	3:48
8.	"Be Like You Belong"	4:48
9.	"Unlike Any Other"	4:15
10.	"Ziggy Looked Me in the Eye" (Marc Bolan / Foy Vance)	4:01
11.	"Fire It Up (The Silver Spear)"	4:04
12.	"The Wild Swans on the Lake"	3:07

== Personnel ==
Adapted from AllMusic:

- Foy Vance – keyboards, guitar, mando-guitar, vocals
- Eric Darken – chimes, percussion, vibraphone
- Mike Farris – backing vocals
- Clare Hadwen – violin
- Richard Hadwen – viola
- Paul Hamilton – drums, percussion, backing vocals
- Leisa Hans – backing vocals
- Jim Hoke – piano, saxophone
- Alys Jackson – violin
- Tim Lauer – accordion, dulcimer, keyboards, harmonium
- Kolton Lee – baritone guitar
- Colm McClean – guitar, steel guitar, Mandocaster
- Conor McCreanor – bass guitar, double bass
- Blake Mills – slide guitar
- Darragh Murphy – low whistle, Uilleann pipes
- Ryan Rafferty – bagpipes
- Heather Rigdon – backing vocals
- David Sloan – cello
- Ashley Wilcoxson – backing vocals
- Jonathan Yudkin – fiddle, octophone, strings, backing vocals
