= Justin Nozuka =

American musician (born 1988)

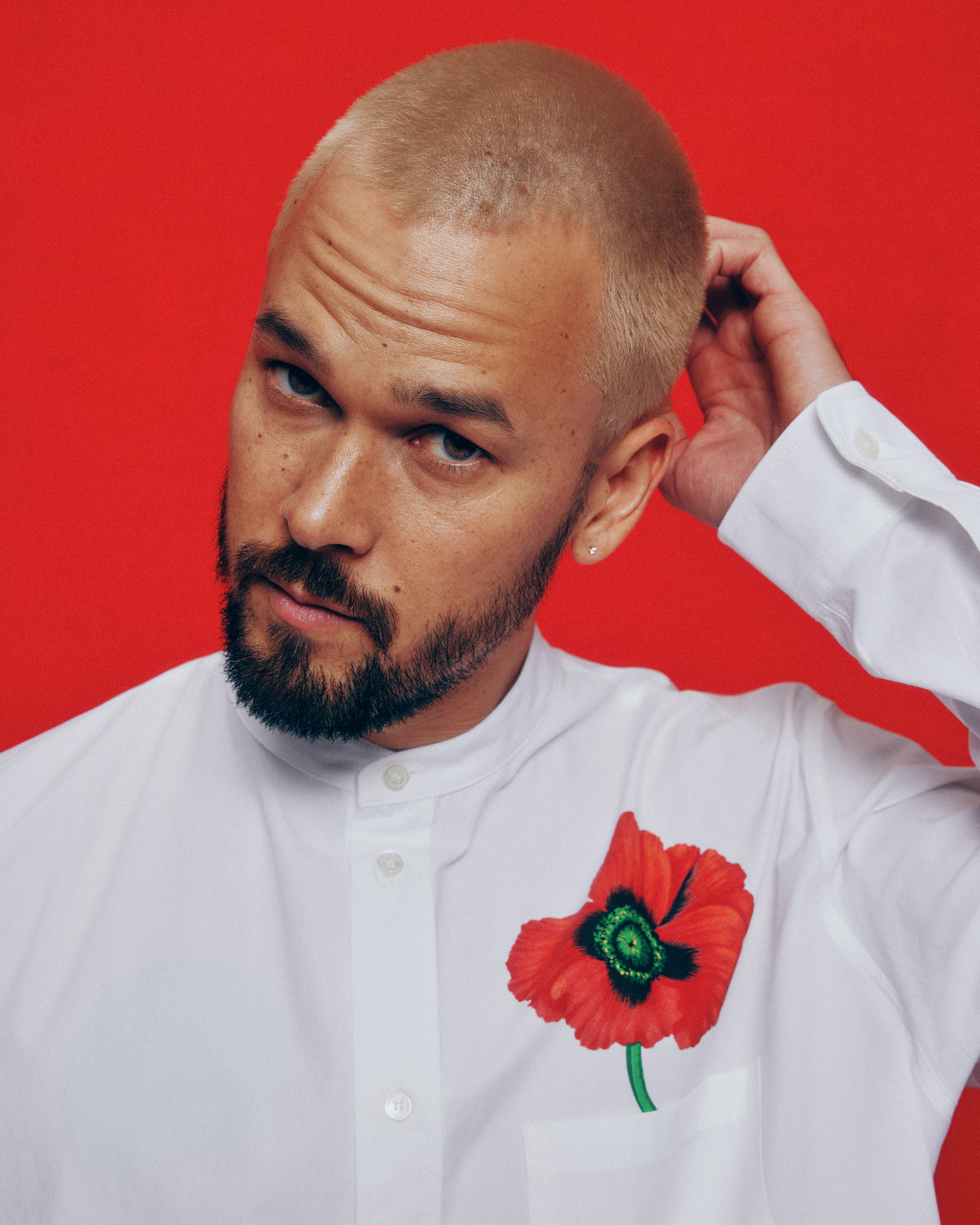
- Nozuka in 2022
- Born: Justin Tokimitsu Nozuka; September 29, 1988 (age 38); New York City, U.S.
- Occupation: Musician
- Relatives: George Nozuka (brother); Philip Nozuka (brother)
- Musical career
- Origin: New York City, U. S.
- Genres: Folk; R&B
- Instruments: Vocals
- Years active: 2006–present
- Labels: Warner; Glassnote (US); Coalition Music Records; Outcaste (UK/EU)
- Website: justinnozuka.com

Justin Tokimitsu Nozuka (ノズカ・ジャスティン, Nozuka Jasutin; born September 29, 1988) is an American singer, songwriter, and actor of Japanese and Canadian descent. His debut album, Holly, was released in 2007. He has since published five more studio albums: You I Wind Land and Sea (2010), Ulysees (2014), Run to Waters (2018), Daydreams & Endless Nights (2023), and Chlorine (2024).

== Life and career ==
Nozuka was born in Queens, New York, as one of seven children to Canadian mother Holly Sedgwick and Japanese father Hiromitsu Nozuka. Sedgwick raised Nozuka and his six siblings as a single mother in Bloor West Village, Ontario. He is the brother of musician George Nozuka and actor Philip Nozuka. His mother's half-sister is actress Kyra Sedgwick and his first cousin twice removed is Edie Sedgwick.

Nozuka began to write songs at the age of twelve. The earliest of his compositions from Holly, "Supposed to Grow Old" and "I'm in Peace", were written when he was fifteen. His musical influences stem from artists such as Lauryn Hill and Marvin Gaye, among others.

With help from fellow Canadian artist Damhnait Doyle, whom he met at a songwriting workshop, Nozuka was introduced to Universal Records talent scout Allan Reid. He recorded three tracks through Universal with Bill Bell as producer, leading Universal to offer him a contract. However, he decided to "record an album on (his) own, with (his) own freedom".

In 2007, Nozuka released his debut album, Holly, named after his mother, who supported his chosen career in music. The album has eleven songs and includes the hidden track "If I Gave You My Life". Many of the songs deal with mature themes, such as "Save Him", which is a fictional account of a woman abused by her husband. Another track, "Down in a Cold Dirty Well", is about his perspective being stuck in a well, watching his life flash before his eyes. "Criminal" describes the story of a drunken man facing the consequences of throwing a bottle into a street "where children play with bare feet" and suffers overwhelming guilt. In February 2008, Nozuka was nominated for a Juno award in the New Artist of the Year category, following the commercial and critical success of Holly.

In 2009, Nozuka began working on his second studio album while touring and playing live shows in Europe. The record, titled You I Wind Land and Sea, was released in the US on April 13, 2010, and debuted at Number 118 on the Billboard 200 Albums Chart.

In November 2011, Nozuka collaborated with the Slakadeliqs on their single "Love Controls the Sun", from their debut album, The Other Side of Tomorrow.

Nozuka has performed the song "Gone" in his live shows but has yet to include it on an album. Wu-Tang Clan member RZA came across the track and decided to sample it. Joined by Kobra Khan, James Black, and Nozuka, they released the song, also titled "Gone," in October 2011 as a tribute to former Wu-Tang Clan member Ol' Dirty Bastard.

Nozuka has also had various acting roles, including an appearance on Degrassi: The Next Generation as Chuck Hosada, the fictional brother to recurring character Chester, played by Nozuka's real-life brother Philip. George Nozuka also appeared in the same episode, playing the third brother, Chad.

In April 2014, Nozuka released his third studio album, Ulysees. After spending 2010 touring, he took a break to produce the record himself, resulting in a four-year gap between releases. The album is backed by the singles "Right by You" and "Sweet Lover". In 2018, Nozuka issued his fourth album, Run to Waters, and in June 2023, he followed it with Daydreams & Endless Nights. His sixth, Chlorine, came out in September 2024. He toured Canada and the United States to support the album.

In 2025, Nozuka issued a trio of lo-fi EPs titled 一, 二, and 三 , which are the Japanese Kanji characters for one, two, and three, respectively. 二 includes a cover of the 1939 ballad "Somewhere Over the Rainbow", sung with his brother George. In 2026, Nozuka embarked on a series of "unplugged" shows across Canada and the United States.

== Discography ==
=== Studio albums ===
Title	Details	Peak positions				
Title	Details	US	US Heat	US Indie	DU	FR
Holly	Released: March 19, 2007; Label: Outcaste, Glassnote; Format: CD, digital	–	6	30	79	23
You I Wind Land and Sea	Released: April 13, 2010; Label: Outcaste, Glassnote; Format: CD, digital	118	1	13	40	45
Ulysees	Released: April 15, 2014; Label: Warner, Glassnote; Format: CD, digital	–	49	–	–	–
Run to Waters	Released: May 18, 2018; Label: Warner, Caroline; Format: LP, CD, digital	–	–	–	–	–
Daydreams & Endless Nights	Released: June 16, 2023; Label: Black Box Recordings; Format: digital	–	–	–	–	–
Chlorine	Released: September 20, 2024; Label: post 1988; Format: digital	–	–	–	–	–
"—" denotes album that did not chart or was not released

=== EPs ===
Title	Details	Peak positions
Title	Details	US Heat
iTunes Festival: London – Justin Nozuka (Live)	Released: 2007; Label: Format:	–
Blue Velvet Sea: The Sessions EP	Released: May 31, 2011; Label: Warner, Glassnote; Format: digital	50
Chestnut Spoke to Maple	Released: December 11, 2015; Label: Coalition Music; Format: digital	–
High Tide	Released: September 22, 2017; Label: Glassnote; Format: digital	–
Low Tide	Released: February 16, 2018; Label: Glassnote; Format: digital	–
Then, Now & Again	Released: April 9, 2021; Label: Black Box Music; Format: digital	–
Now & Again (Live from Revolution Recording)	Released: July 23, 2021; Label: Black Box Music; Format: digital	–
(CI)	Released: July 31, 2024; Label: post 1988; Format: digital	–
一	Released: February 28, 2025; Label: post 1988; Format: digital	–
二	Released: September 29, 2025; Label: post 1988; Format: digital	–
三	Released: December 5, 2025; Label: post 1988; Format: digital	–
"—" denotes album that did not chart or was not released

=== Singles ===
Title	Year	Peak chart positions			Album
Title	Year	US	CA	CA AC	Album
"After Tonight"	2007	– (Note: "After Tonight" did not enter the Billboard Hot 100 but peaked at number seventeen on the Bubbling Under Hot 100 Singles chart.)	–	–	Holly
"Mr. Therapy Man"	2007	–	–	–	Holly
"Criminal"	2007	–	–	–	Holly
"Be Back Soon"	2008	–	–	–	Holly
"Golden Train"	2009	–	–	–	Holly
"My Heart Is Yours"	2010	–	–	–	You I Wind Land and Sea
"Heartless"	2010	–	93	14	You I Wind Land and Sea
"Right by You"	2014	–	–	–	Ulysees
"Sweet Lover"	2014	–	–	–	Ulysees
"By Your Side"	2015	–	–	–	Chestnut Spoke to Maple
"All I Need"	2017	–	–	–	Run to Waters
"Warm Under the Light"	2018	–	–	–	Run to Waters
"No One but You" (feat. Mahalia)	2020	–	–	–	Then, Now & Again
"Summer Night o8"	2021	–	–	–	Then, Now & Again
"Nova"	2021	–	–	–	non-album single
"Said I Don't Cry"	2023	–	–	–	non-album single
"444"	2023	–	–	–	Daydreams & Endless Nights
"Dwell"	2023	–	–	–	Daydreams & Endless Nights
"Twyn"	2023	–	–	–	non-album singles
"Crescent"	2023	–	–	–	non-album singles
"Lay Down" (with Amaal Nuxx)	2023	–	–	–	non-album singles
"Tell Her" (with River Tiber)	2024	–	–	–	non-album singles
"Stranger" (with River Tiber)	2024	–	–	–	non-album singles
"Orange Lampshade"	2024	–	–	–	(CI) and Chlorine
"Chlorine – A Colors Show"	2024	–	–	–	non-album single
"Chlorine"	2024	–	–	–	(CI) and Chlorine
"Right by You (Live at Mahogany)"	2025	–	–	–	non-album singles
"Moonlight Radiator" (with Elijah Fox)	2025	–	–	–	non-album singles
"Somewhere Over the Rainbow" (with George Nozuka)	2025	–	–	–	二
"—" denotes single that did not chart or was not released

=== Guest appearances ===
Title	Year	Other artist(s)	Album
"Bad Fog of Loneliness"	2007	—N/a	Borrowed Tunes II: A Tribute to Neil Young
"At Long Last You"	2007	Joe Sbrocchi	Fatlabs Studio
"At the Same Time"	2010	Shad	TSOL
"Love Controls the Sun"	2011	The Slakadeliqs	The Other Side of Tomorrow
"Keep Breathing"	2011	The Slakadeliqs	The Other Side of Tomorrow
"Come Back Home"	2012	Perfeck Strangers	Series Premiere
"Flood"	2016	River Tiber	Indigo
"I Won't Live Until I Die"	2017	Morgan Cameron Ross	—N/a
"The Only Difference"	2017	Beatchild, the Slakadeliqs	Heavy Rockin' Steady
"The Only Difference" [Bakermat Rework]	2019	Beatchild, Bakermat	—N/a
"Taurus"	2019	River Tiber	—N/a
"Blossom"	2021	Zacari	Sol

=== Music videos ===
- "Mr. Therapy Man" (Holly, 2007)
- "Criminal" (Holly, 2007 and 2009)
- "After Tonight" (Holly, 2007)
- "Be Back Soon" (Holly, 2008)
- "Golden Train" (Holly, 2009)
- "My Heart Is Yours" (You I Wind Land and Sea, 2010)
- "Heartless" (You I Wind Land and Sea, 2010)
- "Gone" (with RZA, Kobra Khan, and James Black) (2011)
- "Love Controls the Sun" (with The Slakadeliqs, 2011)
- "Keep Breathing" (with The Slakadeliqs, 2011)
- "Right by You" (Ulysees, 2014)
- "Sweet Lover" (Ulysees, 2014)
- "By Your Side" (Chestnut Spoke to Maple, 2015)
- "All I Need" (High Tide, 2017)
- "Warm Under the Light" (Low Tide, 2018)
- "No One But You" (ft. Mahalia) (2020)
- "Summer Night o8" (2021)
- "Nova" (2021)
- "444" (2023)
- "Orange Lampshade" (2024)
- "Chlorine" (2024)
- "Paranoid" (2024)
