= Joy of Nothing =

Studio album by Foy Vance
- Released: 26 August 2013
- Recorded: 2013 in Donegal, Ireland
- Genre: Alternative rock; folk rock
- Length: 41:22
- Label: Glassnote
- Producer: Michael Keeney

Foy Vance chronology
The Melrose EP (2012)	Joy of Nothing (2013)	The Wild Swan (2016)

Singles from Joy of Nothing
- 1. "Joy of Nothing" Released: 25 February 2013; 2. "Janey" Released: 10 June 2013

Professional ratings
Review scores
Source	Rating
AllMusic	3.5/5 stars
The Irish Times	4/5 stars

Joy of Nothing is the second studio album by Northern Irish singer-songwriter Foy Vance. It was released on 26 August 2013.

== Background ==
The album was inspired by Vance's relocation to the Scottish highlands.

== Critical reception ==
AllMusic wrote that the album is "not afraid of making a grandiose statement, both musically and lyrically." No Depression wrote: "Even if there aren’t a lot of fireworks going off on this one, Vance’s mellifluous brogue and poet’s soul are more than enough to get you started on a Foy diet you’ll never want to come off of."

== Track listing ==
All tracks are written by Foy Vance.

No.	Title	Length
1.	"Closed Hand, Full of Friends"	4:03
2.	"Joy of Nothing"	5:02
3.	"At Least My Heart Was Open"	3:39
4.	"You and I" (with Bonnie Raitt)	4:30
5.	"Feel for Me"	3:55
6.	"Janey"	3:59
7.	"Paper Prince"	3:17
8.	"It Was Good"	4:02
9.	"Regarding Your Lover"	3:00
10.	"Guiding Light" (featuring Ed Sheeran)	5:51

== Personnel ==
- Foy Vance – vocals, acoustic guitar, electric guitar, baritone guitar, additional piano
- Michael Keeney – piano, mini moog, sounds, fender rhodes, melotron
- Colm McClean – electric guitar, acoustic rhythm guitar, pedal steel guitar
- Paul 'Hammy' Hamilton – drums, percussion, backing vocals
- Conor McCreanor – electric bass, upright bass
- Bonnie Raitt – vocals (track 4)
- Ed Sheeran – vocals (track 10)
- The Arco String Quartet
  - Clare Hadwen – violin
  - Kathleen Gillespie – violins
  - Richard Hadwen – viola
  - Kerry Brady – cello
