= Foy Vance =

Northern Irish singer-songwriter

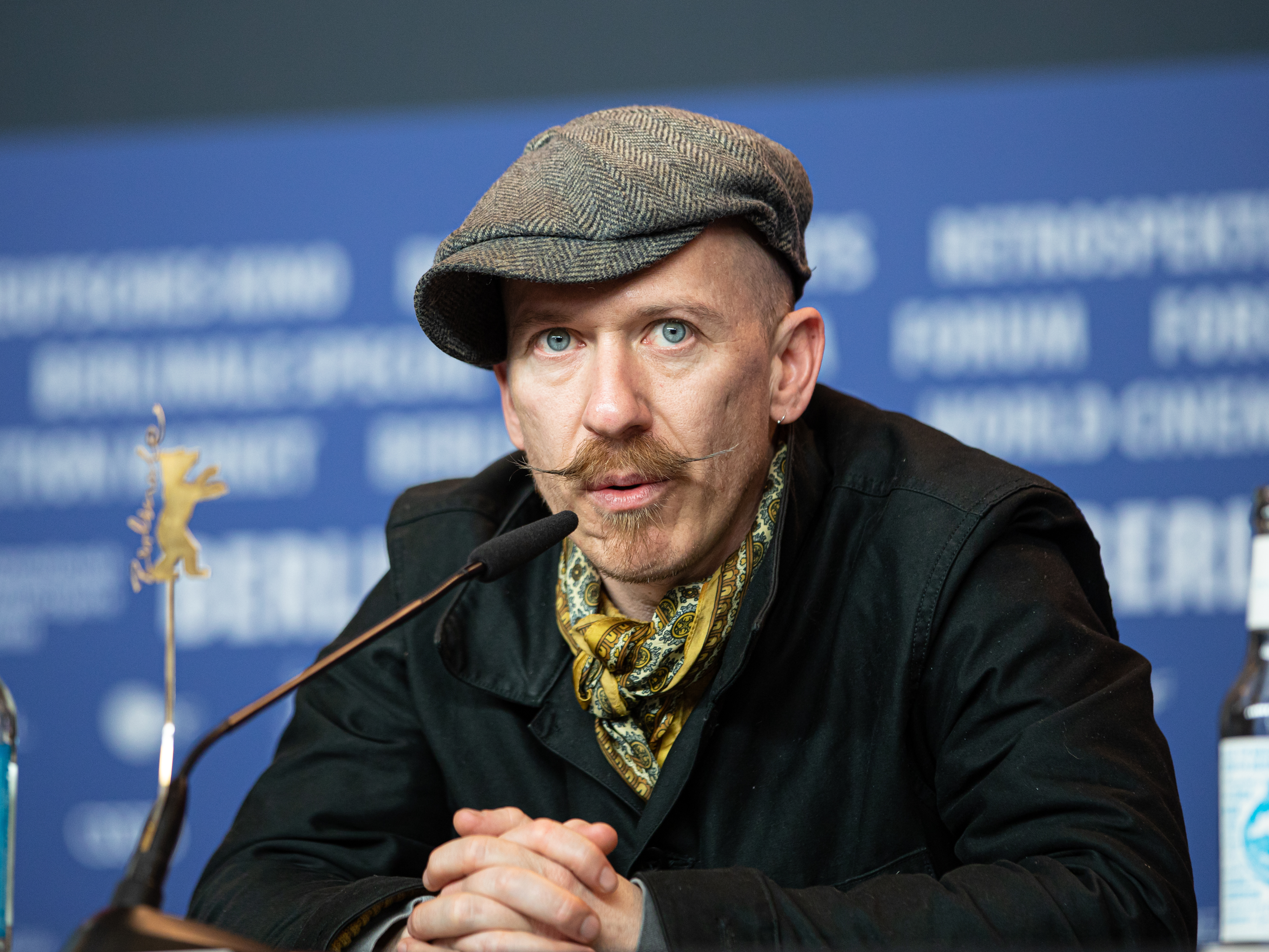
- Vance at the 2018; Berlin International Film Festival

Background information
- Born: Foy Best Vance; 18 November 1974 (age 51); Bangor, County Down, Northern Ireland
- Genres: Alternative rock; folk; blues
- Occupations: Musician; singer-songwriter
- Instruments: Vocals; guitar; piano
- Years active: 2006–present
- Labels: Glassnote; Gingerbread Man
- Website: foyvance.com

Foy Best Vance (born 18 November 1974) is a Northern Irish musician and singer-songwriter, signed to Ed Sheeran's Gingerbread Man record label. Vance has toured as a support act to Sheeran and his music has been featured on numerous TV shows.

In August 2013 he released his second full-length album, Joy of Nothing, which was produced by Irish producer and arranger Michael Keeney and was met with critical praise, being called "a gorgeous collection of open, uplifting songs, which showcase [Vance's] magnificent songwriting skills." In May 2016, his third studio album The Wild Swan, produced and mixed by Jacquire King, was released and it was announced that Vance would support Elton John on selected tour dates in June and Josh Groban in July and August.

== Music career ==
=== 2006–2011: Early career and Hope ===
Vance's first single, "Gabriel and the Vagabond", was released on 18 December 2006 on Wurdamouth Records. The single's B-side was "Indiscriminate Act of Kindness". The songs "Homebird" and "Gabriel and the Vagabond" were both featured in the second season of the US TV drama Grey's Anatomy.

"Indiscriminate Act of Kindness" is featured in a TV commercial for Great Ormond Street Hospital, which was aired in the UK up until Christmas of 2006. Vance had previously released two limited edition EPs on Wurdamouth Records, Live Sessions and the Birth Toilet Tour and Watermelon Oranges.

On 21 July 2007, Vance's debut album, Hope, was self-released via Wurdamouth Records. The album obtained some critical acclaim within the UK with the album track "Two Shades of Hope", which contains a hidden recording of Vance's daughter, Ella, singing "You Are My Sunshine" at the end. His pianist at the time was London based composer Jules Maxwell.

From 2007, Vance performed his contemporary songs at Ireland's largest annual Christian youth festival Summer Madness at the King's Hall, Belfast for several consecutive years.

In early 2008, Vance was invited to perform at a number of prisons in England, including New Hall women's prison near Wakefield and Full Sutton maximum security prison near York.

In 2010, Vance, along with David Holmes, composed the music for a short film by director Terry George, and as a result was offered a part in the director's next feature film, Whole Lotta Sole, as a busker. The short film, The Shore, won a 2012 Academy Award.

=== 2011–2012: The Melrose EP ===
On 31 January 2011, Vance went to Los Angeles to finish the recording of The Melrose EP with Holmes. During his trip to L.A., Vance put on a special show for fans.

As part of Belfast Music Week 2011, Vance hosted a hoedown branded as "Foy Vance and Friends". It featured a spread of Vance's close friends from Belfast who joined him on the stage.

During 2012's South by Southwest festival in Austin, Texas, Vance was programmed as part of Brooklyn Vegan's tribute event to Daniel Johnston.

On 27 August 2012, Vance released The Melrose EP, on Communion Records. The EP featured four new tracks which were produced by Holmes. The EP makes up the score of Terry George's Academy Award winning film The Shore and the lead track from the EP, "Be the Song" has featured on episodes of Private Practice, House, Arrow, Haven and Constantine in addition to the film Warm Bodies.

Vance performed at BBC's Proms in the Park in Belfast on 8 September 2012. In late 2012, Vance was one of the support acts for British artist Ed Sheeran's UK tour. As well as his support slot on the tour, Vance came on stage during Sheeran's main set to duet on his song "Kiss Me" from Sheeran's album +. Vance went on to support Sheeran on the US-leg of his tour, where the pair again duetted on "Kiss Me". Sheeran has also been known to cover Vance's song "Guiding Light", which often closes Vance's headline sets.

=== 2013: Joy of Nothing ===
In early 2013, Vance signed with Glassnote Records and completed his new album, Joy of Nothing, which was released on 26 August. The album announcement was accompanied by a music video for the song "Joy of Nothing" which featured Vance and his daughter Ella. The album includes vocal features from Bonnie Raitt and Ed Sheeran, the latter of whom expressed his excitement for the release. On 10 June 2013, Vance released a 22-minute documentary, Recording Nothing, showing the process of writing and recording the album.

Vance performed at Tennent's Vital on 15 August 2013 along with headliners Snow Patrol, and also toured with Bonnie Raitt throughout the UK. He and Sheeran traded cameos, with Sheeran joining Vance on stage at the Bowery Ballroom on 4 November 2013 and Vance joining Sheeran at Madison Square Garden on 7 November 2013.

On 12 November 2013, Joy of Nothing won the inaugural Northern Ireland Music Prize for best album. Other nominees included Tired Pony, Girls Names, and Two Door Cinema Club.

=== 2015–2018: The Wild Swan ===
In July 2015, Vance appeared at the Barn on the Farm festival at Over Farm, Over, near Gloucester and recorded a number of session for the festival's YouTube channel.

In November 2015, Vance signed with Sheeran's Gingerbread Man Records, and on 13 May 2016, he released his third studio album, The Wild Swan. Reviewing the album for the London Evening Standard, Andre Paine commented: "[...] after a decade as a jobbing songwriter, Vance deserves a commercial breakthrough."

In May 2016, it was announced that Vance would support Elton John in June on selected dates of his Wonderful Crazy Tour in Europe. On 10 September, Vance embarked on his Wild Swan World Tour with a sold-out performance in Perth. After Australia, the tour was scheduled to include dates in North America, the UK and Europe.

Vance co-wrote the song "Pushin' Time" with Miranda Lambert and Natalie Hemby that appeared on Lambert's album The Weight of These Wings, which was released in November 2016.

In December 2016, Vance released the single "Moonshine", which appeared on the soundtrack for the Ben Affleck film Live by Night. "Moonshine" features Kacey Musgraves and is meant to pay tribute to "the films strong female characters", whilst telling "the story of a bootlegger running moonshine". In January 2017 a music video was released for "Moonshine" and premiered on Billboard.com.

=== 2019–present: From Muscle Shoals and To Memphis ===
In June 2019, Vance released a new album, From Muscle Shoals, a collection of Americana-inspired songs recorded at FAME Studios in Muscle Shoals, Alabama.

In July 2019, he released the dubstep/future bass song "Blood" in collaboration with the American DJ and producer Illenium. It represents the sixth single from Illenium's studio album Ascend. In September 2019, he released a new album, To Memphis. In September 2021, he released a new album, Signs of Life.

In January 2024, at the 75th Primetime Creative Arts Emmy Awards, Vance, along with Ed Sheeran and Max Martin, won an Emmy for Outstanding Original Music and Lyrics, for the song A Beautiful Game, which appeared in an episode of the Apple TV+ show Ted Lasso.

== Television ==
On 4 June 1994, Vance appeared as Andrew Strong of The Commitments on the TV talent show Stars in Their Eyes. In 2012, his music was used in several episodes of The CW series Beauty and the Beast.

In 2007, Vance appeared on RTE's Other Voices, filmed in Dingle, Ireland. Vance took part in the Channel 4 series 4Thought.tv, where he spoke about how profound he found the hymn, "Amazing Grace", how it impacted him hearing a vagabond at Ground Zero, New York, playing this song. A Channel 4 documentary about Vance, covered all aspects of his career from him growing up, playing shows in Ireland, playing a show in New York with Pete Townshend, and organically recording his debut album Hope. In September 2011, Vance joined Snow Patrol on the BBC Two's Later... with Jools Holland, to perform their single, "Fallen Empires". In May 2015, Vance appeared with Rudimental on Later with Jools Holland. Vance presents Notes from the USA on Euronews.

== Discography ==
=== Albums ===
- Hope (Wurdamouth Records, 2007)
- Joy of Nothing (Glassnote Records, 2013)
- The Wild Swan (Gingerbread Man, 13 May 2016) No. 28 UK, No. 10 IRE, No. 87 AUS
- From Muscle Shoals (Gingerbread Man, 28 June 2019)
- To Memphis (Gingerbread Man, 6 September 2019)
- Signs of Life (Gingerbread Man, 10 September 2021)
- The Wake (An Eala Fiain Ltd., Distributed by Concord, 13 March 2026)

=== EPs ===
- Blueprints (2000)
- Live Sessions and the Birth of the Toilet Tour (2005)
- Watermelon Oranges (2006)
- Gabriel and the Vagabond (2006)
- Be with Me Remix by The Free Association (2008)
- Portraits of the Artist (2009)
- Time Lays Low (2009)
- Live with the Ulster Orchestra at the Waterfront Hall Belfast (2009)
- Melrose (2012)
