= Jonas Sees in Color (album) =

Studio album by Jonas Sees in Color
- Released: September 29, 2009
- Recorded: Candyland Studios; Denver, Colorado
- Genre: Rock, alternative, indie, pop
- Length: 38:30
- Label: Glassnote
- Producer: Aaron Johnson

Jonas Sees in Color chronology
Jonas Sees in Color (2009)	Give Me Mine (2013)

Jonas Sees in Color is the debut album by American rock band Jonas Sees in Color, released on September 29, 2009, by Glassnote Records. It was produced by Aaron Johnson at Candyland Studios in Denver, Colorado, the same studio used by The Fray to record their first two albums. The record was engineered by Warren Huart.

== Track listing ==
No.	Title	Length
1.	"I Own These Streets"	3:27
2.	"Luck and Love"	3:24
3.	"Avalanche"	3:54
4.	"Stand Tall"	3:15
5.	"Loose Threads"	3:14
6.	"For the Fences"	2:56
7.	"West Coast"	3:37
8.	"Sky Keeps Falling"	3:39
9.	"Devil in the City"	2:30
10.	"Outside These Walls"	3:15
11.	"Water on the Rise"	5:21

== B-sides ==
While in the studio, Jonas Sees in Color recorded other songs which weren't put on the album. These songs include "South is Home" and an alternative version of "Sky Keeps Falling" which was piano-only.

== Personnel ==
Jonas Sees in Color

- Ryan Downing – Vocals, lyrics
- Jonathan Owens – Guitar
- Jonathan Albright - Guitar
- Mikey Deming - Bass
- Meagan Beth Plummer - Piano
- John Chester – Drums and percussion
