= Givers =

American band

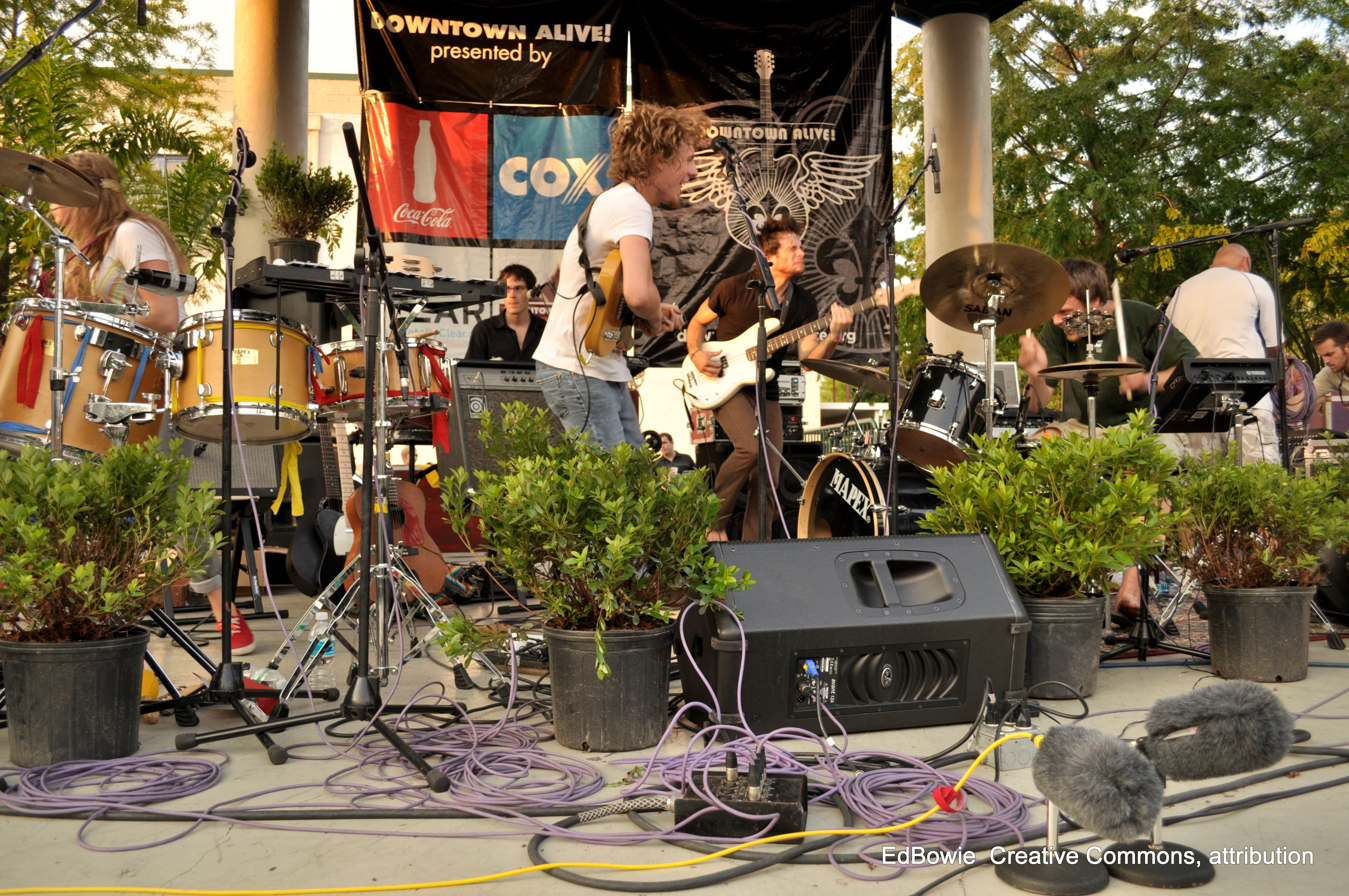
- Givers live in Lafayette in 2010

Background information
- Origin: Lafayette, Louisiana, US
- Genres: Indie pop, worldbeat
- Years active: 2008–present
- Labels: Glassnote, Valcour
- Members: Tiffany Lamson; Taylor Guarisco; Josh LeBlanc
- Past members: William Henderson; Kirby Campbell; Nick Stephan

Givers is an indie pop group from Lafayette, Louisiana. The band is made up of vocalist and percussionist Tiffany Lamson, vocalist and guitarist Taylor Guarisco, and bassist and guitarist Josh LeBlanc. The band's origins date to Hurricane Katrina in 2005, which displaced Lamson and Guarisco from their New Orleans apartment and school, leading them to return to Lafayette with little to do. The duo began playing music together, and they recruited the other members shortly before a last-minute performance at a local pub in 2008. The band came together as the result of the unplanned, improvised jam.

The members of Givers have previously performed in zydeco, jazz and Cajun groups. Following a touring stint with the Dirty Projectors and their debut 2009 EP, the band recorded their debut album and signed to Glassnote Records. The band's debut studio album, In Light, was released in June 2011 to favorable critical reviews.

== History ==
=== Early years and formation (2005-09) ===
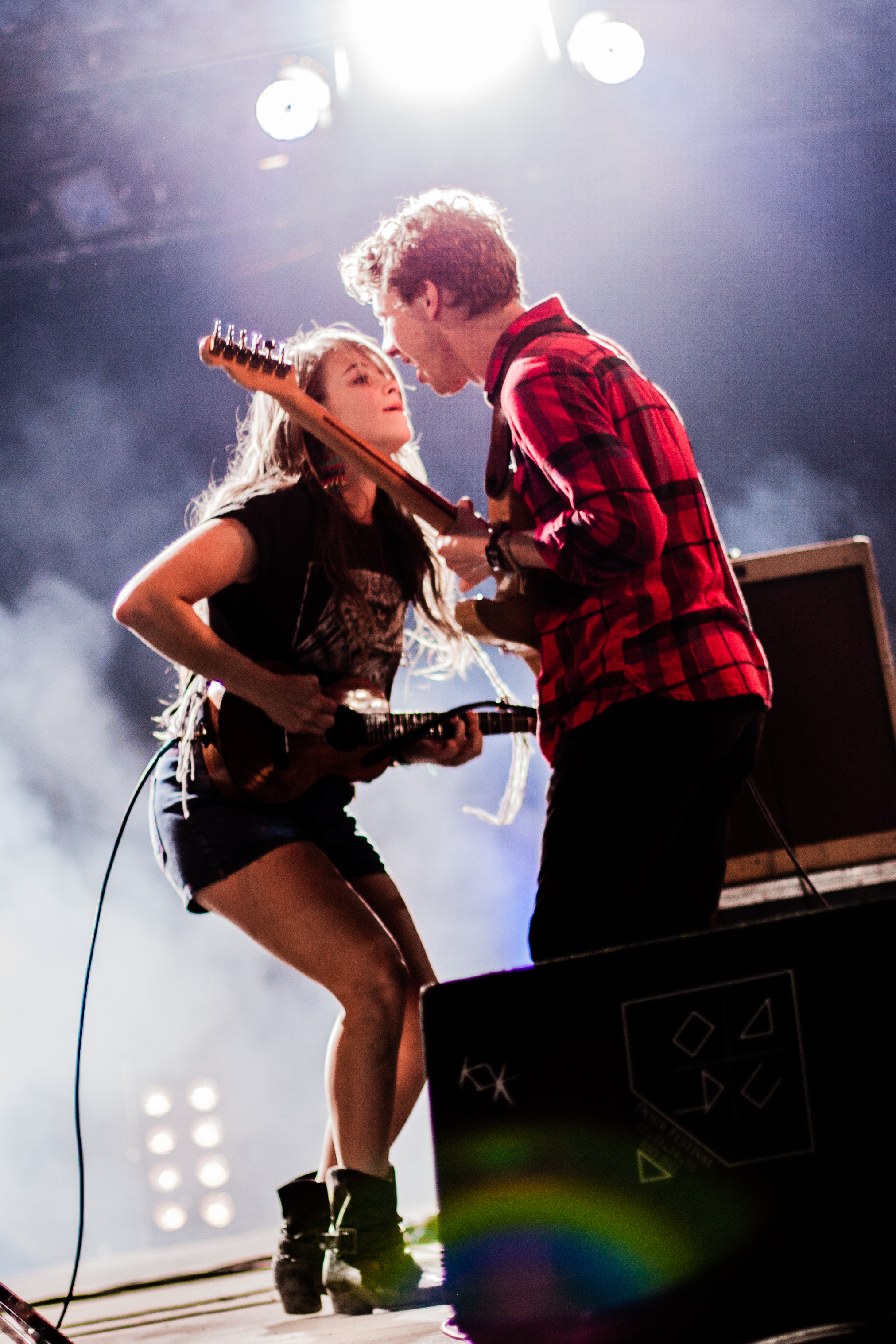

Givers was formed in 2008 in Lafayette, Louisiana by Tiffany Lamson, Taylor Guarisco, Kirby Campbell, Josh LeBlanc, William Henderson, and Nick Stephan. The band members knew one another from high school in Lafayette, where "there's two or three clubs that everybody plays at and supports each other." Guarisco had toured with a zydeco band, while the other future members dabbled in Cajun and jazz music. Lamson grew up with gospel music as her parents were pastors, and she sang in their church band. The band's earliest origins date to when Hurricane Katrina hit in August 2005. Lamson had just started her freshman year at the University of New Orleans. Guarisco and Lamson were rooming together when the storm hit, leaving them with roughly 15 feet of water in their apartment. With school on hold and nowhere to live, the duo returned home and began making music together and performing at open mic nights. While Lafayette was "suitably anonymous" before the disaster, nearly 30,000 people moved to the city following the tragedy, resulting an "explosion in culture."

Givers came together in 2008, when Lamson and Guarisco recruited Kirby Campbell, Will Henderson and Josh LeBlanc for a two-hour slot at a Lafayette pub. Lamson and Guarisco had never sung prior to joining the band, and Josh LeBlanc was a jazz trumpeter before learning the bass. The unnamed band hopped on the last-minute slot after another local band dropped off the bill, and improvised the entire set. They were phoned by the pub and invited back, and they continued to perform improvised sets. "That was how some of those songs were created, that total free-form state where we just played and recorded and then excerpted and rearranged," Guarisco later said. The band scoured their record libraries looking for interesting song titles they could narrow down for a band name; Guarisco picked a Lucky Dragons song called "Givers." The band recorded their debut EP in Campbell's bedroom, and released it online for free in 2009. After the newly christened Givers performed at Baton Rouge's stalwart music hall Spanish Moon, booking agent Aaron Scruggs gave the band what would become one of the "major accidents that became very fruitful occurrences," according to Guarisco. For their Baton Rouge show, Dirty Projectors had a rare opening slot, and Scruggs gave it to Givers, who had been performing only part-time since their 2008 formation. Dirty Projectors was one of Guarisco's favorite bands. Frontman Dave Longstreth subsequently invited the band along as support for an East Coast tour.

=== Mainstream success (2010-2014) ===
The band recorded their debut album in January 2010 at the "magical, swampy [and] historical" Dockside Studios in Maurice, Louisiana, which had previously hosted acts such as B.B. King, Derek Trucks, Mavis Staples and Dr. John. The group cooped up in guest rooms along the banks of the Vermilion Bayou in Maurice, and spent 20 days recording the album. In contrast to their debut EP, which was recorded in Campbell's bedroom and sporadically recorded with a list of limitations, they viewed Dockside as a virtual utopia in contrast. As they were completely separated from city life—"You can't hear cars, there's no light pollution," said Guarisco—they never found themselves distracted, simply waking up to record until "[we] were dead tired" in the late night. Each song from the band's debut EP was re-recorded and revamped.

Ra Ra Riot also discovered the band and booked the band for its 2010 tour. The band's performance at the 2010 Austin City Limits festival led to a record deal with Glassnote, who had executives in the audience. Label founder Daniel Glass had run a mile from his train to the venue to catch the performance, and was "mesmerized," later explaining "It was a visceral moment for me. I don't fall in love a lot. The only time this happened to me was when I walked into a brasserie in Paris and I met Phoenix." The band signed to Glassnote Records on February 1, 2011. In 2011, Henderson was replaced by Nick Stephan, and the group released their first full-length album In Light on June 7. On June 13, they performed "Up Up Up", the first single off the album, on Late Night with Jimmy Fallon.

In Light was immensely successful for the young group. Every song from In Light was licensed for usage in film and television, on programs such as Glee, and on video games such as FIFA 12. The band attracted the praise of veteran musician Neil Young, who referred to the band in his 2012 memoir Waging Heavy Peace: A Hippie Dream: "It sounded like they were in a complete other zone from the rest of music. They blew my mind," Young wrote. The band performed at several music festivals in 2012, including Coachella, Lollapalooza, and the New Orleans Jazz Fest. They also performed with New Orleans' Preservation Hall Jazz Band as part of their 50th Anniversary at Carnegie Hall in January 2012.

=== Recent years (2015–present) ===
Following three years of touring, the band took a brief break. The group suffered from an identity crisis; Guarisco admitted to "a few months of losing perspective on what we thought we were." They regrouped to work on their second album, New Kingdom, which saw release in November 2015. It was crafted over eighteen months at various studios in New Orleans, North Carolina, and Wisconsin. Guarisco interpreted the sophomore album as more experimental, lacking traditional pop structures found on early efforts. Marcy Donelson from AllMusic found the LP "ebullient" and "thoughtful," while a reviewer for Rolling Stone (Australia) viewed it as "overstuffed", leaving the listener "aurally exhausted."

In 2018, Glassnote issued the band's latest release, the Movin' On extended play. Movin' On compiles songs the band recorded with producer Dave Cobb—best-known for his work with Sturgill Simpson and Chris Stapleton—at the famed RCA Studio A in Nashville. It was also co-produced by Eric Heigle, and partially tracked at his New Orleans studio space.

== Musical style and influences ==
The sound of Givers has been described as a combination of world music and indie rock. The music of Givers suggest modern exponents of Afro-pop, and their music has been called "island pop".

The group were influenced by Dirty Projectors, as well as Talking Heads. The group has been compared to Vampire Weekend, Neon Indian, and Local Natives. "What negates a good comparison and a bad comparison is not really the artist they mention, it's in the way that their face looks when they say it," said Guarisco.

== Band members ==
Current members

- Tiffany Lamson – vocals, percussion, ukulele (2008–present)
- Taylor Guarisco – vocals, guitar (2008–present)
- Josh LeBlanc – bass guitar, guitar, trumpet (2008–present)

Touring members

- Joe Lyle – drums, samples, percussion (2018–present)
- Jesse Zénon – keyboards/synths (2018–present)

Former members

- William Henderson – keyboards/synthesizers, samples, organ, flutes (2008–2010)
- Kirby Campbell – drums, samples, percussion (2008–2014)
- Nick Stephan – keyboards/synthesizers, saxophone, samples, organ, flutes (2011–2014)
- Ryan Engelberger - keyboards/synths (2016–2017 touring member)
- Martin Diller – drums, samples, percussion (2016–2017 touring member)

== Discography ==
=== Studio albums ===
- In Light (2011)
- New Kingdom (2015)

=== Extended plays ===
- Givers EP (2009)
- Movin On EP (2018)
