= Royal Bangs =

American indie rock band

- Royal Bangs performing at the Brudenell Social Club in Leeds on April 17, 2010

Background information
- Origin: Knoxville, Tennessee, US
- Genres: Indie rock; experimental rock
- Years active: 2005–present
- Label: Audio Eagle Records City Slang Glassnote Music
- Members: Ryan Schaefer; Chris Rusk; Sam Stratton; Dylan Dawkins
- Past members: Joseph Gillenwater; Danny Sale; Jason Campbell; Henry Gibson; Brandon Biondo
- Website: Myspace Page

Royal Bangs are an indie rock group from Knoxville, Tennessee. The band is composed of drummer Chris Rusk, singer and multi-instrumentalist Ryan Schaefer, and guitarist Sam Stratton.

== History ==
While attending high school in 2001, Schaefer and Rusk began performing together and using the moniker Royal Bangs when Stratton joined in 2005. The band recorded We Breed Champions in their basement preceding Schaefer's departure to France and an indefinite hiatus. During the time apart, Patrick Carney of The Black Keys discovered the band on Myspace and signed them. Royal Bangs released their debut LP We Breed Champions in 2008 through Carney's independent Audio Eagle Records.

The following year, German label City Slang released the album in Europe where British music publication Uncut described the record as "one smart and super-confident package, rather like a chirpier, younger, less navel-gazing Radiohead."

Their second LP, Let It Beep, was released in late 2009 by both Audio Eagle Records and City Slang. BBC Music editor Mike Diver reviewed the record, describing it as "varied but never lacking cohesion, Let It Beep is a charming and entirely unforeseen hit for tastes demanding their rock a little rough-hewn and happily unaffected. That it makes KoL (Kings of Leon) sound as sonically redundant as U2 and Oasis is merely an accidental bonus."

The band signed to Glassnote Records in September 2010 and released their third album, Flux Outside, on March 29, 2011.

Royal Bangs played at Bonnaroo in 2008 and in 2010 they played the Bonnaroo and Lollapalooza festivals.

Royal Bangs made their TV network debut on Late Show with David Letterman on April 1, 2011.

In early 2012, Royal Bangs made an addition to their lineup by bringing Dylan Dawkins to play bass guitar.

On June 24, 2013, Rolling Stone premiered the video for "Better Run", a song from the upcoming LP Brass, recorded with Carney in May 2012 and set for a September 17 release.

== Discography ==
=== Albums ===
- We Breed Champions (2008)
- Let It Beep (2009)
- Flux Outside (2011)
- Brass (2013)

=== Singles ===
- Better Run (2013)
