= Taylor Janzen =

Canadian indie rock musician

- Born: June 9, 1999 (age 27); Winnipeg, Manitoba, Canada
- Genres: alternative rock; indie rock; folktronica
- Occupations: Singer; songwriter
- Instruments: Vocals; piano; guitar; ukulele
- Years active: 2017-present
- Label: Glassnote Records
- Website: taylorjanzen.com

Taylor Janzen is a Canadian indie rock musician from Winnipeg, Manitoba. To date, Janzen has released two EPs and one full-length album.

== Early life ==
Janzen is from Winnipeg, Manitoba.

== Career ==
Janzen's first release was an acoustic EP she recorded in her basement in the summer of 2017, titled Fear & Faith. Janzen released her first official EP at the age of 19. The EP, titled Interpersonal, was released in August 2018 and consists of four songs. In 2019, Janzen released her second official EP titled Shouting Matches. The EP was written while Janzen was going through a period of massive anxiety. The EP was recorded with a full band, a first for Janzen. It was recorded in Omaha, Nebraska with Mike Mogis. In July 2021, Janzen released a new song titled Push It Down. She released another new song, Something Better, in October 2021. On March 3, 2023, she released her first full-length album I Live In Patterns.

In August 2023, Janzen announced via her Facebook Page that she is moving to Nashville, Tennessee to pursue bigger opportunities in her music career.
