= JDiggz =

Canadian Rapper/Producer, Director, Entrepreneur

- Also known as: Director Diggz
- Born: Jonathan Poirier; July 17, 1986 (age 39); Toronto, Ontario, Canada
- Origin: Toronto, Ontario, Canada
- Genres: Rap/Dancehall Rap
- Occupations: Producer, Rapper
- Years active: 2002–2015
- Labels: Maxamus (2004–2009) eOne Music (2006–2009)

Jonathan Poirier, better known by his stage name JDiggz, is a Canadian hip hop MC and producer of Guyanese and Acadian French descent. He also co-founded StarBwoyz production Team with Half-Brother Nick Hatch aka Scotch Butta.

== Career ==
In 2004, Diggz signed with independent record label Maxamus Records, that year he released his first single “Hypnotic” which became an underground Toronto anthem. In 2005, Diggz released his hit single “Push It Up”, and was recruited to be a support act for Aftermath/G-Unit recording artist Game for his National Canadian Tour (18 Cities) as a result. In 2007, JDiggz released Memoirs of a Playbwoy, featuring the singles "Push It Up", "Make It Hot", "With You", "Gimme Dat" and "Just Wanna Party". The album, before its release, was titled The Pornstarr LP. In 2011, Diggz collaborated with Neverending White Lights frontman Daniel Victor on the song “This Time”, winning him his first major award for Independent Video Of The Year, at the 2011 Much Music MMVAs.

== Discography ==
=== Studio albums ===
Album information
Memoirs of a Playbwoy
- Released: August 28, 2007
- Label: Koch Entertainment
- CRIA Certification: N/A
- RIAA Certification: N/A
- Singles: "Puush It Up", "Make It Hot", "Gimme Dat"

=== Singles ===
- "Hypnotic"
- "Puush It Up"
- "Make It Hot"
- "Gimme Dat"
- "Just Wanna Party" feat. Voyce
- "With You" feat. George)
- "With You" (Remix) feat. George & Drake)
- "This Time" feat. Neverending White Lights (2010)

=== Other collaborations ===
- "Don't Watch Me" by Trish (feat. JDiggz)
- "Pop" by Melanie Durrant (feat. JDiggz)
- "Ridin'" by Nate Skeeze (feat. JDiggz)
- "34 D'z" by Peezee (feat. JDiggz)
- "The Game (Remix)" by Alyssa Reid (feat. JDiggz)

=== Production credits ===
- "Smirnoff Raw Tea Partay" Commercial (BBH NYC) - Directed by Little x
- "Pop" by Melanie Durrant (Feat. JDiggz)
- "Let Me Remix" by Melanie Durrant (Feat. Kardinal Offishall)
- "Head and Shoulders" by Mr. Biggz AKA T-Trav
- "Ridin'" by Nate Skeeze (Feat. JDiggz)

=== Awards and nominations ===
- Nominated 2006 MMVA for MuchVibe Best Rap Video - Puush It Up
- Nominated 2007 MMVA for Best Cinematography and MuchVibe Best Rap Video - Make It Hot
- Nominated 2008 Juno award for Best Rap Recording - Memoirs Of A Playboy
- Won 2011 MMVA for Independent Video of The Year- This Time
