= Give Me Mine =

Studio album by Jonas Sees in Color
- Released: April 16, 2013
- Recorded: Fidelitorium Recordings; Kernersville, North Carolina
- Genres: Rock, alternative, indie
- Length: 36:15
- Label: Jonas Sees in Color
- Producers: Ted Comerford and Jonas Sees in Color

Jonas Sees in Color chronology
Jonas Sees in Color (2009)	Give Me Mine (2013)

Singles from Give Me Mine
- 1. "Help! Help!" Released: March 31, 2012; 2. "Give Me Mine" Released: April 5, 2013; 3. "Black Coffee" Released: July 3, 2013; 4. "Dirty Little Sunshine" Released: June 4, 2014

Give Me Mine is the second album by American rock band Jonas Sees in Color, released independently on April 16, 2013. Recorded on 2-inch reel-to-reel tape at Fidelitorium Recordings, the album is a departure from the band's previous material of pop rock to a more minimalist hard rock sound. The album was produced by Ted Comerford and mastered by Jamie King. Mixing and "gizmos and gadgets" are credited to Fidelitorium founder Mitch Easter, established musician and producer of artists such as R.E.M. and Ben Folds Five, among others.

Musically, Give Me Mine is similar to 2012's Soul Food with its grungy, garage rock exterior based in early contemporary music styles such as rock and roll and soul. Influenced heavily by various classic rock bands, Jonas Sees in Color blends vintage structure with a modern flare. According to music blog Planet Stereo, this attributes to creating an album that "feels fresh, [but also] has a nostalgic feel to it."

== Track listing ==
No.	Title	Length
1.	"Give Me Mine"	2:52
2.	"Black Coffee"	2:39
3.	"Red Hot Blood"	4:02
4.	"Dirty Little Sunshine"	3:25
5.	"Harvest Pt 1"	3:11
6.	"Harvest Pt 2"	2:55
7.	"Happiness"	3:41
8.	"Underground"	3:19
9.	"Mary"	3:16
10.	"Help Help"	2:20
11.	"Teeth and Gums"	3:38

== Credits ==
Jonas Sees in Color

- Ryan Downing – Vocals, lyrics
- Jonathan Owens – Guitar, backing vocals
- Mikey Deming – Bass, backing vocals
- John Chester – Drums and percussion

Production

- Ted Comerford – Producer
- Bob Engel – Engineer
- Mitch Easter – Mixing
- Jamie King – Mastering
- Danny Fonorow – Manager
- Joey Kirkman – Cover photo
- Ryan Downing – Additional art/design
- Matthew Rudzinski – Additional support
- Jose Norato – Additional support
