= Flux Outside =

Studio album by Royal Bangs
- Released: March 29, 2011
- Recorded: 2010
- Genre: Indie rock, experimental rock
- Length: 50:32
- Label: Glassnote Records
- Producer: Dave Fridmann

Royal Bangs chronology
Let It Beep (2009)	Flux Outside (2011)	Brass (2013)

Professional ratings
Aggregate scores
Source	Rating
Metacritic	71/100
Review scores
Source	Rating
BLARE Magazine	4/5 stars

Flux Outside is the third studio album by rock band Royal Bangs. The album was released on March 29, 2011.

== Track listing ==
No.	Title	Length
1.	"Grass Helmet"	2:40
2.	"Fireball"	4:29
3.	"Back Then It Was Different"	3:41
4.	"Triccs"	3:44
5.	"Bull Elk"	3:14
6.	"Bad News, Strange Luck"	5:37
7.	"Loosely Truthing"	1:56
8.	"Faint Obelisk Two"	3:31
9.	"Silver Steps"	5:38
10.	"TV Tree"	4:28
11.	"Dim Chamber"	4:42
12.	"Slow Cathedral Melt"	6:53
