= Melanie Durrant =

Canadian urban contemporary-style singer

- Born: Toronto, Ontario, Canada
- Genre: Urban contemporary
- Occupation: Singer
- Website: www.melaniedurrant.com

Melanie Durrant (born in Toronto) is a Canadian urban contemporary-style singer.

== Career ==
Durrant attended the Arts program at Earl Haig Secondary School and also trained at the Royal Conservatory of Music. Melanie Durrant has received multiple accolades throughout her career. She was nominated in several categories at the 2004 Canadian Urban Music Awards and at the MuchMusic Video Awards. Melanie Durrant has collaborated with artists such as Kardinal Offishall, Choclair, Common and Slakah The Beatchild. She has shared the stage along with U.S. artists such as Jay-Z, 50 Cent, Jill Scott and Sean Paul.

Durrant has also been involved with numerous educational initiatives, such as headlining the 'HipHop4Africa' Mandela Children's Fund Canada and CapAids February 2006 Toronto benefit which was hosted by George Stroumboulopoulos. Deejay Ra, who interviewed Durrant for the event's DVD, also did a live reading at the sold-out event as part of his 'Hip-Hop Literacy' program, promoting Nelson Mandela and Tupac books to the young students in attendance.

In 2013, Durrant's reggae-influenced lovers rock single, "Made For Love" was nominated for Reggae Single of Year for the 2013 Juno Awards. Then in 2014, "Gone" was Durrant's second release in as many years to be recognized by the Canadian Academy of Recording Arts and Sciences (CARAS) at the JUNO Awards. She then received her third consecutive nomination for "Four Seasons" as a 2015 JUNO Award-nominee for R&B/Soul Recording of the Year. In that same year, Durrant also received a nomination for Soul/R&B Artist or Group of the Year at the SirusXM Indie Awards.

On February 17, 2015, Durrant released her sophomore album entitled "Anticipation". The album was released through her own independent imprint Melo-D's Inc. Anticipation was well received and charted in the No. 5 spot on iTunes Canada for R&B/Soul album.

== Personal life ==
Durrant is of Jamaican, Vincentian, Nova Scotian, Aboriginal, Irish, and Scottish descent.

== Discography ==
- 2005: Where I'm Goin
- 2015: Anticipation

== Singles ==
- "Housework" (2002)
- "Where I'm Goin" feat Common (2003)
- "Let Me" feat Kardinal Offishall (2004)
- "Bang Bang" feat Kardinal Offishall (2005)
- "Pop" feat JDiggz (2005)
- "The Answer" feat Slakah The Beatchild (2009)
- "Lifted" (2010)
- "Loved" (2011)
- "Made For Love" (2012) (nominated for 2013 Juno Reggae Recording of the Year)
- "Gone" (2013) (nominated for 2014 Juno R&B/Soul Recording of the Year)
- "Four Seasons" (2014) (nominated for 2015 Juno R&B/Soul Recording of the Year)

== Singles chart ==
Year	Single	Canadian Singles Chart
2003	Where I'm Goin feat Common	77
2004	Let Me feat Kardinal Offishall	35
2005	Bang Bang feat Kardinal Offishall	19
2005	Pop feat JDiggz	66
