= Jonas Sees in Color =

American rock band

Jonas Sees In Color
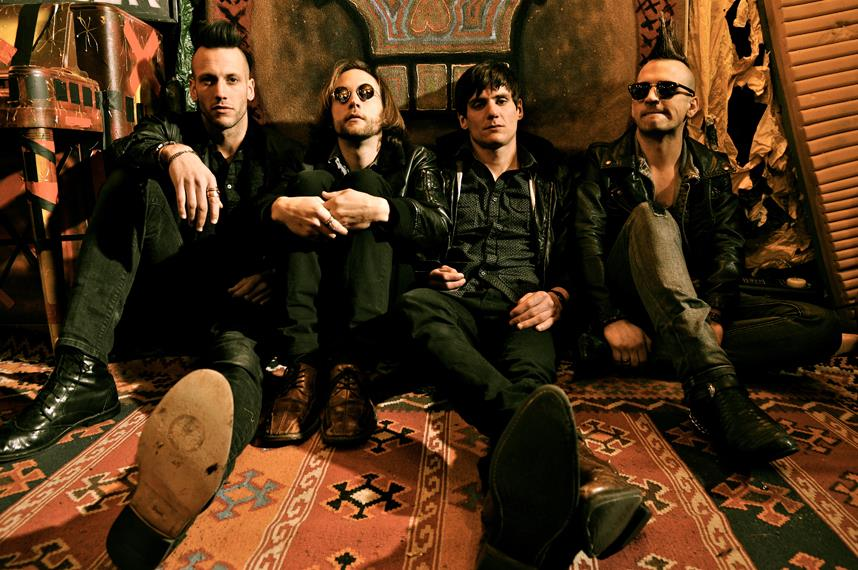
- Jonas Sees In Color

Background information
- Origin: Greensboro, North Carolina, United States
- Genres: Rock, alternative, indie
- Years active: 2005–present
- Label: Unsigned
- Members: John Chester, Ryan Downing, Jonathan Owens, Mikey Deming
- Website: Official Website

Jonas Sees In Color is an American rock band from Greensboro, North Carolina, United States, composed of members John Chester, Ryan Downing, Michael Deming and Jonathan David Owens. The band's most recent album “JSIC” was released August, 31st of 2018.

The band's name is a reference to the book The Giver by Lois Lowry.

== History ==
=== Formation and influences ===
The name "Jonas Sees in Color" is a reference to Lois Lowry's 1993 Newbery Award-winning novel The Giver. Singer Ryan Downing explains: "Our name is basically a metaphor. In The Giver, the main character (Jonas) lives in a black and white world. When he is chosen to take on the responsibility of the hopes, thoughts, and feelings of his entire village, he finally begins to see in color. One of the most important goals of our music is to create a connection with the listener by accurately connecting the stories and ideas contained in our music in a way that allows the listener to take and interpret the songs as their own." Downing, Albright, Deming, and Chester began writing music together in the summer of 2005 and the band's line-up was solidified in 2007 with the addition of Owens and Plummer. They cite The Beatles, The Black Crowes, Band of Horses, Kings of Leon, My Morning Jacket, and Otis Redding as musical influences, as well as literature such as The Giver, The Catcher in the Rye, and works by Japanese modernist Haruki Murakami Frontman Ryan Downing also cites Mick Jagger of the Rolling Stones as inspiration.

=== "Avalanche" EP (2007-2009) ===
The band's rowdy, high-energy live performances attracted the attention of North Carolina indie label Right Hook Records. "Avalanche", the first EP, quickly sold out of the 1,000 copies pressed and attracted the attention of numerous other record labels, among them Daniel Glass and Glassnote Records.

=== Signing to Glassnote and debut (2009) ===
After meeting with the band and experiencing the live show, Daniel Glass signed the band in December 2008. The band entered the studio in Denver, Colorado with platinum producer Aaron Johnson (The Fray) and the album was released on September 29, 2009. The album included several songs from the "Avalanche EP" along with new tracks. The themes range from personal topics such as longing and hope to a narrative about Charles Manson. The sound of the album encompasses rock, indie rock, and pop music.

=== Lineup changes, SOUL FOOD and Give Me Mine ===
After months of spending time working on demos and two members leaving the group, the band went into the studio with Ted Comerford and Mitch Easter in the summer of 2011 to work on the follow-up to their debut album.

To appease fans who had been anxiously awaiting new music, the band recorded, mixed, and mastered the SOUL FOOD EP in a week and quickly released it to fans. The EP features four songs that served as a reintroduction of the band. The EP was released as a pay-what-you-want deal where fans could pay as much, or as little, as they wanted.

Tracked on 2-inch reel-to-reel tape, the band released "Give Me Mine" on April 16, 2013. Featuring the rowdy rockers "Dirty Little Sunshine" and the haunting "Harvest Saga" the album shows continued growth as the band continues stretching themselves to new lengths. As of 2015, the band is in the studio working on their third full-length.

In the fall and winter of 2014, Jonas Sees In Color released a Halloween EP, Ryan Downing and the Howlin' screams Presents: Howl-O-Ween!, and a Christmas song, I Don't Wanna See You on Christmas.

== Band members ==
- John Chester - drums
- Ryan Downing - lead vocals
- Jonathan Owens - guitar, backing vocals
- Mikey Deming - bass

=== Former members ===
- Jonathan Albright - guitar, backing vocals
- Meagan Beth Plummer - keyboard
- David Clark - keyboard - backing vocals

== Discography ==
=== Full Lengths ===
- Jonas Sees in Color (2009)
- Give Me Mine (2013)

== Singles ==
| Date of Release | Song | Album |
|---|---|---|
| April 20, 2010 | Loose Threads | Jonas Sees in Color |
| August 12, 2010 | Stand Tall | Jonas Sees in Color |
