= Sorry (Ider song) =

2016 debut single by Ider

Single by Ider
- Released: 20 April 2016
- Genre: R&B; folktronica
- Label: Self-released
- Songwriters: Elizabeth Somerville; Megan Markwick

Ider singles chronology
"Sorry" (2016)	"Pulse" (2016)

"Sorry" is a song recorded by English singer-songwriter duo Ider. It was self-released on 20 April 2016, and was Ider's debut single.

== Background and composition ==
"Sorry" was Markwick and Somerville's first single as part of their Ider project, which they had started working on when they moved into a flat together in Summer 2015. They had previously been working together since 2012 as an acoustic folk duo called "Lily and Meg".

In an interview they described the song as being about "falling out of love with someone. It goes through the motions; beginning with a bit of doubt and ending with independence."

== Critical reception ==
Hillydilly's Cole Ryan says that "'Sorry' isn't overly complex (there's not much more than some dim piano and some sparse percussion here), but the real appeal is in the way their gentle vocals and honest lyrics combine wonderfully with the instrumental base. This one will perfectly complement a rainy day, but, even on its own, it serves as a strong first outing from the pair and has us excited for all things from them ahead."

== Track listing ==
Digital download

1. "Sorry" – 3:02
