= Nozuka Pass =

Mountain pass in Japan

- 野塚峠
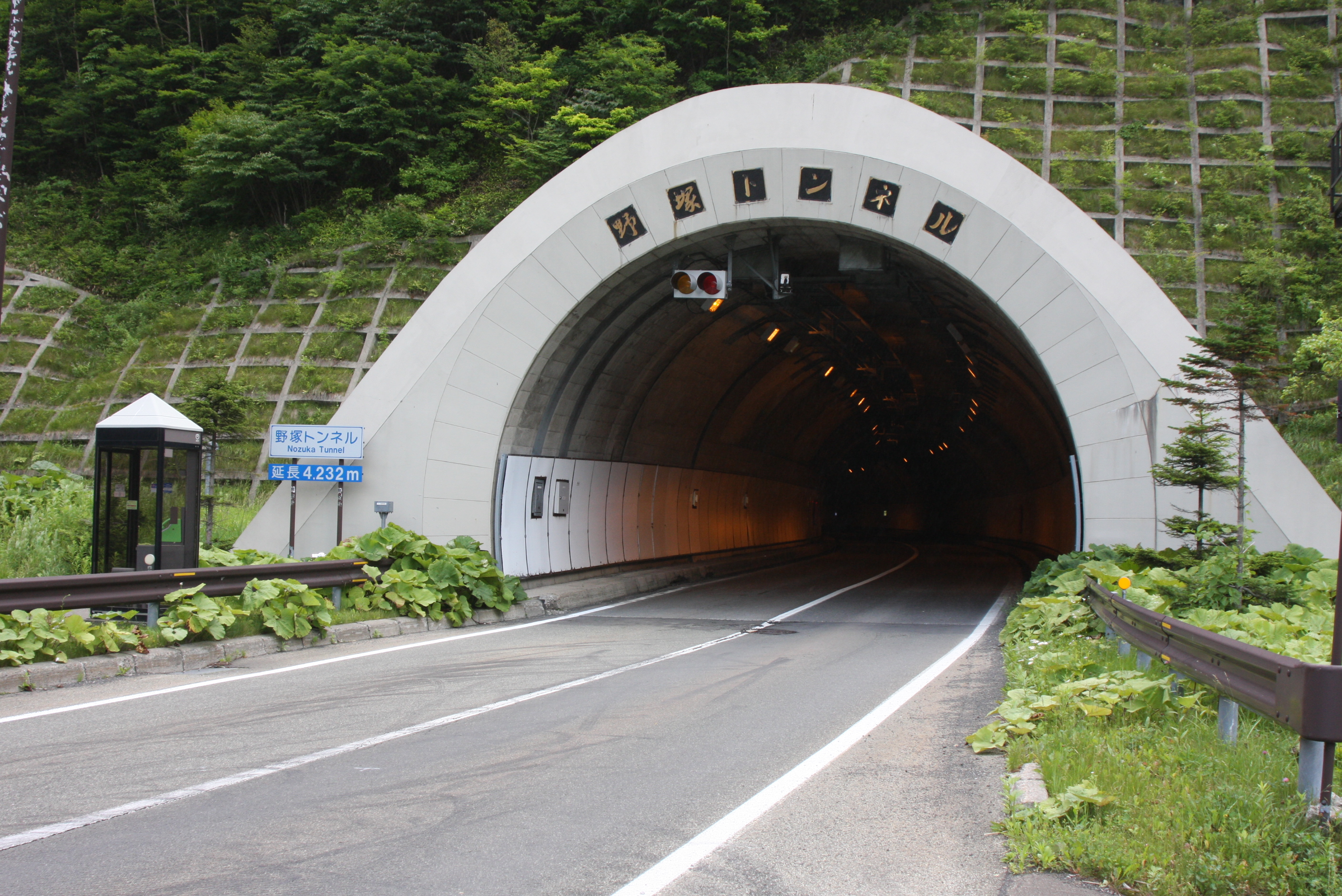
- Interactive map of Nozuka Pass
- Elevation: 585 metres (1,919 ft)
- Traversed by: Japan National Route 236

Third Approach
- Location: Japan
- Range: Hidaka Mountains
- Coordinates: 42°19′49″N 143°2′17″E
- Topo map: Geographical Survey Institute; 25000:1 トヨニ岳; 25000:1 楽古岳; 50000:1 楽古岳; 50000:1 上豊似

Nozuka Pass (野塚峠, Nozuka-totsuge) is a mountain pass in the south-end of the Hidaka Mountains of Hokkaidō, Japan.

== Layout ==
The pass is at 1,230 metres (4,035 ft), but Japan National Route 236 uses the Nozuka Tunnel (野塚トネル, Nozuka-toneru), which passes 645 metres (2,116 ft) below the pass.

The pass is 21.4 kilometres (13.3 mi) long. The road is 5.5 metres (18 ft) wide with a maximum grade of 6%. The minimum curve radius is 70 metres (230 ft). Snow is possible on the pass from October to April. Japan National Route 236 crosses the pass between Hiroo and Urakawa.

== See also ==
- Mount Nozuka
