= In Light =

Studio album by Givers
- Released: June 7, 2011
- Recorded: January 2010; Dockside Studios (Maurice, Louisiana)
- Genre: Indie pop
- Length: 51:00
- Label: Glassnote
- Producers: Kirby Campbell, Korey Richey, Taylor Guarisco

Givers chronology
Givers - EP (2009)	In Light (2011)

In Light is the debut studio album by the American rock band Givers. Recorded at Dockside Studios in Maurice, Louisiana, the album was released on June 7, 2011 through Glassnote Records. Givers was founded in 2008 after a last-minute impromptu jam session at a Lafayette pub. The group, which had roots in zydeco, jazz and Cajun music, continued performing part-time until they opened for Dirty Projectors in 2009, who brought them along for an East Coast tour. Their first extended play, Givers, was released for free online in 2009 and features earlier versions of songs on In Light.

The album was recorded in January 2010 at Dockside Studios in Maurice, Louisiana. The group signed to Glassnote Records in February 2011, who issued In Light in June 2011. The album received largely favorable reviews from music critics.

== Background ==
Givers was formed in 2008 in Lafayette, Louisiana by Tiffany Lamson, Taylor Guarisco, Kirby Campbell, Josh LeBlanc, William Henderson, and Nick Stephan. The band knew one another from high school in Lafayette, where "there's two or three clubs and everybody plays there and supports each other." Guarisco had toured with a zydeco band, while the other future members dabbled in Cajun and jazz music. Lamson grew up with gospel music as her parents were pastors, and she sang in the church band; she instead focused on feeling the music emotionally while the other members studied music. The band's earliest origins date to when Hurricane Katrina hit in August 2005. Lamson had just started her freshman year at the University of New Orleans, where much of the band first met. Guarisco and Lamson were rooming together when the storm hit, leaving them with roughly 15 feet of water in their apartment. With school on hold and nowhere to live, the duo returned home with little to do, and began making music together and performing at open mic nights. While Lafayette was "suitably anonymous" before the disaster, nearly 30,000 people moved to the city following the tragedy, resulting an "explosion in culture."

Givers came together in 2008, when Lamson and Guarisco recruited Kirby Campbell, Will Henderson and Josh LeBlanc for a two-hour slot at a Lafayette pub. Lamson and Guarisco had never sung prior to joining the band, and Josh LeBlanc was a jazz trumpeter before learning the bass. The unnamed band hopped on the last-minute slot after another local band dropped off the bill, and improvised the entire set. They were phoned by the pub and invited back, and they continued to perform improvised sets. "I mean, we weren't a band, we were just making shit up," Guarisco later said. "That was how songs were created, that total free-form state where we just played and recorded and then excerpted and rearranged." The band scoured their iTunes libraries looking for interesting song titles they could narrow down for a band name; Guarisco picked a Lucky Dragons song called "Givers." The band recorded their debut EP in Campbell's bedroom, and released it online for free in 2009. After the newly christened Givers performed at Baton Rouge's stalwart music hall Spanish Moon, booking agent Aaron Scruggs gave the band what would become one the "major accidents that became very fruitful occurrences," according to Guarisco. For their Baton Rouge show, Dirty Projectors had a rare opening slot, and Scruggs gave it to Givers, who had been performing only part-time since their 2008 formation. Dirty Projectors were Guarisco's favorite band and a key inspiration in creating Givers. To prepare for the performance, the band rehearsed eight hours a day for a week. Frontman Dave Longstreth subsequently invited the band along as support for an East Coast tour.

== Recording and production ==
The band recorded their debut album in January 2010 at the "magical, swampy [and] historical" Dockside Studios in Maruice, Louisiana, which had previously hosted acts such as B.B. King, Derek Trucks, Mavis Staples and Dr. John. The group cooped up in guest rooms along the banks of the Vermilion Bayou in Maurice, and spent 20 days recording the album. In contrast to their debut EP, which was recorded in Campbell's bedroom and sporadically recorded with a list of limitations, they viewed Dockside as a virtual utopia in contrast. As they were completely separated from city life — "You can't hear cars, there's no light pollution," said Guarisco — they never found themselves distracted, simply waking up to record until "[we] were dead tired" in the late night. Each song from the band's debut EP was re-recorded and revamped; the band particularly redeveloped "Meantime," in order to "recreate it in a better light."

The band felt the recording process "immaculate," feeling that the studio offered "unlimited possibilities." For production, the band hooked up with Ben Allen, who helmed Animal Collective's pop-crossover breakthrough Merriweather Post Pavilion (2009). Korey Richey co-produced the album alongside Guarisco, and the record was completed by the time the band signed to Glassnote the following February.

== Composition, theme and artwork ==
Guarisco felt the theme of In Light is approaching life through appreciation and love. The album was recorded with no particular concept in mind, and the theme "came after the fact," according to Lamson. After recording, the group " had all this time to just sit on what we had done," and they found the songs happened to come out as an expression of being grateful. "Like I don't care how bad your life is, there's always something around you to be grateful for," said Guarisco in 2011. "Our songs are a testament to that kind of thinking."

The album begins with "Up Up Up," the first song the band improvised together that has roots in their first performance. The melody and lyrics remain largely unchanged from its original form, which was recorded by Lamson on a digital handheld recorder. "Up Up Up" and "Saw You First" utilize Caribbean rhythms, steel drums and "unpredictable" instrumental breaks. "Meantime" features an "explosive afrobeat chorus" that Soundcheck compared to "Cape Cod Kwassa Kwassa" by Vampire Weekend. "Ceilings of Plankton" combines "Annuals-style harmonies with bouncy drums, flutes, and a synth-led coda that recalls electropop acts like Neon Indian." "Saw You First" has been described as "Arcade Fire-sized charge retreating to the band's blissed out grooves," and the first three tracks have been called "childlike bursts of unabashed joy." The music on In Light largely drew comparisons to Vampire Weekend and Talking Heads.

To visualize the album artwork, the group took trips to record stores and photographed album art that they felt captivated and inspired by. The group then collaborated with Rob Carmichael of Seen Studios.

== Reception ==
=== Commercial performance ===
The album received heavy radio rotation in Australia, Canada and the United Kingdom, as well as in New York, Minneapolis and Seattle.

=== Critical reception ===
In Light received largely favorable reviews from music critics. Catherine P. Lewis of The Washington Post described the record as an "instant mood-lifter," writing that "There’s not a lethargic moment here […] the band’s exuberance is barely containable." Stephen Thompson of NPR felt In Light reflected " that knockabout, anything-goes vibe, just in time for the season that suits it best." Devon Maloney of The Phoenix called the record "an impressive step forward — it seriously contends for the title of this summer's go-to indie-pop record." Allmusic's Matt Collar called In Light an "accomplished, ambitious debut," while comparing it to "the peppy pseudo-Afro pop of Vampire Weekend and the percussive, improv-heavy dance rock of Local Natives." Ryan Reed of Paste felt the record rose above its reference points, "because the songs are usually excellent […] speaking strictly sonics, In Light is literally the brightest album I’ve heard in ages." Q felt "This world music/indie rock mix is countered by the affecting melancholy of their quieter moments," while Ari Lipsitz of CMJ opined that Givers were a "seriously cute band that writes seriously catchy love songs that you will probably seriously enjoy — if you're all right with that ebullience thing."

Emily Temple of American Songwriter praised the record as "impossibly optimistic," writing that "The music is charismatic and chaotic, full of shouts, clanging and bright guitars — listen to it with your eyes closed and you’ll see everything short of sparkling blue stars." Alternative Press called the music on In Light "enthralling," summarizing that "Givers have created a debut that will surely set them atop the indie-rock world, if not only for their strict adherence to trying everything possible and succeeding gloriously at it all." Jon Young of Spin recommended that the record is "best absorbed in small portions, allowing you to savor the seriously catchy melodies and uplifting vibes," feeling that the songs blur together when consumed at once. Fraser McAlpine of the BBC Music parsed the record, describing it as "an exhilarating first listen: you just don’t know what’s going to happen next."

However, several reviewers were unimpressed with the often-changing song structure on In Light. While Rebecca Nicholson of The Guardian praised the band's enthusiasm, she felt that "The formula of cramming 30 different songs into one is fun for a while, and it's invigorating, but ultimately it's hard to shake a sense of over-indulgence." Sam Wolfson on NME criticized the often-changing song structure on In Light, writing that "While their love of premeditated spontaneity might be admirable in jazzier quarters, in reality it means that almost every song on their debut is marred by sudden changes in time signature, key and genre." Mojo was similarly mixed, writing that "It's a shame that their modishness acts against them, but sometimes, playing all the right notes in the right order just isn't enough."

== Track listing ==
No.	Title	Length
1.	"Up Up Up"	4:33
2.	"Meantime"	5:02
3.	"Saw You First"	5:07
4.	"Ripe"	5:05
5.	"Noche Nada"	4:47
6.	"Ceiling of Plankton"	4:20
7.	"In My Eyes"	4:47
8.	"Atlantic"	4:54
9.	"Go Out at Night"	7:24
10.	"Words"	5:33

== Personnel ==
Givers

- Tiffany Lamson – vocals, ukulele, percussion, art concept
- Taylor Guarisco – vocals, guitar, bass guitar on "Atlantic", art concept, production
- Kirby Campbell – drums, samples, percussion, art concept
- Josh LeBlanc – bass guitar, lead guitar on "In My Eyes" and "Atlantic", art concept
- William Henderson – keyboards/synthesizers, samples, organ, flutes, art concept

Additional musicians

- Nick Stephan – keyboards/synthesizers and flutes on "Saw You First", "Ceiling of Plankton" and "Atlantic"
- Sam Craft – strings on "Ripe", "Noche Nada" and "Words"
- Jack Craft – strings on "Ripe", "Noche Nada" and "Words"
- "Our Family Members" – claps and love on "Noche Nada"

Production

- Kirby Campbell – production, additional engineer
- Korey Richey - production, engineer
- Eric Heigle - engineer on "Atlantic"
- Tony Daigle - additional engineer
- Ben Allen - mixing engineer
- Chris Coady - mixing engineer on "In My Eyes", "Atlantic", "Go Out All Night" and "Words"
- Greg Calbi - mastering engineer
- Daniel Glass – A&R
- Aaron Scruggs – management

Artwork

- Rob Carmichael – photo illustration and design
- Jason Frank Rothenberg – back cover photo
- Cameron Ground – interior spread photo
- Eliot Brasseaux – band photo
- Kim Dupuis – additional photography
- Anne Blenker – additional art contribution
