= Birds of Wales (rock group) =

Canadian indie folk rock band

- Origin: Toronto, Ontario, Canada
- Genres: Folk rock, indie rock, pop
- Years active: 2005–2011
- Labels: Invisible Hands Music, Sparks Music
- Members: Morgan Cameron Ross; Mike Caputo; Ben Standage; Paul Barry; Daniel Taylor

Birds of Wales was a Canadian indie folk rock band based in Toronto. Its members were Morgan Cameron Ross (vocals, guitar), Ben Standage (drums), Daniel Taylor (bass), Mike Caputo (guitar, banjo), and Paul Barry (percussion).

Birds of Wales toured Europe five times with everyone from Xavier Rudd to Dragonette to The Sadies, had their video for Cinderella on full rotation on MuchMoreMusic, and received extensive radio play across North America and the UK.

In 2006, the band independently released their first EP, Birds of Wales. Its tracks received significant airplay on Canadian commercial and college radio, and have been broadcast across North America on SiriusXM and Sirius Satellite Radio. "My Lady in July" was the most played song on The Verge, Sirius XM's music station, in June 2006.

The band's second EP, Fall of the 49, was released in 2007. They earned the attention of fans in Europe, with five successful European tours over 16 months with bands such as (Thomas Dolby and The Jam). The first single from Fall of the 49, "Cinderella Has Nothing on You", was part of a compilation CD, 560,000 copies of which were distributed throughout Ireland. The video for the song also was on full rotation on MuchMoreMusic in Canada.

Birds of Wales released the full-length album, Belgravia Hotel, on Sparks Music/Emi in Canada on April 13, 2010. The first single off the record was the song, "Uninteresting".

Birds of Wales broke up in 2011. Cameron Ross recorded a solo album, played with the band Bellwoods, and wrote songs for Ryan Cabrera, Bobby Bazini, Sarah Slean, Hawksley Workman, and Ron Sexsmith. Ben Standage joined the band Down I Go.

== Discography ==
- Birds of Wales (2006, EP), Independent
- Fall of the 49 (2007, EP), Invisible Hands Music
- Belgravia Hotel (2010), Sparks Music
