= Philip Nozuka =

Canadian-American actor (born 1987)

- Born: June 5, 1987 (age 39); New York City, New York, U.S
- Citizenship: Canada
- Occupation: Television actor

Philip Nozuka (born June 5, 1987) is an American-born Canadian actor of Japanese descent.

== Life and career ==
Nozuka was born in New York City, New York to a Japanese father, Hiromitsu Nozuka, and a Canadian mother, Holly Sedgwick. He is the brother of singers Justin Nozuka and George Nozuka, and the nephew of actress Kyra Sedgwick and actor Kevin Bacon. He is a graduate of the Etobicoke School of the Arts for Musical Theatre and the National Theatre School of Canada in Montreal where he studied acting.

For film and television Nozuka is best known for his appearances on Degrassi: The Next Generation where he played Chester, and Disney's Aaron Stone where he played Freddie.

Nozuka appeared in David Cronenberg's 2012 film Cosmopolis, and in 2013's Carrie.
