= Mount Nozuka =

Mountain in Hokkaido, Japan

- 野塚岳

Highest point
- Elevation: 1,353.2 m (4,440 ft)
- Listing: List of mountains and hills of Japan by height
- Coordinates: 42°19′45″N 143°2′52″E

Geography
- Location: Hokkaidō, Japan
- Parent range: Hidaka Mountains
- Topo map(s): Geographical Survey Institute (国土地理院, Kokudochiriin) 25000:1 トヨニ岳, 25000:1 楽古岳

Geology
- Mountain type: Fold

Mount Nozuka (野塚岳, Nozuka-dake)

Mt. Nozukadake

is located in the Hidaka Mountains, Hokkaidō, Japan. The Nozuka Tunnel connects Hidaka and Tokachi subprefectures via Route 236 through Mount Nozuka.

== See also ==
- Nozuka Pass
