= Comprehensive layout =

Draft page layout shown to client before production

In graphic design and advertising, a comprehensive layout or comprehensive, usually shortened to comp, is the page layout of a proposed design as initially presented by the designer to a client, showing the relative positions of text and illustrations before the final content of those elements has been decided upon. The comp thus serves as a draft of the final layout, and (if approved) is used as guide for further design changes and, ultimately, production.

Traditionally, the four stages of an illustration or other commercial art creation (e.g., advertisement) are:

- Sketch — the initial idea roughly "sketched out" in order to quickly transfer the idea on to a physical substrate
- Layout — the idea laid out in relative position for further development
- Comp — the idea created in such a way as to closely mimic the final creation, usually as a step toward approval by decision-makers
- Finish — the idea rendered in the appropriate medium for sale, display, or reproduction

For traditional media (such as paint), the division between layout and comp is more clear-cut than for computer-generated art. For traditional media, the distinction between layout and comp is typically one of refinement and presentation. Layouts and comps are often done on different substrates because of this (e.g., tracing paper for a layout vs. calendared bond paper or illustration board for a comp). In this case, a layout done on tracing paper could be laid over other media (e.g., a photo) to see how it would eventually appear after finish render, and to ascertain overall feasibility, and the comp could be done on opaque bond paper or illustration board as a presentation piece for a client's approval.

With computer-generated art, the distinction between layout and comp has become blurred. Since computer-generated art can evolve as one file over time, finely segmented milestones in the development process have less meaning. With computer-generated art, even the sketch stage is often skipped. This has led to a two-stage process; comp and finish. The definitions of each milestone are roughly the same as with traditional media. Even in the age of rapid desktop publishing software, comps may be developed using hand-rendering techniques and materials to avoid investing too much time on the computer before client approval of the idea, depending on the complexity of the production task. If there is any three-dimensionality to the design (for example, the design is of a box or of a two sided piece) a "physical comp" is preferred to a computerized sketch because fundamental physical relationships (for example, position and show-through of die-cuts, or inadvertently designing Möbius strips) can be missed in a two-dimensional sketch. A hand-rendered comp may be useful in helping the client refrain from "nitpicking" the production quality and focus on the design idea.

In the overall creation process there is also a distinction between finish render and final render. Finish rendering refers to the process, and final rendering refers to the schedule. The first finish rendering may not be the final rendering; the first finish rendering could be the first of many renderings, with each subsequent finish rendering needing refinement before the final version is created.

The illustration element may incorporate stock photography, clip art, or other found material that gives an idea of what should be visually communicated, before entering any negotiations concerning the rights to use a specific image for the purpose. Picture agencies may encourage such use free of charge, in the hope that the comp image (sometimes referred to as a "positional" image) will end up being used in the final product. For this reason, it is sometimes mistakenly believed that "comp" is short for "complimentary," as it is in some other promotional contexts.

The word "comp" can also be used as a verb. For example, an artist may "comp something up"; that is, they will create a comp. "Comp" may also stand for "composition" or "composite layout".

== See also ==
- Animatic
- Previsualization
- Communication design
- Website wireframe
