= George Nozuka =

Canadian singer (born 1986)

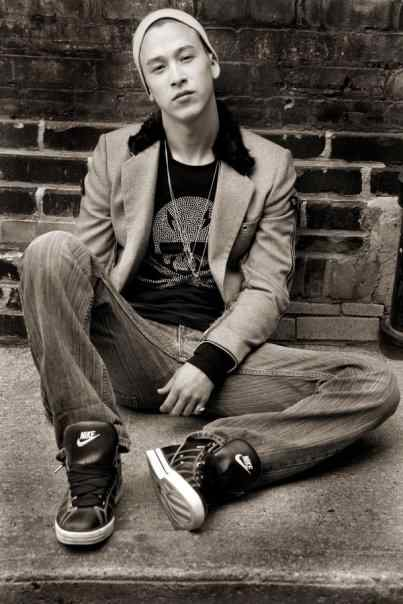
- Nozuka in 2013
- Born: April 28, 1986 (age 40); New York City, U.S.
- Occupations: Singer; songwriter; recording artist
- Relatives: Justin Nozuka (brother); Philip Nozuka (brother); Henry Nozuka (brother)
- Musical career
- Origin: New York City, U. S.
- Genres: R&B; soul
- Instruments: Vocals
- Years active: 2006–present
- Label: Sony ATV

George Nozuka (born April 28, 1986) is an American-born Canadian singer and songwriter. best known for his single "Talk to Me", which peaked at No. 1 on the MuchMusic music-video countdown in October 2006.

== Career ==
Nozuka released his debut album Believe in 2007 under the mononym George. The album was produced by Perry Alexander, Roy "Royalty" Hamilton, and Anthony M. Jones, and was released by HC Entertainment Group. Three tracks became hits: "Talk to Me”, "Lie to Me", and "Last Time". Music videos for the songs were directed by RT! and appeared on the charts of Canada's specialized music cable channel MuchMusic.

Nozuka co-wrote Justin Bieber's “Home This Christmas” with Justin Bieber, Melanie Joy Fontana, Nasri Tony Atweh, and Nicholas Turpin. He also collaborated with Drake, and toured with The Backstreet Boys across Europe and Japan.

== Collaborations ==
=== Forgotten Children ===
Through the Canadian section of Plan, Nozuka was involved in a documentary about restavecs, children working as domestic servants in Haiti. The documentary Forgotten Children: The Story of Haiti's Restavecs, directed by Craig Goodwill, shows the situation of the children through the eyes of various personalities, including Nozuka, a Canadian United Nations peacekeeper, Haitian filmmakers and activists, and former restavecs themselves. Nozuka produced the song "Hurting Child" for the documentary.

=== Songwriting ===
Nozuka co-wrote "Home This Christmas" with Justin Bieber, and "I Love Girls" with Cody Simpson.

== Personal life ==
Nozuka is one of seven children of Canadian mother Holly Sedgwick and Japanese father Hiromitsu Nozuka. Sedgwick raised Nozuka and his six siblings as a single mother. Nozuka is the older brother of the musicians Justin Nozuka and Henry Nozuka, and the actor Philip Nozuka.

Nozuka's aunt, his mother's half-sister, is the actress Kyra Sedgwick, who is married to the actor Kevin Bacon. Their two children, Travis and Sosie Bacon, are Nozuka's first cousins.

== Discography ==
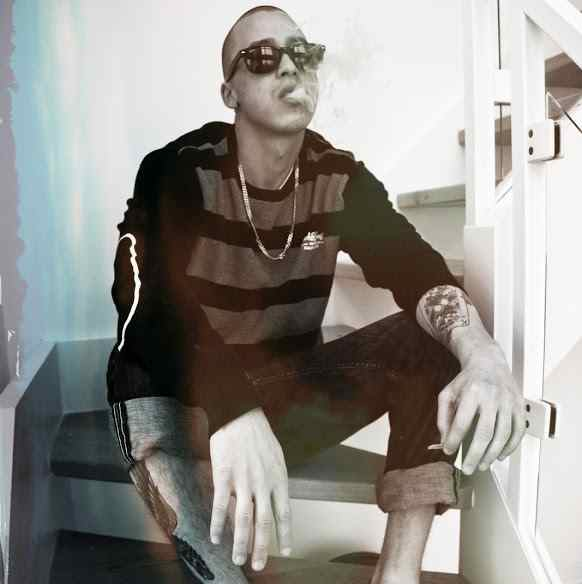
George Nozuka

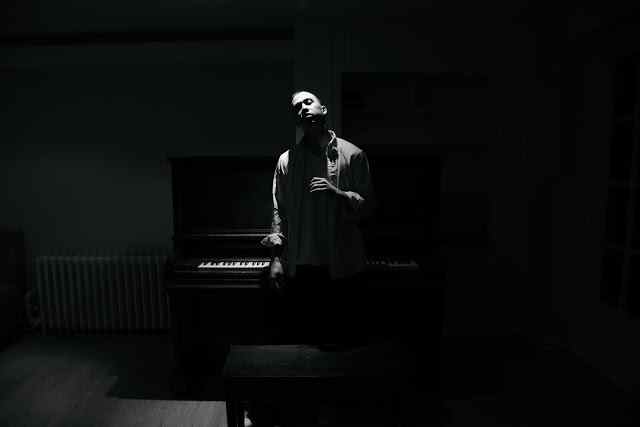
George Nozuka

=== Albums ===
List of albums, with track lists
Title	Album details	Notes
Believe	Released: 2007; Label: HC Entertainment Group	Track list: 1. "Talk to Me" (remix); 2. "Dance with Me"; 3. "I Wanna Love You"; 4. "Somethin' Somethin'"; 5. "Talk to Me"; 6. "Last Time"; 7. "Such a Fool"; 8. "Lie to Me"; 9. "Cherie Amour"; 10. "Can't Stop Loving You"; 11. "Stay Up"; 12. "Butterfly"; 13. "Hurting Child"; 14. "I Wanna Love You" (remix)
Beautiful	Released: January 7, 2013; Label: Self-released	Track list: 1. "Beautiful" (ft. Jackie Boyz); 2. "Runaway"; 3. "Up to You"; 4. "Invasion"; 5. "Haunted" (ft. Riff Raph); 6. "Don't Go"; 7. "Unexplainable"; 8. "Two Broken Hearts"; 9. "I'm Ill"; 10. "You Are the Reason"; 11. "It's Love That's All"; 12. "Do You Remember"; 13. "Back to Life"; 14. "Boom Boom Boom"; 15. "End All Be All"
Alone	Released: June 5, 2013; Label: Self-released	Track list: 1. "Alone" (ft. Jhyve); 2. "I'm Reaching Out"; 3. "Win Your Love Again"; 4. "Pay Attention"; 5. "Touch It" (ft. Jhyve); 6. "Valentina"; 7. "I'm Jealous"; 8. "Plastic Doll"; 9. "I am Broken"; 10. "What You Didn't Say"; 11. "Heaven"; 12. "I'm iLL"; 13. "Two Broken Hearts"; 14. "Back to Life"
Dream On	Released: June 1, 2014; Label: Self-released	Track list: 1. "No One Else"; 2. "Forever Love"; 3. "You and Me"; 4. "ShoomDeeDop"; 5. "Barbie"; 6. "Getaway"; 7. "You Deserve Better"; 8. "Dream On"; 9. "Heaven Above"; 10. "That Someone"

=== Mixtapes ===
- 2012: Love Me
- 2016: Purple Kush

=== Compilations ===
- 2015: You Deserve Better
- 2021: Till the Morning

=== EPs ===
- 2018: Getaway

=== Singles ===
- 2006: "Talk to Me"
- 2007: "Lie to Me"
- 2007: "Last Time"
- 2012: "Don't Go"
- 2013: "I'm Reaching Out"
- 2014: "You Deserve Better"
- 2017: "My Beating Heart"
- 2018: "Getaway"
- 2018: "Touch Yourself"
- 2020: "What You Got"
- 2020: "Love You Like"
- 2021: "Blankets Of Gold"

=== As featured artist ===
- "With You" (remix) - JDiggz and Drake

== Awards ==
- In 2007, the music video for "Lie to Me" won RT! the Best Director award at the Much Music Video Awards for the second consecutive year.
