= Aesop (record label) =

- Founded: 2012
- Founder: Adam Royal
- Country of origin: United Kingdom
- Location: London
- Official website: aesoplabel.com

Aesop Label, commonly known as Aesop, is a British independent record label founded and based in Brixton, London. The label was launched in 2012 with a focus on releasing records available on limited runs of 12-inch vinyl as well as being available digitally.

== History ==
Aesop was started by Adam Royal, its inaugural release was 'The Wheel from English musician Sohn, which was also marked his debut release and who later went on to release his debut album with 4AD, the album reached number 31 on the UK Albums Chart. Primarily Aesop has worked with artists making music within the electronic-pop genre, with other releases of note coming from British musician TĀLĀ and her ‘The Duchess’ and ‘Alchemy’ EPs. As of 2015 TĀLĀ has now signed to major label Columbia Records. Aesop released the debut EP from Wayward who later went on to sign with UK label, Black Butter Records. In 2014 Aesop released the debut EP from UK duo Sylas entitled ’Shore’, which also featured production and vocals from Brian Eno. In July 2015 Aesop released the debut single from Dutch duo Klyne. Label founder Adam Royal contributed to the HUH. Magazine 'Label Picks' series about how the Sylas release came about.

Aesop was featured as "Label of the Week" in the 16 April 2014 issue of NME. At the end of 2014 Noisey named Aesop one of their record labels of the year in their article "These Are the British Record Labels That Killed It in 2014".

== Artists ==
- Sohn
- TĀLĀ

== Discography ==
Artist	Title	Type	Release date	Cat. No.
Klyne	Paralyzed	Digital	7 August 2014	ASP-008
Sylas	Shore featuring Jelani Blackman and Brian Eno	12" EP / Digital	24 November 2014	ASP-006
TĀLĀ	Alchemy	12" EP / Digital	17 November 2014	ASP-005
TĀLĀ	The Duchess	12" EP / Digital	2 June 2014	ASP-004
Wayward	Love Jones	12" Single / Digital	2 December 2013	ASP-003
Gent Mason	Eden	12" EP / Digital	7 October 2013	ASP-002
Sohn	The Wheel	12" EP / Digital	5 November 2012	ASP-001

== Art direction ==
The Aesop logo was designed by British artist David Bray, known for his intricate illustrative style. The logo adorns the A-side centre label of the 12-inch vinyl versions of Aesop releases. A subtle line spanning across the width of the centre label behind the logo is either positioned at 33 or 45 degrees from the top most point of the logo, this dictates at which speed the record should be played at, either 33 or 45 RPM.
