= Glassnote Records =

American record label

- Founded: 2007
- Founder: Daniel Glass
- Distributor: The Orchard
- Genre: Indie rock; alternative rock; synthpop; alternative hip hop; indietronica; indie folk
- Country of origin: United States; United Kingdom
- Location: New York, NY (U.S.); London, England (U.K.)
- Official website: www.glassnotemusic.com

Glassnote Records (also known as Glassnote Entertainment Group LLC) is a record label that was launched by American music executive Daniel Glass in 2007. The label primarily has a lineup of indie rock and alternative rock artists, most notably Mumford & Sons and Phoenix. The label has also released music from popular artists in other genres, such as Silvana Estrada, Chvrches, Childish Gambino and Secondhand Serenade.

== History ==
In 2009, the label released French indie rock band Phoenix's fourth album, Wolfgang Amadeus Phoenix, which was awarded the Grammy Award for Best Alternative Music Album in 2010. Phoenix went on to release Bankrupt! which won the 2014 Victoires de la Musique Rock Album of the Year. The band also released Ti Amo in 2017 and Alpha Zulu in 2022.

In February 2011, Mumford & Sons' Sigh No More became the label's highest charting album, peaking at #2. That same month, Mumford & Sons' single "The Cave" became the label's second Top 40 chart placement on the Billboard Hot 100, peaking at #27 (the first being "Fall for You" by Secondhand Serenade in 2008). The September 2012 release of the band's second album, Babel, gave the label its first ever #1 album on the Billboard 200 and the label's first album to win the Grammy Award for Album of the Year. Mumford & Sons' most recent album, Prizefighter, is due out February 20, 2026. The lead single, Rubber Band Man with Hozier, broke a post-pandemic record for most consecutive weeks number one at Triple A, topping the chart for eleven weeks (as of February 2, 2026).

Childish Gambino, the music project of actor and comedian Donald Glover, signed with Glassnote Records in September 2011. Shortly after on November 15, 2011, the label released its first hip hop album, Camp. On December 10, 2013, the label released his second studio album Because the Internet. On December 2, 2016, the label released his third studio album, Awaken, My Love!. The album received critical acclaim including being one of Clashs album of the year and became certified Platinum on September 27, 2018.

On February 13, 2014, it was revealed that Glassnote had signed a global distribution agreement with Universal Music Group, excluding Australia/New Zealand (Liberator), and South Africa (Just Music). The label was previously distributed by RED Distribution in the US.

In 2020, Silvana Estrada became the first Latin American artist to sign with Glassnote Records. In 2022, she released her first solo album, Marchita, which received critical acclaim. Estrada won the 2022 Latin Grammy Award for Best New Artist with Angela Alvarez at the 23rd Annual Latin Grammy Awards Her 2025 album Vendrán Suaves Lluvias earned praise from NPR, Pitchfork, Rolling Stone, and more, with appearances on NPR Tiny Desk, Jimmy Kimmel Live!, and A COLORS Show by ColorsxStudios. The lead single Como Un Pájaro earned a Latin Grammy nomination for Best Singer-Songwriter Song.

In 2022, the label signed a new distribution agreement with The Orchard, the label services division of Sony Music Entertainment.

== Awards ==
In the April 28, 2011, issue of Rolling Stone, Glassnote was named Best Indie Label.

Two albums released by the label have been certified platinum by the Recording Industry Association of America for sales of at least one million units: Sigh No More and Babel, both by Mumford & Sons. Sigh No More, which has been certified triple-platinum for sales of three million copies, is the label's highest selling record.

Four other albums have been certified gold for sales of 500,000 units: Wolfgang Amadeus Phoenix by Phoenix, Wilder Mind by Mumford & Sons and Because the Internet and "Awaken, My Love!", both by Childish Gambino.

The label also won a GRAMMY Award for their release of His Holiness, The Dalai Lama's album Meditations: The Reflections Of His Holiness The Dalai Lama. The album won in the Best Audiobook, Narration & Storytelling category at the 68th Annual Grammy Awards.

== Current artists ==
- Albin Lee Meldau
- AURORA
- Baio
- bby
- Daughter
- Dylan Cartlidge
- Flight Facilities
- Givers
- Grouplove
- Hamilton Leithauser
- Hayes Warner
- Holychild
- Jade Bird
- Mumford & Sons
- Phoenix
- Ripe
- Taylor Janzen
- Silvana Estrada
- The Strumbellas
- The Temper Trap
- The Teskey Brothers
- Tors
- Two Door Cinema Club

== Former artists ==
- CHVRCHES
- Childish Gambino
- Flo Morrissey
- Agung Gede
- Foy Vance
- Hamilton Leithauser + Rostam
- Half Moon Run
- Ider
- I Hate Kate
- James Hersey
- Jeremy Messersmith
- Jonas Sees in Color
- Júníus Meyvant
- Justin Nozuka
- Kele
- Little Green Cars
- Little Quirks
- Madisen Ward and the Mama Bear
- Mansionair
- Oberhofer
- Panama Wedding
- Robert DeLong
- Royal Bangs
- Secondhand Serenade
- Son Lux
- Tor Miller
- William Prince

== Catalog ==
- Secondhand Serenade – Awake (February 6, 2007)
- Secondhand Serenade – A Twist in My Story (February 19, 2008)
- Justin Nozuka – Holly (April 15, 2008)
- I Hate Kate – Embrace the Curse (June 24, 2008)
- Phoenix – Wolfgang Amadeus Phoenix (May 26, 2009)
- Jonas Sees in Color – Jonas Sees in Color (September 29, 2009)
- Mumford & Sons – Sigh No More (October 6, 2009)
- The Temper Trap – Conditions (October 13, 2009)
- Justin Nozuka – You I Wind Land and Sea (April 13, 2010)
- Two Door Cinema Club – Tourist History (April 27, 2010)
- Kele – The Boxer (June 21, 2010)
- Secondhand Serenade – Hear Me Now (August 3, 2010)
- Royal Bangs – Flux Outside (March 29, 2011)
- Givers – In Light (June 7, 2011)
- Childish Gambino – Camp (November 15, 2011)
- Oberhofer – Time Capsules II (March 2012)
- Half Moon Run – Dark Eyes (March 27, 2012)
- The Temper Trap – The Temper Trap (May 18, 2012)
- Two Door Cinema Club – Beacon (September 4, 2012)
- Mumford & Sons – Babel (September 21, 2012)
- Robert DeLong – Global Concepts EP (October 30, 2012)
- Robert DeLong – Just Movement (February 5, 2013)
- Chvrches – Recover EP (March 25, 2013)
- Little Green Cars – Absolute Zero (March 26, 2013)
- Phoenix – Bankrupt! (April 22, 2013)
- Brian Tyler and various artists – Now You See Me Original Motion Picture Soundtrack (May 28, 2013)
- Foy Vance – Joy Of Nothing (August 26, 2013)
- Chvrches – The Bones of What You Believe (September 20, 2013)
- Childish Gambino – Because the Internet (December 10, 2013)
- Panama Wedding – Parallel Play EP (June 3, 2014)
- Childish Gambino – Kauai (October 3, 2014)
- Flight Facilities – Down to Earth (October 24, 2014)
- Robert DeLong – Long Way Down EP (November 10, 2014)
- Tor Miller – Headlights EP (February 2, 2015)
- Mumford & Sons – Wilder Mind (May 4, 2015)
- Holychild – The Shape of Brat Pop to Come (June 2, 2015)
- Madisen Ward and the Mama Bear – Skeleton Crew (June 14, 2015)
- Robert DeLong – In The Cards (September 18, 2015)
- Baio – The Names (September 18, 2015)
- Chvrches – Every Open Eye (September 25, 2015)
- Daughter – Not to Disappear (January 15, 2016)
- Little Green Cars – Ephemera (March 11, 2016)
- AURORA – All My Demons Greeting Me as a Friend (March 11, 2016)
- The Strumbellas – Hope (April 22, 2016)
- Hamilton Leithauser + Rostam – I Had a Dream That You Were Mine (September 23, 2016)
- Tor Miller – American English (September 30, 2016)
- Two Door Cinema Club – Gameshow (October 14, 2016)
- Childish Gambino – "Awaken, My Love!" (December 2, 2016)
- Flo Morrissey and Matthew E. White – Gentlewoman, Ruby Man (January 13, 2017)
- Secondhand Serenade – Awake: Remixed & Remastered, 10 Years & 10,000 Tears Later (February 10, 2017)
- Phoenix – Ti Amo (June 9, 2017)
- Jade Bird – Something American (July 7, 2017)
- Chvrches – Love is Dead (May 25, 2018)
- AURORA – Infections of a Different Kind (Step I) (September 28, 2018)
- Mumford & Sons – Delta (November 16, 2018)
- HUNTAR – The Ride (December 7, 2018)
- Ider – Emotional Education (July 19, 2019)
- Hamilton Leithauser – The Loves of Your Life (April 10, 2020)
- Hamilton Leithauser – Live! at Café Carlyle (September 4, 2020)
- Baio – Dead Hand Control (January 29, 2021)
- Jade Bird – Different Kinds of Light (August 13, 2021)
- Chvrches – Screen Violence (August 27, 2021)
- Silvana Estrada – Marchita (January 21, 2022)
- Two Door Cinema Club – Keep On Smiling (September 2, 2022)
- Phoenix – Alpha Zulu (November 4, 2022)

== See also ==
- List of record labels
