= Aurora's 2018–2019 tour =

2018–19 concert tour by Aurora

2018-2019 Tour
- Tour by Aurora
- Poster for the 2018 European leg
- Location: Asia; Australia; Europe; Latin America; North America
- Associated albums: Infections of a Different Kind (Step 1); A Different Kind of Human (Step 2)
- Start date: 10 October 2018
- End date: 20 December 2019
- No. of shows: 68 in Europe; 17 in North America; 10 in Australia; 8 in Latin America; 6 in Asia; 109 in total
- Supporting acts: Askjell; Fil Bo Riva; Iris Caltwait; Kang Ye-seo; Lauren Jean; Natalie McCool; Put Your Hands Up for Neo-Tokyo; Rhys Lewis; Silja Sol; Talos; Tones and I

Aurora concert chronology
- All My Demons Tour (2016–17); 2018-2019 tour; The Gods We Can Touch Tour (2022–23)

In 2018, Norwegian singer and songwriter Aurora staged her second concert tour. Beginning on 10 October 2018 in Manchester, England, and ending on 20 December 2019 in Osøyro, Norway, the tour supported her second and third studio albums Infections of a Different Kind (Step 1) (2018) and A Different Kind of Human (Step 2) (2019), and consisted of concerts in Australia, Asia, Europe, Latin America and North America.

== Background ==
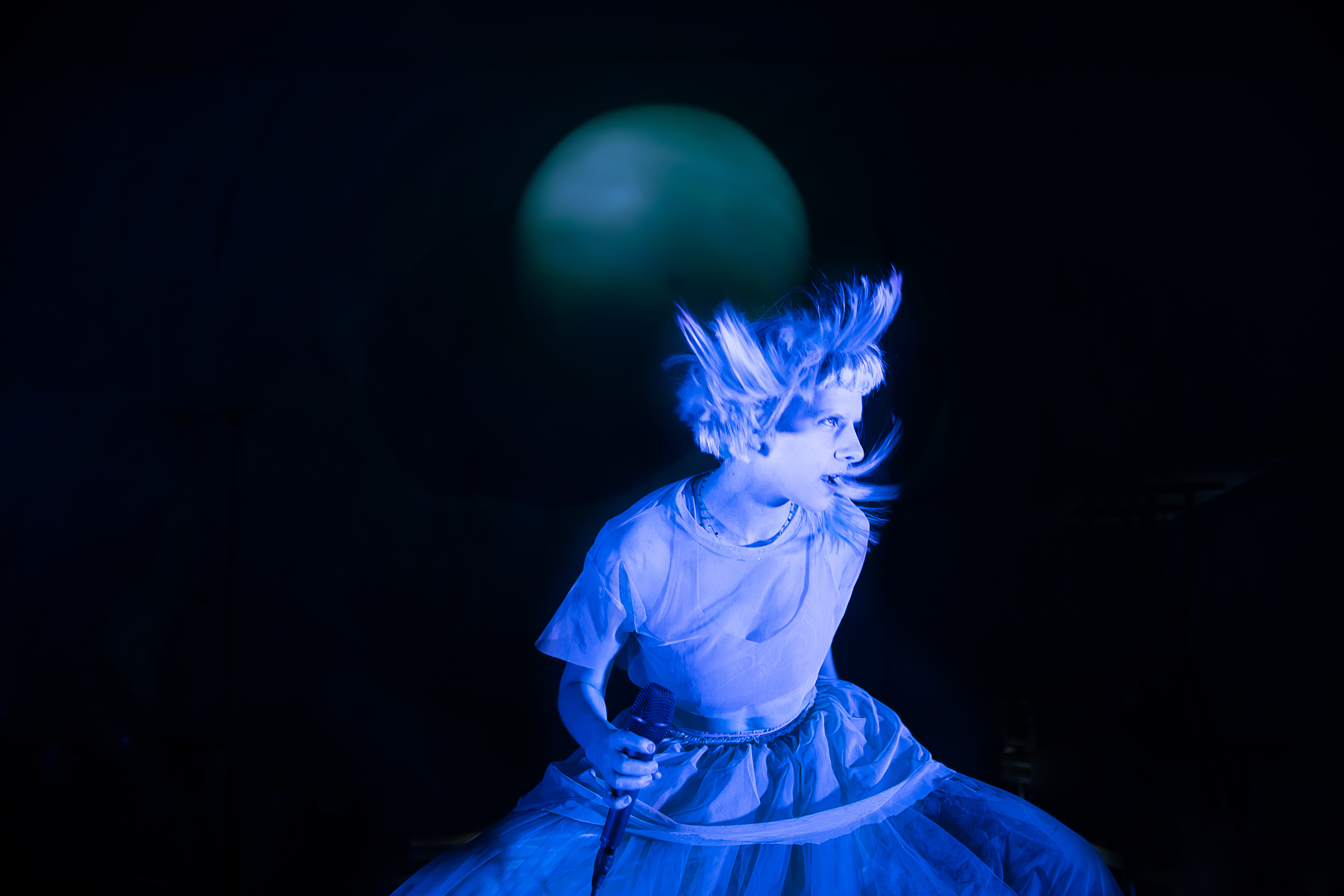
Aurora performing in Molde, Norway, December 2019

The tour was announced on 10 April 2018, with European dates being released at the same time. Its Norwegian dates were announced on 29 Match 2019, and the UK and Asian legs were later announced on May 3 and October 15, 2019, respectively.

== Set list ==
=== February to May 2019 ===
This set list is representative of the show on 18 May 2019, in São Paulo. It is not representative of all concerts for the duration of the tour.

1. "Soft Universe"
2. "Churchyard"
3. "All is Soft Inside"
4. "Home"
5. "Under the Water"
6. "Warrior"
7. "Murder Song (5, 4, 3, 2, 1)" (Acoustic)
8. "Runaway"
9. "In Bottles"
10. "The Seed"
11. "It Happened Quiet" (Acoustic)
12. "Animal"
13. "I Went Too Far"
14. "The River"
15. "Forgotten Love"
16. "Running with the Wolves"

Encore

1. "Infections of a Different Kind" (With extended outro)
2. "Queendom"

=== June to December 2019 ===
This set list is representative of the show on 23 October 2019, in Oslo. It is not representative of all concerts for the duration of the tour.

1. "Churchyard"
2. "All is Soft Inside"
3. "Warrior"
4. "Apple Tree"
5. "Forgotten Love"
6. "Murder Song (5, 4, 3, 2, 1)" (Acoustic)
7. "It Happened Quiet" (Acoustic)
8. "Runaway"
9. "Animal"
10. "In Bottles"
11. "A Different Kind of Human"
12. "The River"
13. "Queendom"
14. "The Seed"
15. "I Went Too Far" (Extended)
16. "Running with the Wolves"
17. "Daydreamer"

== Tour dates ==
List of concerts, showing date, city, country and venue
Date	City	Country	Venue
Europe
10 October 2018	Manchester	England	Academy 2
11 October 2018	London	England	O2 Forum Kentish Town
17 October 2018	Utrecht	Netherlands	TivoliVredenburg
19 October 2018	Cologne	Germany	E-Werk
20 October 2018	Antwerp	Belgium	Trix
21 October 2018	Hamburg	Germany	Docks
23 October 2018	Berlin	Germany	Huxleys
24 October 2018	Munich	Germany	Muffathalle
25 October 2018	Luxembourg City	Luxembourg	Den Atelier
30 October 2018	Paris	France	La Cigale
17 November 2018 (Note: The concert on 17 November 2018 in Istanbul is a part of MIX Festival.)	Istanbul	Turkey	Zorlu PSM
12 January 2019	Roma	Italy	Auditorium Parco della Musica
13 January 2019	Bologna	Italy	Locomotiv Club
14 January 2019	Milan	Italy	Magnolia
15 January 2019	Lausanne	Switzerland	Les Docks
17 January 2019	Prague	Czech Republic	Forum Karlín
18 January 2019	Warsaw	Poland	Palladium
19 January 2019	Copenhagen	Denmark	Store Vega
North America
13 February 2019	Vancouver	Canada	Commodore Ballroom
14 February 2019	Seattle	United States	The Showbox
15 February 2019	Portland	United States	Wonder Ballroom
17 February 2019	San Francisco	United States	The Regency Ballroom
20 February 2019	Los Angeles	United States	The Fonda Theatre
22 February 2019	San Diego	United States	The Observatory North Park
23 February 2019	Phoenix	United States	Crescent Ballroom
25 February 2019	Minneapolis	United States	First Avenue
1 March 2019	Chicago	United States	Metro
2 March 2019	Toronto	Canada	Danforth Music Hall
3 March 2019	Montreal	Canada	Corona Theatre
5 March 2019	Boston	United States	Royale
7 March 2019	New York	United States	Brooklyn Steel
9 March 2019	Philadelphia	United States	Union Transfer
10 March 2019	Washington	United States	Lincoln Theatre
Europe
22 March 2019	Oslo	Norway	Sentrum Scene
23 March 2019	Oslo	Norway	Sentrum Scene
28 March 2019	Bergen	Norway	USF Verftet
29 March 2019	Bergen	Norway	USF Verftet
13 April 2019 (Note: The concert on 13 April 2019 in Vossavangen is a part of Vossajazz Festival.)	Vossavangen	Norway	Park Hotel Vossevangen
Australia
26 April 2019 (Note: The concerts on April 26, 27 28, May 4, 5 and 11, 2019 were part of the Groovin' the Moo.)	Adelaide	Australia	Adelaide Showground
27 April 2019	Maitland	Australia	Maitland Arena
28 April 2019	Canberra	Australia	Exhibition Park
30 April 2019	Sydney	Australia	Enmore Theatre
3 May 2019	Melbourne	Australia	Forum Theatre
4 May 2019	Bendigo	Australia	Prince of Wales Showground
5 May 2019	Townsville	Australia	Murray Sports Complex
6 May 2019	Brisbane	Australia	The Triffid
8 May 2019	Fremantle	Australia	Metropolis
11 May 2019	Bunbury	Australia	Hay International Park
Latin America
16 May 2019	Belo Horizonte	Brazil	Mister Rock
17 May 2019	Rio de Janeiro	Brazil	Circo Voador
18 May 2019	São Paulo	Brazil	Credicard Hall
22 May 2019	Curitiba	Brazil	Ópera de Arame
23 May 2019	Porto Alegre	Brazil	Bar Opinião
25 May 2019	Buenos Aires	Argentina	Teatro Opera
26 May 2019	Santiago	Chile	Cúpula Multiespacio
28 May 2019	Mexico City	Mexico	El Plaza Condesa
Europe
22 June 2019 (Note: The concert on 22 June 2019 in Fredrikstad is a part of Idyll Festival.)	Fredrikstad	Norway	Isegran
28 June 2019 (Note: The concert on 28 June 2019 in Pilton is a part of Glastonbury Festival.)	Pilton	England	Worthy Farm
29 June 2019 (Note: The concert on 29 June 2019 in Werchter is a part of Rock Werchter.)	Werchter	Belgium	Festivalpark
3 July 2019 (Note: The concert on 3 July 2019 in Barcelona is a part of Cruïlla Festival.)	Barcelona	Spain	Parc del Fòrum
4 July 2019 (Note: The concert on 4 July 2019 in Roskilde is a part of Roskilde Festival.)	Roskilde	Denmark	Dyrskuepladsen
6 July 2019 (Note: The concert on 6 July 2019 in Saint Petersburg is a part of Tinkoff Stereoleto Festival.)	Saint Petersburg	Russia	Sevkabel Port
7 July 2019 (Note: The concert on 7 July 2019 in Beuningen is a part of DTRH Festival.)	Beuningen	Netherlands	Groene Heuvels
12 July 2019 (Note: The concert on 12 July 2019 in Tysnes is a part of Tysnesfest.)	Tysnes	Norway	Tysnesfest
17 July 2019 (Note: The concert on 17 July 2019 in Roma is a part of Romma Summer Fest.)	Roma	Italy	Auditorium Parco della Musica
19 July 2019 (Note: The concert on 19 July 2019 in Eidsbugarden is a part of Vinjerock Festival.)	Eidsbugarden	Norway	Vinjerock
20 July 2019 (Note: The concert on 20 July 2019 in Suffolk is a part of Latitude Festival.)	Suffolk	England	Henham Park
North America
9 August 2019 (Note: The concert on 9 August 2019 in San Francisco is a part of Outside Lands.)	San Francisco	United States	Golden Gate Park
10 August 2019	San Francisco	United States	The Independent
Europe
16 August 2019 (Note: The concert on 16 August 2019 in Kraków is a part of Kraków Live Festival.)	Kraków	Poland	Lotnisko - Muzeum Lotnictwa
18 August 2019 (Note: The concert on 18 August 2019 in Hamburg is a part of MS Dockville Festival.)	Hamburg	Germany	Elbinsel
21 August 2019	Sogndalsfjøra	Norway	Studenthuset Meieriet
22 August 2019	Volda	Norway	Studenthuset Rokken
23 August 2019 (Note: The concert on 23 August 2019 in Tønsberg is a part of Sommer i Tønsberg.)	Tønsberg	Norway	Foynhagen
24 August 2019 (Note: The concert on 24 August 2019 in Asker is a part of Hvalstrandfestivalen.)	Asker	Norway	Hvalstrand Bad
11 September 2019	Halden	Norway	Brygga Kultursal
12 September 2019	Tromsø	Norway	Studentsamfunnet Driv
13 September 2019	Trondheim	Norway	Studentersamfundet i Trondhjem
14 September 2019	Trondheim	Norway	Studentersamfundet i Trondhjem
4 October 2019	Haugesund	Norway	Scandic Maritim Hall
5 October 2019	Grimstad	Norway	BlueBox
6 October 2019	Moss	Norway	Verket Scene
16 October 2019	Skien	Norway	Parkbiografen
17 October 2019	Gjøvik	Norway	Gjøvik Olympiske Fjellhallen
18 October 2019	Kristiansand	Norway	Caledonien Hall
19 October 2019	Hamar	Norway	Festiviteten Bar & Scene
23 October 2019	Oslo	Norway	Sentrum Scene
24 October 2019	Bodø	Norway	Sinus
25 October 2019	Narvik	Norway	Narvik Kulturhus
26 October 2019	Mo i Rana	Norway	Scandic Meyergården
2 November 2019 (Note: The concert on 2 November 2019 in Paris is a part of Pitchfork Music Festival.)	Paris	France	Grande Halle de la Villette
4 November 2019	Bristol	England	O2 Academy
5 November 2019	Manchester	England	Albert Hall
6 November 2019	Dublin	Ireland	Olympia Theatre
8 November 2019	Glasgow	England	SWG3
9 November 2019	Newcastle	England	Boiler Shop
10 November 2019	Birmingham	England	O2 Institute
11 November 2019	London	England	Roundhouse
Asia
14 November 2019	Tel Aviv	Israel	Barby
15 November 2019	Tel Aviv	Israel	Barby
24 November 2019 (Note: The concert on 24 November 2019 in Singapore is a part of Neon Lights Festival.)	Singapore		Fort Canning Park
26 November 2019	Tokyo	Japan	Space Odd
27 November 2019	Tokyo	Japan	Duo Music Exchange
30 November 2019	Seoul	South Korea	Nodeul Live House
Europe
12 December 2019	Ålesund	Norway	Terminalen Byscene
13 December 2019	Molde	Norway	Bjørnsonhuset Klubb
14 December 2019	Stavanger	Norway	Stavanger Konserthus
15 December 2019	Drammen	Norway	Union Scene
20 December 2019	Osøyro	Norway	Oseana Art and Cultural Centre

=== Cancelled shows ===
List of cancelled concerts, showing date, city, country, venue and reason for cancellation
Date	City	Country	Venue	Reason
23 November 2019 (Note: The concert on 23 November 2019 in Hong Kong would be part of Clockenflap Festival.)	Hong Kong		Central Harbourfront Event Space	Cancelled due to the 2019–20 Hong Kong protests
