= All My Demons Tour =

2016–17 concert tour by Aurora

- Tour by Aurora
- North America promotional poster
- Location: Australia; Brazil; Europe; North America
- Associated album: All My Demons Greeting Me as a Friend
- Start date: 1 February 2016
- End date: 22 October 2017
- Legs: 8
- No. of shows: 170

Aurora concert chronology
- ...; All My Demons Tour (2016–2017); 2018–2019 tour

The All My Demons Tour was the first concert tour and world tour by Norwegian singer-songwriter Aurora, in support of her debut studio album All My Demons Greeting Me as a Friend (2016). The tour visited cities in Europe, North America, Australia and Brazil. The run of shows began on 1 February 2016 at the Deaf Institute in Manchester, and concluded on 22 October 2017 at the Sacadura 154 in Rio de Janeiro.

== Background ==
The tour included dates in various countries including: Brazil, Australia, the United Kingdom, Germany, the United States and her native Norway. With more than two hundred public appearances around 2016, Aurora suffered from constant health problems (including loss of voice) and in December of that year her cecum was emergency removed in a hospital, which prevented her from fulfilling her last three concerts in the United States. She said in 2019 that her success that year meant a difficult time in her personal life, having to deal with panic attacks and accepting that making music had become a job that involved "share" herself with the world. However, this led her to conclude that she must get better herself before she could help others.

== Set list ==
This set list is representative of the show on 3 November 2016, in New York. It is not representative of all concerts for the duration of the tour.

1. "Lucky"
2. "Winter Bird"
3. "In Boxes"
4. "Little Boy in the Grass"
5. "Under Stars"
6. "Murder Song (5, 4, 3, 2, 1)" (Acoustic)
7. "Through the Eyes of a Child"
8. "Runaway"
9. "Under the Water"
10. "I Went Too Far"
11. "Running with the Wolves"
12. "Conqueror"

Encore

13. "Warrior"
14. "Life on Mars" (David Bowie cover)

== Tour dates ==
List of concerts, showing date, city, country and venue
Date	City	Country	Venue
Europe
1 February 2016	Manchester	England	The Deaf Institute
2 February 2016	London	England	Union Chapel
4 February 2016	Utrecht	Netherlands	TivoliVredenburg
5 February 2016	Dortmund	Germany	Konzerthaus Dortmund
13 February 2016	Trondheim	Norway	Studentersamfundet
15 February 2016 (Note: The concert on 15 February 2016 in Lillehammer is a part of Sjoggfest.)	Lillehammer	Norway	Bruket
Oceania
25 January 2017	Sydney	Australia	Metro Theatre
31 January 2017	Melbourne	Australia	Recital Hall
South America
16 October 2017	Salvador	Brazil	Sesc Casa do Comércio
18 October 2017	Curitiba	Brazil	Bwayne
20 October 2017	São Paulo	Brazil	Tropical Butantã
21 October 2017	São Paulo	Brazil	Tropical Butantã
12 October 2017	Rio de Janeiro	Brazil	Sacadura 154
