= Running with Wolves =

Running with Wolves or Running with the Wolves may refer to:

- "Running with Wolves", a song by Zebrahead from their 2015 album Walk the Plank
- Running with the Wolves, 2015 EP by Norwegian singer Aurora
  - "Running with the Wolves" (song), the title track of the same EP
- "Running with the Wolves", from the soundtrack of the 2020 film Eurovision Song Contest: The Story of Fire Saga
