= Runaway (Aurora song) =

Song by Aurora

Single by Aurora

from the EP Running with the Wolves and the album All My Demons Greeting Me as a Friend
- B-side: "Runaway (Lvl. 2)"
- Released: 7 February 2015
- Recorded: 2013 (demo); 2014 (final)
- Studio: Lydriket (Bergen)
- Genre: Folktronica; synth-pop; electronic; electropop
- Length: 4:13 (album version); 3:25 (radio edit)
- Label: Decca; Glassnote
- Songwriters: Aurora Aksnes; Magnus Skylstad
- Producers: Odd Martin Skålnes; Magnus Skylstad

Aurora singles chronology
"Under Stars" (2014)	"Runaway" (2015)	"Running with the Wolves" (2015)

Music video
- "Runaway" on YouTube

"Runaway" is a song by Norwegian singer-songwriter Aurora, included in her debut extended play (EP) Running with the Wolves (2015) and debut album All My Demons Greeting Me as a Friend (2016). It was released on 7 February 2015 by Decca and Glassnote Records as the lead single of both projects. The song was written by Aurora with Magnus Skylstad and produced by the latter with Odd Martin Skålnes. Musically, "Runaway" is a downtempo folktronica, synth-pop, electronic, and electropop song with influences from Nordic-folk music. Its lyrics, which were inspired by the grief the singer experienced when being far from her family, express escaping reality and realising the need to return home.

"Runaway" was lauded by music critics, who praised its musical style and lyrical content. In spring 2021, the song went viral on the video-sharing platform TikTok, resulting in new chart successes and streams on various platforms. "Runaway" became Aurora's most successful single in her native Norway, charting at number 14. Although the song did not enter the US Billboard Hot 100, it peaked at number one on the US Bubbling Under Hot 100 chart for two weeks. The song also charted in various countries, including the United Kingdom, Australia, Norway, Germany, and Ireland.

"Runaway" was certified platinum in Norway by the International Federation of the Phonographic Industry (IFPI) and in the United Kingdom by the British Phonographic Industry (BPI) and gold in the United States by the Recording Industry Association of America (RIAA). An accompanying music video for the song was directed by Kenny McCracken and was released on 27 February 2015. It shows Aurora walking through various landscapes of Bergen while singing the song. Aurora included "Runaway" on the setlist of her All My Demons Tour (2016). The song was later added to her first compilation EP For the Humans Who Take Long Walks in the Forest (2021).

== Background and development ==
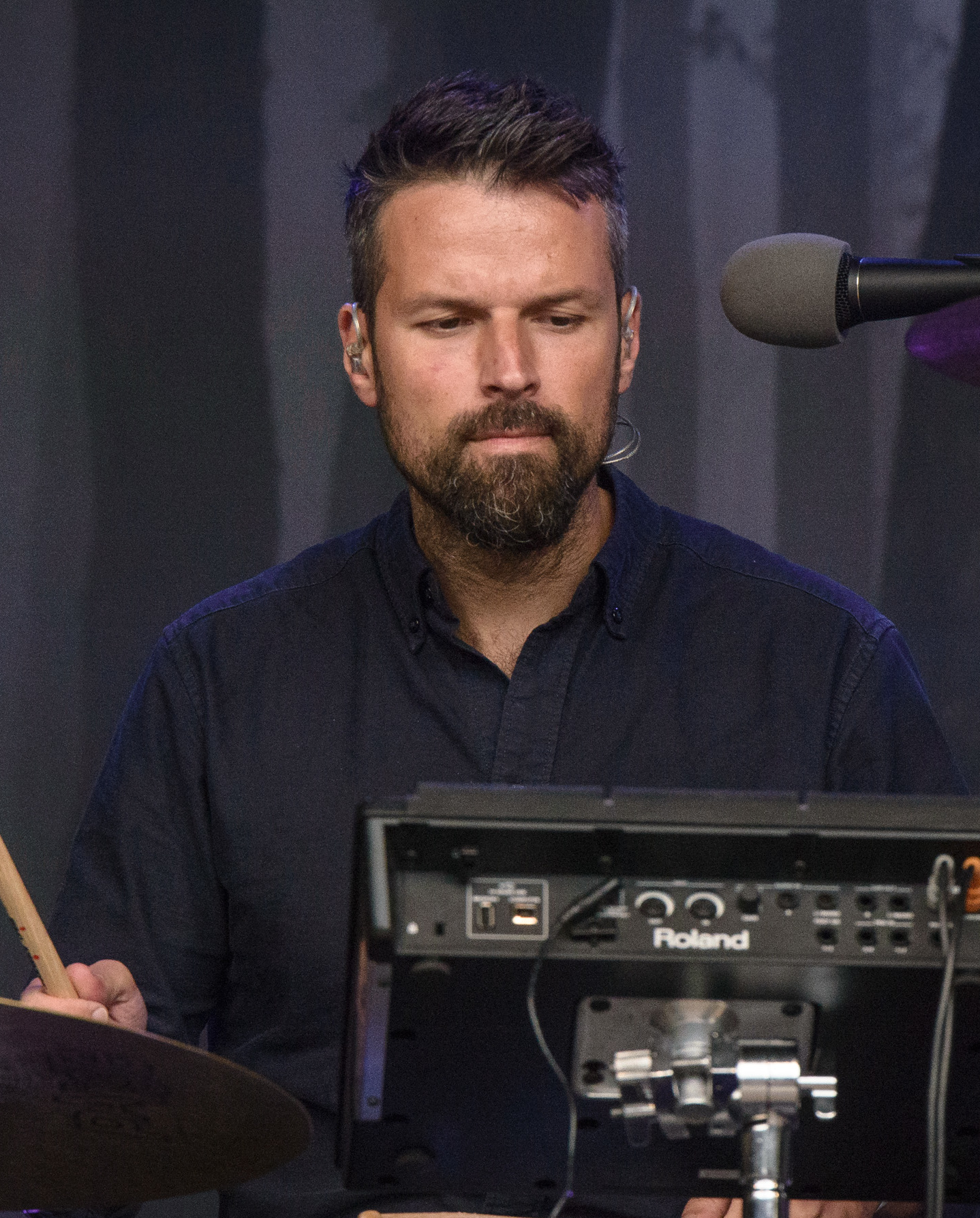
"Runaway" was Aurora's first collaboration with Magnus Skylstad (pictured), who would later take a significant role in her career.

Aurora began playing piano at age six, and she wrote most of the songs of her debut album, including "Runaway", at a young age. According to her, she wrote the song when she was 11 or 12 years old (Note: Some sources state that Aurora wrote "Runaway" when she was 11 years old, while others indicate that she was age 12 at the time she wrote the song. Aurora clarified in an interview that she wrote "Runaway" when she was 11 or 12 years old.) and created the melody on a piano she had at her home, which took approximately an hour. "Runaway" was originally composed for a school assignment when Aurora was in ninth grade. However, she preferred to keep her music private at the time she wrote the song.

When a live performance at Aurora's high school's leaving ceremony and a recording of her song "Puppet" were uploaded online, she was quickly discovered by a representative of the Norwegian management agency of Artists Made Management. Even though she initially denied the proposal, she accepted it since her mother advised her that "maybe there's someone out there who desperately needs [her music]." Aurora was eventually paired with Norwegian musicians and producers Magnus Skylstad and Odd Martin Skålnes, who were responsible for the production of her debut album. Skylstad would also take a significant role in the singer's career, producing the majority of her music.

Before recording the song, Aurora played "Runaway" to Skylstad, the latter shares writing credits with the singer. Skylstad recorded and produced the song's demo, which was uploaded to By:larm's website in late 2013 alongside another song titled "We Were Going to Do That". This early version of the song included piano, strings, bass, beat, and a different bridge, which the singer said it was omitted from the final version because she struggled singing that part live. In 2014, Aurora signed a recording contract with Petroleum Records in Norway, Glassnote Records in North America, and Decca Records in the rest of the world. "Runaway" was eventually re-recorded on winter 2014 at Lydriket Studio in Bergen. Skylstad and Skålnes recorded, produced, and mixed the song, while mastering was made by Alex Wharton.

== Composition and lyrical interpretation ==
"Runaway" is a downtempo folktronica, synth-pop, electronic, and electropop song with influences from Nordic-folk music. A "tenderly catchy" tune, its sparse production contains "echoing water droplet effects, creeping screeches, and windswept transitions." Sheet music for "Runaway" sets the key of A minor with a moderately slow tempo of 58 beats per minute. Aurora's vocals span a range between the notes of A_{3} and E_{5}. Her vocals were compared to those of Emilie Nicolas, Florence Welch, and Joni Mitchell. Aurora said she wanted to place "Runaway" as the opening track of All My Demons Greeting Me As a Friend because she felt the song "puts people in the right mood and mind for the rest of it."

Lyrically, the song is about escapism and "realising you want to get home again." Aurora expanded that "home" for her refers to "where my parents are," which was something she reflected while touring. In an interview with The 405 she said: "It's strange how this song fits my life better now that I could ever imagine when I wrote the song itself. It's about how important it is to have a soft place to fall". According to Aurora, the lyrics "came out of nowhere" and that they became meaningful to her after she grew up. The singer has stated that "Runaway" is one of the few songs from her debut album to "be about [her]." The verses cover various topics like "climbing trees, painting pictures, and dancing in the rain." At the chorus of the song she begs "Take me home, home where I belong."

== Release and reception ==
"Runaway" was first originally released through Aurora's SoundCloud on 9 February 2015. On 16 February 2015, the song was released for digital download and streaming as the lead single on Aurora's debut EP Running with the Wolves. Additionally, promotional CDs were issued in the United Kingdom. The single was later re-released for her debut album All My Demons Greeting Me as a Friend (2016). Aurora also released two acoustic versions of the song: a guitar acoustic version on 5 March and a piano acoustic version on 11 March. An edited version titled "Runaway (Lvl. 2)" was released on 7 May 2021. Glassnote Records issued a 12-inch vinyl single on 11 November 2022, which contained the original version of the song and the "Lvl. 2" edit.

"Runaway" was well received by most music critics. Robin Murray of Clash called the song "a graceful return" and lauded the singer's mature songwriting. Miranda Feneberger from Paste wrote that the track "channels a soft power". Alexandra Pollard for Gigwise noted in her review of All My Demons Greeting Me As A Friend that "there's an eeriness lurking beneath the beauty of ['Runaway']," adding that "its cavernous clicks and echoes make themselves at home before it bursts into something warmer." She also labeled its lyrics as "unsettling." A writer for Rolling Stone called the song a "viral lullaby." DIY's Sean Murray said that "Runaway" tackled more mature themes, regarding the song to be about "a former love."

Will Hodgkinson of The Times characterised "Runaway" to be "about feeling lost that has a poetic wisdom belying her 19 years." He praised how Aurora "uses her clear and unadorned tones to good effect" in the song. Marcy Donelson of AllMusic was less favourable towards "Runaway", she pointed out that the song "turn[s] out to be the average of what the substantial LP offers rather than [a standout]." The song received praise from American singer-songwriter Katy Perry, tweeting that the song "makes my [heart] a flutter". Australian singer-songwriter Troye Sivan also commented about the song, saying it is "100% my fave [sic] song at the minute." Aurora was awarded a NOPA grant of kr 30,000 for this song in 2014.

In January 2025, "Runaway" surpassed one billion streams on Spotify. The following month, Aurora released an orchestral version of the track alongside a 30-minute documentary celebrating its tenth anniversary.

== Commercial breakthrough ==
Upon its release, "Runaway" was streamed over a million times in six weeks on the streaming platform Spotify. The song did not impact any record charts until it gained attention in 2021 with a trend on the video-sharing platform TikTok. The trend consisted of posing while using a filter that repeatedly changed to a "starry sky" background. Aurora herself later posted a video on TikTok using the filter. "Runaway" became Aurora's most successful single in her native Norway, charting at number 14. The song did not enter the US Billboard Hot 100, though it peaked at number one on the US Bubbling Under Hot 100 chart, spending 2 weeks in that position. As of January 2025, the song has achieved more than one billion streams on Spotify.

Due to the popularity of "Runaway" in streaming services and its six-year anniversary in 2021, Aurora released a series of compilation EPs that contained her released songs at the time. The song was eventually included on the compilation EP For the Humans Who Take Long Walks in the Forest, released on 4 February. The same day, Aurora posted a YouTube video clip subtitled "Tik Tok Fan Edition", which included several clips that were published to TikTok.

== Music video ==
=== Background and release ===
A music video for "Runaway" was directed by Kenny McCracken, who would later be the director for three other singles of All My Demons Greeting Me as a Friend ("Conqueror", "Half the World Away", and "Murder Song (5, 4, 3, 2, 1)"). The video was filmed in early 2015 in various landscapes of Bergen near Aurora's hometown and took three days to film it. About filming the video, Aurora told in an interview with NME: "It was extremely cold... I didn't have a lot of clothes. We were stood in the middle of the snow for a lot of hours. I was sick for a lot of time after, which I always am after a video because I insist to have them outside in the cold." The clip was released on 26 February 2015. When asked by Norwegian newspaper Dagbladet about the release, Aurora stated that the video was actually intended to be a promotional recording so "people should get an impression of me as an artist."

=== Synopsis and reception ===
In the music video for "Runaway", Aurora appears wearing a parka and a wool jumper as the video progresses. In one scene she is seen sleeping on the ground. Clash's Robin Murray wrote that the clip "neatly counterpoints the gentle fragility in Aurora's own music." American singer-songwriter Billie Eilish credits the video of this song as one of the reasons she began working on music. In response, Aurora said that "'Runaway' has served the purpose music should serve." The music video is Aurora's most successful music video as a solo artist, and as of June 2025 it has accumulated more than 700 million views.

== Live performances and usage in media ==
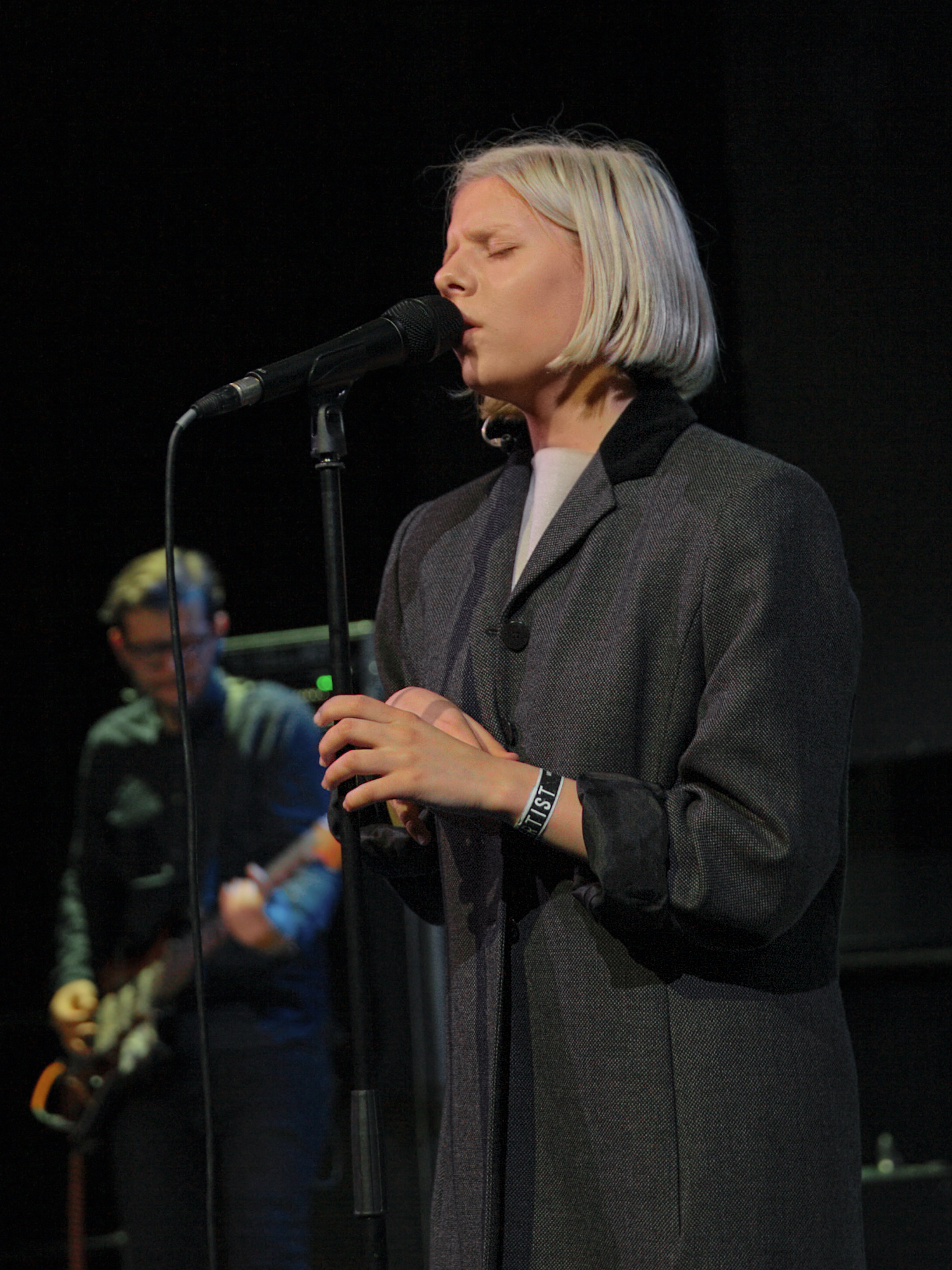
Aurora performing in 2015 at the Way Back When Festival.

Aurora has promoted "Runaway" through a number of live performances. She first sang the early version of the song on 20 February 2014 among some of her songs at the Nabovarsel Minifestival in Bergen, which the singer described as her first "real" performance with a band. She also performed the song at the 2014 festivals of by:Larm and Øyafestivalen. These performances depicted the demo version of the song rather than the final one.

Aurora first performed the released version of the song on 2 July 2015 during the talk show Lindmo. On 9 November 2015, she performed the song in an acoustic session at NPR Tiny Desk. "Runaway" was also one of the songs Aurora performed at the 2015 Nobel Peace Prize Concert. She performed the song along with others from her debut album in a concert promoted by Honda Stage at the Bowery Ballroom to promote All My Demons Greeting Me as a Friend. The song was added to the setlist of a 2016 world tour in support of All My Demons Greeting Me as a Friend.

"Runaway" was used at the finale of the third season of the Fox American television psychological thriller series The Following. Norwegian singer and rapper Cezinando covered the song for NRK P3 on 21 April 2015. The song was included in the setlist of a collaborative virtual concert for the video game Sky: Children of the Light, which premiered on 8 December 2022.

== Track listings and formats ==
- Digital download / streaming
1. "Runaway" – 4:13
- Promotional CD single
1. "Runaway" – 4:10
- Digital download / streaming – Guitar Acoustic
1. "Runaway (Guitar Acoustic)" – 4:19
- Digital download / streaming – Piano Acoustic
1. "Runaway (Piano Acoustic)" – 4:48
- Digital download / streaming – Runaway (Lvl. 2)
1. "Runaway (Lvl. 2)" – 3:33
- 12-inch single – Runaway
1. "Runaway" – 4:08
2. "Runaway (Lvl. 2)" – 3:33
- 7-inch single – Runaway
1. "Runaway" – 4:08
2. "Runaway (Piano Version)" – 3:33

== Credits and personnel ==
Credits adapted from the liner notes of All My Demons Greeting Me as a Friend.

=== Recording and management ===
- Recorded and mixed at Lydriket Studio (Bergen, Norway)
- Mastered at Abbey Road Studios (London)
- Published by Ultra Music Publishing Europe SG

=== Personnel ===
- Aurora Aksnes – vocals, songwriting, piano, synthesizer
- Odd Martin Skålnes – synthesizer, recording, production, mixing
- Magnus Åserud Skylstad – songwriting, synthesizer, drums, percussion, recording, production, mixing
- Alex Wharton – mastering

== Charts ==
=== Weekly charts ===
Weekly chart performance for "Runaway"
Chart (2021)	Peak position
Australia (ARIA)	30
Austria (Ö3 Austria Top 40)	27
Belgium (Ultratip Bubbling Under Flanders)	2
Canada Hot 100 (Billboard)	39
Czech Republic Singles Digital (ČNS IFPI)	14
France (SNEP)	44
Germany (GfK)	30
Greece (IFPI)	19
Global 200 (Billboard)	22
Hungary (Single Top 40)	30
Hungary (Stream Top 40)	24
India International Singles (IMI)	13
Ireland (IRMA)	21
Italy (FIMI)	80
Lithuania (AGATA)	19
Netherlands (Single Top 100)	53
Norway (VG-lista)	14
Portugal (AFP)	27
Slovakia (Singles Digitál Top 100)	19
Sweden (Sverigetopplistan)	51
Switzerland (Schweizer Hitparade)	21
UK Singles (Official Charts)	25
US Bubbling Under Hot 100 (Billboard)	1
US Hot Rock & Alternative Songs (Billboard)	10
US Rock & Alternative Airplay (Billboard)	39
US Rolling Stone Top 100	72

=== Year-end charts ===
Year-end chart performance for "Runaway"
Chart (2021)	Position
Portugal (AFP)	171
US Hot Rock & Alternative Songs (Billboard)	29

== Certifications ==
Certifications for "Runaway"
Region	Certification	Certified units/sales
Brazil (Pro-Música Brasil)	Diamond	250,000^{‡}
Canada (Music Canada)	Platinum	80,000^{‡}
Denmark (IFPI Danmark)	Gold	45,000^{‡}
Germany (BVMI)	Gold	200,000^{‡}
India (IMI)	14× Platinum	1,680,000
Italy (FIMI)	Gold	35,000^{‡}
New Zealand (RMNZ)	2× Platinum	60,000^{‡}
Norway (IFPI Norway)	Platinum	60,000^{‡}
Poland (ZPAV)	2× Platinum	100,000^{‡}
Portugal (AFP)	Gold	10,000^{‡}
Spain (Promusicae)	Gold	30,000^{‡}
United Kingdom (BPI)	Platinum	600,000^{‡}
United States (RIAA)	Platinum	1,000,000^{‡}
Streaming
Worldwide	—	3,000,000,000
^{‡} Sales+streaming figures based on certification alone.

== Release history ==
Release dates and formats for "Runaway"
Region	Date	Format(s)	Version	Label(s)	Ref.
Various	16 February 2015	Digital download; streaming	Original	Decca; Glassnote; Petroleum	
Various	5 March 2021	Digital download; streaming	Guitar Acoustic (Note: "Runaway" (Guitar Acoustic) is the title used in Glassnote and Petroleum editions of the release. Decca editions are titled "Runaway" (Guitar Version) instead.)	Decca; Glassnote; Petroleum	
Various	11 March 2021	Digital download; streaming	Piano Acoustic (Note: "Runaway" (Piano Acoustic) is the title used in Glassnote and Petroleum editions of the release. Decca editions are titled "Runaway" (Piano Version) instead.)	Decca; Glassnote; Petroleum	
Various	7 May 2021	Digital download; streaming	Lvl. 2	Decca; Glassnote; Petroleum	
Various	11 November 2022	12-inch vinyl	Original/Lvl. 2	Glassnote	
Various	7 March 2025	7-inch vinyl	Original; piano	Decca	
