= Animal (Aurora song) =

2019 single by Aurora

Single by Aurora

from the album A Different Kind of Human (Step 2)
- Released: 24 January 2019
- Genre: Electropop; dark pop
- Length: 3:35
- Label: Decca; Glassnote
- Songwriters: Aurora Aksnes; Toby Gad; David Dahlquis
- Producers: Aurora; Magnus Skylstad; Askjell Solstrand; Kill Dave; MyRiot; Toby Gad

Aurora singles chronology
"Forgotten Love" (2018)	"Animal" (2019)	"The Seed" (2019)

Music video
- "Animal" on YouTube

"Animal" is a song by Norwegian singer-songwriter Aurora for her third studio album, A Different Kind of Human (Step 2) (2019). It was released on 24 January 2019, through Decca and Glassnote, as the lead single from the album. "Animal" is an upbeat electropop and dark pop song, produced by Tim Bran and Roy Kerr (My Riot), Magnus Skylstad, and Aurora.

Lyrically, it explores human nature and desire. Andrew Trendell of NME described the song as an arena anthem driven by instinct. The music video, directed by Tim Mattia, reflects Aurora's unique artistic vision. She performed the song on Skavlan on 22 March 2019.

== Background ==
On the same day of the release of her second studio album Infections of a Different Kind (Step 1) (2018), Aurora confirmed in an interview with NME that its follow-up Step 2 would be released either in 2019 or 2020. Initially an 11-track album, it was split into two separate releases; the second part, Aurora's third studio album A Different Kind of Human (Step 2) (2019), uses scrapped songs from Infections of a Different Kind (Step 1). Aurora teased the song "Animal" during 2018 live performances and was thought to be included for her second studio album, however it was released as the lead single of A Different Kind of Human (Step 2) on 24 January 2019. Aurora wrote the song during a trip to Los Angeles; she noted that one of the writers came late to the session but he suggested a lyric change before the song was finished. The single's artwork is a painting made by Aurora.

"Animal" was produced by Tim Bran and Roy Kerr (My Riot), Magnus Skylstad, and Aurora herself. Musically, it was described as an upbeat electropop and dark pop song that transitions into an alternative pop chorus. With a "crystal-clear" vocal performance from Aurora, the song is driven by dynamic, urging dance-floor synthesizers and brooding percussive beats. Lyrically, "Animal" explores human nature and desire, depicting people as "animals hunting for animals." Aurora described it as a reflection on humanity's constant pursuit of love, success, power, and material pleasures, calling it both "grotesque and beautiful."

== Critical reception ==
Andrew Trendell of NME defined "Animal" as an arena anthem "that asks the listener to lose themselves to instinct".

== Music video ==
The song was accompanied by a music video directed by Tim Mattia, who praised Aurora's unique artistic vision and described the collaboration as a highly immersive and creative experience. The video sees the singer escaping a cage in a city and exploring the "concrete jungle".

== Live performances ==
Aurora included "Animal" during a performance at KEXP on 14 February 2019. On 1 March 2019, she performed the song at the Current. Aurora sang the song at the Norwegian-Swedish talk show Skavlan on 22 March 2019.

== Charts ==
Chart performance for "Animal"
Chart (2019)	Peak position
Norwegian Artist Singles (IFPI Norge)	21
