= Forgotten Love =

Forgotten Love may refer to:

- "Forgotten Love (song)", by Aurora, 2018
- Forgotten Love (film), a 2023 Polish drama film
