= Winter Bird =

Winter Bird may refer to:

- "Winter Bird (song)", by Aurora, 2016
- "Winter Bird", a song on the Paul McCartney album McCartney III
- Winter Bird, a character in the television series American Primeval
