= All My Demons Greeting Me as a Friend =

Studio album by Aurora
- Released: 11 March 2016
- Recorded: 2014–March 2015
- Studios: Lydriket (Bergen); The Engine Room (London); Angel (London)
- Genres: Electropop; folk; electronic; synth-pop; Nordic-folk; alternative pop
- Length: 46:48
- Labels: Decca; Glassnote
- Producers: Odd Martin Skålnes; Magnus Skylstad; Nicolas Rebscher; Alf Lund Godbolt; Electric

Aurora chronology
Running with the Wolves (2015)	All My Demons Greeting Me as a Friend (2016)	Infections of a Different Kind (Step 1) (2018)

Singles from All My Demons Greeting Me as a Friend
- 1. "Runaway" Released: 7 February 2015; 2. "Running with the Wolves" Released: 20 April 2015; 3. "Murder Song (5, 4, 3, 2, 1)" Released: 25 August 2015; 4. "Half the World Away" Released: 12 November 2015; 5. "Conqueror" Released: 15 February 2016; 6. "I Went Too Far" Released: 5 July 2016; 7. "Through the Eyes of a Child" Released: 28 March 2025

Singles from All My Demons Greeting Me as a Friend (The Moth Tapes)
- 1. "All My Demons Greeting Me as a Friend" Released: 2 September 2026

All My Demons Greeting Me as a Friend is the debut studio album by Norwegian singer-songwriter Aurora. It was released on 11 March 2016 by Decca and Glassnote Records. The album followed the release of her debut extended play (EP) Running with the Wolves (2015), which contained two songs that were later included on the album. Aurora collaborated with several producers, including Odd Martin Skålnes, Magnus Skylstad, Nicolas Rebscher, Alf Lund Godbolt, and Electric during its recording.

All My Demons Greeting Me as a Friend has been described predominantly as an electropop album, along with folk, electronic, synth-pop, Nordic-folk, and alternative pop that explores fantasy, heartache, life, and death through its lyrics. The album was met with positive reviews from music critics. At the 2017 Spellemannprisen, All My Demons Greeting Me as a Friend won Pop Soloist and was nominated for Album of the Year; the music video of the song "I Went Too Far" won Music Video of the Year. Commercially, the album topped the Norwegian albums chart in its first two-week, while also reaching the top 50 in various North American and European countries, in addition to attaining modest positions on several European charts. The album was certified platinum in Norway and has sold more than 500,000 copies worldwide.

Seven singles supported the album, and 6 of which were supplemented by accompanying music videos. "Runaway" became a sleeper hit six years later and peaked at number one on the Billboard Bubbling Under Hot 100 in the United States. The second single, "Running with the Wolves" reached number 72 in Germany, becoming her first song to chart in that country. An acoustic version of "Murder Song (5, 4, 3, 2, 1)" was released in August 2015 while its studio version was released a month later. Her cover of the song "Half the World Away" by Oasis was released for the 2015 John Lewis Christmas advert and included in the album's deluxe edition. The singles "Conqueror" and "I Went Too Far" were released throughout 2016. After receiving attention for its appearance in a closing scene from Netflix's TV series Adolescence, "Through the Eyes of a Child" was released as the album's seventh single in 2025, nine years after its release.

== Background and development ==
Aurora began playing piano at the age of six, but it wasn't until she became nine that she decided to compose her own songs. When a live performance at her high school's leaving ceremony and a recording of her song "Puppet" were uploaded online, it was quickly discovered by a representative of the Norwegian management agency of Artists Made Management. Even though she initially denied the proposal, she accepted it since her mother advised her that "maybe there's someone out there who desperately needs [her music]." In a few hours, both songs received thousands of visits in Norway, which earned Aurora some recognition in her country, in addition to a fan base on Facebook.

After releasing a series of non-album singles, she followed with the release of her debut EP Running with the Wolves in May 2015, which received positive reviews from online music blogs and national press. Aurora embarked on a short tour in cities of the United States and the United Kingdom to promote it.

Like in Running with the Wolves, most of the album was recorded at Lydriket Studios, located in her native Bergen, while additional recording was taken at The Engine Room and Angel Recording Studios in London. Band members from her live band, Magnus Skylstad and Odd Martin Skålnes produced most of the songs from the album. The songs from the album were written from Aurora's childhood to March 2015, when the album was finished. In early 2016, Aurora featured in British band Icarus' song "Home" and released a cover of David Bowie's "Life on Mars" for the HBO Girls television series.

== Music and lyrics ==
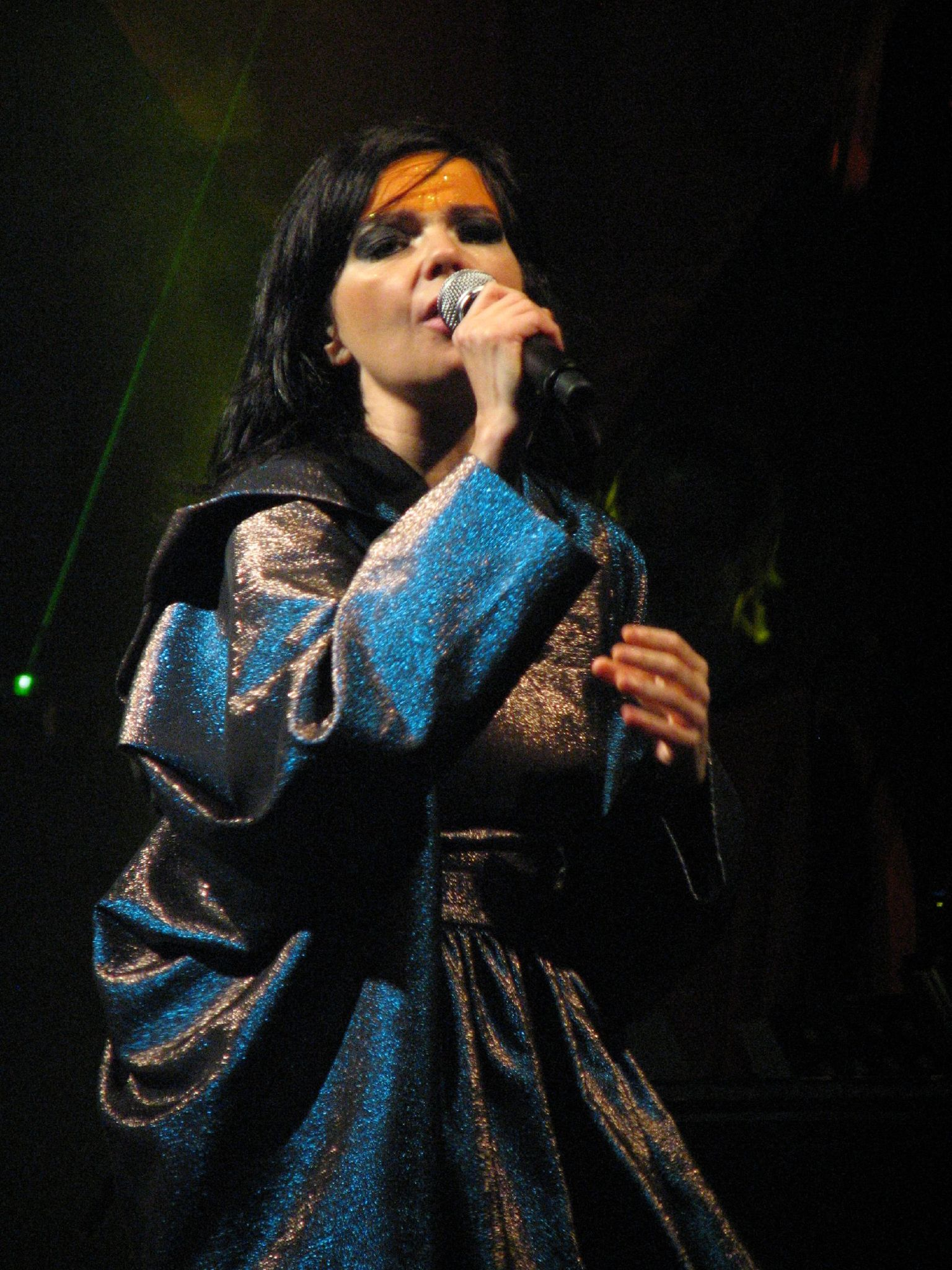
All My Demons Greeting Me as a Friend was compared to the works of various female artists such as Björk (pictured), which Aurora cited as an influence for her.

All My Demons Greeting Me as a Friend is mainly an electropop, folk, electronic, synth-pop, Nordic-folk, and alternative pop record, featuring elements of art pop, new age, disco, and trip hop. The album is mostly a collection of experiences that Aurora wrote about while growing up in her native Norway. According to her, the record is mainly "about bad experiences from the past that can be good memories, [and about] come to peace with everything that happened." Lyrical nature themes throughout the record present vivid lyricisms about fantasy, heartache, life, and death. The productions of the record has been characterised as "minimalist" with spacy electronics, pulsating beats, yearning modalities, and synth-driven sounds. Critics compared the record to the music of artists like Björk, Lorde, Lykke Li, Florence Welch, Goldfrapp, and Enya.

=== Songs ===
All My Demons Greeting Me as a Friend opens with the folktronica and synth-pop number "Runaway". The song featured echoing water droplet effects, screeches, and transitions. Aurora has stated that the song takes an influence from Nordic folk music and is about "a girl begging to go home – the only place where she belongs, or just the only place left to go". The second track, "Conqueror", is a synth-pop and electropop song that features "clattering drum beats building towards a euphoric chorus". The track has been described to be "poppy" and "playful", musically upbeat with a catchy percussive beat, sparkling synths, and a battle-ready chorus. The Scandipop song, "Running with the Wolves" serves as the third track. Its lyrics is about "the dawning realisation that the answer is to be found in this world, however damaged it might be". The fourth track, "Lucky", is a piano and organ-led ballad with lyricisms about "someone striving against their inner voice telling them to give in". "Winter Bird" is the fifth track which has been described as a new age-tinged folk, Nordic folk, and "Enya-ambient-folk dream" with nature themed lyrics. The sixth track, "I Went Too Far" is a disco-inflected pop and synth-pop ballad. The ballad has been described as "solemn" with a synth-swirling chorus and dance-insistent beat.

"Through the Eyes of a Child" is the seventh track which is also the seventh single from the album. It has been described as an "icily atmospheric" ballad that "showcases [a] lovely piano and voice". The eighth track, "Warrior" has an upbeat uptempo sound that showcases the brighter side of the record with a vulnerable and authentic self-love inspired message. The lyrics are about someone "struggling to let love back into their life". Ninth track, "Murder Song (5, 4, 3, 2, 1)" is a solemn and shimmering ballad with a "creeping" title that has a smooth and synthy minor. Lyrically, the ballad speaks about a mercy killing of a protagonist "recounting the story of her own death". The tenth track, "Home" has been described as a "chilly, almost robotic" song. Eleventh track "Under the Water" and twelfth track "Black Water Lillies", share the same subject about drowning and death within the lyrics. On "Under the Water", the ballad talks about the romanticisation of drowning. The closing track of the standard edition, "Black Water Lilies" follows the same theme as "Under The Water". "Black Water Lilies" features extended notes, reverberating piano, and simple beats, about "overcoming forces both in the natural and mental realms".

== Release and promotion ==
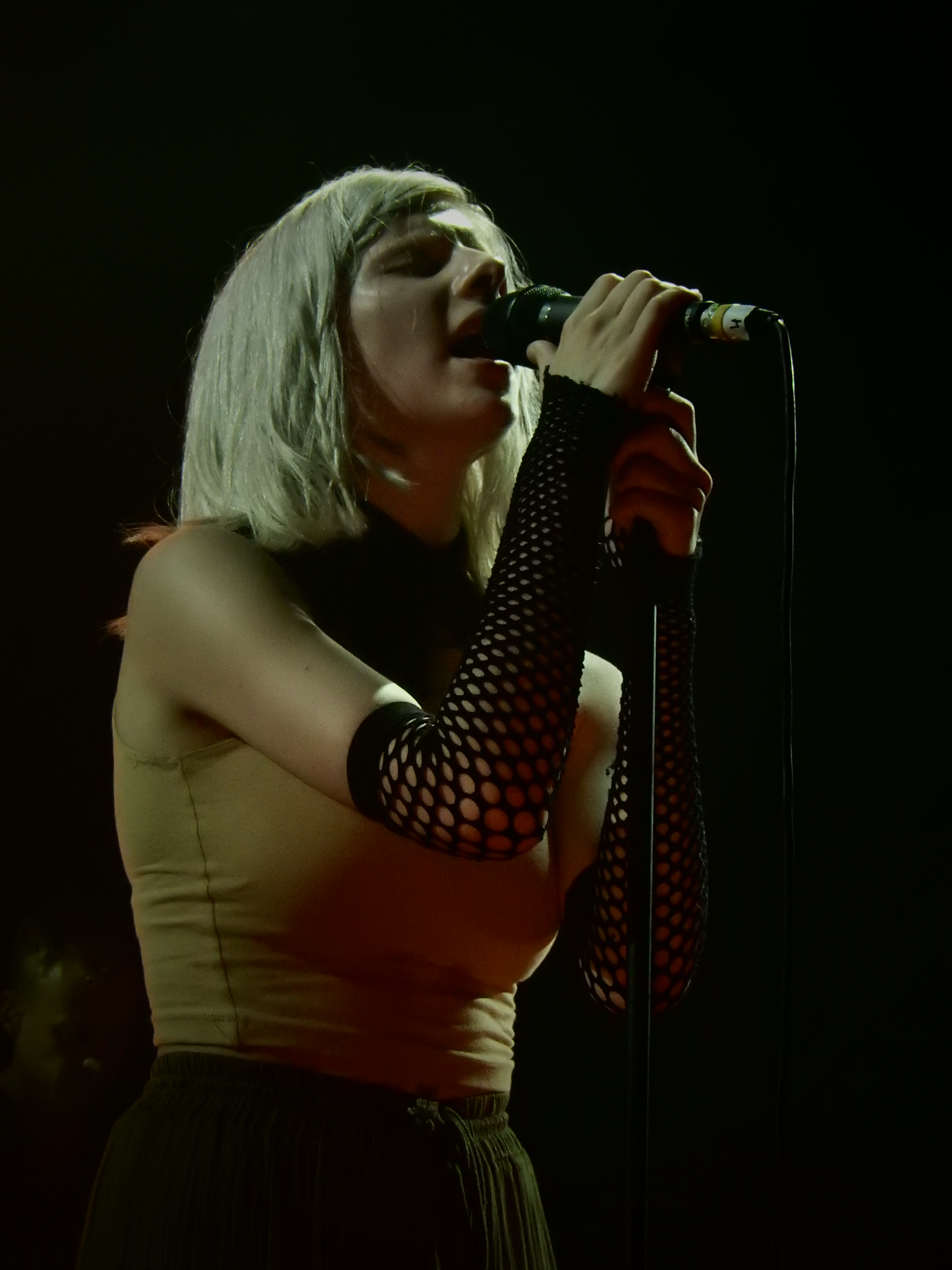
Aurora performing at the Institute of Contemporary Arts, London

Aurora initially announced that her debut studio album was expected for release in September 2015, but was later postponed. During that time, she revealed that some of the songs were "less dreamy" and "more happy" in comparison to previous ones and concluded that "it's not just a sad and dark record, there is some hope in it [...] which is nice!" Months later, Aurora announced in January 2016 that the album would be released on 11 March of the same year. The album in its standard and deluxe editions was issued on 11 March 2016, by Decca and Glassnote Records. An international deluxe edition was released digitally for several countries on 26 August 2016.

To promote the album, Aurora performed at the 2015 Nobel Peace Prize Concert, saying that she and her family "have been following it from the living room at home for many years", and "it is an incredibly beautiful thing to be a part of." Her presentation was praised by the concert's host Jay Leno. She has played a sold-out headline show in London and supported Of Monsters and Men at Brixton Academy in November 2015. On 14 March 2016, Aurora made her American television debut on The Tonight Show Starring Jimmy Fallon, performing "Conqueror", which was later performed on Conan. She also starred in her own short documentaries: "Into the Light" and "Nothing is Eternal", directed by Isaac Ravishankara and produced by The Fader. She also partnered with YouTube for a creative content distribution program, becoming the first in a series of emerging artists.

In September 2026, Aurora announced the re-release of All My Demons Greeting Me as a Friend under the subtitle The Moth Tapes, which released on 25 September in celebration of its tenth anniversary. The unreleased title track was released on 2 September, and the reissue includes demo versions of "The Silent Twins", "Running with the Wolves", and "Let Me Heal You".

=== Tour ===
All My Demons Greeting Me as a Friend received further promotion from her second headlining concert tour, the All My Demons Tour, which began on 1 February 2016 in Manchester, United Kingdom.

== Critical reception ==
Professional ratings
Aggregate scores
Source	Rating
AnyDecentMusic?	6.6/10
Metacritic	80/100
Review scores
Source	Rating
AllMusic	4/5 stars
DIY	3/5 stars
Entertainment Weekly	A−
Gigwise	9/10 stars
The Guardian	3/5 stars
The Irish Times	3/5 stars
The Line of Best Fit	8.5/10
The Music	3.5/5 stars
musicOMH	4/5 stars
The Times	3/5 stars

All My Demons Greeting Me as a Friend received generally positive reviews from music critics. At Metacritic, which assigns a normalised rating out of 100 to reviews from mainstream critics, the album received an average score of 80, which indicates "generally favorable reviews", based on 10 reviews.

Writing for Entertainment Weekly, Madison Vain commended Aurora's vocals and production and added that the record "channels a similar magical vibe as the art-pop superstar [Björk]". The song "Conqueror" received particular praise as being "simply a cut above the rest of the songs. It’s a glorious mix of synths, powerful drumbeats, and a chorus that is as memorable as it is fun to listen to."

== Accolades ==
All My Demons Greeting Me as a Friend won the Norwegian GAFFA Award for Norwegian Album of the Year and the Spellemann Award for Pop Soloist and Music Video of the Year for the song "I Went Too Far". It was also nominated for Album of the Year. She was also awarded a plaque on the Bergen Walk of Fame, which is located on Nøstegaten Street in the Nøstet district.

Year	Award	Category	Result	Ref.
2017	GAFFA Awards (Norway)	Norwegian Album of the Year	Won	
2017	Spellemannprisen	Album of the Year	Nominated	
2017	Spellemannprisen	Pop Soloist	Won	

== Commercial performance ==
All My Demons Greeting Me as a Friend debuted at number one on the Norwegian VG-lista Topp 40 Album with first-week sales of 4,800 units, topping the chart for two consecutive weeks.

In the United States, the album debuted at number No. 150 on the Billboard 200 with 5,000 album-equivalent units. All My Demons Greeting Me as a Friend has sold 500,000 units worldwide as of September 28, 2018.

== Track listing ==
All tracks produced by Odd Martin Skålnes and Magnus Åserud Skylstad, except where noted.

All My Demons Greeting Me as a Friend – Standard edition
No.	Title	Writer(s)	Producer(s)	Length
1.	"Runaway"	Aurora Aksnes; Magnus Åserud Skylstad		4:08
2.	"Conqueror"	Aksnes; Geir Luedy; Odd Martin Skålnes; Skylstad	Skålnes; Skylstad; Jeremy Wheatley^{[b]}	3:27
3.	"Running with the Wolves"	Aksnes; Michelle Leonard; Nicolas Rebscher	Skålnes; Rebscher; Skylstad	3:14
4.	"Lucky"	Aksnes; Skålnes		4:04
5.	"Winter Bird"	Aksnes; Jonathan Wright		4:07
6.	"I Went Too Far"	Aksnes; Skylstad; Skålnes	Skålnes; Skylstad; Wheatley^{[b]}	3:27
7.	"Through the Eyes of a Child"	Aksnes; Leonard; Alf Lund Godbolt	Skålnes; Skylstad; Godbolt	4:34
8.	"Warrior"	Aksnes; Leonard; Alexander Knolle; Rebscher; Skylstad; Janis Liphardt	Skålnes; Skylstad; Wheatley^{[b]}	3:43
9.	"Murder Song (5, 4, 3, 2, 1)"	Aksnes; Skålnes		3:20
10.	"Home"	Aksnes; Daniel Wilson; Thomas Hull		3:32
11.	"Under the Water"	Aksnes; Edvard Førre Erfjord; Henrik Barman Michelsen	Skålnes; Electric; Skylstad	4:24
12.	"Black Water Lilies"	Aksnes; Skålnes; Skylstad		4:42
Total length:				46:48

All My Demons Greeting Me as a Friend – Deluxe edition (bonus tracks)
No.	Title	Writer(s)	Producer(s)	Length
13.	"Half the World Away" (Oasis cover)	Noel Gallagher		3:18
14.	"Murder Song (5, 4, 3, 2, 1)" (Acoustic)	Aksnes; Skålnes		3:38
15.	"Nature Boy" (Nat King Cole cover)	George Alexander Aberle		2:59
16.	"Wisdom Cries"	Aksnes; Leonard; Rebscher	Rebscher	4:07
17.	"Running with the Wolves" (Pablo Nouvelle Remix)	Aksnes; Leonard; Rebscher	Skålnes; Rebscher; Skylstad; Pablo Nouvelle^{[c]}	3:50
Total length:				64:40

All My Demons Greeting Me as a Friend – International deluxe edition (bonus tracks)
No.	Title	Writer(s)	Producer(s)	Length
18.	"I Went Too Far" (PWNDTIAC Remix)	Aksnes; Skylstad; Skålnes	Skålnes; Skylstad; Wheatley^{[b]}; PWNDTIAC^{[c]}	4:43
19.	"Under Stars" (Loon Remix)	Aksnes; Dan McDougall	McDougall; Skålnes; Loon^{[c]}	3:33
20.	"Mr. Tambourine Man" (Bob Dylan cover)	Bob Dylan		4:11
Total length:				77:07

All My Demons Greeting Me as a Friend: The Moth Tapes – 10th anniversary reissue
No.	Title	Writer(s)	Producer(s)	Length
13.	"Black Water Lilies (Vocal Files)"	Aksnes; Skålnes; Skylstad		4:37
14.	"All My Demons Greeting Me as a Friend"	Aksnes; Tobias Kuhn; Nikolai Potthoff	Kuhn; Potthoff	3:41
15.	"Let Me Heal You (Demo)"	Aksnes; Leonard; Emma Harper	Harper	3:44
16.	"Runaway (14th August 2013 Demo)"	Aksnes; Skylstad	Skylstad	3:37
17.	"Running With the Wolves (Hunting Demo)"	Aksnes; Leonard; Rebscher	Rebscher	3:51
18.	"The Silent Twins (Demo)"	Aksnes; Sacha Skarbek	Skarbek; Florian Reutter	4:38
Total length:				70:56

Notes

- ^{^b} signifies an additional producer.
- ^{^c} signifies a remixer.
- Physical releases of the album title "Murder Song (5, 4, 3, 2, 1)" as "Murder Song".

== Personnel ==
Credits adapted from the liner notes of All My Demons Greeting Me as a Friend.

Musicians

- Aurora Aksnes – vocals (all tracks); piano (tracks 1, 6, 7, 12); synth (track 1)
- Alf Lund Godbolt – synth (tracks 2, 4); programming (track 7)
- Nicolas Rebscher – synth (track 3); keyboards (track 16); programming (track 3)
- Odd Martin Skålnes – synth (tracks 1, 5–9, 12); piano (tracks 10, 13); drums & percussion (track 2); programming (tracks 2, 4–6, 11–13); bass guitar (tracks 2–4, 9, 10); acoustic guitar (tracks 14, 15)
- Magnus Åserud Skylstad – synth (tracks 1, 4, 7, 8); piano (track 2); drums & percussion (all tracks)
- Øystein Skar – synth (track 10)
- Pete Davis – keyboards & programming (tracks 2, 6, 8)
- Michelle Leonard – keyboards & programming (track 16)
- Edvard Erfjord – programming (track 11)
- Henrik Michelsen – programming (track 11)
- Matias Monsen – cello (track 15)
- Askjell Solstrand – wurlitzer organ (track 13)
- Geoff Lawson – conductor (The Royal Philharmonic Orchestra) (track 13)
- The Royal Philharmonic Orchestra – orchestra (track 13)

Technical

- Magnus Åserud Skylstad – production & recording (all tracks), mixing (tracks 1–4, 7, 10, 12, 14–16)
- Neil Comber – mixing (tracks 4, 5, 9, 11)
- Odd Martin Skålnes – production & recording (all tracks), mixing (tracks 1–4, 7, 10, 12, 14–16)
- Jeremy Wheatley – additional production, programming & mixing (tracks 2, 6, 8)
- Alex Wharton – mastering (all tracks)
- Edvard Erfjord – production & recording (track 11)
- Henrik Michelsen – production & recording (track 11)

Artwork

- Jane Long – artwork, graphics, design
- Knut Skylstad – photography
- Bent René Synnevåg – photography

== Charts ==
Weekly chart performance for All My Demons Greeting Me as a Friend
Chart (2016)	Peak position
Australian Albums (ARIA)	51
Austrian Albums (Ö3 Austria)	50
Belgian Albums (Ultratop Flanders)	40
Belgian Albums (Ultratop Wallonia)	95
Canadian Albums (Billboard)	43
Czech Albums (ČNS IFPI)	33
Dutch Albums (Album Top 100)	17
German Albums (Offizielle Top 100)	24
Irish Albums (IRMA)	66
Norwegian Albums (VG-lista)	1
Swiss Albums (Schweizer Hitparade)	41
UK Albums (Official Charts)	28
US Billboard 200	150
US Top Alternative Albums (Billboard)	21
US Top Rock Albums (Billboard)	28

Chart (2026)	Peak position
Nigerian Albums (TurnTable)	84

== Certifications ==
Certifications for All My Demons Greeting Me as a Friend
Region	Certification	Certified units/sales
Denmark (IFPI Danmark)	Gold	10,000^{‡}
New Zealand (RMNZ)	Gold	7,500^{‡}
Norway (IFPI Norway)	2× Platinum	40,000^{‡}
United Kingdom (BPI)	Silver	73,383
Streaming
Philippines	Gold	600,000,000
Summaries
Worldwide	—	500,000
^{‡} Sales+streaming figures based on certification alone.

== Release history ==
Release dates and formats for All My Demons Greeting Me as a Friend
Region	Date	Format(s)	Version	Label	Ref.
Various	11 March 2016	Digital download; streaming; CD	Standard; Deluxe	Decca; Glassnote	
Various	26 August 2016	Digital download; streaming	International Deluxe	Decca; Glassnote	

== See also ==
- List of number-one albums in Norway
