= Infections of a Different Kind (Step 1) =

Studio album by Aurora
- Released: 28 September 2018
- Recorded: January–April 2018
- Studio: La Fabrique (Saint-Rémy de Provence)
- Genre: Pop; electropop; art pop
- Length: 33:13
- Label: Decca; Glassnote
- Producer: Jakwob; Couros; MyRiot; Askjell Solstrand; Aurora; Electric

Aurora chronology
All My Demons Greeting Me as a Friend (2016)	Infections of a Different Kind (Step 1) (2018)	A Different Kind of Human (Step 2) (2019)

Singles from Infections of a Different Kind (Step 1)
- 1. "Queendom" Released: 16 April 2018; 2. "Forgotten Love" Released: 17 August 2018

Infections of a Different Kind (Step 1) is the second studio album (Note: While Aurora herself called Infections of a Different Kind (Step 1) an extended play (EP) in a 2018 interview and The Guardian's Michael Cragg later referred to it as the first part of "an EP series", a preponderance of publications call Infections of a Different Kind (Step 1) an album, as do streaming services like Spotify, Apple Music, and Tidal. Additionally, Aurora refers to both projects as "two sister albums" in the liner notes for A Different Kind of Human (Step 2). Because the majority of secondary sources refer to the release as an album, this article uses the same categorization.) by Norwegian singer-songwriter and record producer Aurora. It was released digitally on 28 September 2018 and physically on 1 November 2019 by Decca and Glassnote Records. It serves as the first part of a two-part album, the second part being her third studio album A Different Kind of Human (Step 2) (2019). Aurora enlisted producers Askjell Solstrand, Jakwob, Couros and MyRiot, along with previous collaborators Magnus Skylstad and Electric.

Infections of a Different Kind (Step 1) was described as a pop, electropop and art pop record, though it also features elements of synth-pop, chamber pop, folk, experimental pop, and futurepop. Its lyrical themes were described to be domestic abuse, global warming, connection versus connectivity, fear of intimacy, and empowerment. The album received critical acclaim from music critics, who complimented Aurora's involvement in the production of the record as well as her progression from her debut album.

Infections of a Different Kind (Step 1) was supported by the release of the singles "Queendom" and "Forgotten Love", which were released in April and August 2018, respectively. The release was a minor commercial success; it peaked at number seven in Norway and at number 191 in the Netherlands and was certified platinum in the former country. The music video for "Queendom" was nominated for Music Video of the Year at the 2019 Spellemannprisen.

== Background and production ==
"[Infections of a Different Kind] (Step 1) is a natural step after my first album, which was about looking into yourself, looking at all of it and accepting all of it. [...] This step is about moving on with that. I think that we are meant to really fight for each other, but I think it really prevents us having the capacity to see other people when we're in pain. First you accept that life comes with pain, then you really work on it. I really want people to listen to this step and feel like they're getting stronger."

— Aurora explaining the concept behind Infections of a Different Kind (Step 1) to NME.

When announcing the release of her debut album All My Demons Greeting Me as a Friend (2016), Aurora said that it was "the first album of many" that she has planned. In an interview with Gigwise, she explained that because of most of the record was recorded a year before, its sound "feels very old" and that she had "to let things go;" she also said that the writing process of her following album had already begun. In October 2016, during a Facebook live stream, Aurora stated that she had fifteen demos and had written around a thousand songs to that date.

On 30 September 2017, Aurora posted on her Instagram account that she began the production of her following album. Some of the new material was anticipated in several live performances, including festivals like Lollapalooza and Coachella. Aurora travelled to La Fabrique, a farmhouse studio located in southern France, to record Infections of a Different Kind (Step 1) in January 2018. The production included new producers Askjell Solstrand and Roy Kerr and Tim Bran from MyRiot, with Aurora herself also involved in this aspect. Her stay in France during the album's recording was filmed for Aurora's documentary Once Aurora. The album was mixed and mastered in Bergen, with Aurora announcing through an Instagram story on 3 April 2018 that it was finished.

Aurora initially stated to Idolator in April 2018 that Infections of a Different Kind (Step 1) was originally a full-length album with 11 tracks. Nevertheless, she later revealed two months later that the album was split in two parts, the first part being Infections of a Different Kind (Step 1). Aurora chose to divide the record to give listeners more time to every track, since she felt the original project would be "heavy and time-consuming." She acknowledged during a 2019 interview with Clash that the concept of the album "was two different aspects of one process"; she decided to use scrapped tracks from Infections of a Different Kind (Step I) for her following album.

=== Scrapped tracks ===
According to Aurora, forty songs were written for the album, and she chose the ones she considered to be the "best". She revealed that some of the songs "will remain unreleased for quite some time, but also a few of them will be on the album." The songs "Animal" and "The Seed" were originally written for the album but were later included in her third album A Different Kind of Human (Step 2), following the split of the record. Both songs were performed live alongside tracks from Infections of a Different Kind (Step 1). In a September 2017 interview, Aurora was unsure to add "festival songs" like "Feeling", "Soft Universe" and "In Bottles" to the tracklist of Infections of a Different Kind (Step I); "Soft Universe" was released as the album's seventh track, while "In Bottles" made it onto A Different Kind of Human (Step 2). Aside of the tracks performed live, snippets of some songs appeared in Once Aurora, with only two song titles ("Spotlight" and "Witches") appearing in the closing credits.

== Music and lyrics ==
Infections of a Different Kind (Step 1) has been described as a pop, electropop and art pop record with elements of synth-pop, chamber pop, folk, experimental pop, and futurepop. Aurora described her musical direction as "still so fun" because of her involvement in the production, stating "I now know more about myself." The album's sound incorporates folktronica soundscapes, vocal harmonizations, expansive reverb, layered synthesizers and tribal percussion. Its production was characterized as contained and deliberate in comparison to the intense sound of All My Demons Greeting Me as a Friend.

Aurora called Infections of a Different Kind (Step 1) a "power album", with the desire "to [make] people feel powerful, to feel like they have this extra support." Its lyrical themes were described to be about domestic abuse, global warming, connection versus connectivity, fear of intimacy and empowerment, written with personal and affecting lyrics. She commented that the meanings of the songs "depends on the way that people listen to it", wanting to leave them open to interpretation. While maintaining some of the themes and stories of her previous album, the album marks the first time that Aurora has included themes of politics and sexuality in her music. Most of her inspiration for the record came from the interaction that she had with her fans during her first tour. The album's title comes from the eighth track, which Aurora declared as "the most important song I've ever written".

== Release and promotion ==
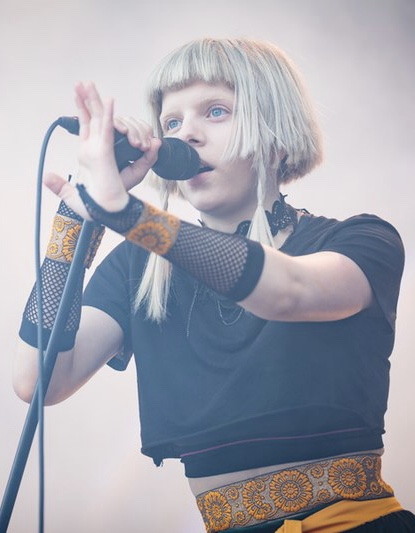
Aurora performing at Stavernfestivalen (2018)

Aurora initially wanted to release new music in November 2016, however, she noted that it was not possible due to her touring schedule in promotion of her debut album. In September of that year, she teased a possible release date in November 2017. Aurora stated in March 2018 that the album was expected to be released in the fourth quarter of 2018, without giving an exact date. A trailer titled "Our Queendom Come" was released on 5 April 2017, which led fans to speculate the name as the record's title. Infections of a Different Kind (Step 1) was released to digital music platforms on 28 September 2018 as a surprise release. A sequel, which was revealed to be titled A Different Kind of Human (Step 2), followed on 7 June 2019. CDs and LPs were released on 1 November 2019, a year after the record's digital release.

The same day of Infections of a Different Kind (Step 1)'s digital release, several magazines like Clash, The Line of Best Fit and NME interviewed Aurora about various topics, including her fame, her home, climate change, the concept behind the album and its upcoming follow-up. She appeared on Late Night with Seth Meyers, where she performed "Queendom".

=== Singles ===
"Queendom" was released as the album's lead single on 16 April 2018, premiering on Zane Lowe's Apple Beats 1. The music video for "Queendom" saw its release on 2 May 2018, and it included a message to her LGBT fans; such message was portrayed by Aurora herself kissing one of her female dancers, during what was described as a "big kissing party" that shows that "every type of love is accepted and embraced" in the singer's "queendom". The clip was nomitated for Music Video of the Year at the Spellemannprisen '17, eventually losing to Hkeem's "Ghettoparasitt".

The song "Animal" was originally expected to be released as the second single from Infections of a Different Kind (Step 1), however it was later released as A Different Kind of Human (Step 2)'s lead single in January 2019. The album's second single, "Forgotten Love", followed on 17 August 2018. A video was filmed but it was never released. However, some snippets of it appeared in a short documentary about Bergen's musical scene where Aurora was interviewed.

=== Tour ===
The album received further promotion from her third headlining concert tour, which started on 10 October 2018 in Manchester, United Kingdom and ended on 28 May 2019 in Mexico City, Mexico.

== Critical reception ==
Professional ratings
Review scores
Source	Rating
A Bit of Pop Music	Positive
Immortal Reviews	94/100
The Line of Best Fit	9/10
Mojo	3/5 stars
Mystic Sons	8/10
Q	4/5 stars
Radio UTD	4.5/5 stars

Infections of a Different Kind (Step 1) was met with acclaim from music critics. Jack Bray of The Line of Best Fit praised the dynamism and flexibility of Aurora's vocals and her involvement in the production of the album, remarking that she "never loses any instrument or voice in spite of the minutiae of her producing choices, as a result, a tangible sense of her personality comes through." A writer of the blog A Bit of Pop Music shared similar thoughts in regards to its songwriting and production, commending the track "All Is Soft Inside" as her "most accomplished work to date." Writing for Mystic Sons, Chris Bound agreed that "this new half-album still manages to pack one hell of a punch throughout as the frontwoman seems to take on the guise of an unstoppable juggernaut." In a less favourable review, Kieron Tyler writing for Mojo commented that the record lacked musical focus, lamenting that "Aurora herself is mostly buried in the album." Radio UTD's Zachary Royal suggested that she "matured quite quickly and is now more comfortable in her element."

Publication	Accolade	Rank	Ref.
A Bit of Pop Music	The 20 Best Pop Albums of 2018	—	
CJLO	Best of 2018 Top Pop Albums	9	
Indie88	The Most Overlooked Albums of 2018	—	
Immortal Reviews	Immortal Reviews' Top 50 Albums Of 2018	8	
The Line of Best Fit	The Best Albums of 2018	41	
Phil Marriott	Top 10 Albums of 2018	—	

== Commercial performance ==
Infections of a Different Kind (Step 1) debuted at number seven on the Norwegian VG-lista Topp 40 Album, marking Aurora's biggest opening week in sales ever in the country, with 5,800 units. Elsewhere in Europe, the album peaked at number 191 in the Netherlands.

== Track listing ==
Infections of a Different Kind (Step I) track listing
No.	Title	Writer(s)	Producer(s)	Length
1.	"Queendom"	Aurora Aksnes; Fiona Bevan; James Edward Jacob; Couros Shebani	Jakwob; Couros; Aurora^{[a]}; Magnus Skylstad^{[a]}	3:27
2.	"Forgotten Love"	Aksnes; Martin Sjølie	MyRiot; Askjell Solstrand; Skylstad^{[a]}	3:28
3.	"Gentle Earthquakes"	Aksnes; Bevan; Jacob; Sheibani	MyRiot; Solstrand	3:47
4.	"All Is Soft Inside"	Aksnes; Timothy Bran; Roy Kerr	MyRiot; Solstrand^{[a]}	5:09
5.	"It Happened Quiet"	Aksnes; Sacha Skarbek	MyRiot; Solstrand; Skylstad^{[a]}	4:09
6.	"Churchyard"	Aksnes; Edvard Erfjord; Henrik Michelsen	Aurora; Electric	3:46
7.	"Soft Universe"	Aksnes; Bevan; Jacob; Sheibani	Jakwob; Couros; Aurora^{[a]}; Skylstad^{[a]}	4:00
8.	"Infections of a Different Kind"	Aksnes	MyRiot; Solstrand	5:27
Total length:				33:13

Notes

- ^{^[a]} signifies an additional producer.

== Personnel ==
Credits adapted from Tidal.

Musicians

- Aurora Aksnes – vocals (all tracks), additional vocals (1, 7), drums, keyboards (2, 3, 5, 6); percussion (1, 3, 5, 6, 7), programming (2, 3, 5, 7, 8)
- Magnus Skylstad – drums, drum programming, cello, additional keyboards, percussion (1, 7); programming (1, 2, 7)
- Couros Sheibani – drums, drum programming, percussion, synthesizer, programming (1, 7)
- James Jacob – drums, drum programming, percussion, synthesizer, programming (1, 7)
- Mathias Wang – cymbal (1)
- Askjell – keyboards, programming (2–5, 8)
- Roy Kerr – keyboards, programming (2–5, 8)
- Tim Bran – keyboards, programming (2–5, 8)
- Ellen Holmås – cello (5, 6)
- Karoline Brevik – cello (5, 6)
- Marit Aspås – cello (5, 6)
- Torleif Holm – cello (5, 6)
- Ruth Potter – harp (5, 6)
- Knut Anders Vestad – strings (5, 6)
- Therese Kinzler Eriksen – strings (5, 6)
- Oslo Fagottkor – choir (6)

Technical

- Aurora – production (6), additional production (1, 7)
- Askjell – production (2, 3, 8), additional production (4)
- MyRiot – production (2–5, 8)
- Couros – production (1, 7)
- Jakwob – production (1, 7)
- Electric – production (6)
- Magnus Skylstad – additional production (1, 2, 5, 7), mixing, engineering (all tracks)
- Javed Kurd – vocal production (6)
- Steinar Svendsen – vocal production (6)
- Mark Bishop – engineering (1)
- Daniel Cayote – engineering (2, 3, 5, 8)
- Hervé Le Guil – engineering (2, 3, 5, 8)
- Jo Ranheim – engineering (6)
- Peer Espen Ursfjord – engineering (6)
- Morgane Mayollet – engineering assistance (2, 3, 5, 8)
- Chris Sansom – mastering (1–6, 8)
- Alex Wharton – mastering (7)

== Charts ==
Chart performance for Infections of a Different Kind (Step 1)
Chart (2018–2022)	Peak position
Dutch Albums (Album Top 100)	191
Norwegian Albums (VG-lista)	7
Norwegian Vinyl Albums (IFPI Norge)	3
Scottish Albums (Official Charts)	80
UK Album Downloads (Official Charts)	45

== Certifications ==
Certifications for Infections of a Different Kind (Step 1)
Region	Certification	Certified units/sales
Norway (IFPI Norway)	Platinum	20,000^{‡}
United Kingdom	—	11,886
^{‡} Sales+streaming figures based on certification alone.

== Release history ==
Release dates and formats for Infections of a Different Kind (Step 1)
Region	Date	Format(s)	Label	Ref.
Various	28 September 2018	Digital download; streaming	Decca; Glassnote; Petroleum	
Various	1 November 2019	CD; LP	Decca; Glassnote	
Norway	22 November 2019	LP	Petroleum	
