= Queendom (Aurora song) =

2018 single by Aurora

Single by Aurora

from the album Infections of a Different Kind (Step 1)
- Released: 16 April 2018
- Genre: Synth-pop; ethereal pop
- Length: 3:27
- Label: Decca; Glassnote
- Songwriters: Aurora Aksnes; Fiona Bevan; James Edward Jacob; Couros Shebani
- Producers: James Edward Jacob; Couros Shebani; Magnus Skylstad

Aurora singles chronology
"Ascension" (2018)	"Queendom" (2018)	"Forgotten Love" (2018)

Music video
- "Queendom" on YouTube

"Queendom" is a song by Norwegian singer-songwriter Aurora. It was released on 16 April 2018, through Decca and Glassnote, as the lead single from Aurora's second studio album, Infections of a Different Kind (Step 1) (2018). It was premiered on Zane Lowe's Apple Beats 1. A harp version of the song was released on May 18, 2018.

== Background ==
Aurora originally intended to release new music in November 2016, but her touring commitments for her debut album made it unfeasible. In September of that year, she hinted at a potential release in November 2017. By March 2018, she confirmed that the album was expected in the fourth quarter of the year, though she did not specify a date. On 5 April 2017, she released a trailer titled Our Queendom Come, prompting speculation among fans that this could be the album's title.

Aurora described "Queendom" as carrying an important message and reflecting the broader perspective of her new album. She highlighted themes of empowerment and inclusivity, referencing the song's lyrics: "The underdogs are my lions, the silent ones are choir – the women will be my soldiers, the weight of life on their shoulders." Aurora emphasized that the song is meant for everyone, including men and even the planets, marking the beginning of a new chapter in her music.

She further explained that "Queendom" is about celebrating all our differences, embracing women, children, animals, men, and especially the quiet and introverted individuals. She envisions it as a place where shy and lonely people can come together, finding solace in shared experiences and, ultimately, no longer feeling alone.

== Composition ==
"Queendom" is a synth-pop and ethereal pop song. Its production incorporates a four-on-the-floor beat backed by tumbling drums, lavish string arrangements and glittering synthesizers. The song features a recording of female drummers playing in the streets of Brazil.

== Critical reception ==
Jon Pareles, writing for The New York Times, praised the song as "a dance-floor declaration of female empowerment". Raleigh Mathis of The 405 compared its "cinematic and grand" sound to the works of Björk and Lykke Li.

== Music video ==
The music video for "Queendom" was released on 2 May 2018 and featured a message of inclusivity for Aurora's LGBT fans. This was symbolized by Aurora herself kissing one of her female dancers during what she described as a "big kissing party", representing the acceptance and celebration of all forms of love within her "queendom." The video was nominated for Music Video of the Year at the 2019 Spellemannprisen but ultimately lost to Hkeem's "Ghettoparasitt".

Regarding the music video, Aurora explained that it celebrates diversity, embracing women, men, children, animals, introverts, and the lonely. She described "Queendom" as a space where people can come together, find solace, and ultimately feel less alone.

== Live performances ==
Aurora performed "Queendom" at Late Night with Seth Meyers on 23 May 2018.

== Credits and personnel ==
Credits adapted from Tidal.

Musicians

- Aurora Aksnes – vocals, additional vocals, percussion, additional production
- Magnus Skylstad – drums, drum programming, cello, additional keyboards, percussion, programming, additional production, mixing, engineering
- Couros – drums, drum programming, percussion, synthesizer, programming, production
- Jakwob – drums, drum programming, percussion, synthesizer, programming, production
- Mathias Wang – cymbal
- Mark Bishop – engineering
- Chris Sansom – mastering

== Charts ==
Chart performance for "Queendom"
Chart (2018)	Peak position
Mexico Ingles Airplay (Billboard)	14

== Certifications ==
Certifications for "Queendom"
Region	Certification	Certified units/sales
Brazil (Pro-Música Brasil)	Gold	20,000^{‡}
^{‡} Sales+streaming figures based on certification alone.
