= Running with the Wolves =

EP by Aurora
- Released: 4 May 2015
- Recorded: 2013–2015
- Studio: Lydriket (Bergen) (Note: All tracks); Shed Studios (London) (Note: Additional recording on track 4); Electric Music (London) (Note: Additional recording on track 5)
- Genre: Electronic
- Length: 14:59
- Label: Decca; Universal
- Producer: Aurora; Magnus Skylstad; Odd Martin Skålnes; Dan McDougall; Electric

Aurora chronology
| Running with the Wolves (2015) | All My Demons Greeting Me as a Friend (2016) |

Singles from Running with the Wolves
- 1. "Runaway" Released: 7 February 2015; 2. "Running with the Wolves" Released: 20 April 2015

Running with the Wolves is the debut extended play (EP) by Norwegian singer-songwriter Aurora. It was released on 4 May 2015 via Decca and Universal Music.

Running with the Wolves was supported by two singles: "Runaway" and the title track.

== Composition ==
Running with the Wolves is an electronic EP. According to Aurora, every song on the EP has a different theme: "a very morbid one, a dreamy one, an animalistic one and then a quite sad one." "Runaway" was released as the lead single of the EP on 7 February 2015 through Petroleum Records. The title track was released as the second and final single of the album. The song has also been adapted to the film Wolfwalkers (2020) produced by Tom Moore. Previous singles "Awakening" and "Under Stars" were included on the vinyl edition of the EP.

== Release and promotion ==
Running with the Wolves was released on 4 May 2015.

To promote the EP, Aurora did several performances. She performed at the 2015 Nobel Peace Prize Concert. She has played a sold-out headline show in London and supported Of Monsters and Men at Brixton Academy in November 2015. "Runaway" was used at the finale of the third season of the Fox American television psychological thriller series The Following.

== Track listings ==
Digital and CD edition
| No. | Title | Writer(s) | Producer(s) | Length |
|---|---|---|---|---|
| 1. | "Runaway" | Aurora Aksnes; Magnus Åserud Skylstad | Odd Martin Skålnes; Skylstad | 4:10 |
| 2. | "Running with the Wolves" | Aksnes; Michelle Leonard; Nicolas Rebscher | Skålnes; Rebscher; Skylstad | 3:12 |
| 3. | "In Boxes" | Aksnes; Edvard Førre Erfjord; Henrik Michelsen | Electric; Skylstad | 3:22 |
| 4. | "Little Boy in the Grass" | Aksnes; Skylstad; Skålnes | Skalnes; Skylstad | 4:15 |
| Total length: | | | | 14:59 |

Vinyl edition
| No. | Title | Writer(s) | Length |
|---|---|---|---|
| 1. | "Runaway" | Aurora Aksnes; Magnus Aserud Skylstad | 4:10 |
| 2. | "Running with the Wolves" | Aksnes; Michelle Leonard; Nicolas Rebscher | 3:12 |
| 3. | "Awakening" | Odd Martin Skålnes | 3:40 |
| 4. | "Under Stars" | Dan McDougall | 3:19 |
| 5. | "In Boxes" | Aksnes; Edvard Førre Erfjord; Henrik Michelsen | 3:22 |
| 6. | "Little Boy in the Grass" | Aksnes; Skylstad; Skålnes | 4:15 |
| Total length: | | | 21:58 |

Notes

- The vinyl version of the EP includes an alternate version of "Awakening" than the single release.

== Accolades ==
| Year | Award | Category | Result | Ref. |
|---|---|---|---|---|
| 2015 | European Border Breakers Awards | Album of the Year: Norway | Won | |

== Personnel ==
Credits adapted from the liner notes of the vinyl version of Running with the Wolves.

=== Musicians ===
- Aurora Aksnes – vocals (all tracks); piano (tracks 1, 3, 6); synth (track 1)
- Alf Lund Godbolt – synth (tracks 2, 4); programming (track 7)
- Nicolas Rebscher – synth (track 3); keyboards (track 16); programming (track 3)
- Odd Martin Skålnes – synth (tracks 1, 5–9, 12); piano (tracks 10, 13); drums & percussion (track 2); programming (tracks 2, 4–6, 11–13); bass guitar (tracks 2–4, 9, 10); acoustic guitar (tracks 14, 15)
- Magnus Åserud Skylstad – drums (all tracks); piano (track 2); drums & percussion (all tracks)
- Øystein Skar – synth (track 10)
- Pete Davis – keyboards & programming (tracks 2, 6, 8)
- Michelle Leonard – keyboards & programming (track 16)
- Edvard Førre Erfjord – programming (track 11)
- Henrik Michelsen – programming (track 11)
- Matias Monsen – cello (track 15)
- Askjell Solstrand – wurlitzer organ (track 13)
- Geoff Lawson – conductor (The Royal Philharmonic Orchestra) (track 13)
- The Royal Philharmonic Orchestra – orchestra (track 13)

=== Technical ===
- Aurora Aksnes – production (tracks 1, 4)
- Edvard Førre Erfjord – production, programming & recording (track 3)
- Henrik Michelsen – production, programming & recording (track 3)
- Magnus Åserud Skylstad – production, programming & recording (all tracks), mixing (all tracks)
- Nicolas Rebscher – production & programming (track 2)
- Odd Martin Skålnes – production, programming & recording (all tracks)
- Neil Comber – mixing (tracks 4, 5, 9, 11)
- Alex Wharton – mastering & engineering (all tracks)

=== Artwork ===
- Magnus Rakeng – artwork
- Kenny McCracken – photography

== Certifications ==
Certifications for Running with the Wolves
| Region | Certification | Certified units/sales |
|---|---|---|
| Norway (IFPI Norway) | Platinum | 20,000^{‡} |
^{‡} Sales+streaming figures based on certification alone.
