= Through the Eyes of a Child (Aurora song) =

2025 single by Aurora

- from "Adolescence" cover

Single by Aurora

from the album All My Demons Greeting Me as a Friend
- Released: 28 March 2025
- Length: 4:34
- Label: Decca; Glassnote
- Songwriters: Aurora Aksnes; Michelle Leonard; Alf Lund Godbolt
- Producers: Odd Martin Skålnes; Magnus Skylstad; Alf Lund Godbolt

Aurora singles chronology
"Starvation" (2024)	"Through the Eyes of a Child" (2025)	"The Flood" (2025)

Lyric video
- "Through the Eyes of a Child" on YouTube

"Through the Eyes of a Child" is a song by Norwegian singer-songwriter Aurora from her debut studio album, All My Demons Greeting Me as a Friend (2016). It was released on 28 March 2025, through Decca and Glassnote Records, as the seventh and final single from the album. The song was featured on Netflix TV series Adolescence.

== Background ==
Aurora released the single "Starvation" from her fifth studio album What Happened to the Heart?. She subsequently embarked on her sixth concert tour, What Happened to the Earth?, which spanned from 2024 to 2025. During the tour, her song "Through the Eyes of a Child" was featured in the Netflix series Adolescence, leading to its release as the seventh single from her debut studio album All My Demons Greeting Me as a Friend.

Aurora wrote "Through the Eyes of a Child" when she was 13 years old, the same age as the protagonist of Adolescence, giving the song a sense of youthful sincerity. In a social media post, the show's director, Philip Barantini, stated: "It was the one thing I would listen to when we were making the show. I knew very early on that I needed to use it at the end. It’s so haunting and powerful." Reflecting on the song’s renewed resonance, Aurora commented, "It’s a strange and wonderful thing to see people connecting with this song... I hope the song gives people something good. It was always written in the hope that it would find people and treat them kindly." She also expressed her gratitude, describing it as an honour to have her younger self's vocals featured in such a meaningful way. She praised the show as a deep, artistic work that invites reflection, contrasting it with the more surface-level content common today.

== Promotion ==
After its use in the Netflix series Adolescence, Aurora performed the song at the 2025 Spellemannprisen, and at the 2026 British Academy Television Awards.

== Composition ==
"Through the Eyes of a Child", the seventh track on the album, has been described as an "icily atmospheric" ballad that "showcases [a] lovely piano and voice".

== Critical reception ==
"Through the Eyes of a Child" has been described as a gentle, atmospheric ballad that conveys themes of innocence, comfort, and emotional sincerity. The song features minimal instrumentation, including piano, violin, and ambient sounds, which support Aurora's soft vocals and introspective lyrics. Critics have noted its calming and reflective quality, characterising it as a moment of solace amid the complexities of adult life and recent world events.

== Charts ==
Chart performance for "Through the Eyes of a Child"
Chart (2025)	Peak position
UK Singles Sales Chart (OCC)	45
UK Singles Downloads Chart (OCC)	42
