= Conqueror (Aurora song) =

2016 single by Aurora

Single by Aurora

from the album All My Demons Greeting Me as a Friend
- Written: 2013
- Released: 15 February 2016
- Recorded: 2015
- Genre: Scandipop; synth-pop; electropop
- Length: 3:27
- Label: Decca; Budde Music
- Songwriters: Aurora Aksnes; Geir Luedy; Magnus Skylstad; Odd Martin Bergjord Skålnes
- Producers: Odd Martin; Magnus Skylstad; Jeremy Wheatley

Aurora singles chronology
"Half the World Away" (2015)	"Conqueror" (2016)	"I Went Too Far" (2016)

Music video
- "Conqueror" on YouTube

"Conqueror" is a song by Aurora and the fifth single from All My Demons Greeting Me as a Friend. It was written by Aurora, Geir Luedy, Odd Martin Skålnes and Magnus Skylstad and produced by Skålnes, Skylstad and Jeremy Wheatley. On January 15, 2016, the song was officially released worldwide.

== Background and composition ==
"Conqueror" is a Scandipop, synth-pop, and electropop song with "clattering drum beats building towards a euphoric chorus". Aurora wrote this song in 2013 with some of her band members.

She said: "This song is a rather strange one. It's an important contrast to all the other songs on my album - it's actually a bit happy! I wrote it with some of my band members during 2013 once. It was just for fun, we didn't even know if anything good would come out it!"

"'Conqueror' is about a world [that] is kind of falling apart around you, and you're looking for a conqueror to save you. But you're looking for the conqueror in someone else, which I think is [something] you should not do. You should find the conqueror in yourself first, and be your own hero. If you stand strong, then you will stand for a bit longer."

In the documentary Once Aurora, she expressed her dislike for the song due to its overly pop leanings. However, in a 2021 interview with NME, she stated, "I like the song more now, but haven't played it live for five years. I stopped after 2016 and said, 'I'm never going to play this again – ever!'" She then said, "When I start touring again, I will start playing it again – because it is very fun. I just needed a five-year break from the song."

== Music video ==
A music video for the song was released on February 16, 2016. It was directed by Kenny McCracken.

== Charts ==
Chart performance for "Conqueror"
Chart (2016)	Peak position
Canada Rock (Billboard)	49
Mexico Ingles Airplay (Billboard)	47
Norway Digital Song Sales (Billboard)	8
US Alternative Airplay (Billboard)	32
