= The Seed (Aurora song) =

2019 single by Aurora

Single by Aurora

from the album A Different Kind of Human (Step 2)
- Released: 5 April 2019
- Length: 4:26
- Label: Decca; Glassnote
- Songwriter(s): Aurora Aksnes; Michelle Leonard; Nicolas Rebscher
- Producer(s): Aurora

Aurora singles chronology
"Animal" (2019)	"The Seed" (2019)	"The River" (2019)

Music video
- "The Seed" on YouTube

"The Seed" is a song by Norwegian singer-songwriter Aurora for her third studio album, A Different Kind of Human (Step 2) (2019). It was released on 5 April 2019, through Decca and Glassnote, as the second single from the album.

== Background ==
"The Seed" was inspired by the Native American proverb, "When the last tree is cut down, the last fish eaten, and the last stream poisoned, you will realise that you cannot eat money." Aurora wrote the song as a call to action for environmental awareness, emphasising the urgency of protecting nature. She expressed her desire for young people to channel their emotions into meaningful activism, describing the track as "a cry for Mother Earth."

In 2024, Aurora released a live version of "The Seed", recorded during her sold-out performance at the Royal Albert Hall in London as part of her What Happened to the Earth? tour. The rendition featured organist Anna Lapwood, with Aurora describing the collaboration as "absolute bliss", while Lapwood noted that the experience felt as if "the music took everyone in the room to a new dimension." The live release was prompted by the overwhelmingly positive response from fans and the emotional impact of the performance.

== Critical reception ==
"The Seed" received positive reviews from music critics, with praise for its powerful message and atmospheric production. A Bit of Pop Music highlighted the song's urgent environmental theme, noting that Aurora's fascination with nature is more explicitly expressed in this track. The review emphasised the song’s stark warning about humanity’s treatment of the Earth, particularly through the haunting lyric "When the last tree has fallen and the rivers are poisoned, you cannot eat money." The publication also praised the song’s rich instrumentation, describing how the ominous drums, piano, and violin enhance its dramatic effect. The dark, intense production of the chorus was noted as particularly effective in conveying Aurora's message. The review concluded by suggesting that "The Seed" should be used in campaigns advocating for climate action and environmental sustainability.

In a review for The Guardian, Michael Cragg compared "The Seed" to the drum-heavy, theatrical sound of early Florence + the Machine, while noting that the track also incorporates a clanking industrial beat. He described the lyric "you cannot eat money"—inspired by an Indigenous American proverb—as the foundation of its festival-ready chorus.
