= Running with the Wolves (song) =

- Wolfwalkers edition cover

Single by Aurora

from the EP Running with the Wolves and the album All My Demons Greeting Me as a Friend
- Released: 20 April 2015
- Recorded: 2014–2015
- Genre: Scandipop; electropop
- Length: 3:14
- Label: Decca
- Songwriters: Aurora Aksnes; Michelle Leonard; Nicolas Rebscher
- Producers: Odd Martin Skålnes; Nicolas Rebscher; Magnus Skylstad

Aurora singles chronology
"Runaway" (2015)	"Running with the Wolves" (2015)	"Murder Song (5, 4, 3, 2, 1)" (2015)

Music video
- "Running with the Wolves" on YouTube

"Running with the Wolves" is the fourth single released by Aurora and the second single on Running with the Wolves and All My Demons Greeting Me as a Friend. It was written by Aurora, Michelle Leonard and Nicolas Rebscher and produced by Odd Martin Skålnes, Rebscher and Magnus Skylstad. On 20 April 2015, the song was officially released worldwide.

In 2020, as part of the Apple TV+ animated film Wolfwalkers, a newer version of the song was released, which is heard in the soundtrack and trailer. This version uses medieval Irish instruments as the backing music. The song was also used for the theme song for Wolfblood series 4–5, as well as Wolfblood Secrets in addition appearing on an episode of Teen Wolf (2011 TV series) and The Blacklist.

In 2016, the song received a Spellemann nomination for Song of the Year at the 2016 Spellemannprisen, which went to Kygo's "Stole the Show".

== Composition ==
"Running with the Wolves" is a Scandipop and electropop song. Aurora began writing the song at age 13, and continued writing it during a blood moon in 2014.

In an interview with The 405, she said: "I just imagined the moon turning all the people around the world into wild animals, running away from all the rules, all the materialism and technology. Just being a part of nature again, running free." She added:

The song is about having the animal instinct inside you come to life. Running with them, joining them – the instinct taking over, giving you freedom and making you forget about your human self and all things we humans keep around us in the modern society.

I think humans need to let go a bit more, shake their bodies more often, like the animals do ... It's a beautiful thing really.

Sometimes when you look at the world, and you see what we've done to it, the way many of us hurt the world we live in, innocent animals, even our own kind! And that kind of makes you want to follow the wolves instead. At least for one night.

In another interview with The Verge, Aurora mentions that she created and used various field recordings in the song, such as the sounds of a stick against dry leaves, walking, breathing, and the sound of her "hugging a tree, which had no sound, but it’s on the album".

== Music video ==
The music video for "Running with the Wolves", directed by James Alexandrou, was premiered through Vevo on 10 June 2015. The singer also released an acoustic version of the song through Vevo on 7 July 2015. This video was directed by Kenny McCracken.

== Charts ==
Chart performance for "Running with the Wolves"
Chart (2015)	Peak position
Germany (GfK)	72

== Certifications ==
Certifications for "Running with the Wolves"
Region	Certification	Certified units/sales
Brazil (Pro-Música Brasil)	Platinum	60,000^{‡}
United Kingdom (BPI)	Silver	200,000^{‡}
^{‡} Sales+streaming figures based on certification alone.
