= Murder Song (5, 4, 3, 2, 1) =

2015 single by Aurora

Single by Aurora

from the album All My Demons Greeting Me as a Friend
- Released: 25 August 2015
- Length: 3:20
- Label: Decca
- Songwriter(s): Aurora Aksnes; Odd Martin Skålnes
- Producer(s): Odd Martin; Magnus Skylstad

Aurora singles chronology
| "Running with the Wolves" (2015) | "Murder Song (5, 4, 3, 2, 1)" (2015) | "Half the World Away" (2015) |

Music video
- "Murder Song (5, 4, 3, 2, 1)" (Acoustic) on YouTube

Audio video
- "Murder Song (5, 4, 3, 2, 1)" (Studio Version) on YouTube

"Murder Song (5, 4, 3, 2, 1)" is a song by Norwegian singer-songwriter Aurora for her debut studio album, All My Demons Greeting Me as a Friend (2016). It was released on 25 August 2015, through Decca, as the third single from the album.

== Background ==
Aurora described "Murder Song (5, 4, 3, 2, 1)" as a complex narrative told from the victim's perspective, exploring themes of pain and acceptance. The song portrays a man who, believing he is doing the right thing, takes a woman's fate into his own hands. Overcome with love and sorrow, he breaks down in tears after committing the act.

Aurora has also expressed that songwriting serves as a form of therapy for her, helping her confront fears. She believes that avoiding pain turns it into a burden, whereas facing it allows for growth, likening the process to a stone transforming into a pearl.

== In popular culture ==
The song is featured twice in the penultimate episode of The Flash's third season, "Infantino Street".
