= I Went Too Far =

2016 single by Aurora

Single by Aurora

from the album All My Demons Greeting Me as a Friend
- Released: 5 July 2016
- Recorded: 2015
- Studio: Lydriket (Bergen); The Engine Room (London); Angel Recording Studios (London)
- Genre: Pop; synth-pop
- Length: 3:27 (album version); 3:57 (MK Remix)
- Label: Decca
- Songwriters: Aurora; Magnus Skylstad; Odd Martin Skålnes
- Producers: Magnus Skylstad; Odd Martin Skålnes; Jeremy Wheatley

Aurora singles chronology
"Conqueror" (2016)	"I Went Too Far" (2016)	"Home" (2016)

Music video
- "I Went Too Far" on YouTube

"I Went Too Far" is a song by Aurora and the sixth single from All My Demons Greeting Me as a Friend (2016). It was written by Aurora, Odd Martin Skålnes and Magnus Skylstad and produced by Magnus Skylstad, Odd Martin Skålnes and Jeremy Wheatley. On July 5, 2016 the song was officially released worldwide. A remix of the song by American DJ MK was released on 15 July 2016.

== Background and composition ==
The song is described to be a disco-inflected pop and synth-pop song. Aurora started writing this song when she was nine. She explained to the 405: "It's a reminder of how important it is to not give yourself away for anyone else's love. Way too many people tend to stay in relationships where they go through verbal and physical abuse. It's a huge issue that needs awareness."

In a BBC Radio 1 interview she said: "We sometimes go too far for the approval and love of someone else, when we should really just learn to love ourselves and that should be enough."

"When I was 9 I wrote most of this song. I watched someone brave and kind not demanding the respect and love they deserved.

Growing up, I realized these things happen all around us. And we need to learn to be kind to ourselves and demand to be treated right. We all have the chance to climb up the ladder."

== Music video ==
A music video for the song was released on 5 July 2016. It was directed by Arni & Kinski and was filmed in Iceland.

== Track listings ==
- Digital download
1. "I Went Too Far" – 3:27
- Digital download - MK Remix (Radio Version)
1. "I Went Too Far (MK Remix)" – 3:57
- Digital download - MK Remix (Extended Version)
1. "I Went Too Far (MK Extended Remix)" – 5:22

== Credits and personnel ==
Credits adapted from the liner notes of All My Demons Greeting Me as a Friend.

=== Recording and management ===
- Recorded at Lydriket (Bergen, Norway), The Engine Room (London, England) and Angel Recording Studios (London, England)
- Mixed at Lydriket and The Engine Room
- Mastered at Abbey Road Studios (London, England)
- Published by Ultra Music Publishing, Universal Music Publishing, Entertainment Distribution Company

=== Personnel ===
- Aurora Aksnes – vocals, piano
- Odd Martin Skålnes – synth, programming
- Magnus Åserud Skylstad – drums & percussion
- Pete Davis – keyboards & programming

== Charts ==
Chart performance for "I Went Too Far"
Chart (2016)	Peak position
US Hot Rock & Alternative Songs (Billboard)	15
