= A Different Kind of Human (Step 2) =

2019 studio album by Aurora

Studio album by Aurora
- Released: 7 June 2019
- Recorded: November 2018
- Genres: Pop; art pop; electropop
- Length: 40:04
- Labels: Decca; Glassnote
- Producers: Aurora; Magnus Skylstad; MyRiot; Asjkell Solstrand; Odd Martin; Mark Ralph; Toby Gad; Kill Dave

Aurora chronology
Infections of a Different Kind (Step 1) (2018)	A Different Kind of Human (Step 2) (2019)	The Gods We Can Touch (2022)

Singles from A Different Kind of Human
- 1. "Animal" Released: 24 January 2019; 2. "The Seed" Released: 5 April 2019; 3. "The River" Released: 10 May 2019

A Different Kind of Human (Step 2) is the third studio album by Norwegian singer-songwriter and record producer Aurora. It was released on 7 June 2019 by Decca and Glassnote Records. It succeeds the album's first and previous chapter Infections of a Different Kind (Step 1), which was released in September 2018. Aurora collaborated with producers including Magnus Skylstad, MyRiot, Askjell Solstrand, Odd Martin, Mark Ralph, Toby Gad, and Kill Dave during its recording. It has been categorised to be a pop, art pop, and electropop concept album.

== Background and production ==
My first album was a lot about looking inwards and working with your own demons, becoming a warrior for yourself. All in all, it's about becoming a warrior for the people that can't be a warrior for themselves yet, so that's why it's important that this album felt like it was sent to a different kind of human. It has this mix of the ancient and futuristic because we are in a very interesting time now, as humans; we are trying to learn how to live with the world, the technology, with us, and trying to balance it all in harmony.

— Aurora describing the concepts for A Different Kind of Human and the inspirations it took from her debut album.

On the same day of the release of Infections of a Different Kind (Step 1), Aurora confirmed in an interview with NME that Step 2 would be released either in 2019 or 2020. Months later, Aurora posted a photo with a text that said "Something is coming in 2019" in Morse code, which hinted that Step 2 would be set to be released in 2019.

On 24 December 2018, Aurora announced in an interview for Bergens Tidende that Step 2 is coming faster than expected, most likely because she and Magnus Skylstad had been in the studio for a very long time. A Different Kind of Human (Step 2) was recorded in November 2018 in a "tiny room", in which Aurora and Skylstad did not sleep until the album completion.

== Music and lyrics ==
A Different Kind of Human (Step 2) combines pop, art pop, and electropop, while drawing influences from Native American, African, Norwegian and Japanese folk music. The record has been described to be a concept album that tackles themes of ecological crisis that "aim at society's self-centred capitalistic apathy". Gigwise note the album as "cinematic, conceptual, electronic glory" record.

== Release and promotion ==
On 18 February 2019, Aurora announced that the title would not be under the assumed title of Infections of a Different Kind (Step 2), and it would have a different name. "It's kind of what I would hope for the music to do to us", Aurora said about Step 2's title. The tracklist was revealed on 5 April 2019. In a 2021 interview, she said that a third album in the series "is coming", but that "it's just not its time yet".

=== Singles ===
The album's first single, "Animal", was released on 24 January 2019 alongside a music video released the same day. At the end of March, "The Seed" was confirmed to be the second single from the project. Following the announcement, the album title and tracklist were revealed on 4 April 2019. On 10 May 2019, the song "The River" was released as the album's third and last single. It was followed by three promotional singles "A Different Kind of Human", released on 31 May 2019, "Apple Tree", and "Daydreamer", released on 14 August 2019 and 1 November 2019 respectively.

== Critical reception ==
Professional ratings
Aggregate scores
Source	Rating
AnyDecentMusic?	7.3/10
Metacritic	77/100
Review scores
Source	Rating
AllMusic	3.5/5 stars
Clash	7/10
Dork	4/5 stars
Gigwise	7/10 stars
The Guardian	4/5 stars
The Independent	3/5 stars
The Line of Best Fit	9/10
MusicOMH	4/5 stars
NME	4/5 stars
The Young Folks	9/10

At Metacritic, which assigns a weighted average score out of 100 to reviews and ratings from mainstream publications, A Different Kind of Human (Step 2) received an average score of 77, based on 7 reviews, indicating "generally favorable reviews".

AllMusic editor Marcy Donelson wrote that "while uneven, it's an album that sticks, both for its theatrical melodies and uncommon benevolence." Michael Cragg of The Guardian suggested that the album "would have benefited from its predecessor's [Infections of a Different Kind (Step 1)] brevity" and added that it "deserves wider attention." NME reviewer Andrew Trendell lauded the album's production, and message but commented that "Aurora's idiosyncrasies — which mostly set this album apart — sometimes also weigh it down." Clash's Malvika Padin highlighted that "Aurora consistently plays to her lyrical strength, as meaningful words [...] make a home within the listeners psyche."

== Commercial performance ==
A Different Kind of Human (Step 2) debuted at number four on the Norwegian VG-lista Topp 40 Album with first-week sales of 2,100 units, thus becoming Aurora's second top 5 record in the chart. In the United Kingdom, the record peaked at number #32 on the UK Albums Chart.

== Track listing ==
A Different Kind of Human (Step II) track listing
No.	Title	Writer(s)	Producer(s)	Length
1.	"The River"	Aurora Aksnes; Odd Martin Skalnes; Magnus Skylstad	Aurora; Skylstad; Odd Martin^{[a]}; Mark Ralph^{[b]}	3:37
2.	"Animal"	Aksnes; Toby Gad; David Dahlquist	Aurora; Skylstad; Askjell Solstrand; Kill Dave; MyRiot; Gad	3:35
3.	"Dance on the Moon"	Aksnes; Guy Sigsworth	Aurora; MyRiot^{[a]}; Solstrand^{[a]}; Skylstad^{[b]}	3:36
4.	"Daydreamer"	Aksnes; Peter Wade Keusch	Aurora; MyRiot^{[a]}; Solstrand^{[a]}	3:39
5.	"Hunger"	Aksnes; Fiona Bevan	Aurora; Skylstad	2:46
6.	"Soulless Creatures"	Aksnes; Timothy Bran; Roy Kerr	Aurora; MyRiot^{[a]}	5:02
7.	"In Bottles"	Aksnes; Skylstad	Aurora; MyRiot^{[a]}; Solstrand^{[a]}; Skylstad^{[b]}	3:58
8.	"A Different Kind of Human"	Aksnes	Aurora; Solstrand; Skylstad^{[b]}	4:01
9.	"Apple Tree"	Aksnes; Skalnes; Skylstad	Aurora; Skylstad; Odd Martin^{[a]}	3:08
10.	"The Seed"	Aksnes; Michelle Leonard; Nicolas Rebscher	Aurora; MyRiot^{[a]}; Solstrand^{[a]}	4:26
11.	"Mothership"	Aksnes; Solstrand	Aurora; Solstrand	2:16
Total length:				40:04

=== Notes ===
- ^{^[a]} signifies a co-producer.
- ^{^[b]} signifies an additional producer.

== Charts ==
List of chart performance
Chart (2019)	Peak position
Australian Albums (ARIA)	52
Austrian Albums (Ö3 Austria)	66
Belgian Albums (Ultratop Flanders)	172
Czech Albums (ČNS IFPI)	98
German Albums (Offizielle Top 100)	58
Norwegian Albums (VG-lista)	4
Norwegian Vinyl Albums (IFPI Norge)	4
Scottish Albums (Official Charts)	34
Swiss Albums (Schweizer Hitparade)	54
UK Albums (Official Charts)	32
US Heatseekers Albums (Billboard)	5
US Independent Albums (Billboard)	21
US Top Album Sales (Billboard)	96

== Certifications ==
List of certifications and sales
Region	Certification	Certified units/sales
Norway (IFPI Norway)	Platinum	20,000^{‡}
United Kingdom	—	20,643
^{‡} Sales+streaming figures based on certification alone.

== Release history ==
List of release dates and formats
Region	Date	Version	Format	Label	Ref.
Various	7 June 2019	Standard	Cassette; CD; digital download; streaming	Decca; Glassnote	
Japan	16 September 2020	Bonus Track	CD	Universal	
