= Forgotten Love (song) =

2018 single by Aurora

Single by Aurora

from the album Infections of a Different Kind (Step 1)
- Released: 17 August 2018
- Length: 3:28
- Label: Decca; Glassnote
- Songwriter(s): Aurora Aksnes; Martin Sjølie
- Producer(s): MyRiot; Askjell Solstrand

Aurora singles chronology
"Queendom" (2018)	"Forgotten Love" (2018)	"Animal" (2019)

Audio video
- "Forgotten Love" on YouTube

"Forgotten Love" is a song by Norwegian singer-songwriter Aurora for her second studio album, Infections of a Different Kind (Step 1) (2018). It was released on 5 April 2019, through Decca and Glassnote, as the second single and final single from the album.

== Background ==
"Forgotten Love" was produced by MyRiot, Askjell Solstrand and additional producer Magnus Skylstad. Aurora released the song as a follow-up to "Queendom" in 2018 while working on her second studio album. She described the song as highly personal yet open to interpretation, explaining that it was inspired by the realization that she had unconsciously moved forward after losing someone. Instead of feeling guilt, she found relief in being able to forget, considering it a beautiful aspect of healing.

== Music video ==
A music video was filmed but ultimately remained unreleased. However, brief clips from the video were featured in a short documentary about Bergen's music scene, in which Aurora appeared for an interview.

== Charts ==
Chart performance for "Forgotten Love"
Chart (2018)	Peak position
Norwegian Artist Singles (IFPI Norge)	22
