= Half the World Away =

1994 song by Oasis

Song by Oasis

from the album The Masterplan
- A-side: "Whatever"
- Released: 18 December 1994
- Recorded: October 1994
- Studio: The Congress House, Austin, Texas
- Genre: Britpop; acoustic rock
- Length: 4:21
- Label: Creation
- Songwriter: Noel Gallagher
- Producers: Owen Morris, Noel Gallagher

Lyric video
- "Half The World Away" on YouTube

"Half the World Away" is a song by British rock band Oasis. It is well known as the theme tune to the popular BBC sitcom The Royle Family.

The song was written by Oasis' lead guitarist Noel Gallagher, who also provides lead vocals. The song is set to acoustic guitar and keyboards, and the lyrics – much like "Rock 'n' Roll Star" – express a desire to leave a stagnant life in a boring city. The song is primarily in C major.

Recorded at The Congress House Studio, Austin, Texas, in October 1994, "Half the World Away" was first released as a B-side to "Whatever" on 18 December 1994, reaching number 3 in the UK charts.

In 1998 the song was included on The Masterplan, a collection of Oasis' best B-sides. The collection was a success, peaking at number 2 in the UK charts. The track is also included on Oasis' compilation album Stop the Clocks, which also reached number 2. The song reached number 56 in the UK charts in 2015 following the release of Aurora's cover version, marking their first top 100 song since the release of "Falling Down" in 2009.

During a Q & A session at Salford Lads' Club in October 2019, Gallagher revealed that the song was the favourite of the B-sides he had made.

== Background ==
Oasis' sound engineer Mark Coyle introduced the band to Burt Bacharach's song "This Guy's in Love with You". Coyle was in charge of musical intake while on tour, and this song was often played during his eclectic sets. Drummer Tony McCarroll pointed out that the song's drum shuffle could be adapted for one of Oasis' acoustic numbers. After a while "instead of adapting the drum shuffle, Noel seemed to have adapted the whole song and renamed it Half The World Away". Despite the input and being able to play the pattern well, McCarroll (along with the rest of the band) were invited to leave the studio for a break, but it turned out to be just an excuse so Gallagher could record the drum track himself.

Conversely, producer Owen Morris recalled the Congress House session as "very weird, very strange", as tensions between Gallagher and McCarroll reached a breaking point. Gallagher insulted McCarroll for taking six attempts to put down the drum track for "(It's Good) to Be Free", and Morris reported that Gallagher told McCarroll "You aren’t going near the drum kit on this one. Fuck off, right now" before recording "Half the World Away".

In interviews, Gallagher has admitted the tune to "Half the World Away" was adapted from "This Guy's in Love with You" by Bacharach and Hal David. He commented "It sounds exactly the same. I'm surprised he hasn't sued me yet!" Gallagher sang "This Guy's in Love with You" live in 1996 at a Burt Bacharach concert at the London Festival Hall while Bacharach accompanied him on piano and conducted the orchestra.

Some of the borrowing in the song is from Gallagher's own work: the line "My body feels young but my mind is very old" was adapted from the second line of the earlier song "Comin' On Strong" ("You said body was young but your mind was very old"), a song that would later itself be reworked by the Chemical Brothers as "Setting Sun", with Noel's vocals and lyrics retained.

In 2024, as part of the Definitely Maybe 30th Anniversary Tour, Liam performed the song live for the first time and it remained on the setlist throughout the tour. Starting with the Live '25 Tour, Noel resumed singing duties during an acoustic set while Liam temporarily leaves the stage, as the band did regularly when performing.

== Usage in The Royle Family ==
The song gained mass public exposure when it was selected by Caroline Aherne and Craig Cash to be the theme tune to their sitcom The Royle Family. The series revolved around the sitting room of a working-class family and was set in Manchester, the hometown of Oasis. Although it had modest beginnings, the series soon became popular and its theme became well known. The opening credits of the series edited together the first stanza of the first verse and the second stanza of the first chorus. The end credits, which would cut in immediately after the final joke of the episode – so as to add weight to it – began with the second stanza of the final chorus and would see the song through to the coda.

When Gallagher was originally approached about using an Oasis song for a series about a working-class family in Manchester, he suggested "Married with Children" and was confused when "Half the World Away" was chosen. On tour in America when The Royle Family was first screened, he claims the penny did not drop until he returned to the United Kingdom to find the series a huge success and viewed it, feeling the song was perfect for the series. He now claims not to think of "Half the World Away" as an Oasis song, but rather as the theme tune to The Royle Family. After Caroline Aherne died in July 2016, Noel Gallagher's High Flying Birds paid tribute to her by performing "Half the World Away" on a few occasions. In a similar vein, the first episode of Gogglebox broadcast after Aherne's death had "Half the World Away" play over the closing credits in her memory.

== Personnel ==
- Noel Gallagher – vocals, guitars, drums
- Paul Arthurs – electric piano
- Owen Morris – bass guitar

== Charts ==
Chart performance for "Half the World Away"
| Chart (2015) | Peak position |
|---|---|
| Ireland (IRMA) | 85 |
| Scotland Singles (Official Charts) | 22 |
| UK Singles (Official Charts) | 56 |
| UK Singles Downloads (Official Charts) | 29 |

== Certifications ==
Certifications for "Half the World Away"
| Region | Certification | Certified units/sales |
|---|---|---|
| United Kingdom (BPI) | 2× Platinum | 1,200,000^{‡} |
^{‡} Sales+streaming figures based on certification alone.

== Aurora version ==
"Half the World Away"

Single by Aurora

from the album All My Demons Greeting Me as a Friend (deluxe)
- Released: 6 November 2015
- Recorded: 2015
- Genre: Indie folk
- Length: 3:18
- Label: Decca
- Songwriter: Noel Gallagher
- Producers: Odd Martin; Magnus Skylstad

Aurora singles chronology
| "Murder Song (5, 4, 3, 2, 1)" (2015) | "Half the World Away" (2015) | "Conqueror" (2016) |

Music video
- "Half the World Away" on YouTube

Norwegian singer-songwriter Aurora released a cover version of the song. It was released on 6 November 2015 as a digital download. The song was selected as the soundtrack to the 2015 John Lewis Christmas advert. It was later accumulated for the deluxe version of her debut studio album All My Demons Greeting Me as a Friend, which was released on 11 March 2016.

=== Track listing ===
Digital download
| No. | Title | Length |
|---|---|---|
| 1. | "Half the World Away" | 3:18 |

=== Charts ===
Chart performance for "Half the World Away"
| Chart (2015) | Peak position |
|---|---|
| Euro Digital Song Sales (Billboard) | 16 |
| Ireland (IRMA) | 22 |
| Norway Digital Song Sales (Billboard) | 6 |
| Scotland Singles (Official Charts) | 4 |
| UK Singles (Official Charts) | 11 |

=== Release history ===
| Region | Date | Format | Label |
|---|---|---|---|
| United Kingdom | 6 November 2015 | Digital download | Decca Records |
