= Oslo Fagottkor =

Norwegian gay choir and show ensemble

Oslo Fagottkor is a Norwegian gay choir / show ensemble established in 2004 consisting of 35-40 gay men. The choir is known for its varied repertoire and at times humorous approach to interpreting old classics and newer contemporary hits. The choir is directed by Steinar Svendsen and conducted by Therese Kinzler Eriksen.

The choir's name literally means Oslo Bassoon Choir, a word-play on the similarity between the Norwegian word "fagott" (which means "bassoon") and the English slang term "faggot". The choir gives two regular concerts series every year, one in the summer usually held at the Chat Noir theatre and one at Christmas held usually at the Lilleborg Church in Oslo with record attendances. The summer concert traditionally invites a featured artist to perform with them. These have included Titten Tei, Eli Rygg, Jonas Gardell and Ingrid Bjørnov. The choir also appears during various events and functions and is also popular on national Norwegian TV outlets.

The choir also cooperates with featured artists. In spring 2008, their rendition for Stian Carstensen's "Ja, Noorge" was used as the theme song for the radio documentary series Å være norsk i detalj (meaning Being Norwegian in detail). It featured lead vocals of Bjarte Hjelmeland In summer 2009, the choir won the title for "Best Gay Choir" during World Outgames held in Copenhagen. In January 2010, they were nominated for category "Årets superhelt" and in April 2011, they performed "My Heart Is Yours" with Didrik Solli-Tangen during the intermission at the Norsk Melodi Grand Prix, the selection process for Eurovision Song Contest.

They also provided vocals on AURORA's albums "Infections of a Different Kind" and "A Different Kind of Human".

== Discography ==
=== Albums ===
- 2013: Godt jul og fagott nyttår (peaked at number 36 in VG-lista)
