= Øystein Skar =

- Born: 15 October 1985 (age 40); Vinstra, Oppland
- Origin: Norway
- Genres: Jazz
- Occupations: Musician, composer
- Instruments: Piano, keyboards
- Label: Propeller Recordings
- Formerly of: Highasakite
- Website: www.oysteinskar.com

Øystein Skar (born 15 October 1985 in Vinstra, Norway) is a Norwegian pianist and composer, known from bands like Cakewalk, Glow, Highasakite and Klang Kollektif.

== Career ==
Skar was raised in Vinstra, Oppland and started at the local music school at the age of twelve. He continued his piano studies on the Music program at the Vinstra high-school (2001), and started studying jazz-piano and improvisation under Misha Alperin at the Norwegian Academy of Music (2004). Prior to his settling in Oslo, Skar had performed classical piano for many years, but then the main focus moved to modern jazz, experimental music, avant-garde, rock, composing and electronic music with analogue synths and Lap-tops. But these days Øystein also performs more and more classical music as well, in addition to rock and pop in different bands, and as a solo pianist.

When on many of his tours as solo pianist or with different bands and other projects, he has played at festivals like Moldejazz, Jazz Nad Odra, the Murmansk jazzfestival, Oslo Jazzfestival, the Nordisk Allkunst, Lillehammer Jazzfestival, Ungjazz, On the edge of Wrong, Sounds of the Nordic countries, in addition to venues in Iceland, Northern Ireland, Republic of Ireland, Russia, South Africa, France, Poland, Netherlands, Sweden and Czech Republic.

Over the years Skar has collaborated with a series of musicians like Thomas Strønen, Jessica Slighter, Juhani Silvola, Erik Nylander, Petter Vågan, Erik Johannesen, Miroslaw "Carlos" Kaczmarczyk, Kim Johannesen, Trygve Seim, Camilla Granlien, Fredrik Kirkevold, Tor Haugerud, Thomas Hukkelberg, Bjarne Stensli, Edvard Askeland, Ivan Makedonov, Malte Winje, Morten Stene, Richard Nygaard, Mari Maurstad, Linda Øvrebø, Wojtek Staroniewicz, Peer Gynt Chamber Orchestra, Misha Alperin, Thomas T. Dahl, Ingeborg Dahlheim, Dennis Storhøi and many more, contributed on a series of albums, and won several prices.

Skar is also an active composer on commission, and he has written several music works for choir, percussion, dancers in addition to works for smaller ensembles. These works has been performed in various occasions. Now he works at Barratt Due Institute of Music in Oslo.

== Discography ==
With Sacred Harp

- 2009: Sacred Harp EP (The Perfect Hoax)

With Cakewalk

- 2012: Wired (Hubro Music)
- 2013: Transfixed'' (Hubro Music)

With Highasakite

- 2012: All That Floats Will Rain (Riot Factory)
- 2014: Silent Treatment (Propeller Recordings)

With Jessica Slighter

- 2012: Fear And The Framing (Hubro Music)

With Glow

- 2013: Glow (Playdate Records)

With Loud Jazz Band

- 2013: From The Distance: Live In Oslo (LJB Music Records)
