= Nordic popular music =

Music scene

Nordic popular music, also referred to as Scandinavian popular music, includes pop and rock music of the Nordic countries. The musical scene is known for its biggest bands like ABBA, Roxette, A-ha, Michael Learns to Rock, Ace of Base, and Aqua. These are by far the biggest non-metal acts to come out of Sweden, Norway and Denmark.

The popular music of the Nordic countries exhibits great diversity. Denmark, Finland, Iceland, Norway and Sweden have all had successful domestic record industries for many years. Because the Baltic countries of Estonia, Latvia and Lithuania were under Soviet control for much of the 20th century, when recording technology and popular music spread around the world, those three countries have a more tenuous connection with the popular industries of Finland, Sweden and the rest. However, since the fall of the Soviet Union, Western popular music in general has gained audiences in the Baltic states; this includes popular music from the other Nordic nations, as well as the United Kingdom, United States and elsewhere.

The Nordic metal scene is highly visible compared to other genres from the region. Many big names such as Dimmu Borgir, Lordi, Mercyful Fate, Blind Channel, Skálmöld, Hamferð, Mnemic, Opeth, Meshuggah, Children of Bodom, Amon Amarth, Lamori from Åland and to an extent Estonia's Metsatöll—if considering Estonia as Nordic, hail from Nordic nations. Nordic or Scandinavian metal bands have had a long and lasting influence on the metal subculture alongside their counterparts in Great Britain and The United States.

== Nordic number-one hits on the Billboard Hot 100 ==
Year	Artist	Song	Country
1974	Blue Swede	"Hooked on a Feeling"	Sweden
1977	ABBA	"Dancing Queen"	Sweden
1985	A-ha	"Take On Me"	Norway
1989	Roxette	"The Look"	Sweden
1989	Roxette	"Listen to Your Heart"	Sweden
1990	Roxette	"It Must Have Been Love"	Sweden
1991	Roxette	"Joyride"	Sweden
1994	Ace of Base	"The Sign"	Sweden

== Nordic number-one singles in the UK ==
Year	Artist	Song	Country
1974	ABBA	"Waterloo"	Sweden
1976	ABBA	"Mamma Mia"	Sweden
1976	ABBA	"Fernando"	Sweden
1976	ABBA	"Dancing Queen"	Sweden
1977	ABBA	"Knowing Me, Knowing You"	Sweden
1977	ABBA	"The Name of the Game"	Sweden
1978	ABBA	"Take a Chance on Me"	Sweden
1980	ABBA	"The Winner Takes It All"	Sweden
1980	ABBA	"Super Trouper"	Sweden
1986	A-ha	"The Sun Always Shines on TV"	Norway
1986	Europe	"The Final Countdown"	Sweden
1993	Ace of Base	"All That She Wants"	Sweden
1994	Whigfield	"Saturday Night"	Denmark
1995	Rednex	"Cotton Eye Joe"	Sweden
1995	Cher, Chrissie Hynde and Neneh Cherry with Eric Clapton	"Love Can Build a Bridge"	United States, Sweden and United Kingdom
1997	Aqua	"Barbie Girl"	Denmark / Norway
1998	Aqua	"Doctor Jones"	Denmark / Norway
1998	Aqua	"Turn Back Time"	Denmark / Norway
2000	A1	"Take on Me"	United Kingdom / Norway
2000	A1	"Same Old Brand New You"	United Kingdom / Norway
2004	Eric Prydz	"Call On Me"	Sweden
2005	Crazy Frog	"Axel F"	Sweden
2007	Robyn with Kleerup	"With Every Heartbeat"	Sweden
2008	Basshunter	"Now You're Gone"	Sweden
2012	Swedish House Mafia featuring John Martin	"Don't You Worry Child"	Sweden
2013	Avicii with Nicky Romero	"I Could Be the One"	Sweden and The Netherlands
2013	Icona Pop featuring Charli XCX	"I Love It"	Sweden and United Kingdom
2013	Avicii	"Wake Me Up"	Sweden
2014	Nico & Vinz	"Am I Wrong"	Norway
2016	Lukas Graham	"7 Years"	Denmark
2016	Major Lazer featuring Justin Bieber and MØ	"Cold Water"	USA, Canada and Denmark
2017	Clean Bandit featuring Zara Larsson	"Symphony"	United Kingdom and Sweden

== Some notable artists by country ==
=== Denmark ===
- Alphabeat
- Aqua
- Aura Dione
- Barcode Brothers
- Christopher Nissen
- Drew Sycamore
- Emmelie de Forest
- Infernal
- Junior Senior
- Kato
- Lukas Graham
- Martin Jensen
- Medina
- Michael Learns to Rock
- MØ
- Mercyful Fate
- Safri Duo
- Volbeat
- Whigfield

=== Faroe Islands ===
- Eivør
- Synarchy
- Týr

=== Finland ===
- Alma
- Anna Abreu
- Apocalyptica
- Benjamin Peltonen
- Blind Channel
- Bomfunk MC's
- Darude
- Hanoi Rocks
- HIM
- Isac Elliot
- Krista Siegfrieds
- Lordi
- Nightwish
- The Rasmus
- Sara Forsberg
- Sunrise Avenue
- LAMORI - from Åland

=== Iceland ===
- Björk
- Emilíana Torrini
- GusGus
- Kaleo
- Laufey
- Of Monsters and Men
- Sigur Rós
- Skalmold
- Svala

=== Norway ===
- A1
- A-ha
- Alan Walker
- Ane Brun
- Annie (singer)
- Astrid S
- Aurora
- Bel Canto
- Broiler
- Cashmere Cat
- Christine Guldbrandsen
- Dagny
- Dance with a Stranger
- Dimmu Borgir
- Donkeyboy
- D'Sound
- Espen Lind
- Fra Lippo Lippi
- Flunk
- Highasakite
- Ida Maria
- Ina Wroldsen
- Jarle Bernhoft
- Jenny Hval
- Katzenjammer
- Kaizers Orchestra
- Kate Havnevik
- KEiiNO
- Kings of Convenience
- Kygo
- Leaves' Eyes
- Lene Marlin
- Lemaitre
- Lido
- Madcon
- Mayhem
- Marcus & Martinus
- Maria Mena
- Marit Larsen
- Marion Raven
- Matoma
- M2M
- Moyka
- Nico & Vinz
- Röyksopp
- Sandra Lyng
- SeeB
- Secret Garden
- Sigrid
- Sirenia
- Sissel
- Susanne Sundfør
- Stargate
- Theatre of Tragedy
- Thomas Bergersen
- TNT
- Tungevaag & Raaban
- Turbonegro
- Tristania
- Wardruna
- Ylvis

By 2016, Norway had the 20th largest global music market. Currently four Norwegian artists have achieved a Top 10 placement on the Billboard Hot 100, including A-ha's "Take On Me" which went to 1st place in 1985, Ylvis' "The Fox" which went to 6th place in 2013, Nico & Vinz's "Am I Wrong" which went to 4th place in 2014, and Kygo's "It Ain't Me" which went to 10th place in 2017.

=== Sweden ===
- A*Teens
- ABBA
- Ace of Base
- ACT
- Agnes Carlsson
- Alesso
- Amon Amarth
- Army of Lovers
- Aronchupa
- Avicii
- Basshunter
- Benjamin Ingrosso
- Bladee
- Blue Swede
- Bosson
- Boy In Space
- Crazy Frog
- Da Buzz
- Darin
- Dr. Alban
- Eagle-Eye Cherry
- Elliphant
- Eric Prydz
- E-Type
- Europe
- First Aid Kit
- Felix Sandman
- Galantis
- Garmarna
- Ghost
- Hives
- Icona Pop
- John Martin
- Little Dragon
- Leila K
- Loreen
- Lykke Li
- Meja
- Mohombi
- Miike Snow
- Miss Li
- Neneh Cherry
- Opeth
- Otto Knows
- Play
- Rednex
- Roxette
- Robyn
- Sabaton
- Seinabo Sey
- September
- Sahara Hotnights
- Swedish House Mafia
- Teddybears
- The Cardigans
- Therion
- Tove Lo
- Tove Styrke
- Yung Lean
- Zara Larsson
