= Magnus Skylstad =

Norwegian musician and record producer

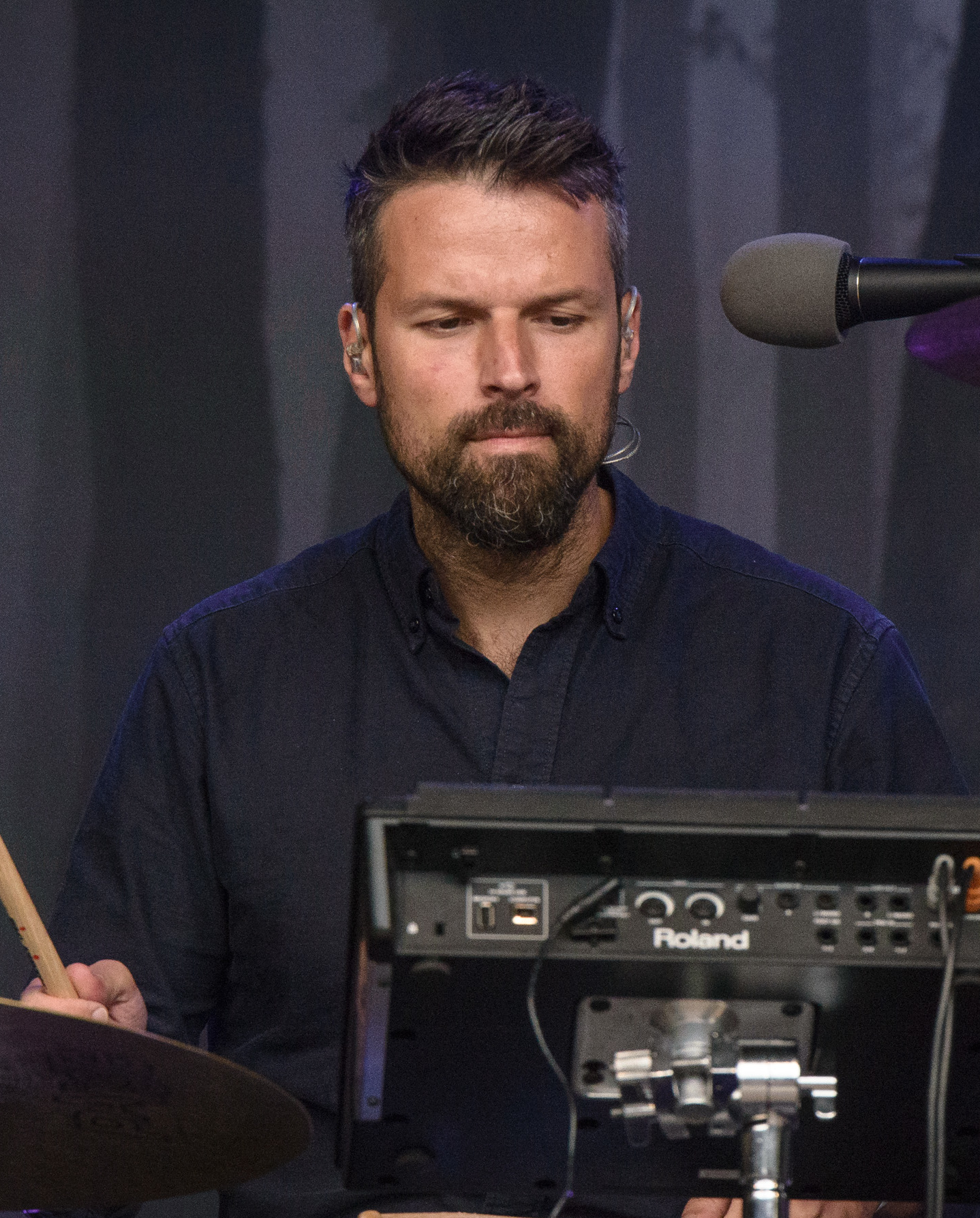
- Skylstad performing in 2016
- Born: Magnus Åserud Skylstad; June 17, 1983 (age 43); Bergen, Norway
- Citizenship: Norwegian
- Occupations: Record producer; songwriter; musician; engineer; backing vocalist
- Years active: 2011–present
- Musical career
- Genres: Electropop; folktronica
- Instruments: Drums; vocals
- Label: MADE Management
- Website: twitter.com/magnusskylstad

Magnus Åserud Skylstad (born 17 June 1983) is a Norwegian musician and record producer from Bergen. He began playing drums at around the age of fifteen years old. He currently is an affiliate of fellow Norwegian and singer-songwriter Aurora and performs as a percussionist, drummer, and occasional backing vocalist for her live band. He co-produced the 2026 full-length debut LP, ONCE UPON A TIME by PEGGY.

== Songwriting and production credits ==
Title	Year	Artist	Album	Songwriter	Producer			
Title	Year	Artist	Album	Songwriter	Primary	Secondary	Additional	Vocal
"Awakening"	2014	Aurora	Non-album single		check			
"Runaway"	2015	Aurora	All My Demons Greeting Me as a Friend	check	check			
"Running with the Wolves"	2015	Aurora	All My Demons Greeting Me as a Friend		check			
"In Boxes"	2015	Aurora	Running with the Wolves; EP		check			
"Little Boy in the Grass"	2015	Aurora	Running with the Wolves; EP	check	check			
"Murder Song (5, 4, 3, 2, 1)"	2015	Aurora	All My Demons Greeting Me as a Friend		check			
"Half the World Away"	2015	Aurora	All My Demons Greeting Me as a Friend		check			
"Conqueror"	2016	Aurora	All My Demons Greeting Me as a Friend	check	check			
"Lucky"	2016	Aurora	All My Demons Greeting Me as a Friend		check			
"Winter Bird"	2016	Aurora	All My Demons Greeting Me as a Friend		check			
"I Went Too Far"	2016	Aurora	All My Demons Greeting Me as a Friend	check	check			
"Through the Eyes of a Child"	2016	Aurora	All My Demons Greeting Me as a Friend		check			
"Warrior"	2016	Aurora	All My Demons Greeting Me as a Friend	check	check			
"Home"	2016	Aurora	All My Demons Greeting Me as a Friend		check			
"Under the Water"	2016	Aurora	All My Demons Greeting Me as a Friend		check			
"Black Water Lilies"	2016	Aurora	All My Demons Greeting Me as a Friend	check	check			
"Nature Boy"	2016	Aurora	All My Demons Greeting Me as a Friend		check			
"In Bottles" (featuring Aurora)	2017	Kölsch	1989	check				
"Youth"	2018	Halie	Non-album single	check	check			
"Queendom"	2018	Aurora	Infections of a Different; Kind (Step 1)				check	
"Forgotten Love"	2018	Aurora	Infections of a Different; Kind (Step 1)				check	
"It Happened Quiet"	2018	Aurora	Infections of a Different; Kind (Step 1)				check	
"Soft Universe"	2018	Aurora	Infections of a Different; Kind (Step 1)				check	
"Animal"	2019	Aurora	A Different Kind of Human (Step 2)		check			
"The River"	2019	Aurora	A Different Kind of Human (Step 2)	check	check			
"A Different Kind of Human"	2019	Aurora	A Different Kind of Human (Step 2)				check	
"Dance on the Moon"	2019	Aurora	A Different Kind of Human (Step 2)				check	
"Hunger"	2019	Aurora	A Different Kind of Human (Step 2)		check			
"In Bottles"	2019	Aurora	A Different Kind of Human (Step 2)	check			check	
"Apple Tree"	2019	Aurora	A Different Kind of Human (Step 2)	check	check			
