= Aurora discography =

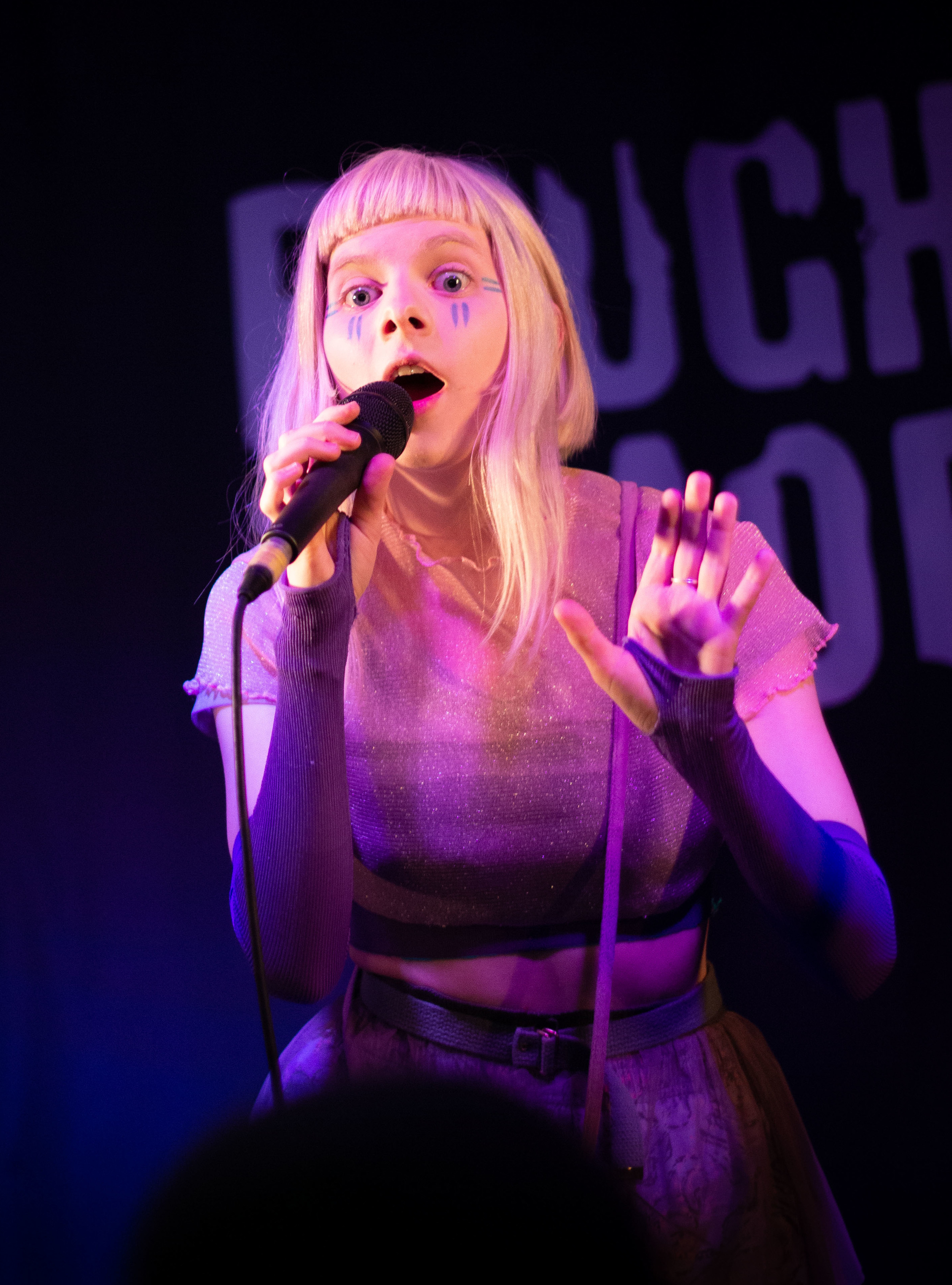
- Aurora performing in June 2019
- Studio albums: 5
- EPs: 7
- Compilation albums: 1
- Singles: 33
- Music videos: 24

Norwegian singer-songwriter Aurora has released five studio albums, one compilation album, one soundtrack album, seven extended plays (including five compilation EPs), 51 singles (including twelve as a featured artist), twelve promotional singles and 27 music videos.

Aurora released her debut extended play (EP), Running with the Wolves in May 2015 through Decca Records. A song from the EP, "Runaway", became a sleeper hit in 2021 charting in numerous single charts internationally, including the US Billboard Bubbling Under Hot 100 Singles. Later that year, she provided the backing track for the John Lewis Christmas advert, singing a cover of the Oasis song "Half the World Away", which reached number 11 in the UK. In March 2016, Aurora released her debut studio album All My Demons Greeting Me as a Friend, which included previous singles "Runaway", "Running with the Wolves" and "Half the World Away". It charted in various European countries and earned platinum certification two times in Norway. It was preceded by four additional singles: "Murder Song (5, 4, 3, 2, 1)", "Conqueror", and "I Went Too Far".

In 2018, she released her second studio album Infections of a Different Kind (Step 1), which spawned the singles "Queendom" and "Forgotten Love". Aurora's follow-up album, A Different Kind of Human (Step 2), was released in June 2019. The single "Apple Tree" saw minor chart success as a remix. As of July 2021, Aurora has sold over 1 million album-equivalent units worldwide.

== Albums ==
=== Studio albums ===
List of studio albums, with selected chart positions, sales figures, and certifications
Title	Details	Peak chart positions										Sales	Certifications
Title	Details	NOR	AUS	AUT	BEL (FL)	GER	NLD	SCO	SWI	UK	US	Sales	Certifications
All My Demons Greeting Me as a Friend	Released: 11 March 2016; Label: Decca, Glassnote; Formats: CD, LP, digital download, streaming	1	51	50	40	24	17	30	41	28	150	UK: 73,383 (Note: UK sales figures for All My Demons Greeting Me as a Friend as of June 2024.); WW: 500,000 (Note: Worldwide sales figures for All My Demons Greeting Me as a Friend as of September 2018.)	IFPI NOR: 2× Platinum; BPI: Silver; IFPI DEN: Gold; RMNZ: Gold
Infections of a Different Kind (Step 1)	Released: 28 September 2018; Label: Decca, Glassnote; Formats: CD, LP, cassette, digital download, streaming	7	—	—	—	—	191	80	—	—	—	UK: 11,886 (Note: UK sales figures for Infections of a Different Kind (Step 1) as of June 2024.)	IFPI NOR: Platinum
A Different Kind of Human (Step 2)	Released: 7 June 2019; Label: Decca, Glassnote; Formats: CD, LP, cassette, digital download, streaming	4	52	66	172	58	—	34	54	32	— (Note: A Different Kind of Human (Step 2) did not enter the US Billboard 200, but peaked at number 96 on the Top Album Sales chart.)	UK: 20,643 (Note: UK sales figures for A Different Kind of Human (Step 2) as of June 2024.)	IFPI NOR: Platinum
The Gods We Can Touch	Released: 21 January 2022; Label: Decca, Glassnote; Formats: CD, LP, cassette, digital download, streaming	1	100	24	25	11	28	7	16	8	— (Note: The Gods We Can Touch did not enter the US Billboard 200, but peaked at number 56 on the Current Album Sales chart.)	UK: 24,220 (Note: UK sales figures for The Gods We Can Touch as of June 2024.)	
What Happened to the Heart?	Released: 7 June 2024; Label: Decca, Glassnote, Petroleum; Formats: CD, LP, digital download, streaming	5	— (Note: What Happened to the Heart? did not enter the Australian ARIA Albums chart, but peaked at number 13 on the ARIA Hitseekers Albums chart.)	36	15	10	9	4	81	8	—	UK: 7,023 (Note: UK sales figures for What Happened to the Heart? as of June 2024.)	
"—" denotes a recording that did not chart or was not released in that territory.

=== Compilation albums ===
List of compilation albums
Title	Description
Infections of a Different Kind of Human	Released: 25 February 2022; Label: Glassnote, AWAL; Formats: CD, LP, cassette, digital download

=== Soundtrack albums ===
List of soundtrack albums
Title	Description
Sky: Concert in the Light	Released: 8 December 2022; Label: Decca; Formats: Streaming, digital download

== Extended plays ==
List of extended plays, with selected certifications
Title	Details	Certifications
Running with the Wolves	Released: 4 May 2015; Label: Decca; Formats: LP, digital download, streaming	IFPI NOR: Platinum
Room 17 5 August 2015	Released: 8 May 2015; Label: Daytrotter Studio; Format: Digital download	

=== Compilation extended plays ===
List of compilation extended plays
Title	Description
For the Humans Who Take Long Walks In the Forest	Released: 4 February 2021; Label: Glassnote, AWAL; Formats: Digital download, streaming
Music for the Fellow Witches Out There	Released: 11 February 2021; Label: Glassnote, AWAL; Formats: Digital download, streaming
Music for the Free Spirits	Released: 18 February 2021; Label: Glassnote, AWAL; Formats: Digital download, streaming
Stories	Released: 25 February 2021; Label: Glassnote, AWAL; Formats: Digital download, streaming
For the Metal People	Released: 4 March 2021; Label: Glassnote, AWAL; Formats: Digital download, streaming

== Singles ==
=== As lead artist ===
List of singles as lead artist, with selected chart positions and certifications, showing year released and album name
Title	Year	Peak chart positions										Certifications	Album
Title	Year	NOR	AUS	BEL (FL) Tip	CAN	GER	IRL	NLD	SWI	UK	US	Certifications	Album
"Awakening" (Note: "Awakening" is also included on the vinyl edition of the EP Running with the Wolves.)	2013	—	—	—	—	—	—	—	—	—	—		Non-album singles
"Under Stars" (Note: "Under Stars" is also included on the vinyl edition of the EP Running with the Wolves.)	2014	—	—	—	—	—	—	—	—	—	—		Non-album singles
"Runaway" (Note: "Runaway" is also included in the EP Running with the Wolves.)	2015	14	30	2	39	30	21	53	21	25	— (Note: "Runaway" did not enter the Billboard Hot 100, but peaked at number one on the Bubbling Under Hot 100 chart.)	IFPI NOR: Platinum; BPI: Platinum; BVMI: Gold; MC: Platinum; RIAA: Platinum; PMB: Diamond	All My Demons Greeting; Me as a Friend
"Running with the Wolves" (Note: "Running with the Wolves" is also included in the EP Running with the Wolves.)	2015	—	—	—	—	72	—	—	—	—	—	IFPI NOR: Platinum; PMB: Platinum; BPI: Silver	All My Demons Greeting; Me as a Friend
"Murder Song (5, 4, 3, 2, 1)"	2015	—	—	—	—	—	—	—	—	—	—	PMB: Gold	All My Demons Greeting; Me as a Friend
"Half the World Away" (Note: "Half the World Away" appears on the deluxe edition of All My Demons Greeting Me as a Friend.)	2015	— (Note: "Half the World Away" did not enter the Norwegian Singles chart, but peaked at number six on the Billboard Digital Song Sales chart.)	—	—	—	—	22	—	—	11	—	IFPI NOR: Gold; BPI: Gold	All My Demons Greeting; Me as a Friend
"Conqueror"	2016	— (Note: "Conqueror" did not enter the Norwegian Singles chart, but peaked at number eight on the Billboard Digital Song Sales chart.)	—	—	—	—	—	—	—	—	—	IFPI NOR: Platinum	All My Demons Greeting; Me as a Friend
"I Went Too Far"	2016	—	—	—	—	—	—	—	—	—	—	IFPI NOR: Gold	All My Demons Greeting; Me as a Friend
"Queendom"	2018	—	—	—	—	—	—	—	—	—	—	PMB: Gold	Infections of a Different; Kind (Step 1)
"Forgotten Love"	2018	— (Note: "Forgotten Love" did not enter the Norwegian Singles chart, but peaked at number 22 on the IFPI Norwegian Artist Singles chart.)	—	—	—	—	—	—	—	—	—	PMB: Gold	Infections of a Different; Kind (Step 1)
"Animal"	2019	— (Note: "Animal" did not enter the Norwegian Singles chart, but peaked at number 21 on the IFPI Norwegian Artist Singles chart.)	—	—	—	—	—	—	—	—	—		A Different Kind of Human (Step 2)
"The Seed"	2019	—	—	—	—	—	—	—	—	—	—	PMB: Gold	A Different Kind of Human (Step 2)
"The River"	2019	—	—	—	—	—	—	—	—	—	—	PMB: Gold	A Different Kind of Human (Step 2)
"Into the Unknown" (with Idina Menzel)	2019	—	—	15	39	—	31	—	—	19	46	BPI: Platinum; MC: Platinum; RIAA: 4× Platinum	Frozen II (Soundtrack)
"Exist for Love"	2020	—	—	—	—	—	—	—	—	—	—	PMB: Gold	The Gods We Can Touch
"The Secret Garden"	2020	—	—	—	—	—	—	—	—	—	—		The Secret Garden OST
"Stjernestøv"	2020	17	—	—	—	—	—	—	—	—	—		Stjernestøv
"Cure for Me"	2021	—	—	—	—	—	—	—	—	—	—	PMB: Platinum	The Gods We Can Touch
"Giving In to the Love"	2021	—	—	—	—	—	—	—	—	—	—		The Gods We Can Touch
"Heathens"	2021	—	—	—	—	—	—	—	—	—	—		The Gods We Can Touch
"A Dangerous Thing"	2022	—	—	—	—	—	—	—	—	—	—		The Gods We Can Touch
"A Temporary High"	2022	—	—	—	—	—	—	—	—	—	—		The Gods We Can Touch
"The Woman I Am" (Note: "The Woman I Am" first appeared as an album track from the vinyl edition of The Gods We Can Touch before its single release. It was later included on the Spotify and Japanese special editions of the album.)	2022	—	—	—	—	—	—	—	—	—	—		The Gods We Can Touch
"Storm" (Note: The English version of "Storm" was later included on the Japanese special edition of The Gods We Can Touch.) (with Wu Qing-feng)	2022	—	—	—	—	—	—	—	—	—	—		L'Après-midi d'un faune
"The Devil Is Human" (Note: "The Devil Is Human" first appeared as an album track from the vinyl edition of The Gods We Can Touch before its single release. It was later included on the Japanese special edition of the album.)	2022	—	—	—	—	—	—	—	—	—	—		The Gods We Can Touch
"A Potion for Love" (Note: "A Potion For Love" first appeared as the B-side of the "Cure For Me" vinyl before its single release. It was later included on the Japanese special edition of The Gods We Can Touch.)	2022	—	—	—	—	—	—	—	—	—	—		Non-album single
"Your Blood"	2023	—	—	—	—	—	—	—	—	—	—		What Happened to the Heart?
"The Conflict of the Mind"	2024	—	—	—	—	—	—	—	—	—	—		What Happened to the Heart?
"Some Type of Skin"	2024	—	—	—	—	—	—	—	—	—	—		What Happened to the Heart?
"Starvation"	2024	—	—	—	—	—	—	—	—	—	—		What Happened to the Heart?
"Through the Eyes of a Child"	2025	—	—	—	—	—	—	—	—	—	—		All My Demons Greeting; Me as a Friend
"The Flood" (Note: "The Flood" only appears on the deluxe edition of What Happened to the Heart?.)	2025	—	—	—	—	—	—	—	—	—	—		What Happened to the Heart?
"All My Demons Greeting Me as a Friend" (Note: "All My Demons Greeting Me as a Friend" only appears on the 'Moth Tapes' edition of All My Demons Greeting Me as a Friend.)	2026	—	—	—	—	—	—	—	—	—	—		All My Demons Greeting; Me as a Friend
"—" denotes a recording that did not chart or was not released in that territory.

=== As featured artist ===
List of singles as featured artist, with selected chart positions, showing year released and album name
Title	Year	Peak chart positions			Album
Title	Year	UK	UK Rock	NZ Hot	Album
"Home" (Icarus featuring Aurora)	2016	—	—	—	Non-album single
"In Bottles" (Note: "In Bottles" is a remixed version of the song of the same name included in A Different Kind of Human (Step 2).) (Kölsch featuring Aurora)	2017	—	—	—	1989
"Ascension" (Atella featuring Aurora)	2018	—	—	—	Beacon One EP
"To Be Loved" (Askjell featuring Aurora)	2019	—	—	—	To Be Loved
"Cynical Mind" (Gundelach featuring Aurora)	2020	—	—	—	My Frail Body
"Sofia" (Askjell featuring Iris and Aurora)	2021	—	—	—	Everything Will Be Ok
"Paramour" (Sub Urban featuring Aurora)	2021	—	—	—	Hive
"Alone in the Night" (Sondre Lerche featuring Aurora)	2022	—	—	—	Avatars of Love
"The Frozen Planet" (Hans Zimmer, Adam Lukas & James Everingham for Bleeding Fingers Music featuring Aurora)	2022	—	—	—	Frozen Planet II (Original Television Soundtrack)
"Butterflies" (Tom Odell featuring Aurora)	2023	—	—	—	Non-album single
"Bring Back the Color" (San Holo featuring Aurora)	2023	—	—	—	Existential Dance Music
"My Sails Are Set" (Sonya Belousova and Giona Ostinelli featuring Aurora)	2023	—	—	—	One Piece (2023 Soundtrack)
"Limousine" (Bring Me the Horizon featuring Aurora)	2024	57	7	17	Post Human: Nex Gen
"Nod-Krai" (HOYO-MiX featuring Aurora)	2025	—	—	—	Genshin Impact - Outside It Is Growing Dark (Original Game Soundtrack)
"Southern Star" (Leif Vollebekk featuring Aurora)	2025	—	—	—	Non-album single
"—" denotes a release that did not chart or was not issued in that region.

=== Promotional singles ===
List of promotional singles, with selected certifications, showing year released and album name
Title	Year	Certifications	Album
"Puppet" (Note: Credited as Aurora Aksnes.)	2012		Non-album promotional single
"Warrior"	2016	PMB: Platinum	All My Demons Greeting Me As A Friend
"Scarborough Fair"	2018	PMB: Gold	Deus Salve o Rei — Música Original de Alexandre de Faria
"A Different Kind of Human"	2019		A Different Kind of Human (Step 2)
"Apple Tree"	2019		A Different Kind of Human (Step 2)
"Daydreamer"	2019		A Different Kind of Human (Step 2)
"Walking in the Air"	2019		Non-album promotional singles
"Into the Unknown" (solo version)	2020		Non-album promotional singles
"Thank U"	2020		Goodnight Songs for Rebel Girls
"Midas Touch"	2021		Hanna OST
"Everything Matters" (featuring Pomme)	2022	SNEP: Gold	The Gods We Can Touch
"Hunting Shadows" (Note: "Hunting Shadows" was later included on the Japanese special edition of The Gods We Can Touch.)	2022		Assassin's Creed: 15th Anniversary
"Animal Soul"	2024		Senua's Saga: Hellblade II
"To Be Alright"	2024		What Happened to the Heart?
"A Rock Somewhere / The Seed" (with Jacob Collier)	2025		Non-album single
"You Can't Run from Yourself"	2025		Kaiju No. 8 (Season 2)
"A Place to Call Home"	2026		World of Warcraft: Midnight
"Morning Shall Come" (with Bear McCreary)	2026		The Lord of the Rings: The Rings of Power

== Guest appearances ==
List of non-single guest appearances, with other performing artists, showing year released and album name
Title	Year	Other artist(s)	Album
"Her"	2014	Bunny Suit	The Mud Here Has Memories
"Born Screaming / Die Quiet"	2014	Bunny Suit	The Mud Here Has Memories
"Life on Mars"	2016	—N/a	Girls Vol. 3 (Music from the HBO Original Series)
"Ascension"	2018	Atella	Beacon One EP
"Baby Mine" (Note: Trailer only, not released for sale or streaming.)	2018	—N/a	Dumbo (Original Motion Picture Soundtrack)
"Pink Moon"	2023	—N/a	The Endless Coloured Ways: The Songs of Nick Drake

== Songwriting credits ==
indicates an un-credited lead vocal contribution.

Year	Artist	Album	Song	Co-written with
2015	Lena	Crystal Sky	"In the Light"	Ian Barter, Norma Jean Martine, Katrina Noorbergen, Laila Samuelsen
2016	Travis	Everything at Once	"3 Miles High"	Fran Healy
2019	The Chemical Brothers	No Geography	"Eve of Destruction"	Edward Simons, Thomas Rowlands, James Calloway, Leroy Jackson Jr., Nene
2019	The Chemical Brothers	No Geography	"Bango"	Edward Simons, Thomas Rowlands
2019	The Chemical Brothers	No Geography	"The Universe Sent Me"	Edward Simons, Thomas Rowlands

== Music videos ==
List of music videos, showing year released and directors
Title	Year	Director(s)	Ref.
"Runaway"	2015	Kenny McCracken	
"Running with the Wolves"	2015	James Alexandrou (Scratch)	
"Murder Song (5, 4, 3, 2, 1)"	2015	Kenny McCracken	
"Half the World Away"	2015	Kenny McCracken	
"Conqueror"	2016	Kenny McCracken	
"Home" (Icarus featuring Aurora)	2016	Jackson Ducasse; Grace Lambert	
"I Went Too Far"	2016	Arni & Kinski	
"Winter Bird"	2016	Simon Thirlaway	
"Scarborough Fair"	2018	Ricardo Spencer	
"Queendom"	2018	Kinga Burza	
"Animal"	2019	Tim Mattia	
"The Seed"	2019	Michael Hali	
"The River"	2019	Nick Walters	
"Eve of Destruction" (The Chemical Brothers featuring Aurora)	2019	Marcus Lyall; Adam Smith	
"Apple Tree"	2019	Rianne White	
"To Be Loved" (Askjell featuring Aurora)	2019	Sophia + Robert	
"Exist for Love"	2020	Aurora	
"Daydreamer"	2020	Unknown	
"Stjernestøv"	2020	Karianne Lund; Ida sagmo Tvedte	
"Sofia" (Askjell featuring Iris and Aurora)	2021	Unknown	
"Cure for Me"	2021	Sigurd Fossen; Aurora	
"Giving in to the Love"	2021	Sigurd Fossen	
"Paramour" (Sub Urban featuring Aurora)	2021	Axel Kabundji	
"A Temporary High"	2022	Sigurd Fossen	
"Alone in the Night" (Sondre Lerche featuring Aurora)	2022	William Glandberger	
"Storm (Original Version)" (Qing Feng-Wu and Aurora)	2022	Sigurd Fossen	
"Storm (English Version)" (Qing Feng-Wu and Aurora)	2022	Sigurd Fossen	
"Butterflies" (Tom Odell featuring Aurora)	2023	Simon Lane	
"Your Blood"	2023	Kaveh Nabatian	
"The Conflict of the Mind"	2024	Kaveh Nabatian	
"Some Type of Skin"	2024	Kaveh Nabatian	
"Ring the Alarm"	2025	Adam Smith	
"Come Closer"	2026	Adam Smith	
"Somewhere Else"	2026	Adam Smith	
"I Drink the Light"	2026	Adam Smith	
