= The Gods We Can Touch Tour =

2022–23 concert tour by Aurora

- Tour by Aurora
- Poster for the Asian leg
- Location: Asia; Australia; Europe; Latin America; North America
- Associated album: The Gods We Can Touch
- Start date: 27 March 2022
- End date: 9 September 2023
- Legs: 7
- No. of shows: 113
- Supporting acts: Sub Urban; Metteson; Sei Selina; Thea Wang; Blusher; Hannah Storm
- Attendance: 97,964 (38 shows)
- Box office: $7.6 million

Aurora concert chronology
- 2018–19 tour; The Gods We Can Touch Tour (2022–23); What Happened to the Earth? (2024–25)

The Gods We Can Touch Tour was the third concert tour by Norwegian singer and songwriter Aurora, undertaken in support of her fourth studio album, The Gods We Can Touch (2022). The tour started on 27 March 2022 at the Town Hall in Birmingham, and was concluded on 9 September 2023 at the Lollapalooza Berlin, spanning 113 shows in Europe, North America, Latin America, Asia, and Australia.

== Background ==
The European and also first leg of the tour was announced on 9 July 2021; general sale for the leg started on 16 July. On 14 October, Aurora was announced as headliner of the Øyafestivalen as part of the tour. The second leg of the tour visited North America in May and June 2022. Australia and New Zealand dates for the tour were announced on 26 August 2022. The fifth announced leg of the tour, with dates throughout Asia, was revealed on Aurora's social media accounts and official website on 18 November.

== Set list ==
This set list is representative of the show on 13 August 2022 in Oslo. It is not representative of all concerts for the duration of the tour.

1. "The Forbidden Fruits of Eden" (Intro with choir)
2. "Heathens"
3. "Blood in the Wine"
4. "Everything Matters"
5. "Churchyard"
6. "Warrior"
7. "Cure for Me"
8. "The River" (With choir)
9. "A Dangerous Thing" (Acoustic)
10. "Exist for Love" (Acoustic)
11. "It Happened Quiet" (Acoustic)
12. "A Different Kind of Human" (Note: "A Different Kind of Human" was cut short when an audience member experienced medical difficulties. Aurora stopped the show for a moment, leading the audience into humming a melody before continuing the show.)
13. "Runaway"
14. "Exhale Inhale"
15. "The Seed"
16. "A Temporary High"
17. "Queendom" (With choir)
18. "Running with the Wolves"

Encore

19. "Giving In to the Love" (With choir)

== Controversy ==
On 26 March 2023, as Aurora concluded her performance at Lollapalooza Brasil, her drummer, Sigmund Vestrheim, gestured with his hands in a manner that some social media users interpreted as a white supremacist dog whistle. Two days later, online examination of Vestrheim's Instagram revealed what some users claimed were additional instances of dog whistles and Nazi symbolism, including a drawing featuring the numbers 777 and a swastika. Aurora addressed the situation on her social media, stating that none of her band members support right-wing ideologies and denying that the drummer had any connection to hate movements. A few days later, Aurora announced that Vestrheim would be replaced for the upcoming shows of the tour in Mexico, citing safety concerns. In an interview with VG, Aurora confirmed that the drummer would be returning to the band and dismissed the accusations as "absurd," describing them as "nonsense and a waste of time."

== Tour dates ==
List of concerts, showing date, city, country, venue, opening acts, attendance and revenue
Date	City	Country	Venue	Opening Act	Attendance	Revenue
Europe
27 March 2022	Birmingham	England	Town Hall	Metteson	1,086 / 1,086 (100%)	$69,504
28 March 2022	Newcastle	England	Newcastle University Students' Union	Metteson	1,500 / 1,500 (100%)	$30,000
29 March 2022	Glasgow	England	SWG3	Metteson	1,250 / 1,250 (100%)	$73,750
31 March 2022	Dublin	Ireland	Olympia Theatre	Metteson	1,240 / 1,240 (100%)	$81,840
1 April 2022	Manchester	England	Albert Hall	Metteson	5,272 / 5,272 (100%)	$184,840
3 April 2022	Leeds	England	O2 Academy Leeds	Metteson	2,300 / 2,300 (100%)	$87,400
5 April 2022	Bristol	England	O2 Academy Bristol	Metteson	1,600 / 1,600 (100%)	$75,200
6 April 2022	Brixton	England	O2 Academy Brixton	Metteson	4,921 / 4,921 (100%)	$152,551
North America
15 May 2022	Seattle	United States	Showbox Sodo	Sub Urban	1,150 / 1,150 (100%)	$40,250
17 May 2022	San Francisco	United States	The Warfield	Sub Urban	433 / 2,250 (19%)	$8,227
19 May 2022	Los Angeles	United States	Greek Theatre	Sub Urban	5,800 / 5,800 (100%)	$110,200
20 May 2022	San Diego	United States	The Observatory North Park	Sub Urban	1,100 / 1,100 (100%)	$75,900
21 May 2022	Las Vegas	United States	Brooklyn Bowl	Sub Urban	1,455 / 2,000 (72%)	$50,925
23 May 2022	Englewood	United States	Gothic Theatre	Sub Urban	—N/a	
25 May 2022	Minneapolis	United States	The Fillmore	Sub Urban	—N/a	
27 May 2022	Chicago	United States	Riviera Theatre	Sub Urban	—N/a	
28 May 2022	Detroit	United States	Majestic Theatre	Sub Urban	—N/a	
29 May 2022	Toronto	Canada	History	Sub Urban	—N/a	
31 May 2022	Montreal	Canada	M Telus	Sub Urban	—N/a	
1 June 2022	Boston	United States	Roadrunner	Sub Urban	—N/a	
2 June 2022	Philadelphia	United States	Union Transfer	Sub Urban	—N/a	
4 June 2022	New York	United States	Central Park SummerStage	Sub Urban	—N/a	
5 June 2022	Washington	United States	Lincoln Theatre	Sub Urban	—N/a	
Europe
16 June 2022 (Note: The concert on 16 June 2022 in Bergen is a part of Bergenfest.)	Bergen	Norway	Bergenhus Fortress	—N/a		
18 June 2022 (Note: The concert on 18 June 2022 in Scheeßel is a part of Hurricane Festival.)	Scheeßel	Germany	Eichenring	—N/a		
19 June 2022 (Note: The concert on 19 June 2022 in Tuttlingen is a part of Southside Festival.)	Tuttlingen	Germany	Take-off GewerbePark	—N/a		
21 June 2022	Berlin	Germany	Tempodrom	Sei Selina; Thea Wang	3,500 / 3,500 (100%)	$122,500
22 June 2022	Prague	Czech Republic	Forum Karlín	Sei Selina; Thea Wang	3,000 / 3,000 (100%)	$105,000
24 June 2022	Wrocław	Poland	Centrum Koncertowe A2	Sei Selina; Thea Wang	—N/a	
25 June 2022	Bratislava	Slovakia	A4 Studio	Sei Selina; Thea Wang	—N/a	
27 June 2022	Kraków	Poland	Klub Studio	Sei Selina; Thea Wang	1,100 / 1,100 (100%)	$28,600
28 June 2022	Gdańsk	Poland	Klub B90 Stocznia Gdańsk	Sei Selina; Thea Wang	—N/a	
29 June 2022	Warsaw	Poland	Progresja	Sei Selina; Thea Wang	2,500 / 2,500 (100%)	$75,000
1 July 2022	Vilnius	Lithuania	Lukiškių Kalėjimas 2.0	Sei Selina; Thea Wang	—N/a	
2 July 2022 (Note: The concert on 2 July 2022 in Seinäjoki is a part of Provinssi Festival.)	Seinäjoki	Finland	Törnävänsaari	—N/a		
10 July 2022 (Note: The concert on 10 July 2022 in London is a part of British Summer Time.)	London	England	Hyde Park	—N/a		
15 July 2022 (Note: The concert on 15 July 2022 in Darmstadt is a part of Endlich Open-Air.)	Darmstadt	Germany	Messplatz	—N/a		
17 July 2022 (Note: The concert on 17 July 2022 in Cluj-Napoca is a part of Electric Castle.)	Cluj-Napoca	Romania	Piața Unirii	—N/a		
29 July 2022 (Note: The concert on 29 July 2022 in Arendal is a part of Canal Street Arendal.)	Arendal	Norway	Sam Eydes Plass	—N/a		
13 August 2022 (Note: The concert on 13 August 2022 in Oslo is a part of Øyafestivalen. Aurora performed as headliner on the "Amfiet" stage.)	Oslo	Norway	Tøyen Park	—N/a		
17 August 2022 (Note: The concert on 17 August 2022 in Charleville-Mézières is a part of Cabaret Vert Festival.)	Charleville-Mézières	France	Square Bayard	—N/a		
19 August 2022 (Note: The concert on 19 August 2022 in Dronten is a part of Lowlands Festival.)	Dronten	Netherlands	Walibi World	—N/a		
20 August 2022 (Note: The concert on 20 August 2022 in Hasselt is a part of Pukkelpop.)	Hasselt	Belgium	Domein Kiewit	—N/a		
25 August 2022	Stockholm	Sweden	Fryshuset Klubben	Sei Selina; Thea Wang	2,177 / 3,000 (72%)	$78,372
26 August 2022	Copenhagen	Denmark	Vega	Sei Selina	1,500 / 1,500 (100%)	$54,000
28 August 2022 (Note: The concert on 28 August 2022 in Paris is a part of Rock en Seine.)	Paris	France	Parc de Saint-Cloud	—N/a		
29 August 2022	Paris	France	Le Trianon	Sei Selina	1,091 / 1,091 (100%)	$70,915
31 August 2022	Lausanne	Switzerland	Les Docks	Sei Selina	1000 / 1000 (100%)	$40,000
2 September 2022	Amsterdam	Netherlands	Paradiso	Sei Selina	3,000 / 3,000 (100%)	$195,000
3 September 2022	Amsterdam	Netherlands	Paradiso	Sei Selina	3,000 / 3,000 (100%)	$195,000
4 September 2022	Brussels	Belgium	Ancienne Belgique	Sei Selina	—N/a	
6 September 2022	Zürich	Switzerland	Kaufleuten	Sei Selina	—N/a	
7 September 2022	Milan	Italy	Alcatraz	Sei Selina	—N/a	
8 September 2022	Roma	Italy	Auditorium Parco Della Musica	Sei Selina	—N/a	
10 September 2022 (Note: The concert on 10 September 2022 in Málaga is a part of Andalucía Big Festival.)	Málaga	Spain	Recinto Ferial	—N/a		
11 September 2022	Madrid	Spain	The Music Station	Sei Selina	—N/a	
12 September 2022	Barcelona	Spain	Apolo	Sei Selina	—N/a	
18 November 2022	Trondheim	Norway	Olavshallen	—N/a		
19 November 2022	Trondheim	Norway	Olavshallen	—N/a		
26 November 2022 (Note: During the concert on 26 November 2022 in Oslo, Aurora was surprised by the crew of Norwegian radio channel NRK P3 during the show. Two presenters came on stage to award her the P3 Award, a prize of the P3 Gull 2022 awards show, which was broadcast live while Aurora was in the middle of the concert.)	Oslo	Norway	Sentrum Scene	Hannah Storm	—N/a	
27 November 2022	Oslo	Norway	Sentrum Scene	Hannah Storm	—N/a	
Asia
17 February 2023	Tokyo	Japan	Toyosu Pit	Thea Wang	3,103 / 3,103 (100%)	$114,811
19 February 2023	Seoul	South Korea	Yes24 Live Hall	Thea Wang	301 / 1,090 (28%)	$22,575
21 February 2023 (Note: During the concert on 21 February 2023 in Taipei, Wu Qing-feng joined Aurora onstage to perform their collaboration "Storm".)	Taipei	Taiwan	Zepp New Taipei	Thea Wang	2,245 / 2,245 (100%)	$175,110
23 February 2023	Bangkok	Thailand	CentralWorld Live	Thea Wang	—N/a	
25 February 2023 (1st show)	Jakarta	Indonesia	Balai Sarbini	—N/a	2,600 / 2,600 (100%)	$33,800
25 February 2023 (2nd show)	Jakarta	Indonesia	Balai Sarbini	—N/a	2,600 / 2,600 (100%)	$33,800
27 February 2023	Singapore		The Theatre at Mediacorp	Hannah Storm	716 / 1,541 (46%)	$73,032
Australia
3 March 2023	Auckland	New Zealand	Powerstation	Blusher	—N/a	
5 March 2023	Brisbane	Australia	The Fortitude Music Hall	Blusher	—N/a	
6 March 2023	Sydney	Australia	Liberty Hall	Blusher	1,200 / 1,200 (100%)	$96,000
7 March 2023	Sydney	Australia	Sydney Opera House	Blusher	2,896 / 2,896 (100%)	$401,660
9 March 2023	Melbourne	Australia	Palais Theatre	Blusher	5,738 / 5,738 (100%)	$283,808
10 March 2023 (Note: The concert on 10 March 2023 in Adelaide is a part of WOMADelaide.)	Adelaide	Australia	Adelaide Botanic Garden	—N/a		
Latin America
17 March 2023 (Note: The concert on 17 March 2023 in Buenos Aires is a part of Lollapalooza Argentina.)	Buenos Aires	Argentina	Hipódromo de San Isidro	—N/a		
18 March 2023 (Note: The concert on 18 March 2023 in Santiago is a part of Lollapalooza Chile.)	Santiago	Chile	Parque Bicentenario de Cerrilos	—N/a		
22 March 2023	Lima	Peru	Parque de la Exposición	Thea Wang	4,000 / 4,000 (100%)	$176,000
24 March 2023 (Note: The concert on 24 March 2023 in Bogotá is a part of Festival Estéreo Picnic.)	Bogotá	Colombia	Centro de Eventos Briceño 18	—N/a		
26 March 2023 (Note: The concert on 26 March 2023 in São Paulo is a part of Lollapalooza Brazil.)	São Paulo	Brazil	Autódromo José Carlos Pace	—N/a		
12 April 2023	Guadalajara	Mexico	Diana Theatre	Hannah Storm	4,690 / 4,690 (100%)	$342,370
13 April 2023	Guadalajara	Mexico	Diana Theatre	Hannah Storm	4,690 / 4,690 (100%)	$342,370
15 April 2023	Mexico City	Mexico	Pepsi Center WTC	Hannah Storm	8,000 / 8,000 (100%)	$584,000
16 April 2023	Monterrey	Mexico	Showcenter Complex	Hannah Storm	4,000 / 4,000 (100%)	$228,000
18 April 2023	Mexico City	Mexico	Pepsi Center WTC	Hannah Storm	8,000 / 8,000 (100%)	$584,000
Total					97,964 / 102,763 (95.33%)	$5,112,640

== Summer shows extension ==
On 13 July 2023, Aurora announced the summer shows, an extension of the tour based on festivals through Europe. Its schedule began in Rome, Italy on 1 May 2023, and concluded on 9 September in Berlin, Germany with a total of 27 festival stops.

Date (2023)	City	Country	Festival
1 May	Rome	Italy	Concerto del Primo Maggio
2 June	Warsaw	Poland	Orange Warsaw Festival
10 June	Dijon	France	VYV Festival
16 June	Stavanger	Norway	Mablisfestivalen
17 June	Turku	Finland	Kesärauha
22 June	Prague	Czech Republic	Metronome Prague
24 June	Kvinnherad	Norway	Festidalen
29 June	Rotselaar	Belgium	Rock Werchter
30 June	Vilanova i la Geltrú	Spain	Vida Festival
1 July	St. Gallen	Switzerland	Open Air St. Gallen
3 July	Rome	Italy	Roma Summer Fest
4 July	Ravenna	Italy	Ravenna Festival
7 July	Træna	Norway	Trænafestivalen
8 July	Kongsberg	Norway	Kongsberg Jazzfestival
9 July	Kragerø	Norway	Portør Pensjonat
14 July	Tvedestrand	Norway	Kystkulturuka
20 July	Tromsø	Norway	Buktafestivalen
21 July	Foynhagen	Norway	Sommer i Tønsberg
23 July	Bude	England	Leopallooza
29 July	Fredrikstad	Norway	Månefestivalen
10 August	Stavanger	Norway	Stronger2gether Festival
11 August	Gothenburg	Sweden	Way Out West
18 August	Bodø	Norway	Parkenfestivalen
19 August	Trondheim	Norway	Pstereo Festival
27 August	London	England	All Points East
3 September	Munich	Germany	Superbloom Festival
9 September	Berlin	Germany	Lollapalooza Berlin
