= What Happened to the Earth? =

2024–25 concert tour by Aurora

- Tour by Aurora
- European leg promotional poster
- Location: Asia; Australia; Europe; Latin America; North America
- Associated album: What Happened to the Heart?
- Start date: 26 June 2024
- End date: 15 November 2025
- No. of shows: 89
- Supporting acts: Aleyna Tilki; Amalie Holt Kleive; Amy Michelle; Biig Piig; Briela Ojeda; Ena Mori; Fredrik Svabø; Hannah Brewer; Jack Kane; Joanna; Lorena Blume; Mar Marzo; Montse; Nadin Amizah; Nicole Zignago; Odd Luke; Pearling; Pomme; Thea Wang; Unflirt; Wednesday Campanella; Yaelokre; Yma
- Attendance: 300,000

Aurora concert chronology
- The Gods We Can Touch Tour (2022–23); What Happened to the Earth? (2024–25)

The What Happened to the Earth? was the fifth concert tour by Norwegian singer and songwriter Aurora, in support of her fifth studio album What Happened to the Heart? (2024). The tour commenced on 26 June 2024 in Dublin, Ireland, and concluded on 15 November 2025 in Mexico City, Mexico, spanning nearly 90 shows through Europe, Latin America, North America, Asia, and Australia.

== Background ==
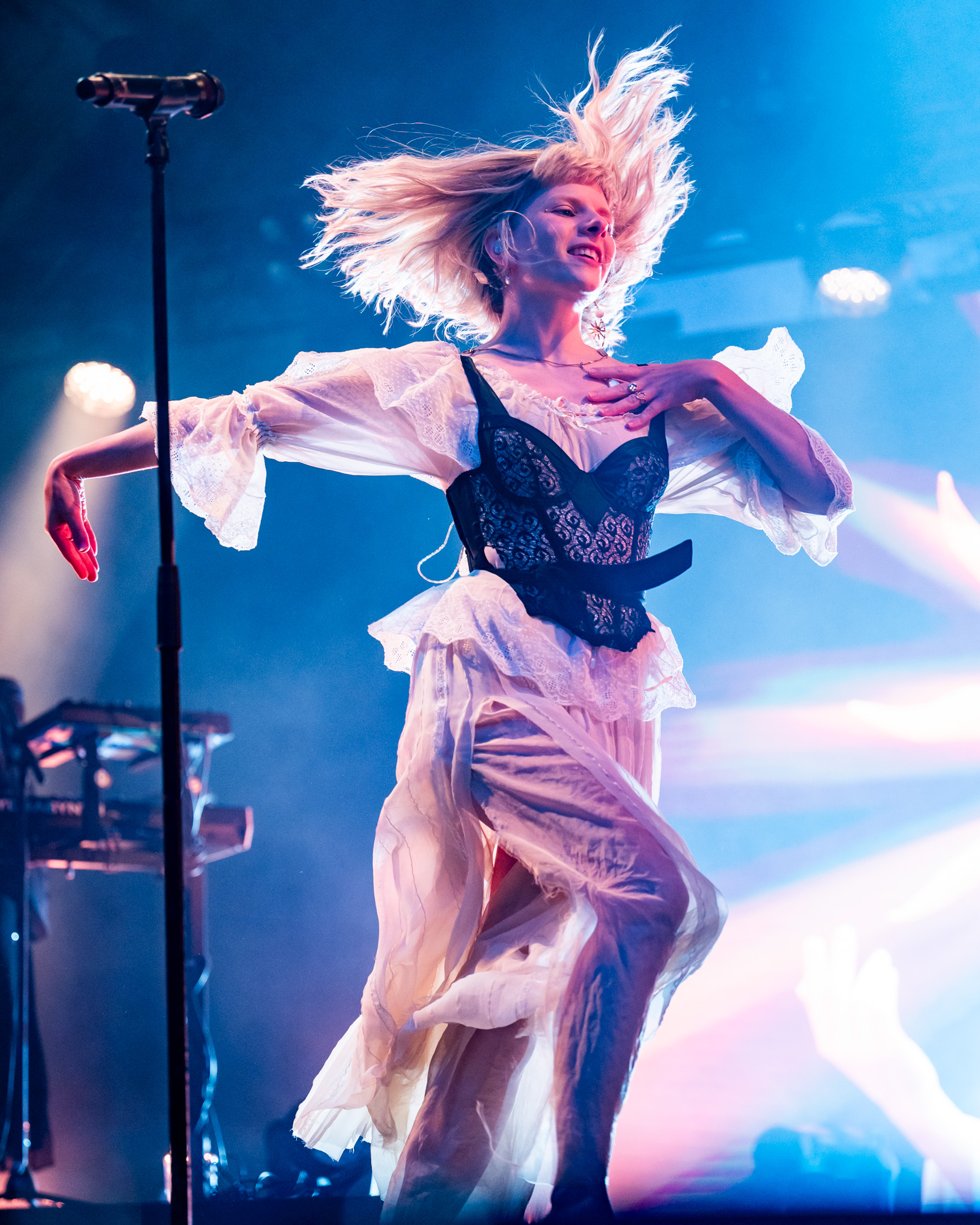
Aurora performing in Kristiansand, Norway (2024)

The tour was announced alongside the album on 28 March 2024, with the first European leg confirmed and tickets going on general sale on 5 April. Fans who pre-ordered the album were given early access through an exclusive pre-sale link two days prior.

On 14 May, Aurora revealed the North American dates via her official website and social media channels, followed by the announcement of a Latin American leg on 27 May—marking her first full arena tour. Australian and Japanese dates were confirmed on 13 and 21 August, respectively. Further shows in Asia, including stops in Manila, Kuala Lumpur, Singapore, Seoul, and Hong Kong, were announced on 22 October. Dates in China followed on 16 December, with general ticket sales beginning on 20 December.

The final leg of the tour, returning to Europe in 2025, was announced later that year, with general tickets going on sale from 12 June 2024. On 23 June, Aurora was also confirmed as a headliner for Norway's Piknik i Parken and Bergenfest festivals.

Prior to starting her headlining tour, Aurora made several festival appearances in Europe and Asia to promote her album What Happened to the Heart?. She appeared at Glastonbury in the United Kingdom, where her set was widely praised by critics. The following week, she performed at the Roskilde in Denmark. She also headlined Ravnedalen Live in Norway. Aurora made other appearances including at Sziget in Hungary, Paléo in Switzerland, NOS Alive in Portugal, and Summer Sonic in Japan and Thailand.

== Commercial performance ==
Set to draw approximately 300,000 attendees across 58 solo dates, the tour marked Aurora's transition from theater venues to larger arenas and music halls. Tickets for the Paris date sold out in 10 minutes, and due to high demand, additional dates were added at the Beacon Theatre in New York and the Fortitude Music Hall in Brisbane.

During the Latin American leg, Aurora performed the largest headline show of her career with a sold-out audience of 18,000 at Palacio de los Deportes in Mexico City. Nicolas Izzo, reported that nearly 40,000 people attended the three shows held in Mexico. In November, it was reported that more than 60,000 people attended the first European leg of the tour. Norwegian newspaper Bergens Tidende noted that Aurora attracted a large international audience to the Bergenfest ahead of her performance.

On 11 February 2025, Aurora set a new attendance record at Margaret Court Arena in Melbourne, where she performed to a sold-out crowd of 7,062—making it the highest single-day attendance for an entertainment event at the venue.

== Set list ==
=== June to August 2024 ===
This set list was taken from the show in Dublin on June 26, 2024. It does not represent all shows throughout the tour.

1. "Goddess of Dawn" (Video Intro)
2. "To Be Alright"
3. "Some Type of Skin"
4. "The River"
5. "A Soul with No King"
6. "The Forbidden Fruits of Eden" (Intro)
7. "Heathens"
8. "The Dark Dresses Lightly"
9. "Dreams" (Acoustic)
10. "Exist for Love" (Acoustic)
11. "Through the Eyes of a Child"
12. "Runaway"
13. "Churchyard"
14. "The Seed"
15. "Cure for Me"
16. "Giving In to the Love"
17. "Murder Song (5, 4, 3, 2, 1)" (Acoustic)
18. "Starvation"
19. "My Body is Not Mine" (Outro)

=== Since September 2024 ===
This set list was taken from the show in London on October 2, 2024. It does not represent all shows throughout the tour.

1. "The Goddess of Dusk" (Video Intro)
2. "Churchyard"
3. "Soulless Creatures"
4. "A Soul with No King"
5. "Murder Song (5, 4, 3, 2, 1)" (Acoustic)
6. "Heathens"
7. "The Forbidden Fruits of Eden" (Intro)
8. "The Dark Dresses Lightly"
9. "Exist for Love" (Acoustic)
10. "Dreams" (Acoustic)
11. "Echo of My Shadow" / "The River" (Acapella) (Note: The concert on 2 October 2024 at the Royal Albert Hall in London featured live organ arrangements by organist Anna Lapwood in "Echo of My Shadow", "The River" and "The Seed".)
12. "Runaway"
13. "The Seed"
14. "Starvation" (With extended outro)
15. "Queendom"
16. "Giving In to the Love"
17. "Cure for Me"
18. "Some Type of Skin"
19. "Invisible Wounds"
20. "A Little Place Called the Moon" (Outro)

== Tour dates ==
List of 2024 concerts
Date (2024)	City	Country	Venue	Opening acts
26 June	Dublin	Ireland	National Stadium	Amy Michelle
28 June (Note: The concert on 28 June 2024 in Pilton is a part of Glastonbury Festival. Aurora performed on "The Park" stage.)	Pilton	England	Worthy Farm	—N/a
5 July (Note: The concert on 5 July 2024 in Roskilde is a part of Roskilde Festival. Aurora performed on the "Orange Scene" stage.)	Roskilde	Denmark	Dyrskuepladsen	—N/a
6 July (Note: The concert on 6 July 2024 in Beuningen is a part of DTRH Festival. Aurora performed on the "Teddy Widder" stage.)	Beuningen	Netherlands	Groene Heuvels	—N/a
10 July (Note: The concert on 10 July 2024 in Tønsberg is a part of Slottsfjell Festival. Aurora performed on the "Baglerscenen" stage.)	Tønsberg	Norway	Slottsfjell	—N/a
12 July (Note: The concert on 12 July 2024 in Algés is a part of NOS Alive. Aurora performed on the "Heineken" stage.)	Algés	Portugal	Passeio Marítimo de Algés	—N/a
13 July (Note: The concert on 13 July 2024 in Barcelona is a part of Cruïlla Festival. Aurora performed on the "Vueling" stage.)	Barcelona	Spain	Parc del Fòrum	—N/a
18 July (Note: The concert on 18 July 2024 in Kristiansand is a part of Ravnedalen Live. Aurora performed on the main stage.)	Kristiansand	Norway	Ravnedalen Park	—N/a
19 July (Note: The concert on 19 July 2024 in Nordfjordeid is a part of Malakoff Festival. Aurora performed on the "Malakoffscena" stage.)	Nordfjordeid	Norway	Malakoff Park	—N/a
24 July (Note: The concert on 24 July 2024 in Nyon is a part of Paléo Festival. Aurora performed on the "Véga" stage.)	Nyon	Switzerland	Plaine de l'Asse	—N/a
8 August (Note: The concert on 8 August 2024 in Budapest is a part of Sziget Festival. Aurora performed on the "Revolut" stage.)	Budapest	Hungary	Óbudai-Sziget	—N/a
10 August (Note: The concert on 10 August 2024 in Helsinki is a part of Flow Festival.)	Helsinki	Finland	Suvilahti	—N/a
17 August (Note: The concerts on 17 and 18 August 2024 were part of the Summer Sonic. Aurora performed on the "Sonic" stage.)	Osaka	Japan	Omatsuri Hiroba	—N/a
18 August	Tokyo	Japan	Makuhari Messe	—N/a
23 August (Note: The concert on 23 August 2024 in Jakarta is a part of LaLaLa Festival.)	Jakarta	Indonesia	Jakarta International Expo	—N/a
25 August (Note: The concert on 25 August 2024 in Bangkok is a part of Summer Sonic Bangkok. Aurora performed on "The Mega Stage".)	Bangkok	Thailand	Impact Challenger Hall 1	—N/a
31 August (Note: The concert on 31 August 2024 in Glattbrugg is a part of Zürich Openair. Aurora performed on the "Zoa" stage.)	Glattbrugg	Switzerland	Opfikon	—N/a
18 September	Milan	Italy	Alcatraz	Unflirt
20 September	Vienna	Austria	Gasometer	Unflirt
21 September	Prague	Czech Republic	Sportovní hala Fortuna	Unflirt
23 September	Kraków	Poland	Tauron Arena	Unflirt
24 September	Warsaw	Poland	COS Torwar	Unflirt
25 September	Berlin	Germany	Velodrom	Unflirt
27 September	Brussel	Belgium	Forest National	Unflirt
28 September	Amsterdam	Netherlands	AFAS Live	Unflirt
30 September	Paris	France	L'Olympia	Unflirt
2 October	London	England	Royal Albert Hall	Unflirt
4 October	Manchester	England	O2 Apollo Manchester	Unflirt
5 October	Edinburgh	Scotland	Usher Hall	Unflirt; Pearling
30 October	Monterrey	Mexico	Auditorio Citibanamex	Nicole Zignago
31 October	Guadalajara	Mexico	Auditorio Telmex	Nicole Zignago
2 November	Mexico City	Mexico	Palacio de los Deportes	Nicole Zignago; Thea Wang
6 November	Bogotá	Colombia	Gran Carpa	Briela Ojeda
8 November	Lima	Peru	Multiespacio Costa 21	Lorena Blume
10 November	Santiago	Chile	Movistar Arena	Montse
13 November	Buenos Aires	Argentina	Movistar Arena	Mar Marzo
16 November	São Paulo	Brazil	Espaço Unimed	Yma
21 November	Los Angeles	United States	Shrine Auditorium	Biig Piig
23 November	San Francisco	United States	Bill Graham Civic Auditorium	Biig Piig
26 November	Seattle	United States	WaMu Theater	Biig Piig
29 November	Chicago	United States	Byline Bank Aragon Ballroom	Biig Piig
2 December	Toronto	Canada	History	Biig Piig
4 December	Boston	United States	MGM Music Hall at Fenway	Biig Piig
5 December	New York	United States	The Beacon Theatre	Biig Piig
6 December	New York	United States	The Beacon Theatre	Biig Piig
8 December	Washington, D.C.	United States	The Anthem	Biig Piig
9 December	Philadelphia	United States	The Fillmore	Biig Piig

List of 2025 concerts
Date (2025)	City	Country	Venue	Opening acts
31 January	Manila	Philippines	New Frontier Theater	Yaelokre; Ena Mori
2 February	Kuala Lumpur	Malaysia	Zepp Kuala Lumpur	Nadin Amizah
3 February	Singapore		The Star Performing Arts Centre	Ena Mori
6 February	Fremantle	Australia	Fremantle Prison	Odd Luke; Hannah Brewer
8 February	Sydney	Australia	Hordern Pavilion	Odd Luke; Hannah Brewer
9 February (Note: The concert on 9 February 2025 in Carrick is a part of Party in the Paddock. Aurora performed on the "Paddock" stage.)	Carrick	Australia	Quercus Park	—N/a
11 February	Melbourne	Australia	Margaret Court Arena	Odd Luke; Hannah Brewer
13 February	Brisbane	Australia	Fortitude Music Hall	Odd Luke; Hannah Brewer
14 February	Brisbane	Australia	Fortitude Music Hall	Odd Luke; Hannah Brewer
17 February (Note: During the concert on 17 February 2025 in Tokyo, Atarashii Gakko! joined Aurora onstage to perform their rework of "Some Type of Skin".)	Tokyo	Japan	Tokyo Garden Theater	Wednesday Campanella
18 February	Osaka	Japan	Zepp Namba	Wednesday Campanella
22 February	Seoul	South Korea	Kwangwoon University Donghae Arts Center	—N/a
24 February	Hong Kong		AsiaWorld–Expo, Hall 5	—N/a
26 February	Guangzhou	China	Sun Yat-sen Memorial Hall	—N/a
28 February	Shanghai	China	Echo Music Park	—N/a
2 March	Beijing	China	Beijing Exhibition Center	—N/a
5 March	Chengdu	China	Huaxi Live - 528 M Space	—N/a
8 March (Note: The concert on 8 March 2025 in Mumbai is a part of Lollapalooza India. Aurora performed on the "Keep Walking" stage.)	Mumbai	India	Mahalaxmi Racecourse	—N/a
28 April	Stockholm	Sweden	Fryshuset	Fredrik Svabø; Pomme
29 April	Copenhagen	Denmark	K.B. Hallen	Fredrik Svabø; Pomme
1 May	Amsterdam	Netherlands	Ziggo Dome	Fredrik Svabø; Pomme
3 May	London	England	OVO Arena Wembley	Fredrik Svabø; Pomme
5 May	Paris	France	Le Zénith	Fredrik Svabø; Joanna
7 May	Madrid	Spain	Movistar Arena	Fredrik Svabø; Pomme
9 May	Lisbon	Portugal	Sagres Campo Pequeno	Fredrik Svabø; Pomme
13 June (Note: The concert on 13 June 2025 in Oslo is a part of Piknik i Parken. Aurora performed as headliner on the "Sophie" stage.)	Oslo	Norway	Sofienbergparken	—N/a
14 June (Note: The concert on 14 June 2025 in Bergen is a part of Bergenfest. Aurora performed as headliner on the "Plenen" stage.)	Bergen	Norway	Bergenhus Festning	—N/a
29 June (Note: The concert on 29 June 2025 in Dublin is a part of Trinity Summer Series.)	Dublin	Ireland	Trinity College	Jack Kane
4 July	Budapest	Hungary	Budapest Park	Amalie Holt Kleive
5 July	Bucharest	Romania	Arenele Romane	Amalie Holt Kleive
11 July (Note: The concert on 11 July 2025 in Athens is a part of Release Athens.)	Athens	Greece	Plateia Nerou	—N/a
12 July	Istanbul	Turkey	KüçükÇiftlik Park	Amalie Holt Kleive; Aleyna Tilki
19 July (Note: The concert on 19 July 2025 in Carhaix is a part of Vieilles Charrues Festival.)	Carhaix	France	Site de Kerampuilh	—N/a
2 August (Note: The concert on 2 August 2025 in Oxfordshire is a part of Wilderness Festival.)	Oxfordshire	England	Cornbury Park	—N/a
15 August (Note: The concert on 14 August 2025 in Sankt Pölten is a part of FM4 Frequency Festival.)	Sankt Pölten	Austria	Green Park St. Pölten	—N/a
16 August (Note: The concert on 16 August 2025 in Winterthur is a part of Winterthurer Musikfestwochen.)	Winterthur	Switzerland	Steinberggasse Street	—N/a
17 August (Note: The concert on 17 August 2025 in Hasselt is a part of Pukkelpop.)	Hasselt	Belgium	Domein Kiewit	—N/a
21 August (Note: The concert on 21 August 2025 in Château-Gontier is a part of V and B Fest.)	Château-Gontier	France	Château de la Maroutière	—N/a
22 August (Note: The concert on 22 August 2025 in Paris is a part of Rock en Seine.)	Paris	France	Parc de Saint-Cloud	—N/a
31 August (Note: The concert on 31 August 2025 in Seattle is a part of Bumbershoot.)	Seattle	United States	Seattle Center	—N/a
8 November (Note: The concert on 8 November 2025 in Santiago is a part of Festival Fauna Primavera.)	Santiago	Chile	Parque Ciudad Empresarial	—N/a
15 November (Note: The concert on 15 November 2025 in Mexico City is a part of Corona Capital.)	Mexico City	Mexico	Autódromo Hermanos Rodríguez	—N/a
