= Heathen =

Heathen or Heathens may refer to:

== Religion ==
- Heathen, another name for a pagan
- Heathen, an adherent of Heathenry (new religious movement)

== Music ==
=== Performers ===
- Heathen (band), an American thrash metal band formed in 1984
- The Heathens, a 2005–2007 American indie rock band
- Band of Heathens, an American rock and roll band formed in 2005

=== Albums ===
- Heathen (David Bowie album) or the title song, 2002
- Heathen (Thou album), 2014
- Heathen, by Wyrd, 2001

=== Songs ===
- "Heathens" (Aurora song), 2021
- "Heathens" (Twenty One Pilots song), 2016
- "Heathens", by Drive-By Truckers from Decoration Day, 2003
- "The Heathen", by Bob Marley and the Wailers from Exodus, 1977

== Other uses ==
- Heathen (film), a 2009 film by Ross Shepherd
- "The Heathen", a 1910 short story by Jack London

== See also ==
- Heath hen
- Heathenry (disambiguation)
- Pagan (disambiguation)
