= The Woman I Am =

The Woman I Am may refer to:

== Music ==
=== Albums ===
- The Woman I Am (Chaka Khan album), 1992, or the title track
- The Woman I Am (Kellie Pickler album), 2013, or the title track
- The Woman I Am: The Definitive Collection, compilation album by Helen Reddy, 2006
- The Woman I Am, album by The Weather Girls, 2009
- The Woman I Am, album by Cherrelle, 1991

=== Songs ===
- "The Woman I Am" (song), by Aurora, 2022
- "The Woman I Am", by Tammy Wynette from Woman to Woman, 1974

== Books ==
- The Woman I Am: a memoir, by Helen Reddy, 2006
- The Woman I Am, by Catherine Kidwell, 1979
- The Woman I Am, by Dorothy Livesay, 1991
- The Woman I Am: Poems, by Nancy Keesing, 1993

== See also ==
- "I Am Woman", 1971 song by Helen Reddy
- All the Women I Am, 2010 album by Reba McEntire
