= Pagan (disambiguation) =

A pagan is an adherent of paganism.

Pagan may also refer to:

== Places ==
- Bagan, a city in Myanmar, also known as Pagan
  - Pagan kingdom, 849–1287, Burmese Empire
  - Battle of Pagan in 1287, Mongol defeat of Pagan Kingdom
- Pagan (island), in the Marianas archipelago

== People ==
- Pagan (name), people with the given name (first name) Pagan
- Pagan (chancellor), first chancellor of the Kingdom of Jerusalem
- Ángel Pagán (born 1981), Puerto Rican baseball player
- Blaise Francois Pagan (1603–1665), French military engineer and fortification theorician
- Dave Pagan (born 1949), Canadian baseball player
- Denis Pagan (born 1947), Australian rules football player and coach
- Emilio Pagán (born 1991), Italian & Puerto Rican baseball pitcher
- Hugues Pagan (born 1947), French detective writer
- Isabel Pagan (c. 1740 – 1821), Scottish poet
- José Pagán (1935–2011), Puerto Rican baseball player
- Maria Pagan (contemporary), official at the Office of the United States Trade Representative
- María Vega Pagán (born 1977), Puerto Rican politician
- Michael J. Pagan (born 1985), American actor

== Groups ==
- Pagan's Motorcycle Club

== Entertainment ==
=== Music ===
- Pagan metal, a subgenres of Heavy metal music
- Pagan (album), the 6th album by Celtic metal band Cruachan
- Pagan Records, a record label

=== Films ===
- The Pagan, 1929 film
- P.A.G.A.N. (People Against Goodness And Normalcy), a fictional organization in the 1987 parody film Dragnet

=== Video games ===
- Ultima VIII: Pagan, 1994 videogame
- Order of the Vine, a druidic faction in the Thief video game series

== See also ==
- Pagans (disambiguation)
- Heathen (disambiguation)
