= Heathenry =

Heathenry, heathenism or heathendom may refer to:

- Heathenry (new religious movement), a form of modern paganism focused on Germanic religions
- Paganism
- Modern paganism

== See also ==
- Heathen (disambiguation)
