= Pagans =

Pagans may refer to:

- Paganism, a group of pre-Christian religions practiced in the Roman Empire
- Modern paganism, a group of contemporary religious practices
- Pagan's Motorcycle Club, a motorcycle club
- The Pagans, a 1970s American punk band
- The Pagans (film), a 1953 Italian film

== See also ==
- Pagan (disambiguation)
