= Yaelokre =

Filipino-Icelandic singer-songwriter and multimedia artist

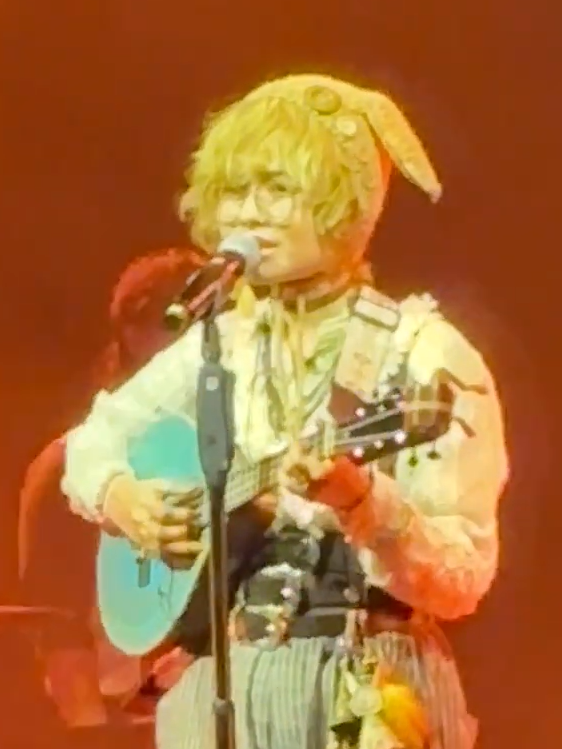
- Ósk in 2025

Background information
- Born: Christopher Kristjansson
- Origin: Luzon, Philippines
- Genres: Folk; OPM
- Occupations: Singer-songwriter; multimedia artist
- Instruments: Custom 8-string ukulele; Guitalele; vocals
- Years active: 2024–present
- Label: Atlantic Records

Christopher Kristjansson (born September 4), known professionally as Keath Ósk, is a Filipino-Icelandic singer-songwriter and multimedia artist known for their (Note: Ósk uses they/it pronouns. This article uses they/them for consistency.) folk music storytelling project under the stage name Yaelokre. (Note: There is no standardized pronunciation of Yaelokre according to Ósk.) Ósk began releasing music under the project name in early 2024, going viral on TikTok in July of the same year for their song "Harpy Hare", entering the TikTok Billboard Top 50 and topping Spotify's Global Viral Songs Chart the same year.

They frequently perform in-character at live shows, with animal-themed masks and Renaissance-esque outfits representing various characters within the setting of the project. They have received praise for their artistry and style, with Yaelokre being named as a representative of both folk revival and Original Pilipino Music.

== Early life ==
Christopher Kristjansson was born on September 4 (Note: "Birthday fellow 🐦". September 4, 2024 – via Facebook.) to Filipino parents and was adopted into an Icelandic family. (Note: "Do not fret ✋ i am full filipino adopted by an icelandic family". December 18, 2025 – via Twitter.) While growing up, Ósk stated that their mother, a singer, taught them how to play the guitar, the chords on a piano, and how to sing while their father read fantasy storybooks and fairytales to them. With these influences, Ósk had planned to go to college to pursue a career as a kindergarten teacher, with their second choice being an author of children's storybooks.

== Career ==
=== 2024 ===
Ósk began releasing music under a storytelling project named Yaelokre in early 2024 with the single "Harpy Hare", which would later receive a music video illustrated by Ósk themself; the project was compared to The Lord of the Rings by Kara Angan of Rappler. The project is set in a world named Meadowlark and focuses on a musical ensemble called The Lark, consisting of four characters – Cole Seymour, Clémente Dearworth, Peregrine August, and Kingsley – who each wear animal-themed masks (in order: leveret, kid, moose, and tree) and are all voiced by Ósk. The characters themselves are based on Ósk's experiences while growing up. During live performances or lives on TikTok, Ósk wears such masks, Renaissance-esque outfits, and other clothing items such as a rabbit-shaped hat, commonly decorated with items that represent the characters within Meadowlark.

Kristin Robinson of Billboard commented on how Yaelokre continued the revival of folk music through the combination of Ósk's illustrations and their songs. Robinson additionally compared the song and its accompanying music video to a blend of the band Gorillaz and the illustrations of Maurice Sendak on the book Where the Wild Things Are, much to acclaim. They then released their debut EP entitled Hayfields in March, which included "Harpy Hare". The EP serves as a prelude for the storyline within Yaelokre.

The single later went viral in July on TikTok and YouTube, with Ósk gaining millions of listeners on Spotify and YouTube. Upon its virality, fans created original characters based on the Larks, fan art, made theories surrounding the project's setting, and posted videos emulating the choreography within its music video. It topped Spotify's Global Viral Songs Chart on the 15th for nine days straight while maintaining a placement on the top-half of the chart further on and entered the TikTok Billboard Top 50 by Billboard on the week beginning July 20 at the 45th placement before peaking to 34th in its second week on the chart. Official on-demand U.S. streams of the song rose to 577% from June 14 to July 11, and rose again by 186% on the following week. With this virality, they decided to pursue music rather than a teaching job. Yaelokre released their second EP Songs of Origin, which included the singles "Bird Cage Blue And Yellow" and "My Farewells To The Fields".

=== 2025 ===
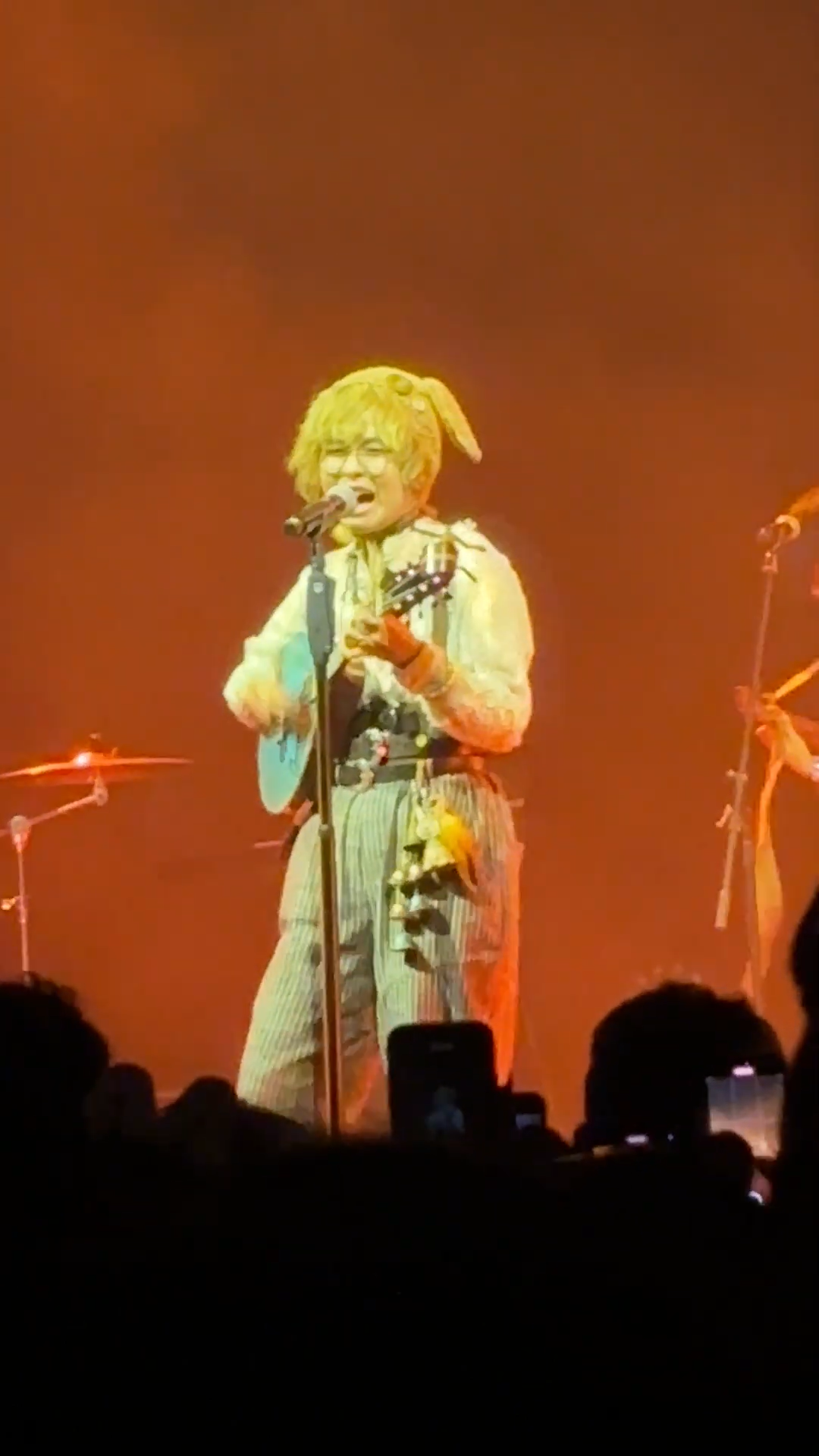
Yaelokre performing at New Frontier Theater, Quezon City, in 2025

A band representing Yaelokre composed of Ósk, percussionist Reynaldo Capuno, guitarist Emil Ortega, drummer Eugene Rabang, and bassist JD Santos, were one of the opening acts for Norwegian singer-songwriter Aurora during her What Happened to the Earth? tour stop in Manila. It would be the first time that Yaelokre performed at the New Frontier Theater at a capacity of 3000, with prior gigs by the group holding around 20 to 200 people. During an interview with Rappler before the performance, Ósk commented that the virality of their songs felt horrible though stated that "something magical happened" as they were reminded by their friends who helped them pursue Yaelokre.

Following Yaelokre's performance at the tour, they released two new singles entitled "Kid & Leveret" and "Cole's Response". On May 27, 2025, they announced a world tour named the "Foreword Tour" through an animated trailer featuring Clémente and Cooper, characters of the project. Multiple locations of the tour to be held across North America and Europe were announced. Nearing the end of the tour, Yaelokre released their third EP entitled Origins which serves as a prologue to the mythology of the four main characters in the story. Each track in the EP focuses on one of the characters to introduce their own perspectives in Meadowlark.

=== 2026 ===
In July 2026, Ósk announced a new studio album titled Foreword, set to be released on 4th, September, 2026. The album consists of previously released tracks that were reinterpreted, allowing them to explore a different sound outside the style that Yaelokre had established for their previous works.

== Genre and reception ==
Outside of folk, Yaelokre's genre have also been described as a part of Original Pilipino Music (OPM), with Angan stating that the project has a role within its future, "one that's filled with magic, mystery, and wonder." Rafael Bautista of Nylon Manila further commented that the "level of creativity" in Ósk's style is rarely found in OPM, describing their work with "wonder and magic" due to the project's style and storyline.

In listicles, Nylon Manila listed Yaelokre as one of "11 Breakout Stars From 2024 We Loved Seeing Winning," while Billboard Philippines counted Yaelokre in a list of "Filipino Artists To Look Out For This 2025."

== Personal life ==
Ósk is genderless and uses they/it pronouns. They also identify as a lesbian. Ósk has never revealed their age online and does not intend to, describing themself as "Keath years old."

== Discography ==
=== Studio albums ===
List of studio albums
Title	Details
Foreword	Released: September 4, 2026; Label: Atlantic Records; Format: Digital download, streaming, CD

=== Extended plays ===
List of extended plays
Title	Details
Hayfields	Released: March 2, 2024; Label: Self-released; Format: Digital download, streaming, vinyl
Songs of Origin	Released: September 25, 2024; Label: Self-released; Format: Digital download, streaming
Origins	Released: October 23, 2025; Label: Atlantic Records; Format: Digital download, streaming, vinyl
Composing Colentine	Released: February 12, 2026; Label: Atlantic Records; Format: Digital download, streaming, vinyl

=== Singles ===
List of singles, with selected chart positions
Title	Year	Peak chart positions		Album
Title	Year	UK Indie	US TikTok	Album
"Harpy Hare"	2024	19	34	Hayfields
"Kid & Leveret"	2025	—	—	Composing Colentine
"Cole's Response"	2025	—	—	Composing Colentine
"To douse a scalded tongue"	2025	—	—	Origins
"And the Hound - Reprise"	2026	—	—	Non-album single
"And the Hound" (2026 version)	2026	—	—	Foreword
"Neath the grove is a heart" (2026 version)	2026	—	—	Foreword
"Hartebeest" (2026 version)	2026	—	—	Foreword
"—" denotes a recording that did not chart or was not released in that territory.
