= Heathen (film) =

2009 film

- Directed by: Ross Shepherd
- Written by: Ross Shepherd; Tom Rudd
- Produced by: Jamie Tighe; Ross Shepherd
- Starring: Tom Rudd; Amber Coombs; Thomas J Grube; John Hoye; Steve Lorrigan
- Cinematography: Ross Shepherd
- Edited by: Ross Shepherd
- Music by: Wilx
- Production company: Paravel Films
- Distributed by: BritFilms
- Release date: 16 November 2009
- Running time: 90 minutes
- Country: United Kingdom
- Language: English
- Budget: £4,000

Heathen is a 2009 British thriller film directed by Ross Shepherd. It tells the story of William Hunt, a reclusive railway worker, who suddenly finds himself on the trail of his missing brother, when he is sent mysterious clues relating to his disappearance. Shot in the city of Brighton, Heathen is a no budget film.

== Plot ==
It has been a year since William's brother David went missing. The worst year of his life, one that has left him a broken man. Chloe, an attractive French artist moves into William's bleak apartment block and expresses an interest in him, bringing him an abstract portrait as a gift. They become an item and William's life appears to be taking a turn for the better. This is short lived however, as out of the blue William starts receiving strange messages relating to the disappearance of his brother. His relationship with Chloe starts to suffer as William becomes very paranoid, believing a strange man is following him and sending him the messages.

William catches sight of the mysterious man leaving his apartment block. Inside he finds Chloe, deeply upset after being attacked by the man and threatened. She is instructed to give William a message: the whereabouts of his brothers body. William and Chloe immediately embark on a car journey to the forest location where the man has instructed them to find the grave. Upon arriving, they are greeted by the mysterious man, Harry. Harry reveals his involvement in David's killing and points to where the body is buried. William attacks Harry and demands more information. Harry, bloodied and bruised from Williams punches reveals that it was not he who killed David, but Chloe. William, deeply shocked listens as Harry explains how Chloe seemingly accidentally asphyxiated David. William snaps, believing Harry to be lying to him, he launches at him once again, only to impale him accidentally on a tree stump, killing him. Chloe suddenly changes, revealing her true personality, and claiming that she planned for William to kill Harry all along, freeing her of the only witness to David's death. After a short struggle with Chloe, William realises he is trapped, blackmailed into burying Harry's body and keeping Chloe's evil secrets from the police.

== Cast ==
- Tom Rudd as William Hunt
- Amber Coombs as Chloe
- Thomas J Grube as Harry
- John Hoye as Josh
- Steve Lorrigan as David Hunt

== Production ==
Heathen was filmed in Brighton, England, using a Panasonic AG-DVX100, a popular camera amongst independent film-makers. Production spanned most of 2008 with the cast and crew only able to shoot on weekends and free time due to the lack of budget. The film was scripted by Shepherd and leading actor Tom Rudd, the pair deciding that the best way to get a feature film off the ground was to do it themselves, planning a script around their limited budget. After two months of filming Jamie Tighe joined the production as sound recordist and producer, helping Shepherd secure several key locations. The cast list grew to include Amber Coombs as Chloe and Thomas J. Grube as Harry. Shepherd had worked with Grube on a short film after graduating from film school and had approached the actor thinking he still lived in London. However Grube, a native New Yorker was now based back in the U.S. but he was so taken with the script and the tragic love story of his character, that he flew himself back to the UK for a week of shooting, staying with director Shepherd.

After the film was completed it was picked up for Worldwide DVD distribution by Nottingham based BritFilms DVD. It received a region 2 release on 16 November 2009.

== Reception ==
Heathen received positive reviews. Chicago Film Monthly critic Jason Coffman called the film "Undeniably hypnotic and well worth seeking out" with "a solid central performance from Rudd". The film received glowing responses from several sources including MovieCentral.TV, The Zone, The Source, and cult film journalist MJ Simpson: "Heathen is a dramatic thriller with interesting characters, excellent acting, assured direction, an original story, imaginative editing and excellent sound. Can’t ask for much more than that." The film also received positive feedback upon its release from DVD & Blu-ray Review.
