= BritFilms =

British film website

BritFilms.tv is a popular British film website. Since its inception in 2006, it has grown steadily in popularity and, with over 100,000 monthly visitors, is a popular film website in the UK.

BritFilms differs from most British film websites and magazines as its approach is less populist. It reviews mainstream films, including Hollywood fare and art films. It also focuses on British films and foreign contributions.

As well as film news, previews and reviews, BritFilms has a short film channel.

== Short films ==
The short film channel, accessible for free on the site (registration not required), provides short films available for viewing that have been submitted by users. Instructions on how users can submit their own short films are available on the site. Channels for viewing films from the Bang! Short Film Festival are also provided.

The short films on the BritFilms site tend to fall into several categories, mainly:

- Live action short
- Animated short (hand-drawn or CGI)
- Documentary short subject
- Experimental or abstract short films
- Music videos

In 2007, BritFilms partnered with national cinema chain Cineworld to launch the popular Midland's based 24 Hour Film Challenge.

In addition, the BritFilms website includes film festival news, details of short film events in the UK and links to relevant online resources.
