= The Devil Is Human =

Single by Aurora
- Released: 8 July 2022
- Length: 3:01
- Label: Decca
- Songwriters: Aurora Aksnes; Fred Ball; Jin Jin
- Producers: Aurora; Magnus Skylstad

Aurora singles chronology
"Storm" (2022)	"The Devil Is Human" (2022)	"A Potion for Love" (2022)

"The Devil Is Human" is a song by Norwegian singer-songwriter Aurora. It was released on 8 July 2022, through Decca Records. Written by Aurora, Fred Ball and Jin Jin, the song was only included in vinyl edition of Aurora's fourth album, The Gods We Can Touch (2022).

== Background ==
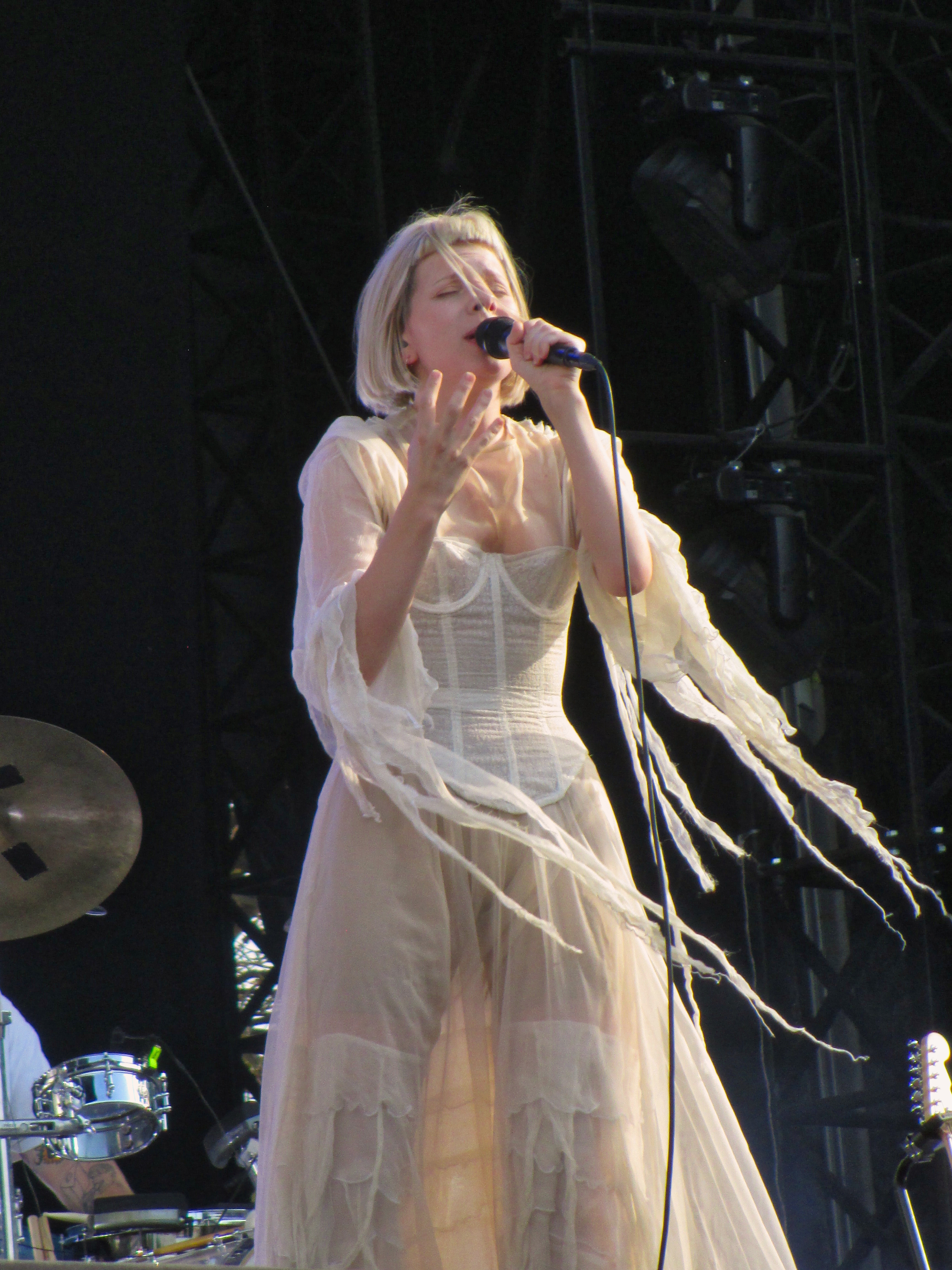
Aurora in 2022

In April 2022, Aurora performed a stripped-back cover of Harry Styles' 2019 single "Golden" from his album Fine Line (2019), during a BBC Radio 1's Piano Sessions appearance.

Aurora posted on Twitter to denounce societies' sexualisation of women, writing, "We get sexualised by the world, and yet shamed for being sexual". She then concluded with the hashtag #ourbodyourchoice, linking to the track "The Devil Is Human". Aurora described the song as addressing societal pressures on women and issues related to bodily autonomy, stating, "They want to possess you and own you, and even decide what you get to do with your own body. We are not free until all of us are free." She further highlighted historical and ongoing attempts to suppress strong, independent women, adding, "The world have tried for many years to burn women who were strong, who were brilliant, brave and free spirited. The devil is human, or apparently the devil is a woman. You can burn the skin we live in, but you cannot burn the witch away."

== Release ==
"The Devil Is Human" was originally included only on the vinyl edition of Aurora's fourth studio album, The Gods We Can Touch (2022), before being released as a standalone track.

== Composition ==
According to Mxdwn, "The Devil Is Human" features ethereal vocal delivery supported by ambient instrumental elements and sparse percussive textures. The song's arrangement employs atmospheric production techniques that align with the track's lyrical themes, while maintaining stylistic characteristics commonly associated with Aurora's work.

== Personnel ==
Credits were adapted from Tidal.

- Aurora – lead vocalist, producer, composer
- Fredrik Ball – producer, programmer
- Magnus Skylstad – producer, mixer, recording engineer
- Jin Jin – composer
- Alex Wharton – mastering engineer
