= The Gods We Can Touch =

- Standard cover

Studio album by Aurora
- Released: 21 January 2022
- Recorded: November 2019 – July 2021
- Studios: Barony Rosendal (Kvinnherad Municipality); The Office (Norway); The Jungle (Norway); Blanca Studio (Bergen)
- Genres: Electropop; folk-pop; ethereal; art pop; electro-folk; synth-pop
- Length: 49:55
- Labels: Decca; Glassnote
- Producers: Aurora; Magnus Skylstad; Matias Tellez

Aurora chronology
A Different Kind of Human (Step 2) (2019)	The Gods We Can Touch (2022)	What Happened to the Heart? (2024)

Singles from The Gods We Can Touch
- 1. "Exist for Love" Released: 14 May 2020; 2. "Cure for Me" Released: 7 July 2021; 3. "Giving In to the Love" Released: 14 October 2021; 4. "Heathens" Released: 2 December 2021; 5. "A Dangerous Thing" Released: 7 January 2022; 6. "A Temporary High" Released: 21 January 2022

The Gods We Can Touch is the fourth studio album by Norwegian singer-songwriter and record producer Aurora. It was released on 21 January 2022 by Decca and Glassnote Records. As in her other releases, Aurora worked with Magnus Skylstad and Askjell Solstrand, along with new collaborations with Jamie Hartman, Martin Sjølie and Matias Tellez on its production.

Conceived as a departure from the concept and sound of her previous works, The Gods We Can Touch has been characterised to be an electropop record, along with folk-pop, ethereal, art pop, electro-folk, and synth-pop. Its sound incorporates an eclectic and multifaceted style with electronic textures, Western elements, and intimate orchestrations. Inspired predominantly by Greek mythology, the lyrics explore themes of self-empowerment, abuse, heartbreak, morality and desire, with a maximal and introspective style. The Gods We Can Touch received critical acclaim upon release, with music critics praising its "ethereal" vocal performance and experimental musical direction. At the 2023 Spellemannprisen, the album received a total of three nominations, including Producer of the Year.

The Gods We Can Touch was supported by six singles, five of which were supplemented by music videos. "Exist for Love" was promoted by an online music festival organized by Aurora. "Cure for Me", "Giving In to the Love", and "Heathens" were released between October and December 2021. "A Dangerous Thing" and "Everything Matters", featuring French singer Pomme, were released as a double single. "A Temporary High" followed alongside the album's release. The record debuted atop the Norwegian albums chart as Aurora's second number-one album in Norway, while also reaching the top ten in Scotland, the United Kingdom, and the US Billboard Heatseekers Albums chart. To further promote the album, Aurora performed several songs at the concert film A Touch of the Divine and embarked on her fourth headlining concert tour titled The Gods We Can Touch Tour.

== Background and recording ==
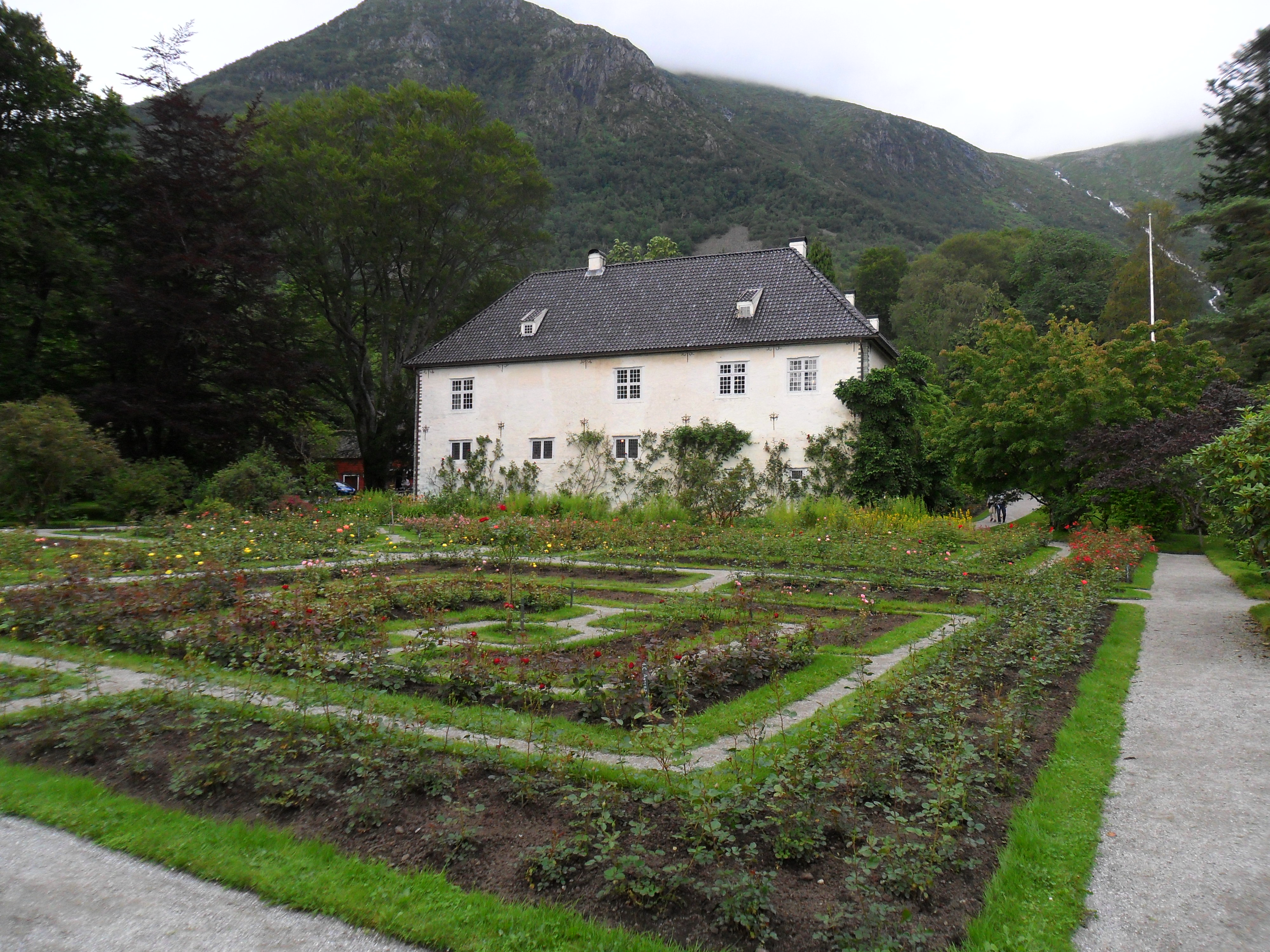
Aurora rented Barony Rosendal (pictured) in November 2020, where she recorded the majority of The Gods We Can Touch.

Aurora began writing songs for the album in January 2019, right after she chose the title for her new record. According to her, two days after the release of her second studio album A Different Kind of Human (Step 2) (2019), she already had planned what she wanted for her next project. During the writing process she read about the history of religion, which was a source of inspiration for the themes of the album.

Aurora stated in an interview with Billboard Japan that production for two upcoming albums began in November 2019, one of them being the yet-untitled The Gods We Can Touch. In an interview with Riff Magazine, she revealed that the closer album had a bigger perspective in comparison to her previous efforts, concluding that "it's an album for every individual within the big army of love." She further detailed the album in an interview with Motley, adding that it "will be dressed in an armour of hardness. But I'm also really exploring the soft, delicate part of me."

The first recorded song for the album was "Exist for Love", which was recorded in January 2020 at the Office in Norway, a month before the COVID-19 pandemic was declared in Norway. The track was made in collaboration with Isobel Waller-Bridge, who contributed with string arrangements. In November 2020, Aurora rented Barony Rosendal to record The Gods We Can Touch. Other recording locations included The Jungle and Blanca Studio, all located in Norway. In April 2021, Aurora's single "Runaway" began growing in popularity on TikTok. In an interview with NME regarding the song's newfound success, Aurora described the themes of the upcoming album: "I'm asking questions to everything that made us the way we are now; in our past, in politics, religion, and in weird ways of thought we have created that make no sense – like racism, not being a feminist or burning women for being witches. All of these strange things that we have convinced ourselves are the right thing to do, which is just so odd." She later stated in July 2021 that album was finished, and her intentions to release the album before the end of 2021.

== Music and lyrics ==
=== Overview ===
The Gods We Can Touch has been characterised to be an electropop record, along with folk-pop, ethereal, art pop, electro-folk, and synth-pop. The sound of the album incorporates an eclectic and multifaceted style, set with vast soundscapes, electronic textures, Western elements, intimate orchestrations, multiple layers, and textures. Musical influences of the record draws from a wide range of genres, such as jazz, chamber pop, global music, Latin music, and arena rock. Aurora classified the album as its own genre due to its "chaotic" and "genre blending" sound.

Marcy Donelson of AllMusic stated that "The Gods We Can Touch mixes natural, live-sounding vocals and acoustic instrumental performances with ethereal processed harmonies, drum machines, synthesizers, and various programming." The tracks "Exist for Love" and "Artemis" were the only songs recorded on first takes, which "commit[ted] to a more spontaneous sound." Aurora's sopranolike vocal performance throughout the album was described by many critics as "ethereal", with interludes to songs that showcase her voice and vocal tone shifts. Georgia Griffiths from The Music wrote that Aurora is "channelling Lana Del Rey, [and] the next it's Santigold" in her vocal performances on the record.

A concept album like Aurora's previous releases, The Gods We Can Touch deviates from the concepts found on her tribal-inspired album Infections of a Different Kind (Step 1) (2018) and its follow-up A Different Kind of Human (Step 2) (2019), in which she explored themes of empowerment, politics and ecological crisis. Described by her as "chapter three of my life", she revealed to be going to a more experimental direction with the album, and stated that it would not discuss themes like "doom, gloom, COVID and horror", instead of focusing on "more playful and fun" songs, whilst also referencing "a lot of things that bother [her] with society and our history". The lyrical themes are heavily inspired predominantly by Greek mythology, though Aurora acknowledged that some of them have references to Abrahamic and ancient Roman religions. Furthermore, the styles of lyrical writing have been described as dark and disturbing, with a maximal and introspective style. The lyrics throughout the songs of the record also talk about self-empowerment, abuse, heartbreak, morality and desire.

=== Songs ===
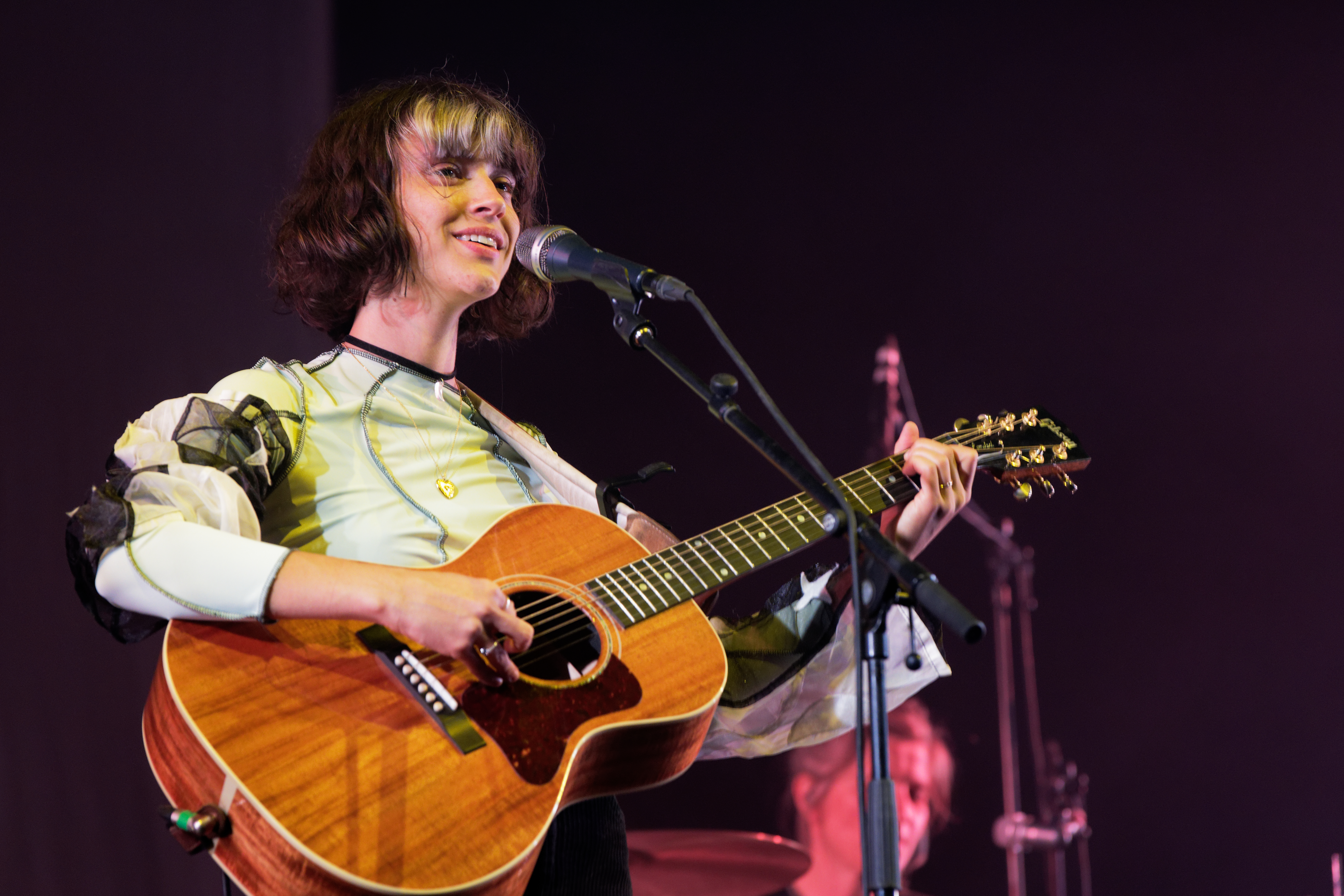
"Everything Matters", the second track on The Gods We Can Touch, features vocals from French singer Pomme, marking Aurora's first collaboration in one of her albums.

The Gods We Can Touch opens with "The Forbidden Fruits of Eden", an interlude that takes its title from the forbidden fruit of the Garden of Eden that appeared in the biblical book of Genesis. Composed of delicate harmonies, it "set[s] an explicitly religious tone" for the rest of the album. The electronica and chamber pop ballad "Everything Matters" features French singer-songwriter Pomme with an outro in French language. Inspired by the myth of Prometheus and the creation of humanity from clay, "Giving in to the Love", questions obsession with body image, while . It incorporates electropop and power pop genres and contains tom tom strikes, a drum machine and echoey synths. The baroque pop track "You Keep Me Crawling" deals with abuse of power in relationships where Aurora conveys "intensity and power in her vocals, while also showing vulnerability and softer moments."

Aurora called "Exist for Love" her first love song. It is a dreamy, retro-styled ballad accompanied by acoustic guitar and backing harmonies that moves into a soaring, strings-swept melody as she declares her love to her lover. The following track, "The Innocent", is an upbeat dance-pop and house song with a Latin rhythm that is accompanied by syncopated chordal piano, brass and pizzicato strings. Its production was described to be "harking back to the 1920s Jazz Age conventions, yet being undercut with a more current EDM feel." "Exhale Inhale", a stark contrast to the previous song, contains a folk-inspired sound. The track discusses the fear of several environmental issues "that awaits us" like wildfires and pollution. "A Temporary High" has an 1980s-influenced synth-pop sound that breaks into a thumping electro beat.

In "A Dangerous Thing", Aurora reflects on an abusive relationship, referencing the goddess of seduction Peitho, and showcases tone shifts from light harmonies to deeper verses. The dark sonority of the song is backed by an acoustic guitar, light chimes and minimal drumming. "Blood in the Wine" opens with a war cry reminiscent of The Good, the Bad and the Ugly against gentle acoustic guitar and thunderous percussion as it builds into a "collosus roar". An electropop track, which was compared to the music of Fleetwood Mac, "This Could Be a Dream" is a subdued ballad driven by "a flowing melody over a slow beat", piano, orchestral strings and trumpets that talks about "finding strength when you have nothing left to give." The Gods We Can Touch closes with the folk and orchestral pop cut "A Little Place Called the Moon". One of her favourite songs from the album, Aurora felt that it was the "perfect ending" for the album.

== Release and promotion ==
After clearing her Instagram feed in May 2020, Aurora began hinting at "the beginning of a new era". She initially expected to release the album in that year but she revealed in a September 2020 interview her decision to postpone it due to the COVID-19 pandemic. The next year, the album was delayed to early 2022, following the commercial success of her 2015 single "Runaway". On 14 October 2021, she revealed the album's name and track listing.

In July 2020 Aurora organized the Exist for Love Sessions, an online music festival that promoted various emerging artists. She later appeared at the Late Night with Seth Meyers in November 2021, her first performance at that show since 2018. In promotion of the album's release in the United Kingdom, Aurora performed at two sold-out shows in London. She was also interviewed by Norwegian TV host Anne Lindmo and performed "A Temporary High" in her talk show Lindmo, which was broadcast by NRK.

=== Singles ===
Aurora decided to release "Exist for Love" as the album's first single on 14 May 2020 because she felt "the world needs more love than ever". "Cure for Me" was released as The Gods We Can Touch's next single on 7 July 2021.

On 14 October, she released "Giving In to the Love" as the album's next single, and officially announced The Gods We Can Touch, and its release date of 21 January 2022. On 2 December, she released "Heathens" as the album's fourth single. "A Dangerous Thing" was released as a double single on 7 January 2022 with "Everything Matters", featuring French singer Pomme, as a B-side. The latter song was released as a promotional single only.

"A Temporary High" served as the sixth single, released on 21 January 2022, alongside the album's release. A music video was released on 27 January 2022.

=== Concert film and tour ===
On 3 December 2021, Aurora announced a virtual concert film titled A Touch of the Divine, released exclusively to Moment House on 25 January 2022, a week later after the album was released. It was directed by Alexandra Green and produced by Bullion Productions and Mercury Studios. A teaser was posted on 18 January 2022, while an official trailer was released two days later. Described as a "worldwide digital experience", the film included six songs from the album that were accompanied by choreography and interludes spoken by Aurora herself.

The album received further promotion from her fifth headlining concert tour, The Gods We Can Touch, which was announced on 9 July 2021.

=== Usage in media ===
The fourth track of the album, "Cure for Me" is part of the main soundtrack of Just Dance 2024 Edition.

== Critical reception ==
Professional ratings
Aggregate scores
Source	Rating
AnyDecentMusic?	7.9/10
Metacritic	81/100
Review scores
Source	Rating
AllMusic	4/5 stars
Clash	8/10
DIY	4/5 stars
Dork	4/5 stars
Gigwise	7/10 stars
The Line of Best Fit	9/10
MusicOMH	4.5/5 stars
NME	4/5 stars
NRK P3	5/6
Under the Radar	8/10 stars

The Gods We Can Touch was met with critical acclaim upon release. At Metacritic, which assigns a normalised score out of 100 to ratings from publications, the album received a mean score of 81 based on 9 reviews, indicating "universal acclaim".

The Line of Best Fit writer Tom Williams praised the album as an "ethereal masterpiece" and stated that Aurora's sound is "like heaven on Earth." Steven Loftin of Dork called Aurora on the album "exciting as she is intriguing" and makes the "world feels like a better place." Clash's Finlay Holden called the record "high-reaching" and noted that the themes of "angry, celebratory, wallowing and cathartic energies exhibit themselves in a maximalist way." Ben Hogwood from MusicOMH states that the record consisted of "futuristic production and intriguing, sometimes daring melodies" despite being rooted in a "deep and very distant past."

Chris Hamilton-Peach of DIY writes that "Aurora's celestial spark remains her calling card" on the album. Gigwise writer Tom Taylor sees Aurora as she "experiments with genre in her joyful new album" while also being reliant on "high-energy, electro-pop anthems." Andrew Trendell of NME notes that the record "seizes the opportunity to take the world on and fight with all her power" and is loaded with "idiosyncratic quirks and enchanting notions." Hayden Godfrey from Under the Radar felt that the record showcases Aurora's "glorious highs and careful lows" towards the production. According to Marcy Donelson from AllMusic, the record only expands on Aurora's "already mystical bearing."

== Awards and nominations ==
Year	Award	Category	Result	Ref.
2023	Spellemannprisen	Producer of the Year (with Magnus Skylstad)	Nominated	
2023	Spellemannprisen	Pop	Nominated	

== Commercial performance ==
Upon its release, the album became the third most-streamed album debut on Spotify that week with over 60 million streams on the platform. The album debuted atop the Norwegian VG-lista Topp 40 Album with first-week sales of 2,300 units, marking Aurora's second number one on the chart. In the United Kingdom, the record peaked at number eight on the UK Albums Chart with 4,000 album-equivalent units, earning her first top 10 in the country.

== Track listing ==
All tracks produced by Aurora and Magnus Skylstad, except where noted.

The Gods We Can Touch – standard edition
No.	Title	Writer(s)	Producer(s)	Length
1.	"The Forbidden Fruits of Eden"	Aurora Aksnes		0:40
2.	"Everything Matters" (featuring Pomme)	Aksnes; Claire Pommet; Jamie Hartman	Aurora; Magnus Skylstad; Hartman^{[a]}	3:33
3.	"Giving In to the Love"	Aksnes; Skylstad		3:01
4.	"Cure for Me"	Aksnes; Skylstad		3:21
5.	"You Keep Me Crawling"	Aksnes; Skylstad		2:59
6.	"Exist for Love"	Aksnes; Glen Roberts; Skylstad		4:10
7.	"Heathens"	Aksnes; Skylstad; Odd Martin Skålnes		3:45
8.	"The Innocent"	Aksnes; Roberts; Skylstad		3:27
9.	"Exhale Inhale"	Aksnes; Roberts; Skylstad		3:32
10.	"A Temporary High"	Aksnes; Skylstad		3:23
11.	"A Dangerous Thing"	Aksnes; Martin Sjølie	Aurora; Skylstad; Sjølie^{[a]}	3:35
12.	"Artemis"	Aksnes		2:38
13.	"Blood in the Wine"	Aksnes; Askjell Solstrand; Fredrik Svabø	Aurora; Askjell^{[a]}; Skylstad^{[a]}	3:29
14.	"This Could Be a Dream"	Aksnes; Skylstad		4:08
15.	"A Little Place Called the Moon"	Aksnes; Matias Tellez	Aurora; Tellez	4:10
Total length:				49:55

The Gods We Can Touch – Japanese edition bonus track
No.	Title	Writer(s)	Producer(s)	Length
16.	"Cure for Me" (Acoustic)	Aksnes; Skylstad	Aurora; Skylstad; Svabø	3:33
Total length:				53:29

The Gods We Can Touch – Spotify bonus track
No.	Title	Writer(s)	Producer(s)	Length
16.	"The Woman I Am"	Aksnes; Roberts; Skylstad	Aurora; Skylstad	3:12
Total length:				53:08

The Gods We Can Touch – alternative vinyl edition
No.	Title	Writer(s)	Producer(s)	Length
1.	"The Forbidden Fruits of Eden"	Aksnes		0:40
2.	"Cure for Me"	Aksnes; Skylstad		3:21
3.	"The Innocent"	Aksnes; Roberts; Skylstad		3:27
4.	"A Dangerous Thing"	Aksnes; Sjølie	Aurora; Skylstad; Sjølie^{[a]}	3:35
5.	"Exist for Love"	Aksnes; Roberts; Skylstad		4:13
6.	"Heathens"	Aksnes; Skylstad; Skålnes		3:45
7.	"Blood in the Wine"	Aksnes; Solstrand; Svabø	Aurora; Askjell^{[a]}; Skylstad^{[a]}	3:29
8.	"Exhale Inhale"	Aksnes; Roberts; Skylstad		3:32
9.	"A Temporary High"	Aksnes; Skylstad		3:23
10.	"The Woman I Am"	Aksnes; Roberts; Skylstad	Aurora; Skylstad	3:12
11.	"This Could Be a Dream"	Aksnes; Skylstad		4:08
12.	"Artemis"	Aksnes		2:38
13.	"The Devil Is Human"	Aksnes; Janée Bennett; Fredrik Ball	Aurora; Skylstad; Ball	3:01
14.	"Everything Matters" (featuring Pomme)	Aksnes; Claire Pommet; Hartman	Aurora; Skylstad; Hartman^{[a]}	3:33
15.	"A Little Place Called the Moon"	Aksnes; Tellez	Aurora; Tellez	4:10
Total length:				49:44

The Gods We Can Touch – Japanese special edition (disc 2)
No.	Title	Writer(s)	Producer(s)	Length
1.	"The Woman I Am"	Aksnes; Roberts; Skylstad	Aurora; Skylstad	3:12
2.	"The Devil Is Human"	Aksnes; Bennett; Ball	Aurora; Skylstad; Ball	3:01
3.	"A Potion for Love"	Aksnes; Langebæk	Aurora; Skylstad	3:36
4.	"Storm" (with Wu Qing-feng; English version)	Aksnes; Howe Chen; Roberts; Skylstad; Wu Qing-feng	Howe Chen; Skylstad; Wu Qing-feng	3:51
5.	"Hunting Shadows" (Assassin's Creed)	Aksnes; Even Kjelby; Jesper Kyd	Aurora; Kjelby	2:55
6.	"Runaway" (piano version)	Aksnes; Skylstad	Skålnes; Skylstad	4:47
7.	"A Temporary High" (acoustic)	Aksnes; Skylstad		2:50
8.	"A Potion for Love" (Vevo session)	Aksnes; Langebæk	Aurora; Skylstad	3:19
9.	"Exhale Inhale" (Vevo session)	Aksnes; Roberts; Skylstad		4:00
10.	"Exist for Love" (live from Supersonic 2021)	Aksnes; Roberts; Skylstad		4:48
Total length:				36:22

Notes

- ^{^a} signifies a co-producer.
- Vinyl releases of the album that include the alternative track listing have different versions of some of its tracks.

== Personnel ==
Credits adapted from the CD liner notes.

Musicians

- Aurora Aksnes – vocals (all tracks); piano (tracks 2, 11); percussion (tracks 3, 5, 7); synthesizer (tracks 4, 7); organ (track 4)
- Magnus Skylstad – synth bass (tracks 1, 3); synthesizer (tracks 1, 4, 6); organ (track 3); drums (tracks 3–4, 6–7); bass (tracks 4, 6–7); synth pads (tracks 6–7), strings (track 7); percussion (track 7, 11); baritone guitar, piano (track 11)
- Fredrik Svabø – guitar (tracks 2–3, 7); acoustic guitar (tracks 5, 11)
- Askjell Solstrand – piano (tracks 2, 13); co-production (track 13)
- Pomme – vocals (track 2)
- Alexander von Mehren – drum machine (tracks 4, 14)
- Isobel Waller-Bridge – string arrangement (track 6)
- Glen Roberts – acoustic guitar (track 6)
- Maddie Cutter – cello (track 6)
- Galya Bisengalieva – violin, viola (track 6)
- Odd Martin Skålnes – guitar, percussion (track 7)
- Martin Sjølie – electric guitar, drums, bass (track 11)
- Matias Tellez – guitar, synthesizer (track 15)
- Per Arne Glorvigen – bandoneon (track 12)

Technical

- Aurora – production (all tracks)
- Magnus Skylstad – production (tracks 1–14); programming (tracks 2, 4, 6–7); engineering (tracks 2, 4, 7, 11), mixing, recording engineer (track 3)
- Jamie Hartman – production (track 2)
- Martin Sjølie – co-production (track 11)
- Alex Whartman – mastering (all tracks)
- Josh Gudwin – mixing (track 4)
- Robin Schmidt – mastering (track 6)

Design

- Aurora – art direction
- Leif Podhajsky – art direction, artwork, package design
- Xin Li – photography

== Charts ==
Chart performance for The Gods We Can Touch
Chart (2022)	Peak position
Australian Albums (ARIA)	100
Austrian Albums (Ö3 Austria)	24
Belgian Albums (Ultratop Flanders)	25
Belgian Albums (Ultratop Wallonia)	29
Dutch Albums (Album Top 100)	28
Finnish Albums (Suomen virallinen lista)	47
French Albums (SNEP)	56
German Albums (Offizielle Top 100)	11
Norwegian Albums (VG-lista)	1
Polish Albums (ZPAV)	31
Scottish Albums (Official Charts)	7
Slovak Albums (ČNS IFPI)	70
Spanish Albums (Promusicae)	53
Swiss Albums (Schweizer Hitparade)	16
UK Albums (Official Charts)	8
US Heatseekers Albums (Billboard)	6
US Top Current Album Sales (Billboard)	56

== Certifications ==
Certifications for The Gods We Can Touch
Region	Certification	Certified units/sales
United Kingdom	—	24,220
Streaming
Greater China	—	350,000,000

== Release history ==
Release dates and formats for The Gods We Can Touch
Region	Date	Format(s)	Label	Edition	Ref.
Various	21 January 2022	Digital download; streaming	Decca; Glassnote	Standard	
Various	21 January 2022	CD; LP; cassette	Decca; Glassnote	Standard	
Japan	21 January 2022	CD	Universal Music Japan	Japan bonus	
Japan	18 January 2023	CD	Universal Music Japan	Japan Special	

== See also ==
- List of number-one albums in Norway
