= A Dangerous Thing =

2022 single by Aurora

Single by Aurora

from the album The Gods We Can Touch
- B-side: "Everything Matters"
- Released: 7 January 2022
- Genre: Folk
- Length: 3:35
- Label: Decca; Glassnote
- Songwriters: Aurora Aksnes; Martin Sjølie
- Producers: Aurora Aksnes; Magnus Skylstad

Aurora singles chronology
"Heathens" (2021)	"A Dangerous Thing" (2022)	"A Temporary High" (2022)

Lyric video
- "A Dangerous Thing" on YouTube

"A Dangerous Thing" is a song by Norwegian singer-songwriter Aurora for her fourth studio album, The Gods We Can Touch (2022). It was released on 7 January 2022, through Decca and Glassnote, as the fifth single from the album.

== Background ==
"A Dangerous Thing" was produced by Aurora, Magnus Skylstad, and co-produced by Martin Sjølie. Speaking about the track, Aurora reflected on the way beauty can sometimes disguise something harmful, stating, "I was surprised to learn how often the ugly is disguised as beauty. How often poison is disguised as wine. And life disguised as death."

== Composition ==
The song is a folk ballad, that has elements of country. It explores the theme of self-awareness within a deceptive and destructive relationship, portraying how people often return to what is familiar, even when it is harmful. Aurora collaborated with producers Martin Sjølie and Magnus Skylstad to create the song's atmospheric and adventurous soundscape. She described the concept as "seductive, yet destructive—a dangerous thing indeed."
