= The Woman I Am (song) =

2022 single by Aurora

Single by Aurora
- Released: 4 April 2022
- Genre: Pop
- Length: 3:12
- Label: Decca; Glassnote
- Songwriter: Aurora Aksnes
- Producer: Magnus Skylstad

Aurora singles chronology
"A Temporary High" (2022)	"The Woman I Am" (2022)	"Storm" (2022)

Visualiser
- "The Woman I Am" on YouTube

"The Woman I Am" is a song by Norwegian singer-songwriter Aurora. It was released on 4 April 2022, through Decca and Glassnote. The song was later included in her fourth studio album, The Gods We Can Touch (2022). The song was BBC Radio 1's Future Sounds' "Hottest Record" on the day of release.

== Background and composition ==
"This is an ode to feminine divinity. It's not always easy to find your place in this world made for men, as a woman. To find yourself. To learn that you are a source of life, of power, craft, thought and love. Not only a vessel. You do not exist for the pleasure of others, you exist for yourself. Even beyond your body, your beauty, your intellect and your accomplishments, there is a woman who is worthy of this world; believe in her. And know her worth with every breath you take. And then maybe one day the world will be in harmony. And balance. But only in the arms of equality."

— Aurora, talking about the song's theme

In a statement about "The Woman I Am", Aurora described it as an exploration of the challenges women face in a male-dominated world, emphasising self-worth beyond physical appearance, intellect, and achievements. She expressed hope that recognising this worth could lead to greater harmony and equality. The track is a pop song, written as an ode to feminine divinity.

Beyond her music, Aurora had been actively engaged in discussions on climate change. She was announced as a guest on Fay Milton's Sounds Like a Plan podcast, where she would discuss how the music industry is addressing the climate crisis. Additionally, she was scheduled to participate in a conversation with Brian Eno in London on April 29, focusing on how music can be harnessed for environmental benefit.

== Release and promotion ==
"The Woman I Am" follows the release of Aurora's fourth studio album, The Gods We Can Touch, in January. The single was set to be included in the album's deluxe edition. After the single's release, Aurora performed the song at the 2022 Gullruten Awards.
