= A Temporary High =

2022 single by Aurora

Single by Aurora

from the album The Gods We Can Touch
- Released: 21 January 2022
- Length: 3:23
- Label: Decca; Glassnote
- Songwriters: Aurora Aksnes; Magnus Skylstad
- Producers: Aurora; Magnus Skylstad

Aurora singles chronology
"A Dangerous Thing" (2022)	"A Temporary High" (2022)	"The Woman I Am" (2022)

Music video
- "A Temporary High" on YouTube

"A Temporary High" is a song by Norwegian singer-songwriter Aurora for her fourth studio album, The Gods We Can Touch (2022). It was released on 21 January 2022, through Decca and Glassnote, as the sixth and final single from the album.

== Background ==
"A Temporary High" served as the sixth single, released on 21 January 2022, alongside the album's release. In an interview with Apple Music, Aurora said the song was inspired by a complex woman who embodies elusiveness across time. The track aligns with the broader themes of The Gods We Can Touch, which blends divine and human elements, drawing from Greek mythology. Speaking with Official Charts, Aurora expressed her belief in embracing imperfection and individuality: "Maybe we're just tired of being suppressed? It's time for us to unleash the full potential of ourselves and our experience of this beautiful life, where we don't have to fight for the right to exist."

== Music video ==
The music video for "A Temporary High", directed by Sigurd Fossen, explores themes of time and human connection. Aurora appears under shifting lights and within crowds, evoking a sense of search and isolation. The image of her watching sand fall through an hourglass recurs, symbolizing the fleeting nature of time and echoing the song's lyrics.

== Charts ==
Weekly chart performance for "A Temporary High"
Chart (2023)	Peak position
UK Singles Sales (OCC)	71
UK Physical Singles (OCC)	11
UK Vinyl Singles (OCC)	8
