= Exist for Love =

2020 single by Aurora

Single by Aurora

from the album The Gods We Can Touch
- Released: 14 May 2020
- Recorded: 2017–2020
- Length: 4:10
- Label: Decca; Glassnote
- Songwriters: Aurora Aksnes; Roberts Glen Joseph; Magnus Skylstad
- Producers: Aurora Aksnes; Magnus Skylstad

Aurora singles chronology
"Into the Unknown" (2019)	"Exist for Love" (2020)	"The Secret Garden" (2020)

Music video
- "Exist for Love" on YouTube

"Exist for Love" is a song by Norwegian singer-songwriter Aurora for her fourth studio album, The Gods We Can Touch (2022). It was released on 14 May 2020, through Decca and Glassnote, as the lead single from the album.

== Background ==
Earlier in the year, Aurora performed Frozen 2's "Into the Unknown" alongside Idina Menzel at the Academy Awards. She later shared a behind-the-scenes look at her experience at the event.

On May 11, prior to the announcement of "Exist for Love", a love song that is retro-styled ballad, accompanied by acoustic guitar and backing harmonies that moves into a soaring, strings-swept melody as she declares her love to her lover, Aurora hinted at a new phase in her career by sharing a handwritten note with fans. In the note, she expressed that "the world needs more love than ever," reflecting the song's central theme.

The song gained some traction after rapper and singer Doja Cat reacted to it on an Instagram live stream.

== Charts ==
Chart performance for "Exist for Love"
Chart (2020)	Peak position
UK Physical Singles (OCC)	49

== Certifications ==
Certifications for "Exist for Love"
Region	Certification	Certified units/sales
Brazil (Pro-Música Brasil)	Gold	20,000^{‡}
^{‡} Sales+streaming figures based on certification alone.
