= Cure for Me =

2021 single by Aurora

Single by Aurora

from the album The Gods We Can Touch
- B-side: "A Potion for Love"
- Written: 2019
- Released: 7 July 2021
- Studio: Barony Rosendal (Kvinnherad Municipality)
- Genre: Electropop; disco; Europop; dance-pop
- Length: 3:21
- Label: Decca; Glassnote
- Songwriters: Aurora Aksnes; Magnus Skylstad
- Producers: Aurora; Magnus Skylstad

Aurora singles chronology
"Sofia" (2021)	"Cure for Me" (2021)	"Giving In to the Love" (2021)

Music video
- "Cure for Me" on YouTube

"Cure for Me" is a song by Norwegian singer-songwriter Aurora for her fourth studio album, The Gods We Can Touch (2022). It was released on 7 July 2021, through Decca and Glassnote, as the second single from the album. An electropop, disco, Europop, and dance-pop song with elements of EDM music, it interpolates "Aquarela do Brasil", written by Brazilian composer Ary Barroso. The song was inspired by conversion therapy and the LGBT community, discussing how people "don't need a cure" for being themselves. Aurora and Magnus Skylstad wrote and produced "Cure for Me".

"Cure for Me" received positive reviews from music critics, who praised the song's empowering message and deemed the production as carnivalesque. Some of them viewed it as a playful departure from Aurora's previous material and compared the song to the works of Madonna. Commercially, the song reached minor chart placements, including the top 20 in Russia, Mexico, and the UK Physical Singles chart. It was certified platinum in Brazil by Pro-Música Brasil.

Aurora directed the music video for "Cure for Me" with Sigurd Fossen, in which the former performs a choreography with masked dancers. An acoustic version and Brazilian DJ Vintage Culture remixes were released on 6 and 27 August 2023, respectively. A live performance with Mexican musician Silvana Estrada, recorded in November 2021 in Mexico City, was released for streaming on 21 June 2023.

== Background and development ==
Aurora, a bisexual woman, (Note: Despite having relationships with both men and women throughout her life, Aurora previously preferred to be included as part of the unlabeled community. However, she currently identifies as bisexual.) has been a vocal supporter of LGBT rights. She first showed her support for the community with the release of her 2018 single "Queendom", an empowerment song that was classified as a queer anthem. The song's music video, which was dedicated to her LGBT fans, includes a scene where Aurora kisses one of her female dancers to convey that "every type of love is accepted and embraced" in her "queendom".

The song "Cure for Me" was written in Australia, during Aurora's 2019 tour, before she thought of making music intended for her fourth studio album. She rented a studio there with producer Magnus Skylstad for the writing sessions. The first song she finished writing from The Gods We Can Touch, it was written before the singer figured out the concept for the album with the completion of the lead single "Exist for Love". "Cure for Me", alongside the majority of the album, was recorded on Barony Rosendal, a manor house located in Kvinnherad Municipality, Norway. The song was mastered by Alex Wharton and mixed by Josh Gudwin. In an interview with Zane Lowe on Apple Music 1, Aurora revealed that they "had so much fun" when working on the song because she embraced "the playful part in making music," something she said that is not common to her because she considers her usual process of making music as "sad" and "serious".

== Composition and lyrics ==
"Cure for Me" is an electropop, disco, Europop, and dance-pop song with elements of EDM music. Its "theatrical" production includes an upbeat, arcade-sounding melody, featuring synth-driven electronic beats. "Cure for Me" interpolates the melody from "Aquarela do Brasil", written by Brazilian composer Ary Barroso; Aurora stated that she found inspiration from Brazilian music when composing the song as she has "a lot of gay fans" in the country. The song is moderately fast at 119 beats per minute and is played in the key of F♯ minor. Aurora's vocals range between A_{3} to C♯_{5}. Nick Reilly of Rolling Stone UK noted that the song is "wrapped up in a dancefloor-primed banger." The song opens with the singer's "soft yet soaring" vocals as it develops to a scale-spanning refrain backed by pulsing synthesizers, where she repeatedly sings "No, I don't need a cure for me".

Multiple critics noted that the song's club-influenced production marked a significant departure from her previous musical style. Roman Gokhman from Riff Magazine described "Cure for Me" as a "90s-era Madonna-esque club banger." Andrew Trendell of NME also compared the song to Madonna's music, which he viewed as a stark contrast to the folk-pop sound critics used to classify her third studio album A Different Kind of Human (Step 2). Matt Hobbs of God Is in the TV wrote that it was an unorthodox song for the singer, further describing it as "audaciously flamenco-flavoured pop". Aurora said that, while "Cure for Me" is stylistically different to the other songs of the album, she stated that they share in common the experimentation "with new things and new sides of me".

Described by critics as "introspective" and "inquisitive", the song is heavily inspired by the pseudoscientific practice of conversion therapy, used against LGBT individuals and the misconception that they need to "be cured". When Aurora was writing the song, she was saddened by the fact that conversion therapy is still allowed in several countries, including Norway. (Note: At the time Aurora wrote the song, conversion therapy was legal in Norway until December 2023, when the Parliament of Norway passed a law banning conversion therapy practices with sentences up to six years of imprisonment for the most serious cases.) Since Aurora thought the idea that people need to "be cured" because of their appearance, feelings, or sexual orientation as "pointless", she wrote the song to challenge "those who inflict shame on people perceived to be different". She also stated that, while "Cure for Me" is dedicated to the LGBT community, it is also directed to anyone that has felt excluded from others. Although the singer admitted that she lacked a sense of belonging when growing up, she added that the support of her fans helped her feel closer to other people. Despite the dark nature of the song, she called it a "very fun little guy [sic]". As The Gods We Can Touch is heavily inspired by Greek mythology, Aurora said that she thought of Panacea, the goddess of remedy, when writing the song.

== Release and promotion ==
Following the release of "Exist for Love" in May 2020, Aurora planned to release another song but postponed it as she thought that "there were other voices that needed to be heard" at the time, referring to the Black Lives Matter movement. After "Cure for Me" was recorded, Aurora's team noted the song's potential as a single and decided to release it. It was scheduled for release on 16 April 2021 but was pushed back to July because of the unexpected success of Aurora's 2015 single "Runaway" at that time. This led the singer to release a series of compilation EPs as the song received over 100 million streams in Spotify. Aurora officially announced the song's release on 30 June 2021 alongside the message "May there never be a cure for human nature." She also shared the cover art, which depicts her sitting "in a trippy, black-and-white-tiled room" while holding a court jester mask close to her face.

"Cure for Me" was released to digital download and streaming media on 7 July 2021, as the second single from The Gods We Can Touch. The song was released on a limited edition 7-inch vinyl, along with the song "A Potion for Love" as the B-side on 9 July 2021, and was sold exclusively through her official store. Additionally, it was serviced to Italian and French radio airplay on 16 and 18 July, respectively. An acoustic version of "Cure for Me" was released on 6 August 2021, while two remixes by Brazilian DJ Vintage Culture followed on 27 August. The former was later included as a bonus track on the Japanese editions of The Gods We Can Touch. An extended play (EP), which includes the original song and its alternative versions, was released on 31 October and 11 November 2022.

A video game was also released to promote the song. In it, the player controls Aurora, who must collect apples and avoid hitting masks to achieve a higher score. The gameplay clip for the game, which was first placed as a trailer for the music video for "Cure for Me", is currently used for a visualiser on YouTube, released on 14 July 2021. Two lyrics videos, with one of them signed in British Sign Language, were released on 16 July 2021 and 13 August 2021, respectively.

== Critical reception ==
"Cure for Me" was met with positive reviews from music critics. Cerys Kenneally writing for The Line of Best Fit described the song as "carnivalesque". Jessica Fynn of Clash deemed it "an exploration of sorts, a Tiresian venture into the carnivalesque." Finlay Holden, another writer of the magazine, said "Cure for Me" was "the crux of the album", viewing it as "dark" and "moody". Aleksandra Brzezicka perceived the song to be "a playful spin on a very serious subject." Hayden Godfrey for Under the Radar defined the song as a "dancy anthem that rails against conversion therapy, [...] almost overshadowed by its catchy and agile melodies." Steven Giles of Renowned for Sound viewed it as "encouraging to see such a powerful message attached to a powerful, melodic euphoria." "Cure for Me" appeared in an unranked list by NPR's Sheldon Pearce of songs that were released in 2021 but became popular in 2022.

== Music video ==
A music video for "Cure for Me" was released a day after the single. The video was directed by Aurora and Sigurd Fossen. A behind-the-scenes clip followed on 26 July 2021. It opens with Aurora retiring a mask from her face as she begins to dance with various masked dancers. In one of the scenes, she takes an apple, referencing Eve and the forbidden fruit. The dance moves were inspired by the 1920s and the Futterwacken, a dance taken from the 2010 film Alice in Wonderland. A dance tutorial video was uploaded to her YouTube channel on 15 July 2021. On 22 September 2022, Universal Music Korea uploaded a Korean-subtitled version of the music video that featured different opening sequences from the original one. To promote the music video, Aurora did a pre-premiere and a YouTube Premium-exclusive afterparty livestreams before and after its release, respectively. In late 2022, the clip's choreography went viral on TikTok, with users imitating the dance moves. Describing the clip as "whimsical, masquerade-like", Marni Zipper of Audacy thought that it "gets the feeling that the singer is in on the inside joke". The video has 121 million views on YouTube as of March 2024

== Live performances and usage in media ==
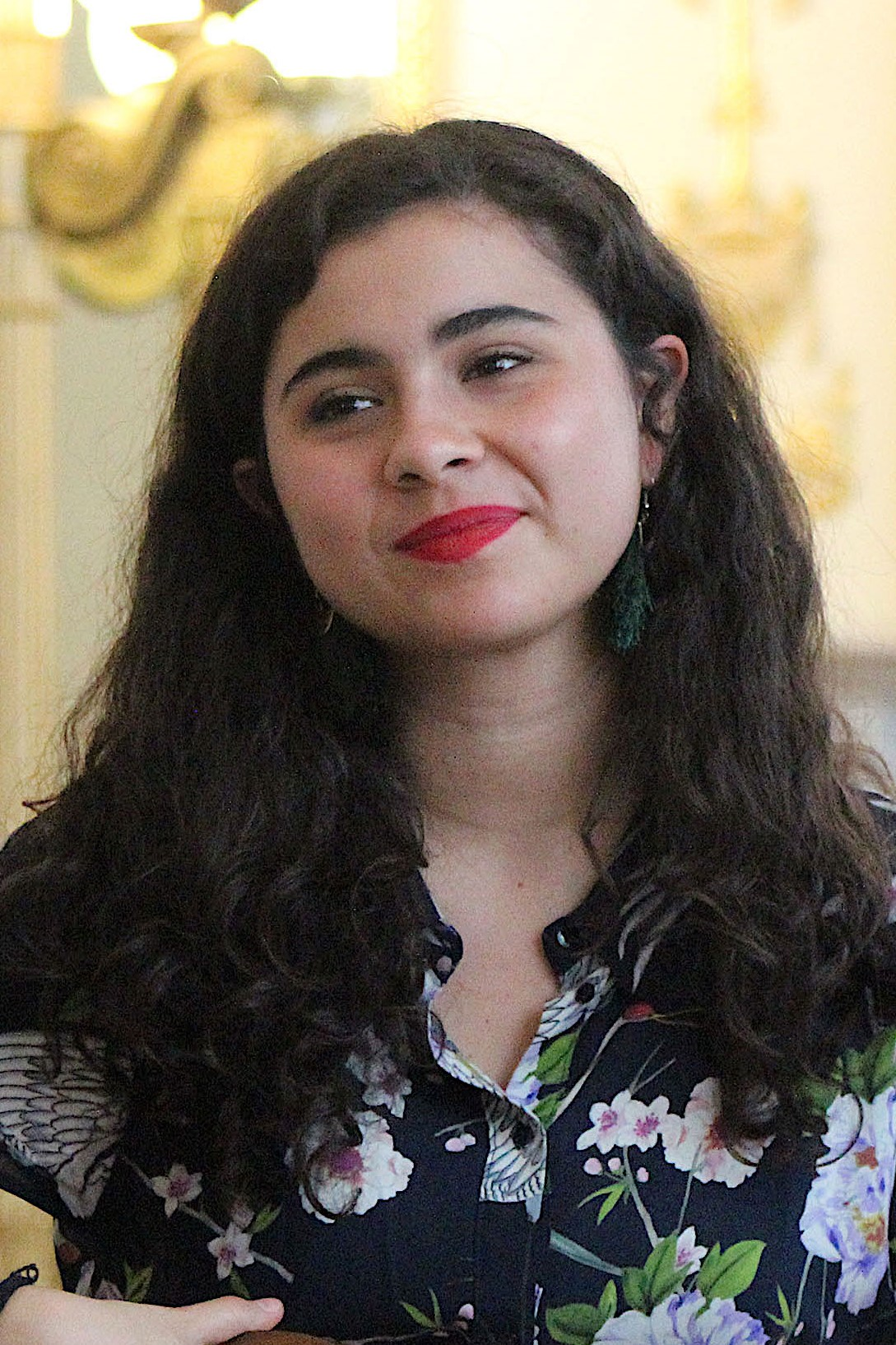
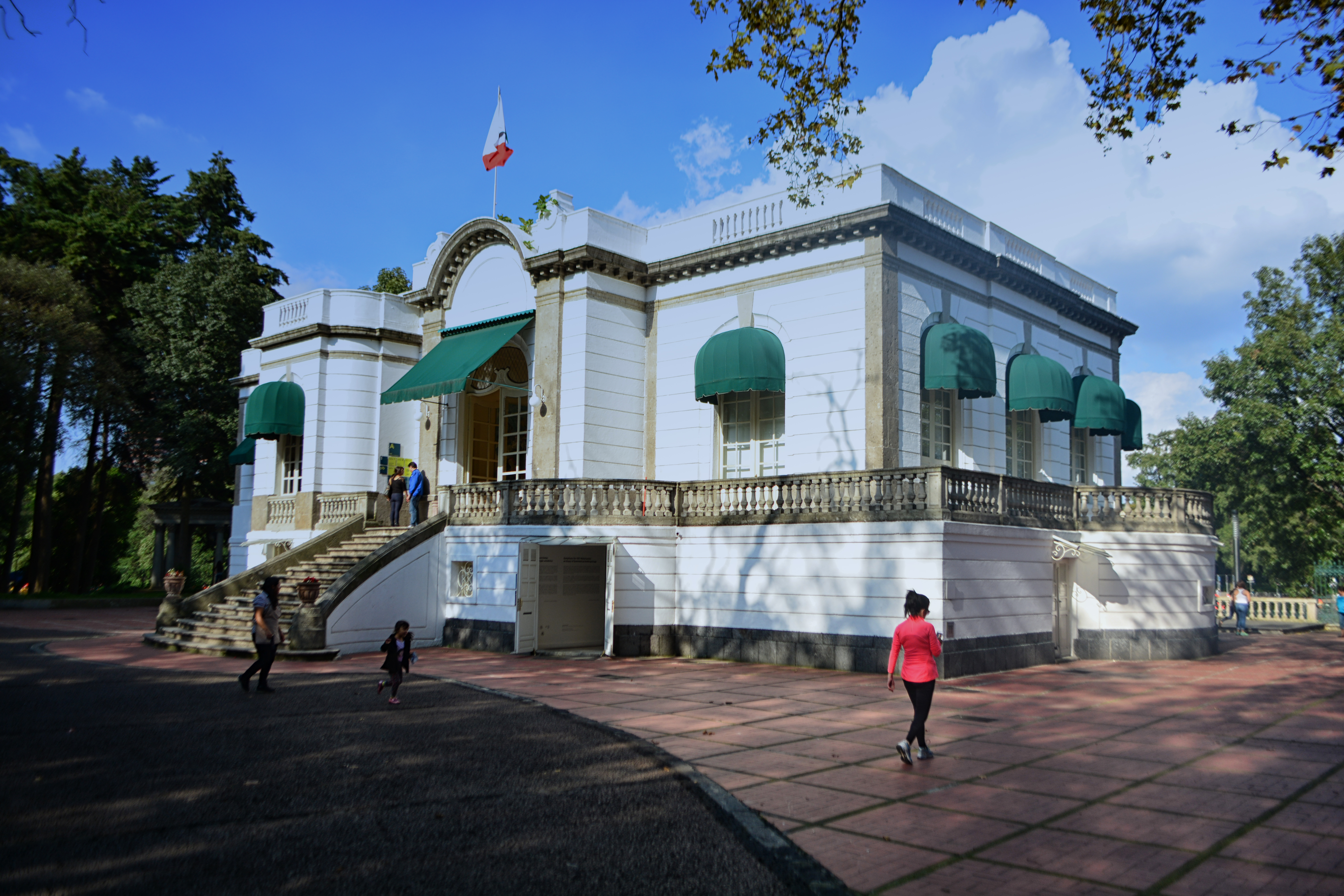
Aurora performed a live session of "Cure for Me" with Silvana Estrada at the Casa del Lago Juan José Arreola, Mexico City.

Aurora performed "Cure for Me" for the first time at the Splendour in the Grass festival on 24 July 2021. It was later uploaded to YouTube a month later. On 21 November 2021, the singer sang "Cure for Me" at the 2021 Corona Capital. She performed the song at the 2021 P3 Gull Awards on 27 November, accompanied by various dancers. On 24 February 2022, Aurora sang the song during a Tiktok live stream in collaboration with Groovy Gecko to celebrate LGBT History Month in the United Kingdom. She included it in the set list of a 2022–2023 world tour in support of The Gods We Can Touch.

During her stay in Mexico for Corona Capital 2021, Aurora performed a duet of the song with Mexican musician Silvana Estrada at Casa del Lago Juan José Arreola, Mexico City. Organized by the Music Tourism Office of the city, led by Renee Mooi, the collaboration was made possible as both artists are signed to Glassnote Records. For this performance, Estrada translated part of the song to Spanish. The session was filmed and a video, directed by Darío Celestinos, was uploaded to Estrada's YouTube channel on 11 April 2023. The clip begins with a behind-the-scenes where both performers practice the song before singing it to the public. The duet with Estrada was released for streaming on 21 and 23 June 2023.

"Cure for Me" appears as part of the track list for Just Dance 2024 Edition. American singer Kelly Clarkson performed a live cover of the song on The Kelly Clarkson Show on 23 January 2024. An emote based on the dance performed in the music video, including part of the song itself, was added to the game Fortnite on 13 February 2024.

== Track listing ==
- Digital download / streaming
1. "Cure for Me" – 3:21
- Digital download / streaming – Acoustic
1. "Cure for Me" (Acoustic) – 3:33
- 7-inch single
1. "Cure for Me" – 3:21
2. "A Potion for Love" – 3:36
- Digital download / streaming – Vintage Culture Remix
1. "Cure for Me" (Vintage Culture Remix) – 3:30
- Digital download / streaming – Vintage Culture Extended Remix
1. "Runaway" (Vintage Culture Extended Remix) – 5:28
- Digital download / streaming – Cure for Me EP
1. "Cure for Me" – 3:21
2. "Cure for Me" (Acoustic) – 3:33
3. "Cure for Me" (Vintage Culture Remix) – 3:30
4. "Cure for Me" (Vintage Culture Extended Remix) – 5:28
- Digital download / streaming – Live featuring Silvana Estrada
1. "Cure for Me" (Live featuring Silvana Estrada) – 3:51

== Credits and personnel ==
Credits adapted from the liner notes of The Gods We Can Touch.

- Aurora Aksnes – vocals, songwriting, organ, synthesizer, production
- Magnus Åserud Skylstad – songwriting, bass, drums, synthesizer, production, programming, engineering
- Alexander von Mehren – drum machine
- Josh Gudwin – mixing
- Alex Wharton – mastering

== Charts ==
=== Weekly charts ===
Weekly chart performance for "Cure for Me"
Chart (2021–2023)	Peak position
CIS (TopHit)	17
Mexico Airplay (Billboard)	45
Mexico Ingles Airplay (Billboard)	19
Russia Airplay (TopHit)	12
UK Singles Sales (OCC)	71
UK Physical Singles (OCC)	6
Ukraine Airplay (TopHit)	145

=== Monthly charts ===
Monthly chart performance for "Cure for Me"
Chart (2023)	Position
CIS (TopHit)	19
Russia Airplay (TopHit)	13

=== Year-end charts ===
Year-end chart performance for "Cure for Me"
Chart (2023)	Position
CIS (TopHit)	95
Russia Airplay (TopHit)	69

== Certifications ==
Certifications for "Cure for Me"
Region	Certification	Certified units/sales
Brazil (Pro-Música Brasil)	Platinum	40,000^{‡}
^{‡} Sales+streaming figures based on certification alone.

== Release history ==
Release dates and formats for "Cure for Me"
Region	Date	Format(s)	Version	Label(s)	Ref.
Various	7 July 2021	Digital download; streaming	Original	Decca; Glassnote; Petroleum	
Various	9 July 2021	7-inch vinyl	Original	Decca	
Italy	16 July 2021	Radio airplay	Original	Universal	
France	18 July 2021	Radio airplay	Original	Universal	
Various	6 August 2021	Digital download; streaming	Acoustic	Decca; Glassnote; Petroleum	
Various	27 August 2021	Digital download; streaming	Vintage Culture remixes	Decca; Glassnote; Petroleum	
Various	31 October 2022	Digital download; streaming	EP	Glassnote; Petroleum	
Various	11 November 2022	Digital download; streaming	EP	Decca	
Various	21 June 2023	Digital download; streaming	Live featuring Silvana Estrada	Glassnote; Petroleum	
Various	23 June 2023	Digital download; streaming	Live featuring Silvana Estrada	Decca	
