= Giving In to the Love =

2021 single by Aurora

Single by Aurora

from the album The Gods We Can Touch
- Released: 14 October 2021
- Genre: Alt-pop
- Length: 3:01
- Label: Decca; Glassnote
- Songwriters: Aurora Aksnes; Magnus Skylstad
- Producers: Aurora Aksnes; Magnus Skylstad

Aurora singles chronology
"Cure for Me" (2021)	"Giving In to the Love" (2021)	"Paramour" (2021)

Music video
- "Giving In to the Love" on YouTube

"Giving In to the Love" is a song by Norwegian singer-songwriter Aurora for her fourth studio album, The Gods We Can Touch (2022). It was released on 14 October 2021, through Decca and Glassnote Records, as the third single from the album. The song incorporates tribal-inspired beats, keyboards, and electric guitars to craft an uplifting alt-pop track.

== Background ==
According to NME, Aurora described her single "Giving In to the Love" as "more playful and fun" while still addressing societal and historical issues that concern her. She stated that the song does not focus on "doom, gloom, COVID-19, and horror" but instead explores themes of darkness, light, and their absurd coexistence. Additionally, she noted that the track has a sensual quality and reflects her desire to bring a more enjoyable aspect to her music, as she has often written about serious topics in the past.

On October 11, Aurora took to Instagram to reveal the cover art for "Giving In to the Love" and announced that the single would be released on October 14. In her post, she wrote, "Hello you beautiful soul-filled bags of human flesh. Come with me into the garden of Eden… Giving into its beauty, and giving into the love."

== Charts ==
Chart performance for "Giving In to the Love"
Chart (2022)	Peak position
Mexico Ingles Airplay (Billboard)	22
