= Heathens (Aurora song) =

2021 single by Aurora

Single by Aurora

from the album The Gods We Can Touch
- Released: 2 December 2021
- Length: 3:45
- Label: Decca; Glassnote
- Songwriters: Aurora Aksnes; Magnus Skylstad; Odd Martin Skålnes
- Producers: Aurora Aksnes; Magnus Skylstad

Aurora singles chronology
"Midas Touch" (2021)	"Heathens" (2021)	"A Dangerous Thing" (2022)

Lyric video
- "Heathens" on YouTube

"Heathens" is a song by Norwegian singer-songwriter Aurora for her fourth studio album, The Gods We Can Touch (2022). It was released on 2 December 2021, through Decca and Glassnote, as the fourth single from the album. "Heathens" is a tribute to Eve and women who have shaped human freedom, celebrating free will and life's complexities.

Inspired by Persephone, the song was praised for its storytelling and powerful chorus. Released as a single, it was accompanied by A Touch of the Divine, a virtual concert broadcast globally via Moment House. Aurora described the event as a rare chance to present her music in its purest form.

== Background ==
Aurora described the track as a homage to Eve and women who have contributed to human freedom throughout history. She expressed admiration for the act of embracing free will and experiencing life in all its complexities, stating, "I think life should be lived in all of its colours, and that is why we live like heathens." The song was released as a single and accompanied by a virtual concert experience titled A Touch of the Divine, which was broadcast globally via Moment House on January 25. Speaking about the event, Aurora told NME that it was a rare opportunity to present the essence of her music in its purest form.

== Critical reception ==
According to Tom Taylor of Gigwise, "Heathens" is inspired by Persephone, the queen of the Underworld. He praised the song's soulful storytelling and powerful chorus, predicting that it would become a radio staple, much like Aurora's previous songs "Running with the Wolves" and "Murder Song (5, 4, 3, 2, 1)".
