= Aurora's 2024 Norwegian tour =

2024 concert tour by Aurora

2024 Norwegian Tour
- Tour by Aurora
- Location: Bergen; Hamar; Oslo; Stavanger; Trondheim
- Associated albums: The Gods We Can Touch; What Happened to the Heart?
- Start date: 3 March 2024
- End date: 23 March 2024
- No. of shows: 3 in Oslo; 3 in Bergen; 2 in Trondheim; 1 in Stavanger; 1 in Hamar; 10 in total
- Supporting act: Amalie Holt Kleive

Aurora concert chronology
- The Gods We Can Touch Tour (2022–2023); 2024 Norwegian Tour; What Happened to the Earth? (2024–2025)

The 2024 Norwegian Tour was a brief ten-show promotional tour by Norwegian singer-songwriter Aurora, in support of her fourth and fifth studio albums, The Gods We Can Touch (2022) and What Happened to the Heart? (2024), the latter not having yet been released at the time. It began on March 3 in Hamar and ended on March 23 in Oslo. It was followed by her 80-show What Happened to the Earth? also in 2024.

The tour was announced on 8 November 2023, the same day as the release of the lead single Your Blood, with dates being released in the same day.

== Set list ==
This set list is representative of the show on 7 March, in Bergen. It is not representative of all concerts for the duration of the tour.

1. "The River"
2. "Some Type of Skin"
3. "Infections of a Different Kind"
4. "Heathens"
5. "Blood in the Wine"
6. "Your Blood"
7. "The Conflict of the Mind"
8. "Exist for Love" (Acoustic)
9. "It Happened Quiet" (Acoustic)
10. "Exhale Inhale"
11. "Runaway"
12. "All is Soft Inside"
13. "The Seed"
14. "Running with the Wolves"
15. "Giving In to the Love"

Encore

16. "Cure for Me"
17. "Daydreamer"

== Tour dates ==
List of concerts, showing date, city, country, venue and opening act
Date (2024)	City	Country	Venue	Opening Act
3 March (Note: This concert is a part of the venue's 10-year anniversary celebration program in 2024 ("Hamar Kulturhus 10 år"). AURORA performed as the headliner of the program.)	Hamar	Norway	Hamar Kulturhus	—N/a
7 March	Bergen	Norway	Røkeriet USF	Amalie Holt Kleive
8 March	Bergen	Norway	Røkeriet USF	Amalie Holt Kleive
9 March	Bergen	Norway	Røkeriet USF	Amalie Holt Kleive
13 March	Trondheim	Norway	Byscenen	Amalie Holt Kleive
14 March	Trondheim	Norway	Byscenen	Amalie Holt Kleive
16 March	Stavanger	Norway	Stavanger Konserthus	Amalie Holt Kleive
21 March	Oslo	Norway	Sentrum Scene	Amalie Holt Kleive
22 March	Oslo	Norway	Sentrum Scene	Amalie Holt Kleive
23 March	Oslo	Norway	Sentrum Scene	Amalie Holt Kleive
