= List of awards and nominations received by Aurora =

Aurora awards and nominations
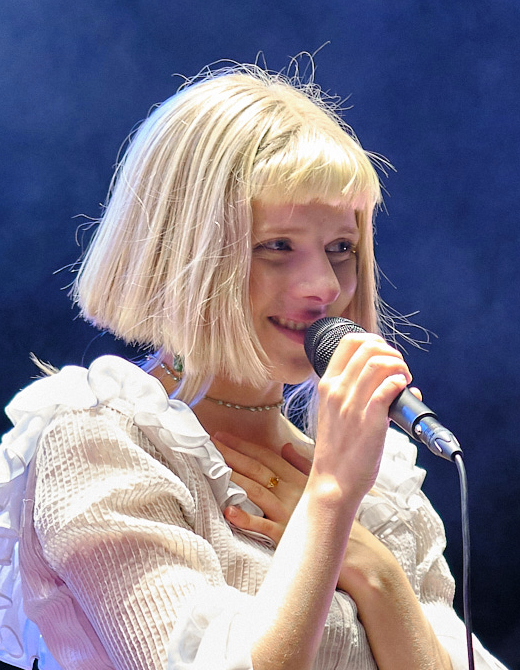
- Aurora performing in Cluj-Napoca, Romania (2021)
Awards and nominations
Award	Wins	Nominations
by:Larm	1	1
EBBA Awards	1	2
Edvard Prize	1	2
GAFFA Awards (Norway)	3	3
Guild of Music Supervisors Awards	0	1
MTV Europe Music Awards	0	1
P3 Gull	2	4
Silver Clef Awards	1	1
Spellemann Awards	4	13
UK Music Video Awards	0	2

Totals (Note: Certain award groups do not simply award one winner. They acknowledge several different recipients, have runners-up, and have third place. Since this is a specific recognition and is different from losing an award, runner-up mentions are considered wins in this award tally. For simplification and to avoid errors, each award in this list has been presumed to have had a prior nomination.)
- Wins: 15
- Nominations: 33

Aurora (born 1996) is a Norwegian singer, songwriter and record producer. After her breakthrough, she won the Spellemann Awards for Newcomer of the Year at the 2016 ceremony. The following year, her debut studio album All My Demons Greeting Me as a Friend earned the GAFFA Award for Norwegian Album of the Year and the Spellemann Award for Pop Soloist. Aurora also received the P3 Prize, awarded at the P3 Gull, which recognizes artists who have made a significant impact on Norwegian music.

In 2025, Aurora received nominations for Release of the Year and Alternative Pop at the Spellemann Awards for her fifth studio album, What Happened to the Heart?. She was also included in the Forbes 30 Under 30 list and is scheduled to receive the Contemporary Music Award at the 2025 Silver Clef Awards. As of July 2021, Aurora had sold over one million albums worldwide.

== Awards and nominations ==
Award	Year (Note: Indicates the year of ceremony. Each year is linked to the article about the awards held that year, wherever possible.)	Recipient(s) and nominee(s)	Category	Result	Ref.
by:Larm	2014	Aurora	Role Model Award (Note: No nominees were announced for this award.)	Won	
European Border Breakers Award	2016	Aurora	Public Choice Award	Nominated	
European Border Breakers Award	2016	Running with the Wolves	Norway	Won	
Edvard Prize	2023	"The Devil is Human"	Lyrics	Nominated	
Edvard Prize	2025	What Happened to the Heart?	Popular	Won	
GAFFA Awards (Norway)	2016	Aurora	Norwegian Solo Artist of the Year	Won	
GAFFA Awards (Norway)	2017	All My Demons Greeting Me as a Friend	Norwegian Album of the Year	Won	
GAFFA Awards (Norway)	2019	Aurora	Norwegian Solo Artist of the Year	Won	
Guild of Music Supervisors Awards	2018	"Life on Mars"	Best Song/Recording Created for Television	Nominated	
In Place of War Fellowship Awards	2025	Aurora	Fellowship Award	Won	
MTV Europe Music Awards	2016	Aurora	Best Norwegian Act	Nominated	
Music+Sound Awards	2023	"Hunting Shadows"	Best Original Composition in a Video Game Trailer/Promo	Nominated	
Musikkforleggerprisen	2019	"Forgotten Love"	Work of the Year – Popular Music (with Martin Sjølie)	Nominated	
Musikkforleggerprisen	2022	"Sofia" (with Askjell and Iris Caltwait)	Work of the Year – Popular Music	Nominated	
Musikkforleggerprisen	2025	Aurora	Author of the Year – Popular Music	Nominated	
NOPA Awards	2014	"Runaway"	NOPA Scholarship	Won	
P3 Gull	2014	Aurora	Newcomer of the Year	Nominated	
P3 Gull	2021	Aurora	Artist of the Year	Nominated	
P3 Gull	2022	Aurora	P3 Prize	Honoree	
P3 Gull	2026	Come Closer (as a member of Tomora)	Album of the Year	Won	
Silver Clef Awards	2025	Aurora	Contemporary Music Award	Honoree	
Spellemann Awards	2016	Aurora	Newcomer of the Year & Gramo Scholarship	Won	
Spellemann Awards	2016	"Running with the Wolves"	Song of the Year	Nominated	
Spellemann Awards	2017	All My Demons Greeting Me as a Friend	Album of the Year (Note: This category is presented as Release of the Year since the 2021 Spellemannprisen.)	Nominated	
Spellemann Awards	2017	All My Demons Greeting Me as a Friend	Pop Soloist	Won	
Spellemann Awards	2017	"I Went Too Far"	Music Video of the Year	Won	
Spellemann Awards	2019	"Queendom"	Music Video of the Year	Nominated	
Spellemann Awards	2020	Aurora	International Success of the Year	Nominated	
Spellemann Awards	2022	Aurora	International Success of the Year	Won	
Spellemann Awards	2023	The Gods We Can Touch	Producer of the Year (with Magnus Skylstad)	Nominated	
Spellemann Awards	2023	The Gods We Can Touch	Pop	Nominated	
Spellemann Awards	2023	"A Temporary High"	Music Video of the Year	Nominated	
Spellemann Awards	2025	What Happened to the Heart?	Release of the Year (Note: This category was presented as Album of the Year until the 2019 Spellemannprisen.)	Nominated	
Spellemann Awards	2025	What Happened to the Heart?	Alternative Pop	Nominated	
Tise Awards	2024	Aurora	Cultural Profile of the Year	Nominated	
UK Music Video Awards	2022	A Touch of the Divine	Best Live Video	Nominated	
UK Music Video Awards	2025	"A Rock Somewhere" x "The Seed" (for Greenpeace) (with Jacob Collier)	Best Live Video	Nominated	
