= The Flood (Aurora song) =

2025 single by Aurora

Single by Aurora

from the album What Happened to the Heart? (Deluxe)
- Released: 4 April 2025
- Length: 4:29
- Label: Decca; Glassnote
- Songwriters: Aurora Aksnes; Chris Greatti
- Producers: Chris Greatti; Aurora

Aurora singles chronology
"Through the Eyes of a Child" (2025)	"The Flood" (2025)	"We Can't Run from Yourself" (2025)

Visualiser
- "The Flood" on YouTube

"The Flood" is a song by Norwegian singer-songwriter Aurora from the deluxe edition of her fifth studio album, What Happened to the Heart? (2024). It was released on 4 April 2025, through Decca and Glassnote Records.

"The Flood" is Aurora's first new release since her 2024 album What Happened to the Heart?. Described by the artist as a song about "the invisible enemy," it lyrically explores the experience of emotional overwhelm, both internal and external, with lines such as "I've been under pressure all my life and I feel like I'm losing all my fights."

== Background ==
On 4 April 2025, Aurora released the song as the fifth single and the deluxe edition single from her album. Alongside the release, Aurora announced six additional arena shows as part of the UK and Europe leg of her world tour, including her largest sold-out show to date at London’s OVO Arena Wembley on May 3.

Around the same time, Aurora gained renewed attention when her 2016 track "Through the Eyes of a Child", originally released on her debut album, All My Demons Greeting Me as a Friend, was prominently featured in the final episode of the Netflix series Adolescence.

== Composition ==
Aurora explained that the song explores the concept of an "invisible enemy"—the internal sources of anger, anxiety, and sadness that lead one to withdraw rather than confront the world. According to Aurora, it reflects the human tendency to seek something or someone to blame, despite knowing that the resolution ultimately lies within oneself. The lyrics reflect a state of internal and external overwhelm, as heard in lines such as "I’ve been under pressure all my life and I feel like I’m losing all my fights."
