= Tomora (duo) =

Electronic music supergroup

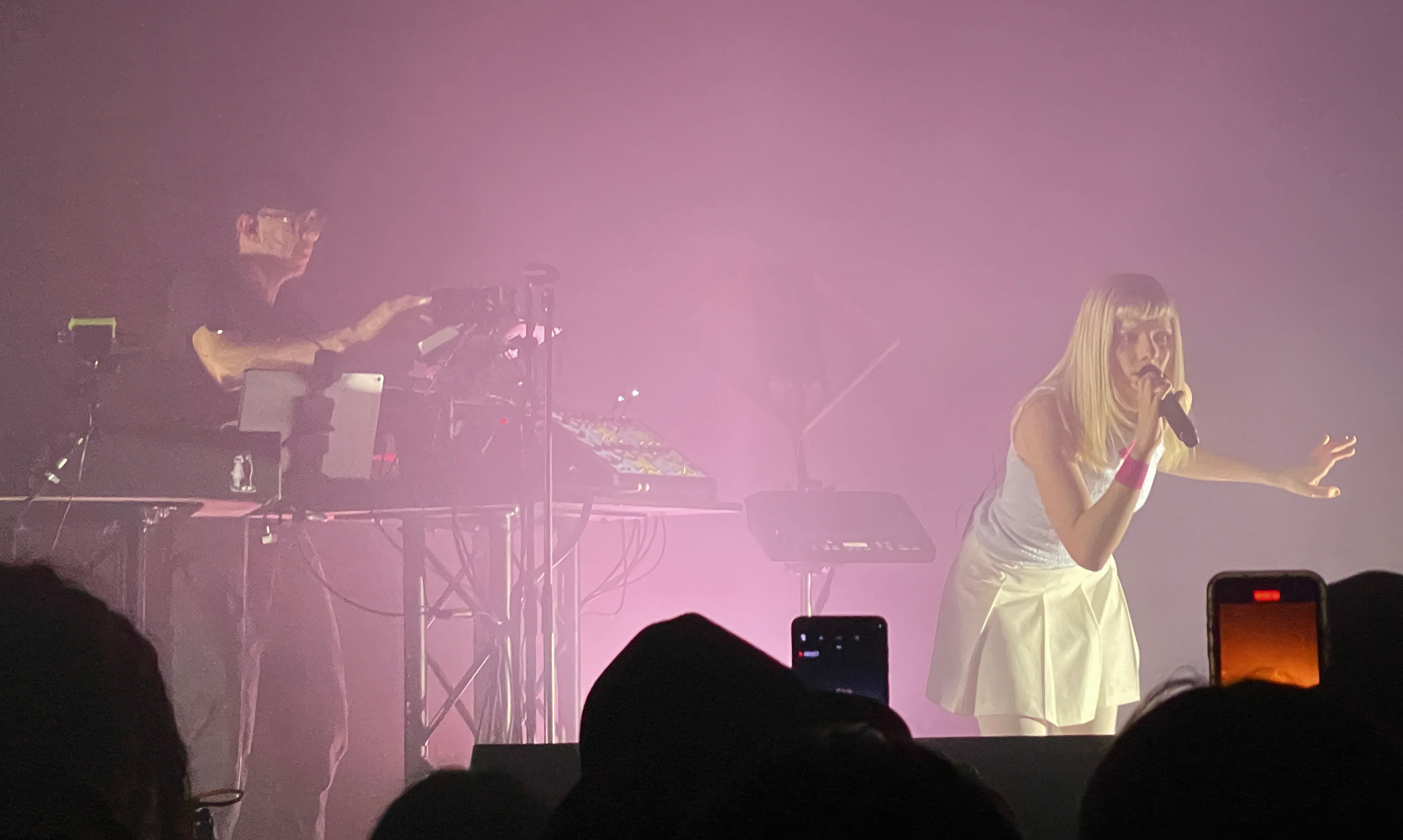
- Aurora and Rowlands performing as Tomora in 2026

Background information
- Origin: Europe
- Genres: Electronic; trip hop; techno
- Years active: 2025–present
- Labels: Fontana; Capitol
- Members: Tom Rowlands; Aurora; Amalie Holt Kleive; (touring singer/musician)
- Website: tomora.com

Tomora (stylized in all caps) is an electronic music supergroup duo formed in 2025 by Tom Rowlands of the electronic group the Chemical Brothers and singer-songwriter Aurora. The group's name is a portmanteau of the artists' first names.

== History ==
=== 2016-2024: Early beginnings and formation ===
Rowlands first saw Aurora perform in 2016 at Glastonbury, where he was so impressed the two began to collaborate on each other's work, with Rowlands contributing production to Aurora's fifth studio album What Happened to the Heart?, while Aurora had featured as a guest vocalist on No Geography. Tomora was created out of studio sessions between Rolands and Aurora. Early Tomora material remained hidden in the Chemical Brothers DJ sets prior to the band's announcement in mid-2025, including "Ring the Alarm" and "Somewhere Else". Beginning in late 2025, the name "Tomora" appeared on festival lineups including Øyafestivalen, NOS Alive, Colours of Ostrava and Coachella, leading to fan and press speculation regarding their identities.

=== 2025-present: Debut, Come Closer and Celebration ===
On 4 December 2025, the group was officially announced along with their first single "Ring the Alarm", with its B-side "The Thing" after two weeks of online advertising. These singles would aid to their debut album Come Closer.

Following the announcement of the album, the group released several other singles including "Come Closer", "Somewhere Else" and "I Drink the Light". Their debut album, Come Closer, was released on 17 April 2026. Physical formats of the album were released on LP and CD. All of their singles video-shoots were completed by Adam Smith. The album received generally favourable reviews.

On 16 April, the duo announced their first tour across North America, Europe, and Asia.

On 23 September, the duo announced their first EP Celebration to be released on 17 October 2026 along with its title track. On the same day the duo announced their first show in New York City. Celebration released with positive reviews, highlighting their in-studio version of "In a Minute".

== Discography ==
=== Studio albums ===
Title	Description	Peak chart positions						
Title	Description	BEL (FL)	FRA	GER	NOR	SCO	UK	UK Dance
Come Closer	Released: 17 April 2026; Label: Fontana, Capitol; Formats: CD, LP, cassette, digital download	53	106	45	19	4	16	1

=== EPs ===
List of eps
Title	EP details
Celebration	Released: 16 October 2026; Label: Fontana; Formats: Digital download, streaming

=== Compilation albums ===
List of compilation albums
Title	Album details
Live from the Aura Motor (DJ Mix)	Released: 6 March 2026; Label: Fontana; Formats: Digital download, streaming

=== Singles ===
Title	Year	Album
"Ring the Alarm"	2025	Come Closer
"The Thing"	2026	Come Closer
"Come Closer"	2026	Come Closer
"Somewhere Else"	2026	Come Closer
"I Drink the Light"	2026	Come Closer
"In a Minute"	2026	Come Closer
"Celebration"	2026	Celebration
"Hold On Let Go"	2026	Celebration
