= Aurora (singer) =

Norwegian singer-songwriter (born 1996)

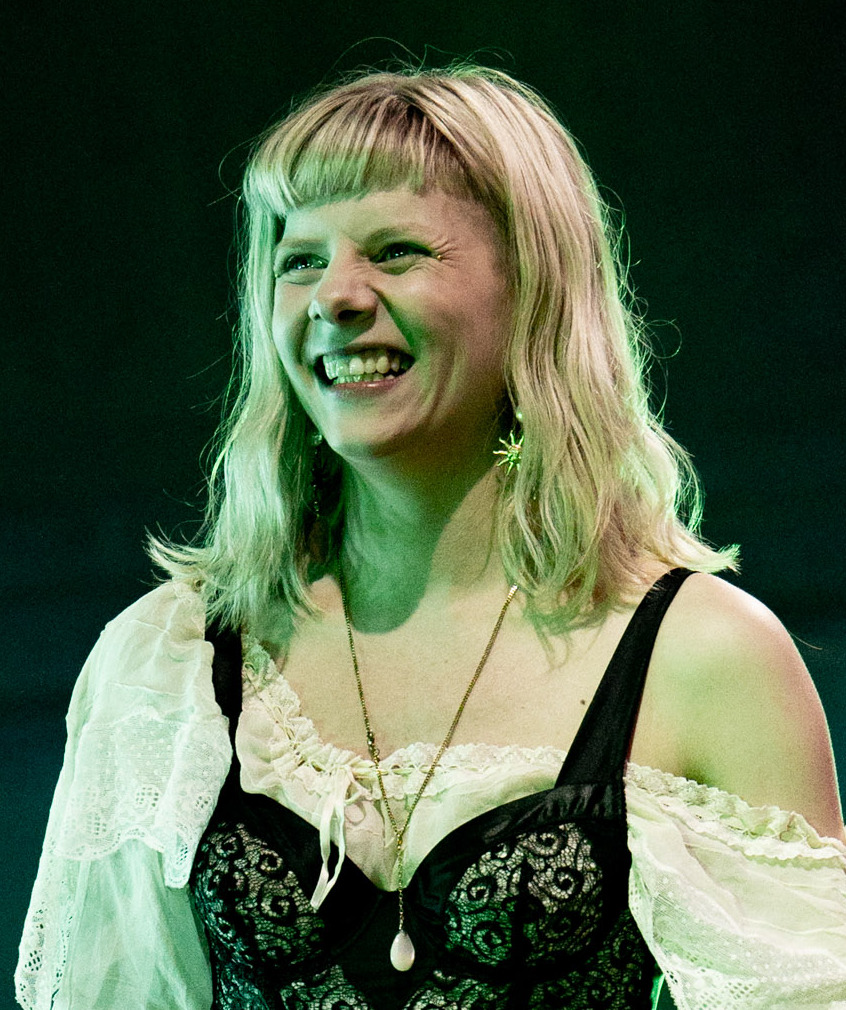
- Aurora in 2024
- Born: Aurora Aksnes; 15 June 1996 (age 30); Stavanger, Norway
- Occupations: Singer; songwriter; record producer
- Years active: 2012–present
- Works: Discography
- Awards: Full list
- Musical career
- Origin: Bergen
- Genres: Art pop; synth-pop; electropop; alternative pop; folk-pop
- Instruments: Vocals; piano; keyboards; harp; percussion
- Labels: Decca; Glassnote; Petroleum; Fontana
- Member of: Tomora
- Website: aurora-music.com

Aurora Aksnes (Note: Norwegian pronunciation: [æʉ̯ˈɾùːɾɑ ˈɑ̂ksˌneːs] OW-ROO-RAH AHKS-NUHS) (born 15 June 1996), known mononymously as AURORA (stylised in all capital letters), is a Norwegian singer, songwriter and record producer. Known for blending electropop, folk, and art pop, she has been described as a pioneer of the Norwegian art pop scene and dubbed the "Fairy of Pop". (Note: Aurora has been referred to as "Fairy of Pop" or "Fadinha do Pop" (in Portuguese) by various publications, including Telegraph India, Veja, G1, Soap Central, and Portal Lineup.) She started writing songs and learning dance at age six, and gained recognition as a teenager after a classmate posted her music online without her knowledge. Initially trained on the piano, she later learned percussion and production.

Aurora signed with Petroleum, Decca, and Glassnote Records in 2014, and released her debut extended play (EP), Running with the Wolves, in 2015. Its lead single, "Runaway", gained massive popularity years later after going viral on TikTok. Her debut studio album, All My Demons Greeting Me as a Friend, was released to positive reviews in 2016, topping the Norwegian VG-lista and earning international success. Aurora followed her debut with a two-part concept album: Infections of a Different Kind (Step 1) (2018) and A Different Kind of Human (Step 2) (2019).

Her fourth studio album, The Gods We Can Touch (2022), marked her first top-10 entry in the UK. In 2024, she released her fifth album, What Happened to the Heart?, which charted highly across Europe. In 2025, Aurora shifted towards a more electronic-focused sound when she formed the musical project Tomora with Tom Rowlands of The Chemical Brothers, releasing the album Come Closer the following year. Beyond her solo work, Aurora has collaborated with a range of artists, including Jacob Collier, Wu Qing-feng, Sondre Lerche, Tom Odell, Askjell, Bring Me the Horizon, and Hans Zimmer.

Her contributions extend to soundtracks for numerous films, television series, and video game franchises, such as Frozen 2, Wolfwalkers, the live-action One Piece series, Kaiju No. 8, FIFA, Sky: Children of the Light, Assassin's Creed, and Genshin Impact. With 10 billion streams, Aurora is the most-streamed female Norwegian artist of all time, and she has toured in more than 50 countries across Europe, the Americas, Asia and Oceania. Her accolades include four Spellemann Awards, an EBBA Award, and the P3 Prize at the P3 Gull. At age 21, she became the youngest person to earn a stone on the Bergen Walk of Fame, later receiving a spot on the Forbes 30 Under 30 list.

== Early life ==
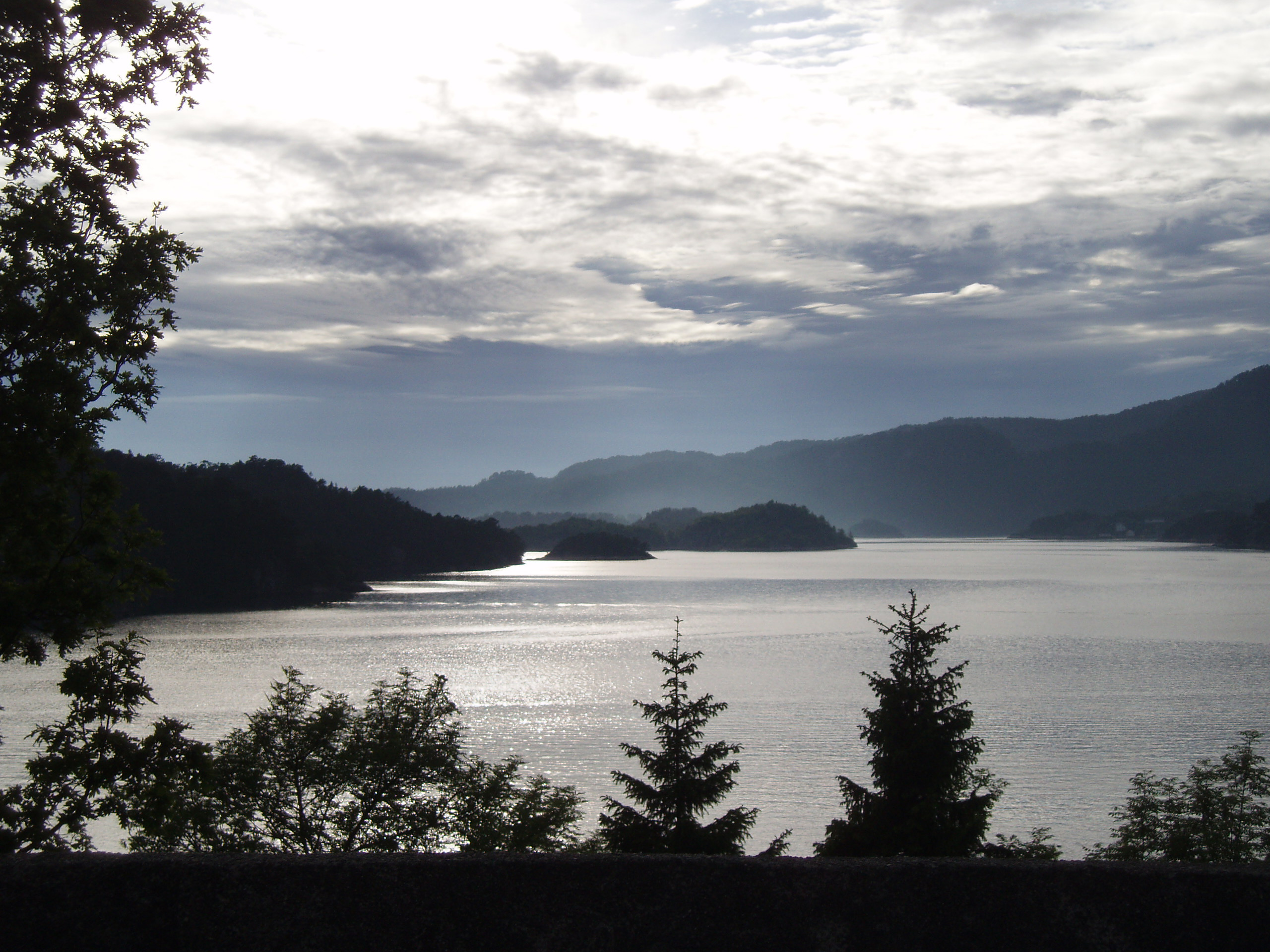
View of Lysefjorden in Os Municipality, where Aurora was raised

Aurora Aksnes was born on 15 June 1996 at Stavanger University Hospital in Stavanger, Norway, the youngest of three daughters to midwife May Britt Froastad and garage door salesman Jan Øystein Aksnes. Her eldest sister, Miranda, is a makeup artist and former teacher, while her other sister, Viktoria, is a fashion designer, stylist, and blogger. Aurora spent her early years in Høle, a small town where her parents had lived for 15 years, fostering her love for nature and traditional clothing, such as hats and long skirts, before the family relocated to Drange, a remote village in the woodlands of the Os mountains in Hordaland, near Bergen and Lysefjord. She described her childhood home in Drange as a quiet, car-free area with abundant trees and poor internet connectivity.

Growing up surrounded by nature, Aurora identified as a "forest person", enjoying activities like climbing trees, and valuing the isolation and safety of her environment. At school, her sisters worried she might face bullying due to her eccentric personality and distinctive style of dress, but she preferred solitary moments in forests, which she credited with helping her philosophise and discover her own mind. As a child, she was uncomfortable with physical affection and had an unusual hobby of collecting dead insects, such as moths, which became a symbol for her debut album. At age 11, she attended a funeral on Christmas Eve, an event that contributed to her developing dysphemia, prompting her to learn sign language. The loss of a friend from her sign language class in a car accident and two close friends—one to suicide and another in the 2011 Utøya massacre—deeply affected her, inspiring the song "Little Boy in the Grass", released in 2015.

One of her earliest musical memories is finding an electric piano in her parents' attic, previously owned by her sister Miranda. At age six, she began learning piano, initially imitating classical music before composing her own melodies by age nine, influenced by artists like Leonard Cohen, Bob Dylan, Enya, and the Chemical Brothers.

== Career ==
=== 2012–2013: Career beginnings ===
Initially, Aurora kept her music private, as her parents did not encourage it as a career or hobby. She also explored other ambitions, including becoming a doctor, physicist, or dancer, and trained in dance from ages 6 to 16, performing in a contemporary dance group at the Norwegian Youth Festival of Art to songs like Paramore's "Decode" and Michael Jackson's "Ghosts". Her dislike of her own voice initially deterred her from considering a singing career.

Aurora's earliest known composition was "The Lonely Man", followed by "I Had a Dream", which addressed global challenges. Although she considered it a "really long and boring song about world peace", she performed it once at her high school's leaving ceremony. Before pursuing music, Aurora worked briefly washing the exterior of a pizza restaurant. Her breakthrough came unexpectedly when a classmate uploaded a recording of her song "Puppet"—originally a Christmas gift for her parents—and a video of her school performance of "I Had a Dream" to the internet without her permission, sparking her anger. The uploads quickly gained thousands of views in Norway, building her an early fan base on Facebook. In early 2013, a representative from Made Management, a Norwegian management company, discovered her work and invited her to their office. Though initially hesitant, Aurora was persuaded by her mother to consider sharing her music, recognising its potential to resonate with others.

=== 2014–2017: All My Demons Greeting Me as a Friend ===
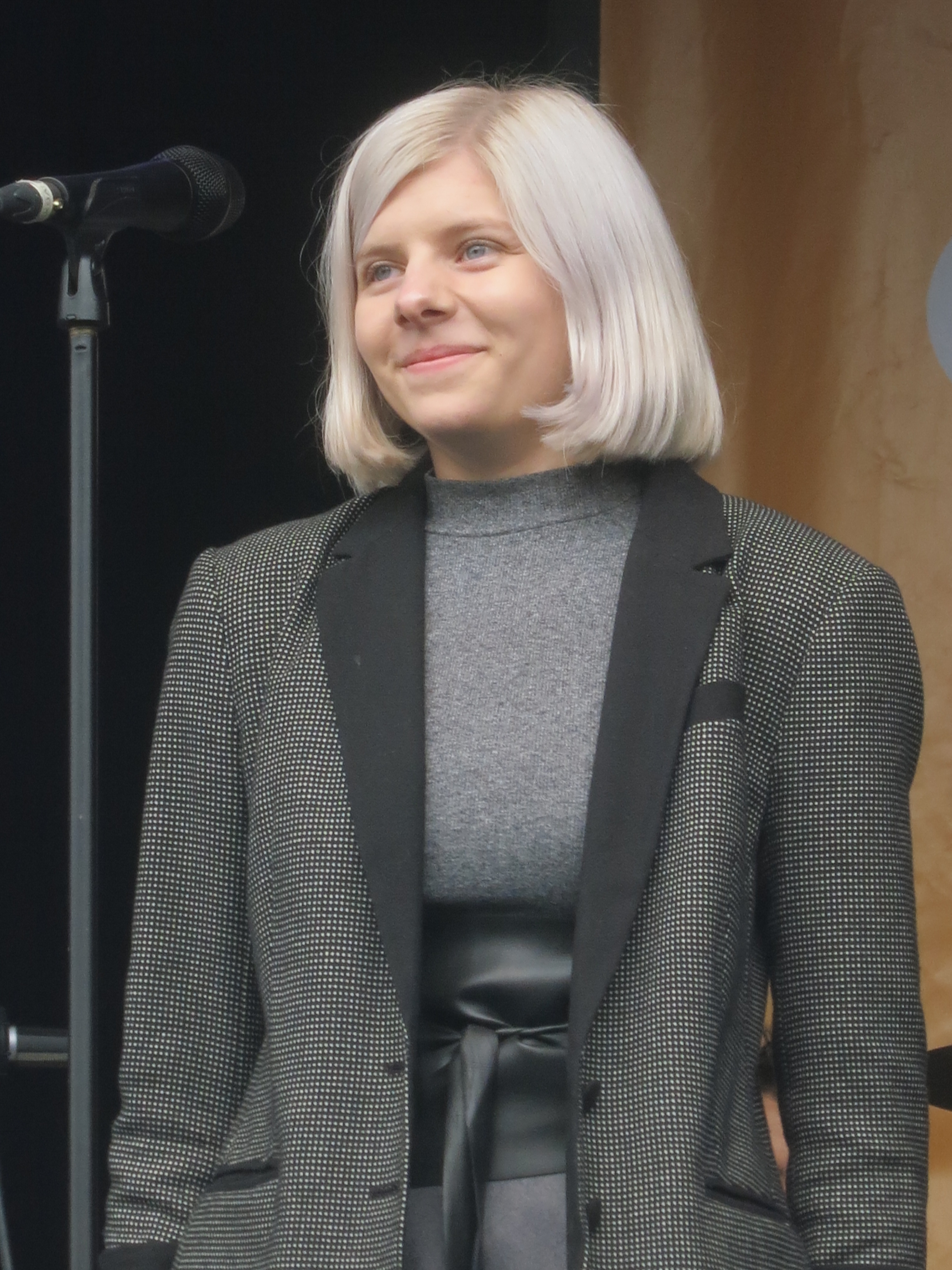
Aurora at the Green Man Festival in 2015

Following the success of her single "Puppet" in Norway, Aurora signed recording contracts with Petroleum, Decca, and Glassnote Records in 2014. That same year, she released the singles "Awakening" and "Under Stars", with the former earning her the title of Untouched of the Week on NRK Urørt. Her distinctive vocal style and musicality drew critical acclaim across Europe and the United States, establishing her as a promising new artist.

In May 2015, Aurora released her debut EP, Running with the Wolves, which received positive reviews from online music publications and Norwegian media. The EP's lead single, "Runaway", enjoyed a major resurgence in 2021 after going viral on TikTok, reaching number 22 on the Billboard Global 200 and number 25 on the UK Singles Chart. Later in 2015, her cover of Oasis' "Half the World Away" for the John Lewis Christmas advert peaked at number 11 on the UK Singles Chart. In December, she performed at the Nobel Peace Prize Concert, describing the experience as "an incredibly beautiful thing to be a part of." Host Jay Leno praised her performance.

Aurora performing at ICA, London, 2016

In early 2016, Aurora won the Spellemann Award for Newcomer of the Year, along with a 250,000-kroner Gramo scholarship, and the EBBA Award for international breakthrough with Running with the Wolves. That January, she was featured alongside Troye Sivan on Rolling Stone's "10 New Artists You Need to Know" list. Her debut studio album, All My Demons Greeting Me as a Friend, was released in March and topped Norway's VG-lista for two consecutive weeks, marking her as the first Norwegian debutant to achieve a number-one debut since Emilie Nicolas in 2014. The record wove themes of fantasy, heartache, life, and death, drawing comparisons to Björk, Florence Welch, and Enya. It earned a Spellemann nomination for Album of the Year and won in the categories of Pop Soloist and Music Video of the Year for "I Went Too Far". As of September 2018, the album had sold 500,000 copies worldwide and was supported by a year-long international concert tour that began in North America and ended in Brazil.

That same year, Aurora contributed a cover of David Bowie's "Life on Mars" to the HBO series Girls. She made her American television debut on The Tonight Show Starring Jimmy Fallon, performing "Conqueror"—a song previously featured in the FIFA 16 soundtrack and later included in the FIFA 23 World Cup update. She also appeared on The Howard Stern Show and The Late Show with Stephen Colbert, performing "Life on Mars" and "I Went Too Far". Additionally, she partnered with YouTube for a creative content initiative and starred in the short documentary Nothing is Eternal, directed by Isaac Ravishankara and produced by The Fader.

In November 2017, Aurora performed a Christmas concert at Nidaros Cathedral in Trondheim as part of the Olavsfestdagene. The event sold out its tickets in five minutes and was later broadcast on NRK1. The cathedral administration had initially objected, stating that the concert did not meet the venue's usage criteria, but an appeal to the parish council secured its approval.

=== 2017–2020: Two-part album and "Into the Unknown" ===
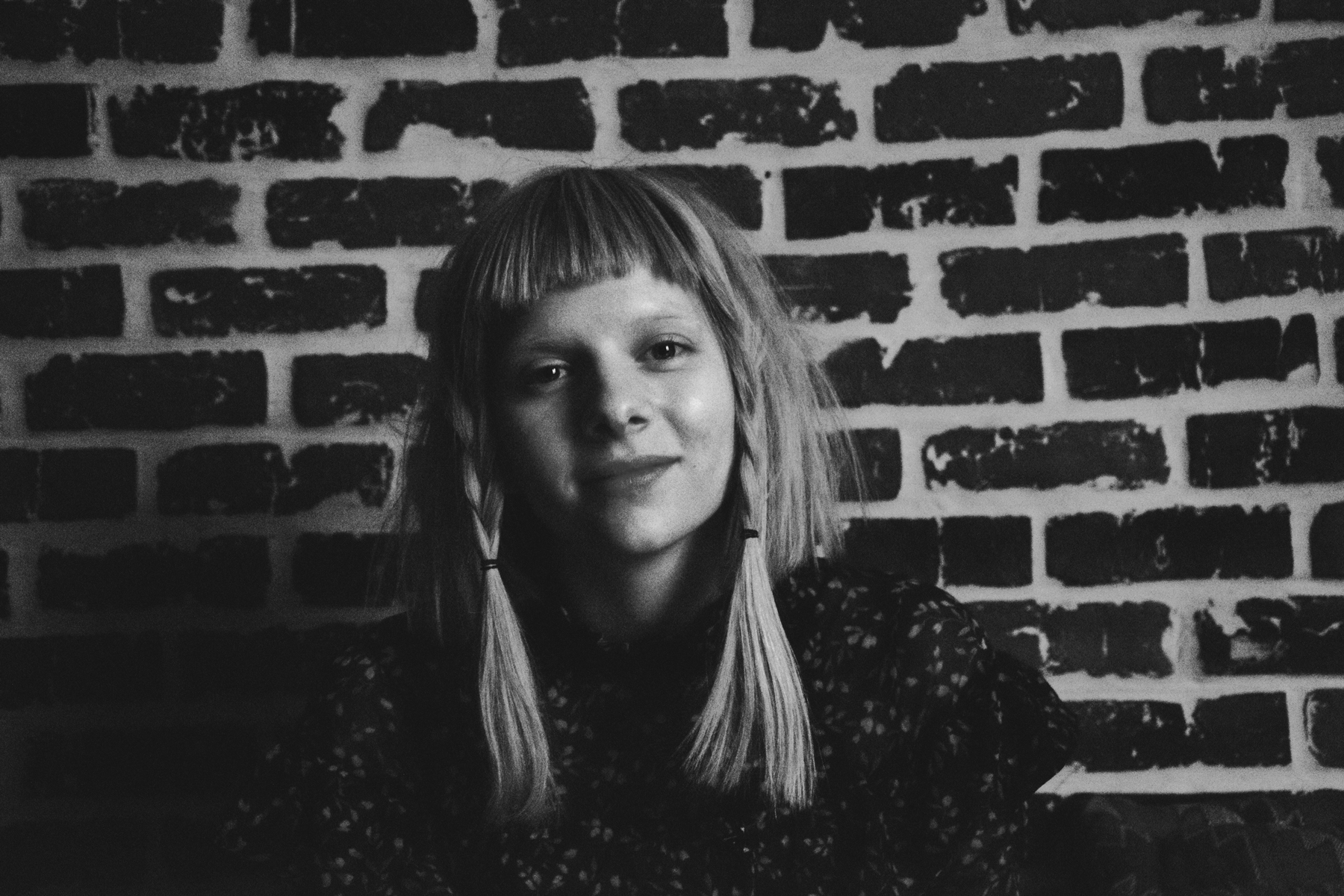
Aurora pictured at a club in Paris, France, in March 2018

Following the release of All My Demons Greeting Me as a Friend, Aurora announced in November 2016 that she had begun writing and producing her second studio album, describing her debut as the "first album of many." In 2017, she contributed a cover of "Scarborough Fair" for the Brazilian telenovela Deus Salve o Rei, also appearing in its opening sequence.

In April 2018, Aurora released "Queendom" as the lead single from her upcoming two-part album, followed by "Forgotten Love" in August. The album, recorded in France earlier that year with producers Askjell, Roy Kerr, and Tim Bran, saw Aurora deeply involved in the production process. The new material explored themes of politics, sexuality, and empowerment, inspired by interactions with fans during her debut tour, while maintaining some lyrical continuity with her first album. The music video for "Queendom", released in May 2018, emphasised inclusivity, particularly for her LGBTQ+ fanbase, featuring a scene where Aurora kissed a female dancer to symbolise acceptance of all forms of love. She previewed several new songs at festivals such as Lollapalooza and Coachella. The first part, Infections of a Different Kind (Step 1), an eight-track release, was released in September 2018, with Aurora describing its closing track as "the most important song I've ever written." The second part, A Different Kind of Human (Step 2), followed in June 2019. Aurora supported both releases with a headlining tour starting in Manchester in late 2018 and performances at festivals including Glastonbury, Groovin' the Moo, and Outside Lands.

In April 2019, Aurora co-wrote and provided vocals for three tracks—"Eve of Destruction", "Bango", and "The Universe Sent Me"—on No Geography, the ninth studio album by The Chemical Brothers. Later that year, she contributed backing vocals to "Into the Unknown" from Disney's Frozen 2 and performed it live at the 92nd Academy Awards in February 2020 with Idina Menzel and a chorus of international singers representing the song's translations. Her solo version of the song was released as a single in March 2020. Previously, in 2018, she performed a cover of "Baby Mine" as the final act at Disney's panel during CCXP for the soundtrack of Dumbo (2019).

=== 2020–2023: The Gods We Can Touch ===
Aurora performing at the Pryzm club in Kingston upon Thames (2022)

In November 2020, Aurora recorded the title track for the Norwegian Christmas miniseries Stjernestøv for NRK, under the musical direction of Gaute Tønder; she then contributed vocals to "Vinterens Gåte" and "Det Ev Ei Rosa Sprunge" for Herborg Kråkevik's album Juleroser. Backed by the Bergen Philharmonic Orchestra, the release preceded another film contribution. Later that December, Aurora re-recorded her 2015 single "Running with the Wolves" for the animated film Wolfwalkers.

The lead single from her fourth studio album The Gods We Can Touch, "Exist for Love", was released in May 2020; presented as her first love song, it was accompanied by a self-directed music video. Created during the COVID-19 lockdown with string arrangements by Isobel Waller-Bridge, the track marked the beginning of what Aurora described as "a new era" in her career. Over the following year, she released the singles "Cure for Me" in July 2021 and "Giving In to the Love" in October. That same month, introduced by Queen Sonja, Aurora and her guitarist Fredrik Svabø performed live at the Royal Palace in Oslo during a dinner honouring Norwegian participants of the 2020 Summer Olympics and Paralympics. Later that November, she released "Midas Touch" for the soundtrack of Amazon Studios' Hanna and featured on American singer Sub Urban's track "Paramour".

The Gods We Can Touch was released in January 2022 and received critical acclaim. It achieved significant commercial success in the Greater China region, reaching 350 million streams; it also reached number one in Norway for the first time since her debut album and secured her first top-10 entry in the UK, later selling over 20,000 copies in the country. Two other singles from the album were released to precede the record: "Heathens" in December 2021 and "A Dangerous Thing" in January 2022. Following the album's release, Aurora premiered a virtual concert film, A Touch of the Divine, streamed via Moment House.

To promote The Gods We Can Touch, Aurora embarked on an international concert tour, extending her presence across Europe, Latin America and Southeast Asia, with debut concerts in Lithuania, Romania, Taiwan, Thailand, Colombia, Indonesia, and Peru. She also performed a closing headline set at the Øya Festival in Norway, which received rave reviews and led Variety and NRK P3 to name her "one of Norway's biggest artists." For her domestic and international achievements in 2022, she won the Spellemann Award for International Success of the Year and received the P3 Prize at the P3 Gull, presented by Billie Eilish.

During this period, she continued to collaborate, featuring on Sondre Lerche's "Alone in the Night" in April and Wu Qing-feng's "Storm" in June. In August, she contributed vocals to Hans Zimmer's Frozen Planet II soundtrack, later performing "Take Me Back Home" at the Royal Albert Hall during the BBC's Earth Proms, before releasing "Hunting Shadows" in September for the 15th anniversary of the Assassin's Creed franchise. In October, she provided the opening and closing themes for the video game Sky: Children of the Light; an in-game virtual concert subsequently premiered after The Game Awards in December. The event returned in August 2023, achieving a Guinness World Record for "Most Users in a Concert-themed Virtual World" with 10,061 simultaneous players, and again in June 2025 as Aurora: Homecoming, celebrating her return to Norway post-tour.

=== 2023–2025: What Happened to the Heart? ===
In January 2023, Aurora began teasing her fifth studio album, sharing on an Instagram story that she was "working on so many babies." That same month, she collaborated with Tom Odell on the piano ballad "Butterflies". Between July and August, she contributed a cover of Nick Drake's "Pink Moon" to the tribute album The Endless Coloured Ways: The Songs of Nick Drake and released "My Sails Are Set" for the soundtrack of the live-action series One Piece.

In October 2023, Aurora teased new music by posting an audio clip and pre-save link on her official Twitter account, captioned "08.11." The following month, she released "Your Blood", her first solo single in nearly two years. This was followed in early 2024 by the singles "The Conflict of the Mind" and "Some Type of Skin". During this period, she also completed a headlining tour in Norway. In March 2024, she announced her fifth studio album, What Happened to the Heart?, which was released in June. The album fuses indie pop and disco while drawing inspiration from pop, techno, and folk music. It achieved top-10 positions in Norway, Scotland, the UK, Germany, and the Netherlands, was nominated for Release of the Year at the 2025 Spellemann Awards, and won the Edvard Prize for Popular Music for being "a cohesive and well-thought-out work, carried by a clear artistic vision."

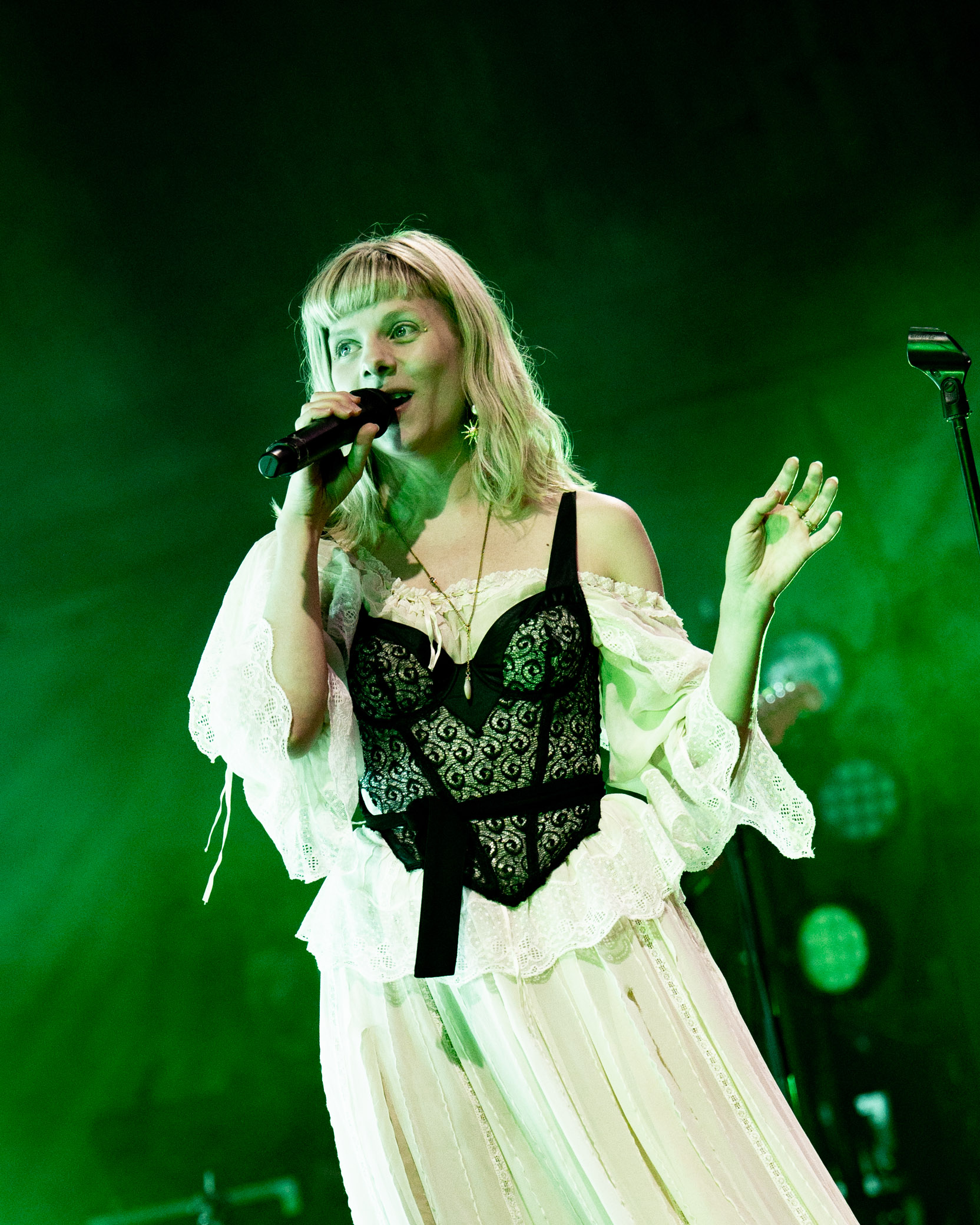
Aurora performing in Kristiansand, Norway, in July 2024

To promote the album, Aurora embarked on her fifth concert tour, titled What Happened to the Earth?. It was her first time headlining arena concerts and included debut performances in Greece, India, Mainland China, Hong Kong, Malaysia, and the Philippines, attracting over 300,000 attendees overall. The tour's video recording took place at the Palacio de los Deportes arena in Mexico City on the Day of the Dead, where Aurora played her biggest headline show to a sold-out crowd of 18,000 people; the resulting film was screened in theatres worldwide. Prior to her concert at Wembley Arena, she hosted a free retrospective exhibition, Some Type of Skin – An Exhibition, displaying her stage outfits and visual art while tracing the evolution of her aesthetic and career.

In 2025, Forbes included her in its 30 Under 30 list, and Nordoff and Robbins honoured her with the Silver Clef Award for Contemporary Music. Later that year, she released "You Can't Run from Yourself" as the opening theme for the second season of the anime Kaiju No. 8. At the centenary celebration of Gamlehaugen as a royal residence in Bergen that August, Aurora performed as the event's secret artist; she then met King Harald V and members of the Norwegian royal family.

In addition to her solo work, Aurora featured on Bring Me the Horizon's song "Limousine" from their album Post Human: Nex Gen (2024). She also collaborated with Jacob Collier on a mashup of her song "The Seed" and his "A Rock Somewhere", performed in the Arctic to raise awareness for ocean and climate protection. She further contributed to the Genshin Impact soundtrack, performing the main theme of the Nod-Krai region alongside the London Voices and the London Symphony Orchestra. She also collaborated with Leif Vollebekk on the song "Southern Star", in which she starred in the short film of the same name, directed by Kaveh Nabatian, who had previously worked with Aurora on the videos for her previous album.

=== 2025–present: Tomora and Come Closer ===
In December 2025, Aurora and Tom Rowlands from The Chemical Brothers, who previously served as a producer to What Happened to the Heart?, officially announced the formation of the electronic music duo Tomora, whose name is a portmanteau of their first names. Their style involves repetitive ethereal or eerie sounds accompanied by electronic beats.

The group performed at Coachella in April 2026 a few days before releasing their debut album Come Closer.

In September, Aurora released a full studio version of the song All My Demons Greeting Me As A Friend in celebration of the 10^{th} anniversary of her eponymous debut album, followed by a release of the album's reissue subtitled as The Moth Tapes.

== Artistry ==
=== Influences ===
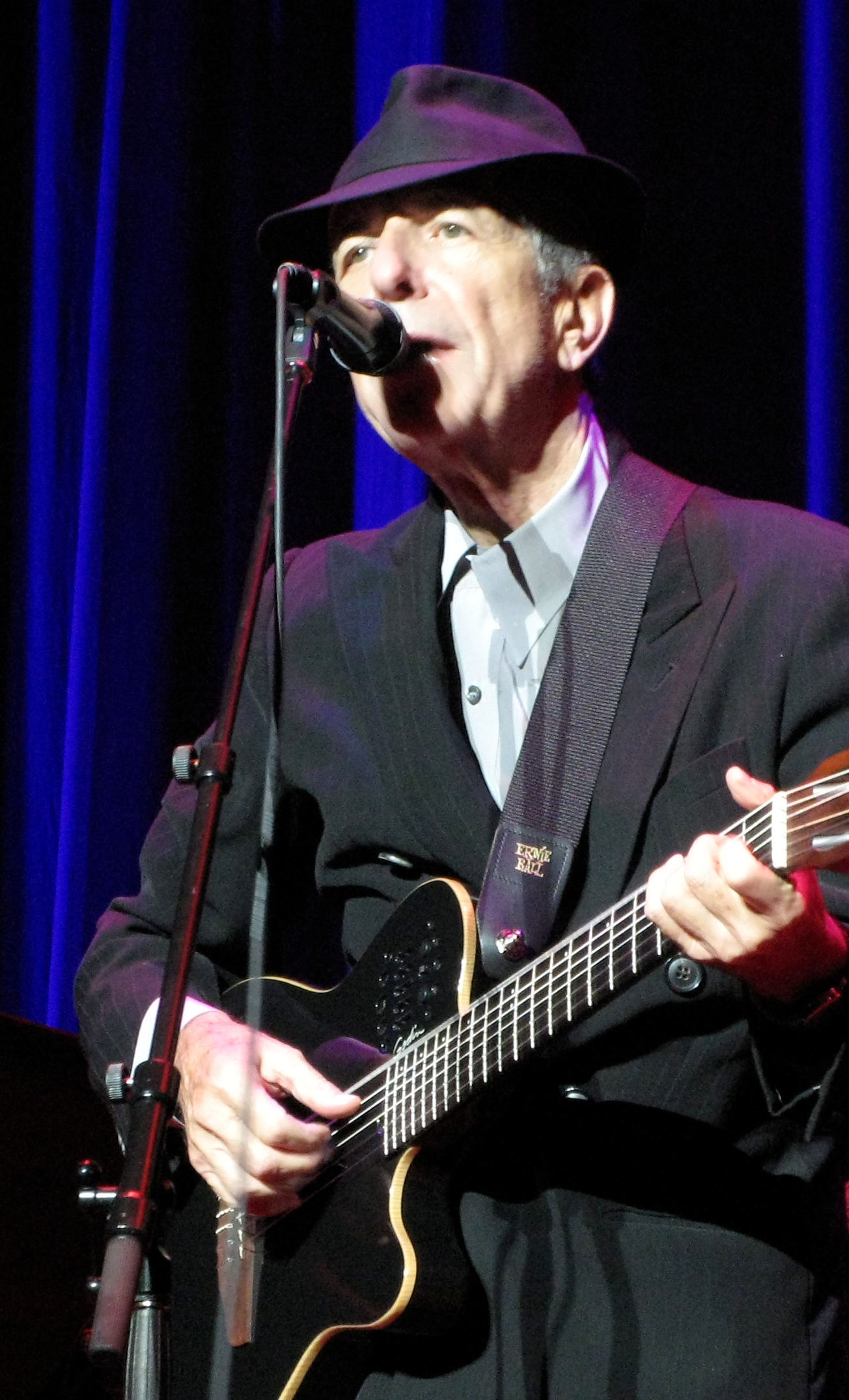
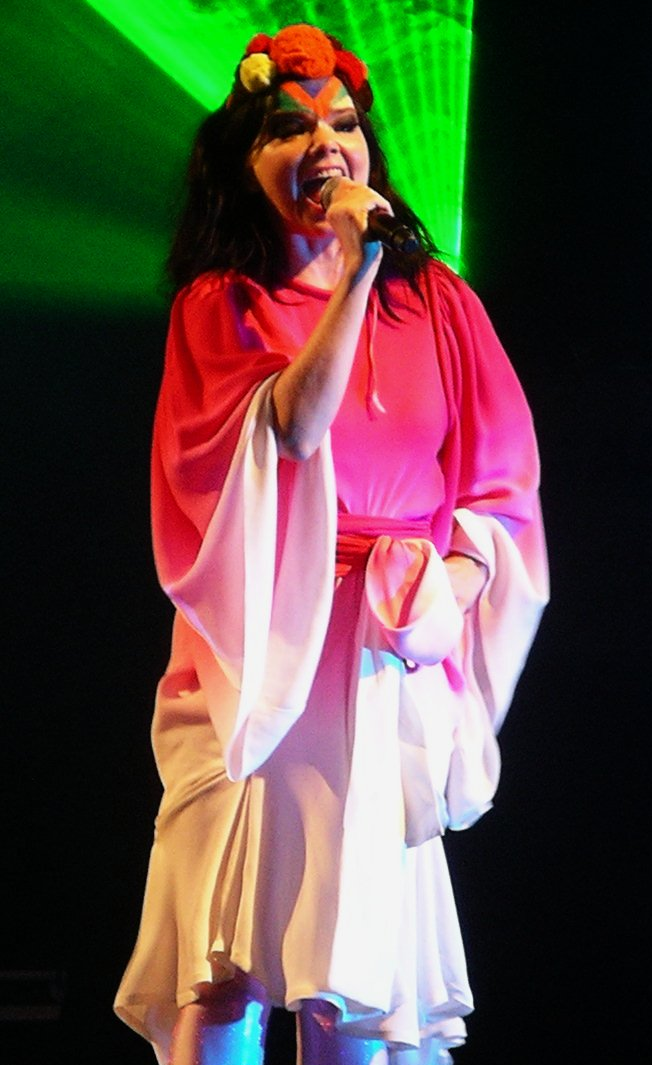
Aurora's cited influences, such as musician Leonard Cohen (left) and Björk (right)

At home, she did not have access to radio or music channels on television; she admitted that she had listened to very few artists at the beginning of her singing career. She has mentioned Ane Brun, Björk, Bob Dylan, Enya, Johnny Cash, Kate Bush, Leonard Cohen, Oasis, Susanne Sundfør, The Beatles, and Underworld as her major influences. She said that the first album she bought was Dylan's Blonde on Blonde. She also talked about heavy metal as a major inspiration for her from a young age, citing French band Gojira as her "favorite band", and she has attended two of their concerts. She first listened to one of their songs when she was around 11 years old and described it as "so hard and so intense and dark, and it felt like an explosion." Aurora has also listened to the bands Mastodon, System of a Down, Tool, Metallica, Refused, and Slayer. She also stated in a BBC Radio 2 interview that she had a great love for many Scandinavian heavy metal bands as well as David Bowie. Her love for heavy metal inspired her compilation EP For the Metal People, which included some of her songs influenced by the genre. Aurora also expressed her admiration for rock musician Iggy Pop, adding that when she met him during a festival in Belgium, she was "so happy I almost peed my pants." She and the frontman of Nordic folk band Wardruna have shown admiration for each other's work, and performed the song "Helvegen" together several times.

She has covered some of her influences' songs, some of them are "Mr. Tambourine Man", "Famous Blue Raincoat", "Life on Mars", "Across the Universe", and "Make You Feel My Love". About recent influences, Aurora stated that she dislikes listening to music, which she described as "noise" or "interference" for her, adding that she has "music in my mind all the time". She also said that she does not have streaming platforms like iTunes and Spotify but she has "some LPs at home and a few CDs." She added she only likes to listen to some of her influences' music during travelling.

=== Musical style and themes ===
I don't want to write sad songs only to make people sad, I'll end up with lots of depressed fans. That's not my goal at all. But I want people to know that it's not dangerous to cry or think of something sad for a while. It's easier to think about it through a song, which can also be beautiful while being sad. It's like taking medicine with a teaspoon of sugar. It's important to have some hope.

— Statement by Aurora on her profile at the Glassnote Records website.

Aurora's musical style encompasses a diverse range of genres, including art pop, Nordic folk, synth-pop, electropop, electro-folk, dark pop, avant-garde pop, alt-pop, folk-pop, and new-age. Critics have described her music in various terms: Haley Weiss of Interview characterizes her as a "poetic author of art-pop" and an "unaffectedly curious artist," while John Murphy of MusicOMH notes her songs blend "sizzling synth-pop" with Nordic folk influences. Michael Cragg of The Guardian identifies her sound as "dark electro-pop," and Cyclone Wehner from Music Feeds highlights her "darkly romantic electro-folk" and distinctive eccentricity, which have attracted a cult fanbase. Mathias Rosenzweig, writing for Paper, likens her to "Scandinavia's newest dark pop prodigy," drawing comparisons to Björk's fascination with natural landscapes and noting similarities to Sia and Lorde. Ed Potton of The Times compares her to Florence and the Machine, and Lisa Higgins of Clash describes her as an avant-garde pop artist, with Jessica Fynn from the same publication labeling her an "alt-pop aesthete." Chris Tinkham of Paste categorizes her music as "dark folk-pop."

Aurora possesses a soprano vocal range, with her voice frequently described as "ethereal" by critics. Her use of vocal motifs, such as "ah", "oh", and "la", is a recurring characteristic in her music. While she primarily composes in English, she has also performed songs in Norwegian, including "Stjernestøv", "Vinterens Gåte", and "Det Hev Ei Rosa Sprunge". Since her 2018 album Infections of a Different Kind (Step 1), Aurora has incorporated lyrics in an invented "emotional language" to enhance the emotional impact and meaning of her performances. She is proficient in playing the piano and has knowledge of other instruments, including the ukulele, guitar, and harp. Aurora occasionally contributes to the percussion and production aspects of her music.

== Public image and philanthropy ==
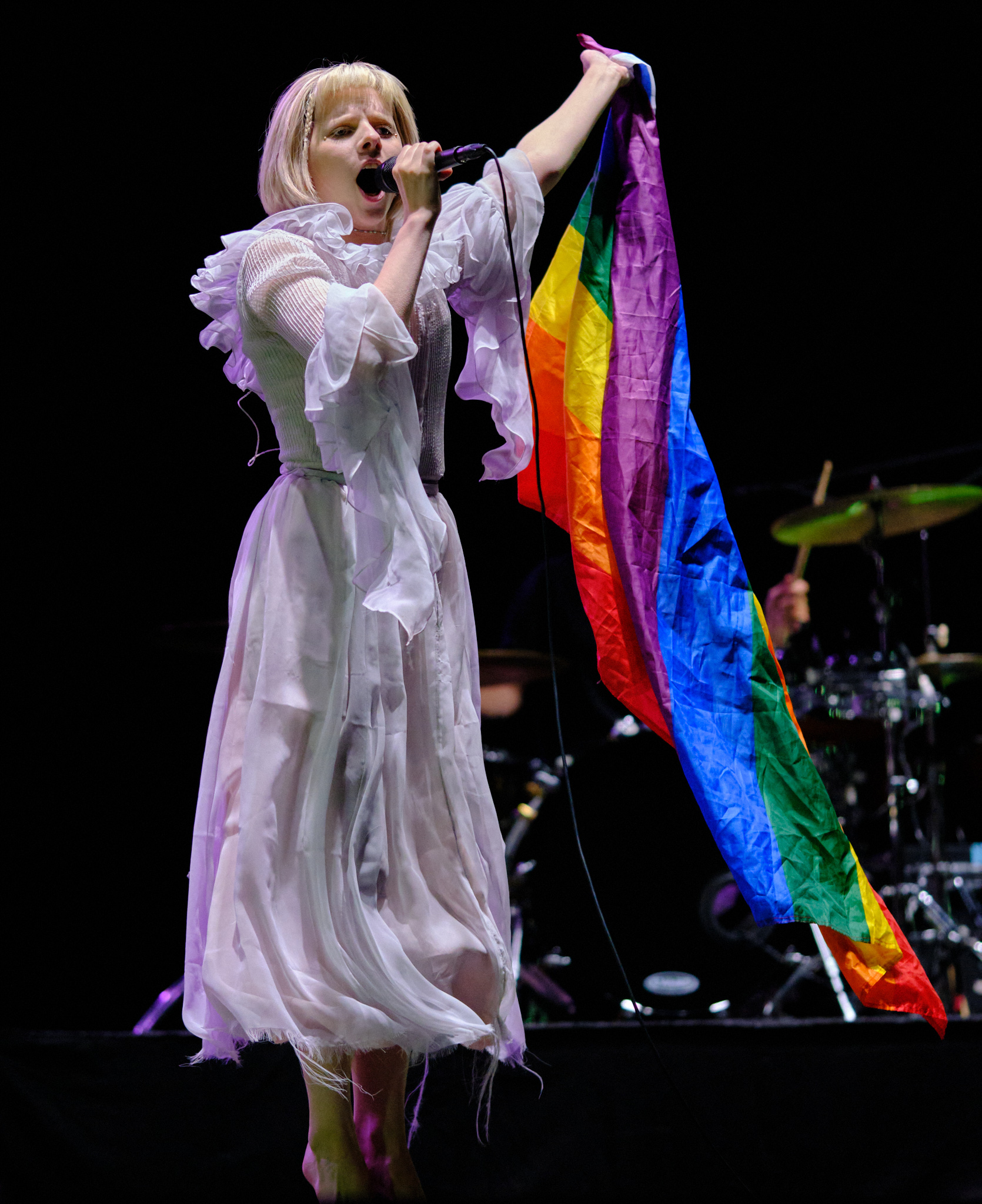
Aurora is an advocate for LGBTQ rights and openly bisexual since 2018.

Aurora initially drew attention for her distinctive appearance, including a "childlike" look, pale skin without makeup, and short platinum blonde hair that matched the colour of her eyebrows, in contrast to her vocal maturity and emotional depth of her music. She later adopted a partially shaved hairstyle described as "Norwegian Viking", and from 2018 to 2024, she became known for a layered haircut—long in the front and short in the back—similar to styles seen in anime. During the promotional period between her releases Infections of a Different Kind (Step 1) and A Different Kind of Human (Step 2), Aurora frequently performed with facial markings that symbolised "tears and smile wrinkles." Her onstage persona is often noted for its candid humor, shaped by her openness about intrusive thoughts, which she frequently shares with audiences during live performances.

Her wardrobe primarily consists of reused garments, many of which are designed by Aurora herself in collaboration with her sister Viktoria. A pescatarian, Aurora has emphasized the importance of conscious food choices as part of a broader environmentally aware lifestyle.

Aurora identifies as a feminist and advocates for a range of human rights causes, including racial equality and LGBTQ rights. She identifies as an introvert and neurodivergent, and has described herself as being on the autism spectrum. In an interview, she explained that she can become tired and burned out from talking to people, saying, “yes, we can say ‘on the spectrum’, so to speak”. In a 2018 interview with L'Officiel, she described herself as bisexual, while expressing a preference for embracing love and exploration without rigid labels. Aurora also showed support for various environmental awareness movements, topics that she explored in songs like "Apple Tree", "The Seed", and "Soulless Creatures" from her second and third albums. She expressed admiration for environmental initiatives by figures such as Greta Thunberg and the band Coldplay.

Aurora has been active in philanthropic and advocacy work. In October 2020, she performed her song "Warrior" for volunteers of the Clean Sounds Movement and called on fellow artists Billie Eilish and Sigrid to join the cause. She participated in a number of online music festivals, including Vi er Live (a demonstration against racism and in response to the murder of George Floyd), SOS Rainforest (in support of indigenous communities and rainforests in Africa, Asia, and South America), and the Exist For Love Sessions (to promote emerging artists). In November 2021, she headlined a non-profit charity event during COP26 to raise funds for Brian Eno's EarthPercent organization. She has also been politically vocal, particularly during the Gaza War, during which she called for a permanent ceasefire and joined the "No Music for Genocide" movement, geo-blocking her music on streaming platforms in Israel to protest the conflict.

=== Controversy ===
On 26 March 2023, as Aurora concluded her performance at Lollapalooza Brasil, her drummer, Sigmund Vestrheim, gestured with his hands in a manner that some social media users interpreted as a white supremacist dog whistle. Two days later, online examination of Vestrheim's Instagram revealed what some users claimed were additional instances of dog whistles and Nazi symbolism, including a drawing featuring the numbers 777 and a swastika. Aurora addressed the situation on her social media, stating that none of her band members support right-wing ideologies and denying that the drummer had any connection to hate movements. A few days later, Aurora announced that Vestrheim would be replaced for the upcoming shows of the tour in Mexico, citing safety concerns. In an interview with VG, Aurora confirmed that the drummer would be returning to the band and dismissed the accusations as "absurd," describing them as "nonsense and a waste of time."

== Achievements ==
Since her debut with "Awakening" in 2014, Aurora [...] has created musical magic with a crystal-clear voice, uncompromising songwriting, and magnetic tracks like "Runaway" and "Cure for Me". [...] She sheds light on outsider status and celebrates uniqueness, becoming a role model and guiding star in Nordic pop—a vital part of Norwegian music history.

— The P3 Gull jury's reasoning for why Aurora should be honoured with the P3 Prize in 2022.

Aurora has risen to prominence as one of Norway's biggest contemporary artists. She has been referred to as the "Fairy of Pop" and stands as the most-streamed female Norwegian artist of all time, with more than 10 billion streams. This achievement places her third on the overall list of most-streamed Norwegian artists, behind only Alan Walker and Kygo. She has toured in more than 50 countries worldwide and has been described as an "extremely international artist" by Laura Monks, co-president of Decca Records.

Norwegian and international critics have praised her songwriting and stage presence. Espen Borge of NRK P3 has called her "one of the world's most successful creators," highlighting her songwriting skills and vocal expressiveness. Jem Aswad of Variety has described her as one of Norway's biggest acts and a veteran of the country's music scene, while Andrew Trendell of NME has identified her as a pioneer of Norwegian art-pop. Catharina Cheung of Time Out, Aurora Henni Krogh of 730.no, and the organisers of Øya Festival have recognised her as the country's biggest pop star in recent years. Tina Løvås of Musikknyheter.no has named her "one of Norway's biggest artists of all time," noting that her discography has left a significant mark on Norwegian music history.

In her hometown of Os, then-mayor Terje Søviknes credited Aurora with leading the "Os Wave"—the local equivalent of the Bergen Wave—by inspiring a new generation of artists. He stated:

"If you have had the Bergen Wave, we have the Os Wave with Aurora at the forefront. [...] Aurora's success makes others dare to pursue her dream. Aurora is leading the Os Wave forward and paving the way for the next generation."

She has received praise from fellow artists including Ane Brun, Billie Eilish, Doja Cat, Katy Perry, Oli Sykes, Shawn Mendes, SZA, and Troye Sivan. Billie Eilish has credited "Runaway" as the inspiration for her decision to pursue a music career. Björk attended Aurora's KEXP session in Reykjavík, an appearance that led Dusty Henry to describe her as a "big fucking deal."

Aurora has earned numerous accolades, including the P3 Prize at the P3 Gull for her impact on Norwegian music, four Spellemann Awards, and an EBBA Award for international success with her debut EP Running with the Wolves. At the age of 21, she became the youngest person to receive a stone on the Bergen Walk of Fame. She was named to the Forbes 30 Under 30 list in 2025 and had sold over one million albums worldwide by July 2021. In 2026, a newly discovered species of orchid in Australia, Thelymitra aurorae, was named after her.

== Discography ==
- All My Demons Greeting Me as a Friend (2016)
- Infections of a Different Kind (Step 1) (2018)
- A Different Kind of Human (Step 2) (2019)
- The Gods We Can Touch (2022)
- What Happened to the Heart? (2024)

== Videography ==
Filmography

Year	Title	Role	Note
2015	Into the Light	Herself	Short film
2016	Nothing is Eternal	Herself	Documentary
2019	Frozen 2	The Voice	
2020	Once Aurora	Herself	Documentary
2022	A Touch of the Divine	Herself	Streaming film
2025	Portrait of a Song	Herself	"Runaway" documentary
2026	What Happened to the Earth? Live from Mexico City	Herself	

Television

Year	Title	Role	Note
2017	Creeped Out	Narrator	Television series
2017	Concert with Aurora from Nidaros Cathedral	Herself	Christmas concert

== Ludography ==
Video games

Year	Title	Note
2019	Sky: Children of the Light	Provides vocals for the game's intro and outro songs
2022	Assassin's Creed	Video game soundtrack
2024	Senua's Saga: Hellblade II	Video game soundtrack
2025	Genshin Impact	Video game soundtrack
2026	World of Warcraft	Video game soundtrack

== Written works ==
- The Gods We Can Touch (2023)
- What Happened to the Heart? (2024)
- All My Demons Greeting Me as a Friend (2026)

== See also ==
- Music of Norway
- List of Norwegian musicians
- List of number-one albums in Norway
