= Petroleum Records =

- Petroleum Records Logo
- Founded: 1999
- Status: Active
- Country of origin: Norway
- Location: Oslo
- Official website: petroleumrecords.no

Petroleum Records (formerly Metropol Music ) is a Norwegian record label.

== Signees ==
The label's roster includes Thomas Dybdahl, Sondre Justad, Aurora, Kvelertak, Bjorn Eidsvag, and Kaizers Orchestra. The label signed Aurora in 2014.
