= The Conflict of the Mind =

2024 single by Aurora

Single by Aurora

from the album What Happened to the Heart?
- Released: 18 January 2024
- Genre: Classic pop
- Length: 4:15
- Label: Decca; Glassnote
- Songwriters: Aurora Aksnes; Chris Greatti
- Producers: Aurora; Chris Greatti

Aurora singles chronology
"Your Blood" (2024)	"The Conflict of the Mind" (2024)	"Some Type of Skin" (2024)

Music video
- "The Conflict of the Mind" on YouTube

"The Conflict of the Mind" is a song by Norwegian singer-songwriter Aurora for her fifth studio album, What Happened to the Heart? (2024). It was released on 18 January 2024, through Decca and Glassnote, as the second single from the album. The classic pop song blends a soft electronic beat with elements of jazz and soul. Lyrically, it explores themes of isolation and mental health. Aurora and Chris Greatti wrote and produced "The Conflict of the Mind".

"The Conflict of the Mind" was praised by critics for its introspective but emotional message. Aurora co-directed a music video for the song with Kaveh Nabatian.

== Background ==
"The Conflict of the Mind" was written by Aurora and produced by Chris Greatti. A classic pop song, it blends a soft electronic beat with elements of jazz and soul and features a soaring vocal performance from Aurora. The song's looped vocal arpeggios were compared to the works of Kate Bush. Lyrically, it explores themes of isolation and mental health, carrying an empowering message that emotional pain is temporary. The chorus reinforces this sentiment with the lines:

"Don't let your spirit die / This is just a conflict of the mind / Is your heart alive? / You'll overcome a conflict of the mind."

In the song's astutely poetic lyrics, Aurora pleads with a loved one to open up emotionally. She expresses the inner turmoil of witnessing someone she cares about in pain, singing:

"Only when I see you cry / I feel conflicted in my mind / It fills my heart up and it breaks me at the very same time."

== Music video ==
The accompanying music video was co-directed by Aurora and Kaveh Nabatian. It portrays Aurora at a family dinner, struggling to fit in while those around her also battle their own internal pain. Reflecting on the song's theme, Aurora stated that she tends to isolate herself when in pain but has learned the importance of allowing loved ones to support her. She emphasized that opening up and talking about pain is a crucial part of healing, particularly within families.

== Critical reception ==
In a review for Melomaniacsmag, Noah F. praised the song's introspective nature and soothing quality, likening it to a comforting embrace—one that balances warmth and melancholy, characteristic of Aurora's musical style. He noted the song's layered production and emotional depth, emphasizing its ability to resonate with listeners on a personal level.
