= Come Closer (Tomora album) =

Studio album by Tomora
- Released: 17 April 2026
- Studios: Rowlands Audio Research, Sussex, England; The Raven's Nest, Norway
- Genres: Electronica; trip hop; techno
- Length: 55:19
- Labels: Fontana; Capitol
- Producers: Tom Rowlands; Aurora

Singles from Come Closer
- 1. "Ring the Alarm" Released: 4 December 2025; 2. "Come Closer" Released: 4 February 2026; 3. "Somewhere Else" Released: 3 March 2026; 4. "I Drink the Light" Released: 16 April 2026

Come Closer (stylized in all caps) is the debut studio album by the electronic music supergroup Tomora, composed of English producer Tom Rowlands and Norwegian singer-songwriter Aurora. It was released on 17 April 2026 through Fontana and Capitol Records.

== Background ==
Come Closer developed from studio sessions that were not initially intended to result in a full-length release. Rowlands said the pair began making music "without any idea that it would lead to anything or that we were even making an album", adding that he "cherished this moment of freedom, creativity and making something great".

The sessions followed previous collaborations between the pair, including Aurora's contributions to the Chemical Brothers' album No Geography and Rowlands' production work on Aurora's album What Happened to the Heart?.

The album's visual direction was developed alongside the music with director Adam Smith, a long-time collaborator of Rowlands' work with The Chemical Brothers, involved early in the process, including during recording sessions in Norway. Smith said, "Tom and Aurora started playing me stuff quite early on", and described the work as "very collaborative between the three of us".

Rowlands described the album as exploring themes of connection, stating that it is "about the search for some connection". Aurora also discussed the collaboration as reflecting a broader creative freedom to pursue new directions, framing the project as a reminder that "we are free" and "allowed to change direction".

== Promotion ==
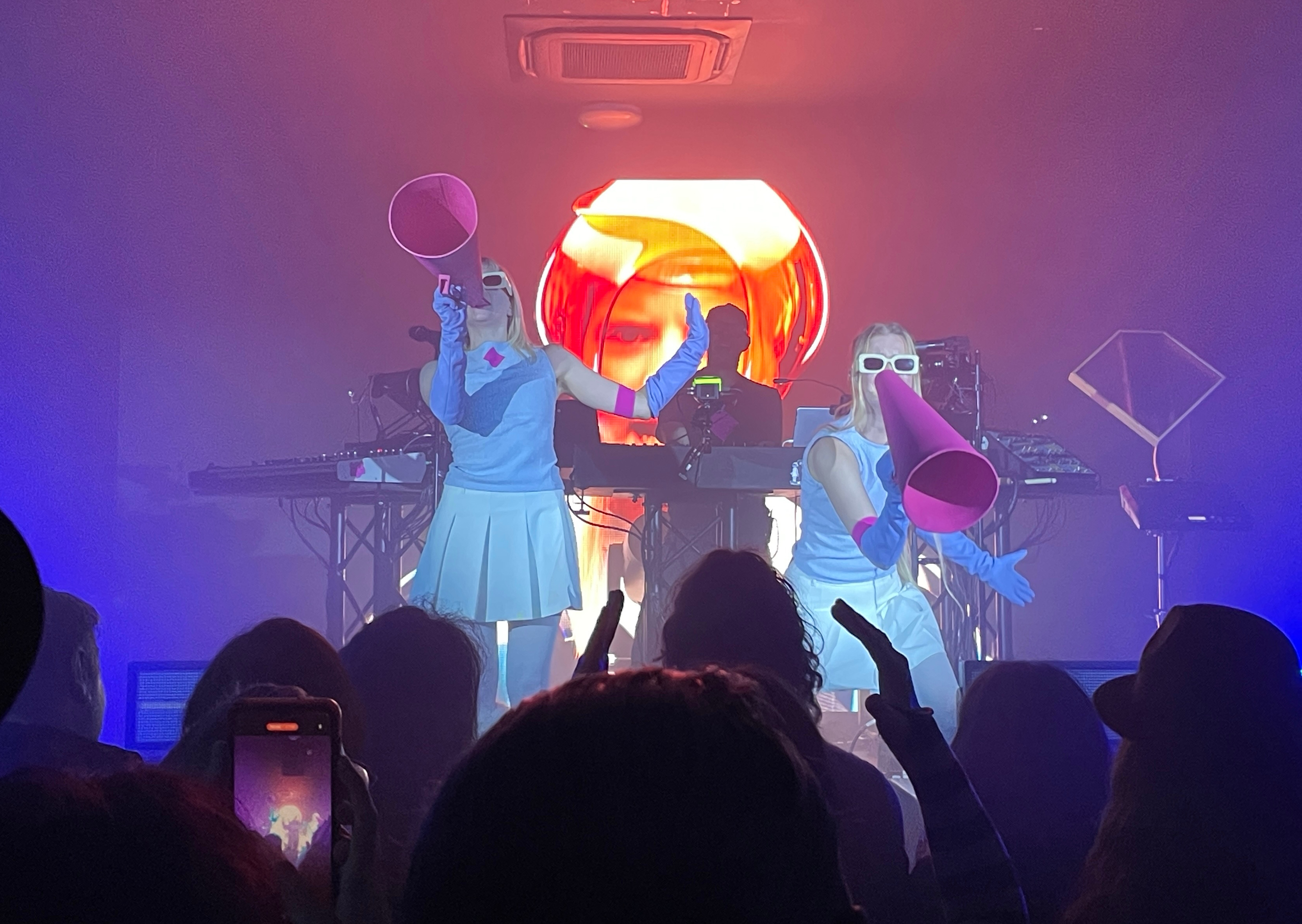
Rowlands (centre) and Aurora (left) performing "Eve of Destruction" from No Geography as Tomora in 2026

Early material from Come Closer was previewed in live DJ sets prior to the album's announcement. The tracks "Ring the Alarm" and "Somewhere Else" were first played during DJ performances by The Chemical Brothers and Tom Rowlands in mid-2025, months before Tomora was formally revealed. The name "Tomora" began appearing on festival lineups, notably Coachella, leading to fan and press speculation regarding their identities.

On 4 December 2025, the group released "Ring the Alarm" as the lead single, accompanied by the B-side "The Thing", which appeared on a limited-edition vinyl release. The album was announced on 4 February 2026 alongside the release of the title track. On 3 March 2026, "Somewhere Else" was released as the third single. On 16 April 2026, "I Drink the Light" was released as the fourth single. Music videos directed by Adam Smith were released for the album's singles.

The group announced a tour in support of the album, with dates across Europe, North America and Asia. They performed their first show as Tomora at New Century Hall in Manchester.

== Critical reception ==
Professional ratings
Aggregate scores
Source	Rating
AnyDecentMusic?	6.9/10
Metacritic	76/100
Review scores
Source	Rating
AllMusic	3.5/5 stars
The Arts Desk	5/5 stars
Dork	3/5 stars
Financial Times	4/5 stars
The Irish Times	4/5 stars
The Line of Best Fit	4/10
NME	4/5 stars
NRK P3	6/6
Riff Magazine	8/10

Upon its release, Come Closer received generally positive reviews from critics. According to the review aggregator Metacritic, it received “generally favorable reviews” based on a weighted average score of 76 out of 100 from 6 critic reviews.

Ludovic Hunter-Tilney of the Financial Times described the album as a “well-matched relationship” that is “expressive and dynamic”, writing that “the musical textures have the same crunchy, tangy feel as The Chemical Brothers’ work”. Writing for The Irish Times, Ed Power likewise called it a “mesmerising melding of two minds”, praising its “engaging fusion of Rowlands’s propulsive electronica and Aurora’s icy, eerie singing”. In The Arts Desk, Thomas H. Green awarded the album five stars, writing that its “genius” lies in how “everything should collapse in an unfocused mess” yet instead “maintain[s] pinpoint excitement, nailing pop melodies, finding beauty and emotion amongst the enormousness and possibility of it all”. Andrew Trendell of NME described it as “an otherworldly rave” and “a debut worth dancing about”. Writing for The Guardian, Michael Cragg described the album as a “head-spinning mix of techno and trip-hop”.

Some critics noted inconsistencies across the record. Dork described the album as "overstimulating, eerie, weird and wild", writing that it "can feel unbalanced" when the two artists do not "move in step", though "when they do, they're capable of something genuinely arresting". Writing for The Line of Best Fit, Noah Barker gave the album a score of 4/10, describing it as "hostage to 90s Euro-Club-isms" and arguing that the collaboration "brings out the worst in each participant".

== Track listing ==
All tracks are written by Tom Rowlands and Aurora Aksnes; "In a Minute" co-written with Amalie Holt Kleive.

Come Closer track listing
No.	Title	Length
1.	"Please"	0:31
2.	"Come Closer"	4:28
3.	"A Boy Like You"	5:00
4.	"Ring the Alarm"	5:31
5.	"My Baby"	4:05
6.	"Have You Seen Me Dance Alone?"	4:21
7.	"Somewhere Else"	4:11
8.	"I Drink the Light"	7:56
9.	"Wavelengths"	5:27
10.	"Side by Side"	2:57
11.	"The Thing"	5:38
12.	"In a Minute"	5:14
Total length:		55:19

Japanese edition bonus tracks
No.	Title	Length
13.	"Wavelengths (Who Am I?)"	3:03
Total length:		58:25

== Personnel ==
Credits are adapted from Tidal.

=== Tomora ===
- Tom Rowlands – production, mixing, bass, drum kit, guitar, synthesizer
- Aurora – vocals, production

=== Technical ===
- Steve Dub – mixing
- Mike Marsh – mastering
- Magnus Skylstad – vocal production on "Wavelengths"
- Ash Soan – drum kit on "Side by Side"

== Charts ==
Chart performance for Come Closer
Chart (2026)	Peak position
Belgian Albums (Ultratop Flanders)	53
Belgian Albums (Ultratop Wallonia)	133
French Albums (SNEP)	106
German Albums (Offizielle Top 100)	45
Japanese Dance & Soul Albums (Oricon)	2
Japanese Download Albums (Billboard Japan)	44
Japanese Top Albums Sales (Billboard Japan)	65
Japanese Western Albums (Oricon)	9
Norwegian Albums (IFPI Norge)	19
Scottish Albums (Official Charts)	4
UK Albums (Official Charts)	16
UK Dance Albums (Official Charts)	1
