= Your Blood =

2023 single by Aurora

Single by Aurora

from the album What Happened to the Heart?
- Released: 8 November 2023
- Genre: Indie pop
- Length: 4:08
- Label: Decca; Universal; Glassnote
- Songwriters: Aurora Aksnes; Chris Greatti
- Producers: Aurora; Chris Greatti

Aurora singles chronology
"My Sails Are Set" (2023)	"Your Blood" (2023)	"The Conflict of the Mind" (2024)

Music video
- "Your Blood" on YouTube

"Your Blood" is a song recorded by Norwegian singer-songwriter Aurora for her fifth studio album, What Happened to the Heart? (2024). She wrote and produced it along with Chris Greatti. It was released through Decca Records and Universal Music Group on 8 November 2023 as the lead single from the album. The song marked Aurora's first release of new solo musical material in nearly two years since her previous 2022 album The Gods We Can Touch. An indie pop track with synthesizer-infused instrumentals, "Your Blood" was compared by music critics to the works of the Swedish rock band the Cardigans.

== Background ==
Aurora first teased a new song on 27 October 2023 while sharing, in her X (formerly Twitter) official account, an audio video and a link to pre-save the song, with the caption "08.11". On 31 October, she shared a video and audio clip with an emoji of a blood drop. On the following day, she officially announced the release of "Your Blood", along with its cover artwork. She also confirmed a series of concert dates in Norway. She said in a statement: "Hello my darlings. I've been feeling slightly torn about releasing new music, when there’s so much pain in the world. But with time I've decided there might be no better time to give you a little song... Than now". Aurora referred to the Gaza humanitarian crisis as a result of the Gaza war.

== Composition ==
"You Blood" was co-written and co-produced by Aurora and Chris Greatti in Los Angeles, and mixed by Mitch McCarthy. It is an indie pop track fueled by synthesizers and guitars, and finds the singer "letting her guard down in an ode to the human soul, celebrating its vulnerability, emotions and flaws". Discussing the announcement of the song, she stated:

"The world is always bleeding. And you never know what is going on under people's skin. I think it’s only when we reach out to each other, that we understand what compassion and beauty we are capable of as human beings. Even if we can’t understand what people are going through: we should still try. If we don’t, what is a life truly worth? Sometimes addressing the pain, your own, or the pain of the world hurts so much it feels like dying. But in truth, I believe it is then we are born. Your blood. My blood. Our blood".

== Critical reception ==
While including the song on their list of Queer Jams of the Week, "Your Blood" was described by Billboard as a "truly undeniable pop banger". In album reviews of What Happened to the Heart, several critics found similarities between "Your Blood" and the works of the Swedish rock band the Cardigans. For Stereoboard, Will Marshall said that the syncopation of its backing instruments "elevate the song".

== Release history ==
Release dates and formats for "Your Blood"
Region	Date	Format	Label	Ref.
Various	8 November 2023	Digital download; streaming	Decca	
Italy	8 November 2023	Radio airplay	Universal	
