= Some Type of Skin =

2024 single by Aurora

Single by Aurora

from the album What Happened to the Heart?
- Released: 20 March 2024
- Genre: Synth-pop; alternative pop
- Length: 3:12
- Label: Decca; Glassnote
- Songwriters: Aurora Aksnes; Chris Greatti
- Producers: Aurora; Chris Greatti

Aurora singles chronology
"The Conflict of the Mind" (2024)	"Some Type of Skin" (2024)	"Starvation" (2024)

Music video
- "Some Type of Skin" on YouTube

"Some Type of Skin" is a song by Norwegian singer-songwriter and record producer Aurora from her fifth studio album, What Happened to the Heart? (2024). It was released through Decca and Glassnote Records on 20 March 2024 as the third single off the record. Aurora and Chris Greatti wrote and produced "Some Type of Skin", a synth-pop and alternative pop track with elements of electropop in which the singer calls for peace. An accompanying music video directed by Kaveh Nabatian was released alongside it.

== Background ==
A week after the release of "Some Type of Skin", Aurora announced her third studio album, entitled What Happened to the Heart?, along with its release date and cover artwork.

== Composition ==
Named by NME as introspective, "Some Type of Skin" is a synth-pop and alternative pop track with elements of electropop, and a "folkloric light". British magazine DIY described the song as a "simultaneously euphoric and melancholic earworm".

== Music video ==
A music video for "Some Type of Skin" was released on the same day as the song. Directed by Kaveh Nabatian, it sees Aurora dancing and moving through a room with black mannequins. She is dressed in all white and sometimes caresses the figures.

== Charts ==
Chart performance for "Some Type of Skin"
Chart (2025)	Peak position
Japan Hot Overseas (Billboard Japan)	15

== Release history ==
Release dates and formats for "Some Type of Skin"
Region	Date	Format	Label	Ref.
Various	20 March 2024	Digital download; streaming	Decca; Glassnote	
Italy	22 March 2024	Radio airplay	Universal	
