= What Happened to the Heart? =

2024 studio album by Aurora

Studio album by Aurora
- Released: 7 June 2024
- Genres: Indie pop; disco
- Length: 62:01
- Labels: Decca; Glassnote; Petroleum
- Producers: Aurora; Chris Greatti; Dave Hamelin; Vetle Junker; Nicolas Rebscher; Tom Rowlands; Magnus Skylstad; Fredrik Svabø; Matias Tellez

Aurora chronology
The Gods We Can Touch (2022)	What Happened to the Heart? (2024)	Come Closer (2026)

Deluxe cover

Singles from What Happened to the Heart?
- 1. "Your Blood" Released: 8 November 2023; 2. "The Conflict of the Mind" Released: 18 January 2024; 3. "Some Type of Skin" Released: 20 March 2024; 4. "Starvation" Released: 7 June 2024

What Happened to the Heart? is the fifth studio album by Norwegian singer-songwriter and record producer Aurora. It was released on 7 June 2024 through Decca, Glassnote and Petroleum Records. Written and recorded between Norway, Germany, the United Kingdom, and the United States, Aurora worked with Ane Brun, Matias Tellez, Tom Rowlands, Chris Greatti, Dave Hamelin, and Magnus Skylstad on its production.

Inspired by a letter co-written by indigenous activists, Aurora began working on the album during a world tour in support of her previous release, The Gods We Can Touch, and conceived it as a cathartic process. It is an indie pop and disco album with elements of techno and folk music. The album was supported by the release of four singles, "Your Blood", "The Conflict of the Mind", "Some Type of Skin", "Starvation", and the promotional single "To Be Alright". To promote the album, Aurora embarked on the headlining world concert tour What Happened to the Earth? in 2024 and 2025. The lead single from the deluxe edition, "The Flood", was released on 2 May 2025.

What Happened to the Heart? received acclaim from music critics, with praise towards its themes and sound. It debuted at number five in her native Norway, and also within the top ten in four other nations. At the 2025 Spellemannprisen, What Happened to the Heart? received a total of two nominations, including Release of the Year.

== Background and conception ==
Everything we do is about greed, about money, about mass consumption, capitalism. There's war everywhere, genocide in Gaza, countries under water, flowers in Antarctica. The planet is, well, fucked. We are ruining our land, mistreating our animals, our women and each other. We have stopped leading from the heart.

— Aurora in the interview with The Forty-Five

In April 2022, Aurora read a letter co-written by indigenous activists titled "We Are the Earth", which, according to the magazine The Line of Best Fit, "changed her life". The letter called for a revolution: a collective response to global warming. They described the planet as "the heart that pulsates within us", a statement that led Aurora to create the album's title and concept. She began writing the album while on tour for The Gods We Can Touch, her previous album released on 21 January 2022. In January 2023, Aurora confirmed that she was back in the recording studio working on new music, which she called "so many babies". What Happened to the Heart? was recorded and produced between Norway, Germany, London, and Los Angeles. On the album, Aurora worked with her close collaborator Magnus Skylstad, along with musicians Ane Brun, Matias Tellez, Tom Rowlands of The Chemical Brothers, Chris Greatti, and Dave Hamelin.

What Happened to the Heart? was announced via her social media accounts on 28 March 2024. She has dubbed the album as the most personal and cathartic project in her career. In a press release, she added: "Though its precise function and anatomy were not clearly understood, the heart was believed to be the centre of the soul. Of intuition. Of emotion and intention. Until we decided these were qualifications of the mind. Emotion overpowered by logic. And with the world being so corrupted by money, power and selfishness you cannot help but ask yourself – what happened to the heart?". Being interviewed by NME, the singer said that the title of the album is "the most important, beautiful and sad question I've ever wondered in my life".

== Composition ==
What Happened to the Heart? is an indie pop and disco album, including inspirations from pop, techno, and folk music. Containing 16 tracks, the album differs from the sound of the singles, as stated by Aurora before the album's release. Its overall lyrics talk about the constant loss of spiritual connection in modern life, and question the lack of humanity in the society. It also touches on other themes such as climate change, capitalism, and personal problems.

=== Songs ===
The opening track, "Echo of My Shadow", begins the album similarly to a prayer, where Aurora "sings life and hope back into the world". It is led by subdued vocals and strings. "To Be Alright", the second track, was compared by DIY's Otis Robinson to the works of English singer Kate Bush. It is a disco-pop track with a 1990s dance tempo, in which she switches between soprano and a soft baritone. The third track, "Your Blood", is an "antithetical happy-go-lucky" indie pop song with electric guitars and melodies reminiscent of the Swedish rock band the Cardigans. The track showcases Aurora's vocal range, also switching between pitches. On "The Conflict of the Mind", Aurora pleads with a lover to open up. The folkloric "Some Type of Skin" is primarily a synth-pop, alternative pop, and Europop song, with elements of electropop. "The Dark Dresses Lightly" is a look after a break-up fueled with anguish, rage and resentment. "My Name", described by Aurora as "a very existential song", features Norwegian songwriter Ane Brun, and contains tiredness of "unhealed trauma and collective ignorance to environmental overconsumption". The folk-infused "Do You Feel?" is followed by "Starvation", which incorporates disco and 1980s synth-pop, with elements of electronica music and psychedelic beats; in the song, she confronts human arrogance and avoidance.

== Promotion ==
=== Singles ===
What Happened to the Heart? was preceded by the release of three singles. The song "Your Blood" was released on 8 November 2023 as the lead single from the album. It marked her first solo musical material since The Gods We Can Touch in 2022. The second single, titled "The Conflict of the Mind", was released on 18 January 2024 alongside its music video. "Some Type of Skin" was released as the third single from the record on 20 March 2024. She performed it for the first time during an intimate show at London's Lafayette. The first promotional single, "To Be Alright", was released as digital on 31 May. "Starvation" was sent to radio airplay alongside the album as its fourth single. The music videos for "Your Blood", "The Conflict of the Mind", "Some Type of Skin", and "Starvation" were co-directed by Kaveh Nabatian and Aurora.

On 4 April 2025, Aurora released "The Flood" as the deluxe single from her album. She described the song as follows: "This is a song about the invisible enemy — what brings you anger, what causes worry and sadness, what makes you retreat into yourself instead of facing the world fully. It's about the search for someone or something to blame, even when you know deep down that the only solution lies within yourself."

=== Tour ===
To promote What Happened to the Heart?, Aurora embarked on her fifth concert tour, titled What Happened to the Earth?, between 2024 and 2025. It was announced alongside the album on 28 March 2024. The tour started on 26 June 2024 at the National Stadium in Dublin, and will conclude on 15 November 2025 at the Autódromo Hermanos Rodríguez in Mexico City.

== Critical reception ==
Professional ratings
Aggregate scores
Source	Rating
Metacritic	82/100
Review scores
Source	Rating
AllMusic	3.5/5 stars
DIY	4.5/5 stars
Hot Press	8/10
The Line of Best Fit	7/10
NME	4/5 stars
Riff Magazine	8/10
Slant Magazine	4/5 stars
Stereoboard	3.5/5 stars
The Telegraph	5/5 stars

Upon its release, What Happened to the Heart? was met with critical acclaim. According to the review aggregator Metacritic, What Happened to the Heart? received "universal acclaim" based on a weighted average score of 82 out of 100 from 6 critic scores.

Lauren Shirreff from The Telegraph wrote that "reckoning with self-destructive feelings of fear, dissociation, and anger, the album is a journey to personal healing", and highlighted the last track, "Invisible Wounds", as a standout." NME critic Andrew Trendell opined that the album is an "epic career-high, throwing up shapes along with reasons to live and to love". For Hot Press, Caroline Kelly wrote that it represents Aurora's "definitive attempt to craft an ecosystem around her work", and described it as "an offering of rhetorical questions and resounding affirmations, with a sweeping sonic palette".

While praising "Earthly Delights" and "When the Dark Dresses Lightly", Stereoboard's Will Marshall wrote that What Happened to the Heart? offers "another slate of intense musical arrangements, theatrical vocals and radio-ready hits with her own unique twist". Otis Robinson of DIY ended his review by saying: "Monolithic in nature, the world-building on What Happened to the Heart? makes a bleeding heart – both for self and the earth – appear rapturous and unfathomably healing".

== Accolades ==
What Happened to the Heart? was nominated at the 2025 Spellemannprisen for Release of the Year and Alternative Pop. It marked Aurora's first nomination for the former since 2017 for her debut studio album, All My Demons Greeting Me as a Friend, when it was presented as Album of the Year.

Year	Award	Category	Result	Ref.
2025	Spellemannprisen	Release of the Year	Nominated	
2025	Spellemannprisen	Alternative Pop	Nominated	
2025	Edvardprisen	Popular	Pending	

== Commercial performance ==
In the United Kingdom, the album debuted at number eight on the UK Albums Chart with 6,100 album-equivalent units, earning her second top ten and being her biggest opening week in the region surpassing her fourth studio album, The Gods We Can Touch.

== Track listing ==
What Happened to the Heart – standard edition
No.	Title	Writer(s)	Producer(s)	Length
1.	"Echo of My Shadow"	Aurora Aksnes; Matias Tellez	Aurora; Tellez	4:05
2.	"To Be Alright"	Aksnes; Tellez	Aurora; Tellez	4:06
3.	"Your Blood"	Aksnes; Chris Greatti	Aurora; Greatti	4:07
4.	"The Conflict of the Mind"	Aksnes; Greatti	Aurora; Greatti	4:15
5.	"Some Type of Skin"	Aksnes; Greatti	Aurora; Greatti	3:11
6.	"The Essence"	Aksnes; Nicolas Rebscher; Michelle Leonard	Aurora; Rebscher	3:10
7.	"Earthly Delights"	Aksnes; Tellez	Aurora; Tellez	3:21
8.	"The Dark Dresses Lightly"	Aksnes; Rebscher; Leonard	Aurora; Rebscher	3:35
9.	"A Soul with No King"	Aksnes; Fredrik Svabø	Aurora; Svabø	4:24
10.	"Dreams"	Aksnes; Vetle Junker	Aurora; Junker	4:24
11.	"My Name" (featuring Ane Brun)	Aksnes; Ane Brun; Magnus Skylstad	Aurora; Skylstad; Tom Rowlands	3:20
12.	"Do You Feel?"	Aksnes; Skylstad	Aurora; Skylstad	3:02
13.	"Starvation"	Aksnes; Rebscher; Leonard	Aurora; Rebscher	3:28
14.	"The Blade"	Aksnes; Rebscher; Leonard	Aurora; Rebscher; Dave Hamelin	4:33
15.	"My Body Is Not Mine"	Aksnes; Skylstad; Rowlands	Aurora; Skylstad	4:01
16.	"Invisible Wounds"	Aksnes; Tellez	Aurora; Tellez	4:59
Total length:				62:01

What Happened to the Heart – deluxe edition
No.	Title	Writer(s)	Producer(s)	Length
17.	"The Flood"	Aksnes; Greatti	Aurora; Greatti	4:29
18.	"Hearts Intuition"	Aksnes; Skylstad	Aurora; Skylstad	3:21
19.	"The Weight of Missing"	Aksnes	Svabø	6:34
20.	"Dreams" (featuring Nicole Zignago)	Aksnes; Junker	Aurora; Junker	4:24
21.	"Some Type of Skin" (featuring Atarashii Gakko!)	Aksnes; Greatti	Aurora; Greatti; Yonkey; Yoshio Tamamura	3:35
Total length:				84:24

Notes

- Digital releases of the album by Decca Records title "The Dark Dresses Lightly" as "When the Dark Dresses Lightly".

== Personnel ==
Musicians

- Aurora – lead vocals (all tracks), backing vocals (tracks 1–5, 7, 16), percussion (4, 8, 9, 13, 14); Mellotron, Mellotron programming (4); piano (5, 9), keyboards (8, 13, 14); synthesizer, drums (11, 12, 15)
- Matias Tellez – guitar, bass, keyboards, synthesizer, programming (tracks 1, 2, 7, 16)
- Adam Schoeller – drum programming (track 3)
- Asher Bank – drums (track 3)
- Chris Greatti – bass, Juno-106 programming (tracks 3–5); guitar (3, 4), percussion (3), drum programming (4), EBow guitar (5)
- Liam Hall – Juno-106 (track 3)
- Kieran Brunt – vocal ensemble conductor (tracks 5, 10, 16)
- Shards – vocal ensemble (tracks 5, 10, 16)
- Kane Richotte – drums (track 5)
- Michelle Leonard – backing vocals (tracks 6, 8, 13, 14), keyboards (8), synthesizer programming (13), synthesizer (14)
- Nicolas Rebscher – guitar (tracks 6, 8, 13, 14); bass, drum programming, keyboards, percussion (8, 13)
- Steve Durham – drums (tracks 8, 14)
- Håkon Aase – fiddle (tracks 9, 11, 12)
- Vetle Junker – vocals, guitar, drums, programming (track 10)
- Magnus Skylstad – bass, synthesizer, drums, percussion (tracks 11, 12, 15)
- Runyu Qian – pipa (track 11)
- Ane Brun – vocals (track 11)
- Fredrik Svabø – bass (track 12)
- Dave Hamelin – keyboards, percussion, drum programming (track 14)
- Tom Rowlands – synthesizer, drums, drum programming (track 15)

Technical

- Alex Wharton – mastering
- Mitch McCarthy – mixing
- Chris Greatti – recording (tracks 3–5, 13)
- Nicolas Rebscher – recording (tracks 6, 8, 13, 14)
- Fredrik Svabø – recording (track 9)
- Vetle Junker – recording (track 10)
- Magnus Skylstad – recording (tracks 11, 12, 15)
- George Chung – drum recording (tracks 8, 14)
- Kieran Brunt – vocal ensemble recording, vocal ensemble arrangement (tracks 5, 10, 16)
- Sam Okell – vocal ensemble recording (track 10)
- Matias Tellez – recording arrangement (tracks 1, 2, 7, 16)
- Andreas Høvset – recording assistance (tracks 1, 2, 7, 16)

Visuals

- Yuck – cover art, design
- Trent van der Werf – additional design
- Wanda Martin – photography

== Charts ==
Chart performance
Chart (2024–2025)	Peak position
Australian Hitseekers Albums (ARIA)	13
Austrian Albums (Ö3 Austria)	36
Belgian Albums (Ultratop Flanders)	15
Belgian Albums (Ultratop Wallonia)	39
Dutch Albums (Album Top 100)	9
French Albums (SNEP)	37
German Albums (Offizielle Top 100)	10
Greek Albums (IFPI)	94
Irish Albums (Official Charts)	50
Italian Albums (FIMI)	96
Norwegian Albums (VG-lista)	5
Polish Albums (ZPAV)	92
Scottish Albums (Official Charts)	4
Swiss Albums (Schweizer Hitparade)	81
UK Albums (Official Charts)	8
US Heatseekers Albums (Billboard)	20

== Certifications ==
Certifications and sales
Region	Certification	Certified units/sales
United Kingdom	—	7,023

== Release history ==
Release dates and formats
Region	Date	Format(s)	Label	Ref.
Various	7 June 2024	CD; streaming; vinyl LP	Decca; Glassnote; Petroleum	
