= Rory Kramer =

American photographer and filmmaker

- Occupations: Photographer, Filmmaker
- Television: Dare to Live
- Spouse: Amy Disser
- Parent(s): Tom and Susan Kramer
- Website: rorykramer.life

Rory Kramer is an American photographer and filmmaker best known for directing music videos and his MTV show Dare to Live. He has toured with 3lau and Martin Garrix, and made the music video for Avicii's "The Nights".

== Early life ==
Kramer was raised in Tell City, Indiana. His family owns a home in Clear Lake, Indiana.

== Career ==
When he was 25, Kramer moved to Los Angeles, California, to pursue a career in acting. He began working as a content quality controller for streaming services. After living in Los Angeles for about four years, Kramer began making small YouTube videos of his adventures. A friend offered Kramer a job touring with 3lau and making videos of 3lau's performances. Later, Kramer made a music video for Avicii for the song "The Nights" and toured with Martin Garrix.

In 2016, Kramer directed the lyric video for The Chainsmokers' song "Closer". The video reached one billion views on January 10, 2017. On February 4, 2018, the video reached two billion views, making it the first lyric video ever to have this many views. By September 2021, it was the 30th most-viewed video of all time, and the most viewed lyric video of all time with over 3.3 billion views on YouTube.

In 2017, Kramer starred in an MTV show, Dare to Live, which followed Kramer as he went with various celebrities on adventures. In 2020, Kramer co-directed the music video for Stuck with U, a duet by Justin Bieber and Ariana Grande that won an MTV Award.

On January 14, 2021, Kramer took 3,500 photos of Justin Bieber in three locations across Los Angeles. A photo showing Bieber crouched in Downtown Los Angeles' 2nd Street Tunnel became the cover photo for Bieber's 2021 album Justice.

== Awards ==
- MTV's Moon Man Award for 2020 Best Music Video From Home

== Personal life ==
In July 2018, Kramer was driving his car and speeding on loose gravel when he lost control of the vehicle which spun out, hit a tree, and flipped upside down. His car was totaled and Kramer stated that a speaker in his car prevented the car from crushing him and saved his life. Following the accident, Kramer posted to his Instagram account, stating that he was struggling with anxiety, depression, and his father's diagnosis with cancer, which had led to Kramer's reckless behavior.

Kramer married Amy Disser on August 22, 2020, in Clear Lake, Indiana.

== Videography ==
=== As television actor ===
Year	Title	Role	Notes	Ref.
2011	Dream Maker	Jason Smith		
2014	Tailgaters	Rory	2 episodes	
2017	Dare to Live	Self	8 episodes	
2019	The Professionals	Mikey	2 episodes	
2021	Justin Bieber: Our World	Self		

=== Music videos ===
Title	Year	Artist	Role	Ref.
The Nights	2014	Avicii	Director	
"Roses" (version 1)	2015	The Chainsmokers	Director	
"Don't Look Down" (Lyric video)	2015	Martin Garrix	Director	
"Company"	2015	Justin Bieber	Director	
"I'll Show You"	2015	Justin Bieber	Director	
"Somewhere to Run"	2015	Krewella	Director	
"What Do You Mean?" (acoustic)	2015	Justin Bieber	Director	
"Closer" (lyric video)	2016	The Chainsmokers	Director	
"All We Know"	2016	The Chainsmokers	Director	
"Paris" (Lyric video)	2017	The Chainsmokers	Director	
"You Owe Me"	2018	The Chainsmokers	Director	
"Everybody Hates Me"	2018	The Chainsmokers	Director	
"Somebody" (version 2)	2018	The Chainsmokers	Director	
"Family"	2019	The Chainsmokers & Kygo	Self	
"Stuck With U"	2020	Ariana Grande & Justin Bieber	Co-director	
"Monster"	2020	Shawn Mendes & Justin Bieber	Behind The Scenes	
"Speed Demon"	2025	Justin Bieber	Director	
