= Side Effects (The Chainsmokers song) =

Single by the Chainsmokers featuring Emily Warren

from the album Sick Boy
- Released: July 27, 2018
- Genre: Funky house; house-pop
- Length: 2:53
- Label: Disruptor; Columbia
- Songwriters: Andrew Taggart; Tony Ann; Emily Warren; Corey Sanders; Sly
- Producers: The Chainsmokers; Sly

The Chainsmokers singles chronology
"Somebody" (2018)	"Side Effects" (2018)	"Save Yourself" (2018)

Emily Warren singles chronology
"Poking Holes" (2017)	"Side Effects" (2018)	"Paranoid" (2018)

Music video
- "Side Effects" on YouTube

"Side Effects" is a song by American music production duo the Chainsmokers, featuring guest vocals from American singer Emily Warren. Written by Andrew Taggart, Warren, Tony Ann, Corey Sanders and Sly, with production handled by the Chainsmokers and Sly, it was released by Disruptor Records and Columbia Records on July 27, 2018, as the fifth single from the Chainsmokers' second studio album, Sick Boy.

== Background and release ==
The duo first teased new music on July 6, 2018, writing in a tweet: "Getting close to that time for some new music." They revealed parts of the official cover art on July 19 and 20, and officially announced the song on July 23. On July 25, KIIS-FM's Tanya Rad interviewed the duo about the single while backstage at the Hollywood Palladium, they shared who they played the song for first and the reason behind choosing this song as their next single. A day prior to the single's release, they posted a short audio teaser. "We felt it was time for a summer jam rooted in the sound we created when we first started making records," the Chainsmokers said in a press release. "Our music is always a current reflection of how we feel, what inspires, and who we are in that particular moment."

In an interview with Billboard, the duo was asked about the disco-type vibe of "Side Effects", which differs from their other releases in 2018. Andrew Taggart of the Chainsmokers said: "It's definitely funky. We felt like our music has been like in a much slower, more mellow place. And it's summertime, and we feel like we really wanted to make an upbeat summertime record—and that's what we came up with. We also made 'Sick Boy' and 'You Owe Me' during the winter, and it was a darker time and we were dealing with a bunch of personal stuff." Talking about the inspirations behind the lyrics, he said that despite their love for "writing about millennial relationships", they also "write about what [they] observe, and [they] write about making bad decisions often, but also kind of being impulsive in getting into them, and also living in the moment, as [they] find beauty in those small moments," which was demonstrated in this song. The song features Emily Warren, whom Alex Pall called "one of [their] favorite human beings", is the duo's longtime collaborator. "When you're comfortable with someone and they know you well, it's really easy to make music that you enjoy and are excited about. It's really exciting that she's featured on this record and hopefully the world loves it, 'cause I think it's time that they all get to know who Emily Warren is," Pall explained.

== Composition ==
"Side Effects" is an upbeat, disco-tinged funky house and house-pop song. It features a "slapping bassline and soft lead melody on the piano and drums" reminiscent of Bruno Mars, and sees the duo "take on a more club-ready sound than recent dance-pop hits" rather than "relying on the pop-perfect minimalism of past smashes". It has been described as a "ridiculously catchy summer anthem". Lyrically, the song is about "a self-degrading mantra", with lyrics describing being awake at 4 am with everything closed and nowhere to go.

== Music video ==
=== Background ===
The song's release was accompanied by a lyric video, but the duo promised that an official music video with a cameo by a "recognizable actress" is coming soon. "The music video, which we just filmed our part — they're filming another part in Miami — has a really amazing surprise lead actress in it," they teased on On Air with Ryan Seacrest, revealing "she's on a very popular show right now." The music video, directed by Matthew Dillon Cohen and shot at Shore Club South Beach hotel in Miami, was released on August 21, 2018. It stars American actress Camila Mendes, who is better known for her role of Veronica Lodge in television series Riverdale. Mendes wrote on Instagram alongside a teaser image before the visual's release: "It would appear that dancing in other people's music videos has become one of my favorite pastimes."

=== Synopsis ===
The video begins with Mendes' character, Riley, a hotel employee, receiving the news that she has to work throughout the weekend. Disgruntled, she decides to make the most of her unfortunate situation, taking off her maid uniform and throws a solo pool party, as she dances around the hotel on her night shift. She then encounters a security guard who refuses to be moved by her dance moves. The video then shifts to showing various events going on in different rooms in the hotel, with scenes featuring cameos by Pall, Taggart, and Warren. Towards the end, Riley jumps into the pool, accompanied by balloons and fireworks.

== Live performances ==
On July 28, 2018, the Chainsmokers made a live performance debut of "Side Effects" at their show in Atlantic City, along with Warren.

== Track listing ==
Digital download
No.	Title	Length
1.	"Side Effects"	2:53

Digital download – remixes EP
No.	Title	Length
1.	"Side Effects" (Fedde Le Grand Remix)	2:52
2.	"Side Effects" (The Magician Remix)	4:15
3.	"Side Effects" (Nolan Van Lith Remix)	3:04
4.	"Side Effects" (Barkley Remix)	2:27
5.	"Side Effects" (Sly Remix)	2:56

== Personnel ==
Credits adapted from Tidal.

- The Chainsmokers – production
- Sly – production
- Jordan Stilwell – mix engineering
- Chris Gehringer – master engineering

== Charts ==
=== Weekly charts ===
Weekly chart performance
Chart (2018)	Peak position
Argentina Anglo (Monitor Latino)	19
Australia (ARIA)	61
Belgium (Ultratop 50 Flanders)	44
Belgium Dance (Ultratop Flanders)	3
Belgium (Ultratip Bubbling Under Wallonia)	5
Belgium Dance (Ultratop Wallonia)	10
Canada Hot 100 (Billboard)	39
Colombia (National-Report)	100
Croatia (HRT)	7
Czech Republic Airplay (ČNS IFPI)	31
Czech Republic Singles Digital (ČNS IFPI)	32
Finland Airplay (Radiosoittolista)	28
Netherlands (Dutch Top 40)	14
Netherlands (Single Top 100)	67
Poland Airplay (ZPAV)	9
Portugal (AFP)	94
Romania (Airplay 100)	72
Scotland Singles (Official Charts)	40
Slovakia Airplay (ČNS IFPI)	96
Slovakia Singles Digital (ČNS IFPI)	23
Slovenia (SloTop50)	26
Sweden (Sverigetopplistan)	100
Switzerland (Schweizer Hitparade)	92
UK Singles (Official Charts)	50
US Billboard Hot 100	66
US Adult Pop Airplay (Billboard)	33
US Dance Airplay (Billboard)	1
US Dance Club Songs (Billboard)	36
US Hot Dance/Electronic Songs (Billboard)	7
US Pop Airplay (Billboard)	13

=== Year-end charts ===
Annual chart rankings
Chart (2018)	Position
Netherlands (Dutch Top 40)	96
US Hot Dance/Electronic Songs (Billboard)	21

== Certifications ==
Certifications and sales
Region	Certification	Certified units/sales
Australia (ARIA)	Gold	35,000^{‡}
Brazil (Pro-Música Brasil)	Platinum	40,000^{‡}
Canada (Music Canada)	Platinum	80,000^{‡}
New Zealand (RMNZ)	Gold	15,000^{‡}
Poland (ZPAV)	Platinum	20,000^{‡}
United States (RIAA)	Gold	500,000^{‡}
^{‡} Sales+streaming figures based on certification alone.
