= Save Yourself (The Chainsmokers and Nghtmre song) =

Single by The Chainsmokers and Nghtmre

from the album Sick Boy
- Released: August 24, 2018
- Genre: Dubstep
- Length: 3:30
- Label: Disruptor; Columbia
- Songwriters: Andrew Taggart; Tyler Marenyi
- Producers: The Chainsmokers; Nghtmre

The Chainsmokers singles chronology
"Side Effects" (2018)	"Save Yourself" (2018)	"This Feeling" (2018)

Nghtmre singles chronology
"Grave" (2018)	"Save Yourself" (2018)	"Like That" (2018)

Music video
- "Save Yourself" on YouTube

"Save Yourself" is a song by American DJ duo The Chainsmokers and American DJ Nghtmre. The song is produced by the Chainsmokers, Nghtmre and written by Andrew Taggart and Tyler Marenyi. The song was released on August 24, 2018, by Disruptor Records and Columbia Records as the sixth single from the duo's second studio album Sick Boy.

== Background ==
In March 2018, The Chainsmokers debuted the song at the Ultra Music Festival in Miami. Nghtmre also teased and announced the song at EDC in Las Vegas, as an unreleased collaboration with The Chainsmokers. The cover art was revealed a day before the release of the official song, on August 23, 2018. The song is a hard dubstep track which contrasts heavily against the lighter dance pop music that had previously been released on the building Sick Boy album.

== Music video ==
A lyric video for the song was released on August 24, 2018, alongside the official release of the song. The official video for the song was released on September 14, 2018, cutting out its second verse and drop. The video is directed by ThatOneBlondKid, using a Halloween theme in found footage style, where Taggart appears as a vampire looking for blood and he and his friends chase a man whilst holding weapons and destroy Hollywood.

== Personnel ==
Credits adapted from Tidal.

- Alex Pall – production
- Andrew Taggart – production, composition, vocals
- Nghtmre – composition, production, engineering, mix engineering, master engineering
- Jordan Stilwell – record engineering

== Charts ==
Chart (2018)	Peak position
US Hot Dance/Electronic Songs (Billboard)	21
