= Everybody Hates Me =

Single by the Chainsmokers

from the album Sick Boy
- Released: March 16, 2018
- Length: 3:44
- Label: Disruptor; Columbia
- Composer: Andrew Taggart
- Lyricists: Emily Warren; Andrew Taggart
- Producers: The Chainsmokers; Shaun Frank

The Chainsmokers singles chronology
"You Owe Me" (2018)	"Everybody Hates Me" (2018)	"Somebody" (2018)

Music video
- "Everybody Hates Me" on YouTube

"Everybody Hates Me" is a song by American music production duo the Chainsmokers. It was produced by the Chainsmokers and Shaun Frank, with lyrics written by Emily Warren and the song's composer Andrew Taggart. It was released by Disruptor Records and Columbia Records on March 16, 2018, as the third single from the duo's second studio album, Sick Boy. Its official music video received a nomination for Best Dance at the 2018 MTV Video Music Awards.

== Background ==
The duo debuted the song during a live show in Prague on February 11, 2018. They first teased the song on March 13, 2018, along with a shot from the song's music video, which shows the duo standing in front of a car that is on fire. The song was officially announced the next day, accompanied by the cover art.

== Composition ==
According to CBS Radio's Jon Wiederhorn, "'Everybody Hates Me' is a mid-tempo, hip-hop-inflected track about being dismayed and disillusioned". Lyrically, the song discusses the situation of being self-critical and famous at the same time.

== Music video ==
The Rory Kramer-directed music video for "Everybody Hates Me" was released on April 2, 2018. It features the duo racing through a tunnel in an open-top jeep before they are shown at a house party where every other partygoer is wearing LED skull masks, with members Alex Pall and Taggart heavily drinking and sitting underwater in a pool, respectively. During the song's bridge and final drop, the duo pour gasoline on a car and set it on fire, making it explode. The video ends with Taggart, whilst still in the jeep, looking at the camera with pitch-black eyes, similar to the duo's video for "You Owe Me".

== Critical reception ==
Patrick Hosken of MTV News opined that the song sees "Drew Taggart ditches singing for a Drake-like recap of his innermost insecurities", writing that his voice "sounds closest to the prototypical emo-inspired whine on songs by the bands he grew up admiring, like Blink-182 and Panic! at the Disco". Jon Wiederhorn of CBS Radio deemed the song "yet another example of the group's catchy, beat-heavy blend of EDM and pop". Lauren O'Neill of Noisey ordered lyrics from the song "by Chainsmokers-Ness", calling it "a very Chainsmokers track". Derrick Rossignol of Uproxx regarded the song as "the type of EDM pop track we've come to expect from the Chainsmokers" and "one of the duo's more personal tracks". Andy Cush of Spin wrote: "'Everybody Hates Me' has one saving grace: a triumphant EDM drop to rival 'Roses,' delivering exactly the kind of sugar-coated synthy satisfaction they deliberately withheld on the previous whiners 'Sick Boy' and 'You Owe Me.'"

== Track listing ==
Digital download
No.	Title	Length
1.	"Everybody Hates Me"	3:44

Digital download – remixes EP
No.	Title	Length
1.	"Everybody Hates Me" (Justin Caruso remix)	3:55
2.	"Everybody Hates Me" (Steerner remix)	2:56
3.	"Everybody Hates Me" (Khrebto remix)	3:15
4.	"Everybody Hates Me" (Michael Mar remix)	3:22
5.	"Everybody Hates Me" (Linn remix)	3:02

== Credits and personnel ==
Credits adapted from Tidal.

- Andrew Taggart – production, record engineering, composition, lyrics, voice.
- Alex Pall - production, record engineering.
- Emily Warren - lyrics.
- Shaun Frank – production, mix engineering, programming.
- Chris Gehringer – master engineering.

== Charts ==
=== Weekly charts ===
Chart (2018)	Peak position
Australia (ARIA)	50
Australia Dance (ARIA)	5
Austria (Ö3 Austria Top 40)	35
Canada Hot 100 (Billboard)	71
Czech Republic Airplay (ČNS IFPI)	15
Czech Republic Singles Digital (ČNS IFPI)	15
Germany (GfK)	75
Hong Kong (Metro Radio)	3
Hungary (Stream Top 40)	13
Ireland (IRMA)	78
Italy (FIMI)	96
Japan Hot 100 (Billboard)	97
New Zealand Heatseekers (RMNZ)	4
Norway (VG-lista)	33
Poland Airplay (ZPAV)	44
Portugal (AFP)	73
Slovakia Airplay (ČNS IFPI)	51
Slovakia Singles Digital (ČNS IFPI)	21
Sweden (Sverigetopplistan)	32
Switzerland (Schweizer Hitparade)	68
UK Singles (Official Charts)	81
US Billboard Hot 100	100
US Dance Airplay (Billboard)	25
US Hot Dance/Electronic Songs (Billboard)	5
US Pop Airplay (Billboard)	33

=== Year-end charts ===
Chart (2018)	Position
US Hot Dance/Electronic Songs (Billboard)	37

== Certifications ==
Region	Certification	Certified units/sales
Brazil (Pro-Música Brasil)	Gold	20,000^{‡}
Canada (Music Canada)	Gold	40,000^{‡}
Poland (ZPAV)	Gold	10,000^{‡}
United States (RIAA)	Gold	500,000^{‡}
^{‡} Sales+streaming figures based on certification alone.

== Release history ==
Region	Date	Format	Version	Label	Ref.
Various	March 16, 2018	Digital download	Original	Disruptor; Columbia	
United States	April 3, 2018	Contemporary hit radio	Radio edit	Columbia	
United States	April 13, 2018	Digital download	Remixes EP	Disruptor; Columbia	
