= Sickboy =

Sickboy or Sick Boy may refer to:

== People ==
- Sickboy (artist), British street artist
- Sick Boy (wrestler), American retired professional wrestler
- Sickboy, Belgian breakcore artist

== Media ==
- Sick Boy (album), by the Chainsmokers, 2018
  - "Sick Boy" (song), the title song
- Sick Boy (film), a 2012 American indie horror-thriller
- Simon "Sick Boy" Williamson, a fictional character in the novel Trainspotting and its film adaptation

== See also ==
- Sick Boi, 2023 album by Ren
