= Sick Boy (album) =

Studio album by The Chainsmokers
- Released: December 14, 2018
- Recorded: Mid-2017 – 2018
- Genre: Electropop; EDM
- Length: 32:46
- Label: Disruptor; Columbia
- Producer: The Chainsmokers; Sly; Chris Lyon; Shaun Frank; Aazar; Nghtmre

The Chainsmokers chronology
Sick Boy...Beach House (2018)	Sick Boy (2018)	World War Joy...Kills You Slowly (2019)

The Chainsmokers studio album chronology
Memories...Do Not Open (2017)	Sick Boy (2018)	World War Joy (2019)

Singles from Sick Boy
- 1. "Sick Boy" Released: January 17, 2018; 2. "You Owe Me" Released: February 16, 2018; 3. "Everybody Hates Me" Released: March 16, 2018; 4. "Somebody" Released: April 20, 2018; 5. "Side Effects" Released: July 27, 2018; 6. "Save Yourself" Released: August 24, 2018; 7. "This Feeling" Released: September 18, 2018; 8. "Siren" Released: October 26, 2018; 9. "Beach House" Released: November 16, 2018; 10. "Hope" Released: December 14, 2018

Sick Boy is the second studio album by American DJ and production duo the Chainsmokers. It was released on December 14, 2018, via Disruptor and Columbia Records. The album features collaborations with French DJ Aazar and fellow American DJ Nghtmre as well as co-production from Sly, Chris Lyon, and Shaun Frank, and writing credits from frequent co-writer Emily Warren, Kate Morgan, Drew Love of They., Tony Ann, Corey Sanders, and Chelsea Jade. Sick Boy's tracklist is made up of singles gradually released throughout 2018 as an attempt to increase the songs' success.

== Background ==
The album consists of singles that were released each month in the year 2018, except May and June, with "Sick Boy", "You Owe Me", "Everybody Hates Me" and "Somebody" being released in the first four months, from January to April. These songs were collectively released on the 'Sick Boy EP' on April 20. The next three songs, "Side Effects", "Save Yourself" and "This Feeling" were released July to September and appeared collectively alongside the first four singles on the EP 'Sick Boy...This Feeling' on September 21. "Siren", "Beach House" and "Hope" were released October to December, then collected on the final album.

Songs from the album were described as "deep and introspective", while having "bangers that sound out of place". The album was noted by Your EDM as "an improvement from Memories...Do Not Open" and "a massive step in the right direction... with the Chainsmokers a little lost on their own sound."

== Critical reception ==
Professional ratings
Review scores
Source	Rating
AllMusic	3.5/5 stars
The Guardian	1/5 stars
Pitchfork	3.1/10
PopMatters	5/10 stars
The Times	1/5 stars

Upon release, Sick Boy was met with mixed reviews by the music critics.

AllMusic's Neil Z. Young positively said of the album, "Compared to their 2017 official debut, the Chainsmokers' sophomore album, Sick Boy, is more introspective, thoughtful and emotional. It's also a vast improvement on the often precious (and, frankly, boring) EDM-pop of Memories…Do Not Open." He went on to state that, "At the heart of it all, this set is dark, sometimes exciting, and a step in the right direction for the immensely popular but critically maligned duo. World-weariness and a troubled heart suit them well and managed to do some good on Sick Boy."

In sharp contrast, Laura Snapes of The Guardian gave the record a very negative review, calling it "a torrent of spew-inducing self-pity".

== Track listing ==
Adapted from iTunes and Qobuz.

No.	Title	Writer(s)	Producer(s)	Length
1.	"This Feeling" (featuring Kelsea Ballerini)	Andrew Taggart; Alex Pall; Emily Warren	The Chainsmokers	3:17
2.	"Beach House"	Taggart; Pall	The Chainsmokers	3:26
3.	"Hope" (featuring Winona Oak)	Taggart; Pall; Chris Lyon; Kate Morgan; Winona Oak	The Chainsmokers; Lyon	3:00
4.	"Somebody" (featuring Drew Love)	Taggart; Drew Love; Warren	The Chainsmokers	3:41
5.	"Side Effects" (featuring Emily Warren)	Taggart; Warren; Sylvester Willy Siversten; Tony Ann; Corey Sanders	The Chainsmokers; Sly	2:52
6.	"Sick Boy"	Taggart; Pall; Warren; Ann	The Chainsmokers; Shaun Frank	3:13
7.	"Everybody Hates Me"	Taggart; Warren	The Chainsmokers; Frank	3:43
8.	"Siren" (with Aazar)	Taggart; Pall; Alexis Duvivier	The Chainsmokers; Aazar	2:54
9.	"You Owe Me"	Taggart; Pall; Warren; Chelsea Jade	The Chainsmokers; Frank	3:10
10.	"Save Yourself" (with Nghtmre)	Taggart; Tyler Marenyi	The Chainsmokers; Nghtmre	3:30
Total length:				32:46

Special edition bonus tracks
No.	Title	Writer(s)	Producer(s)	Length
11.	"This Feeling" (featuring Kelsea Ballerini) (Afrojack & Disto Remix)	Andrew Taggart; Alex Pall; Emily Warren	The Chainsmokers; Afrojack^{[r]}; Disto^{[r]}	3:27
12.	"Somebody" (featuring Drew Love) (Riggi & Piros Remix)	Taggart; Drew Love; Warren	The Chainsmokers; Riggi & Piros^{[r]}	3:00
13.	"Side Effects" (featuring Emily Warren) (Fedde Le Grand Remix)	Taggart; Warren; Sylvester Willy Siversten; Tony Ann; Corey Sanders	The Chainsmokers; Sly; Fedde Le Grand^{[r]}	2:52
14.	"Sick Boy" (Zaxx Remix)	Taggart; Pall; Warren; Ann	The Chainsmokers; Shaun Frank; Zaxx^{[r]}	3:38
15.	"Somebody" (featuring Drew Love) (Ruhde Remix)	Taggart; Drew Love; Warren	The Chainsmokers; Ruhde^{[r]}	3:38
16.	"Everybody Hates Me" (Khrebto Remix)	Taggart; Warren	The Chainsmokers; Frank; Khrebto^{[r]}	3:15
17.	"You Owe Me" (Magnace Remix)	Taggart; Pall; Warren; Chelsea Jade	The Chainsmokers; Frank; Magnace^{[r]}	3:26
18.	"Something Just like This" (with Coldplay) (Alesso Remix)	Taggart; Chris Martin; Guy Berryman; Jonny Buckland; Will Champion	The Chainsmokers; Alesso^{[r]}	4:12
19.	"Paris" (Vinai Remix)	Taggart; Kristoffer Eriksson; Fredrik Häggstam; Charlee Nyman	The Chainsmokers; DJ Swivel^{[v]}; Vinai^{[r]}	3:38
20.	"Setting Fires" (featuring Xylø) (Sigma Remix)	Taggart; Melanie Fontana; Jon Asher	The Chainsmokers; Sigma^{[r]}	4:16
21.	"Don't Let Me Down" (featuring Daya) (W&W Remix)	Taggart; Warren; Scott Harris	The Chainsmokers; W&W^{[r]}	3:15
22.	"Roses" (featuring Rozes) (The Him Remix)	Taggart; Elizabeth Mencel	The Chainsmokers; The Him^{[r]}	2:57
23.	"Closer" (featuring Halsey) (R3hab Remix)	Taggart; Ashley Frangipane; Frank; Frederic Kennett; Isaac Slade; Joe King	The Chainsmokers; R3HAB^{[r]}	2:41
Total length:				77:01

Sick Boy EP
No.	Title	Writer(s)	Producer(s)	Length
1.	"Somebody" (featuring Drew Love)	Andrew Taggart; Drew Love; Emily Warren	The Chainsmokers	3:41
2.	"Everybody Hates Me"	Taggart; Warren	The Chainsmokers; Shaun Frank	3:43
3.	"You Owe Me"	Taggart; Alex Pall; Warren; Chelsea Jade	The Chainsmokers; Frank	3:10
4.	"Sick Boy"	Taggart; Pall; Warren; Tony Ann	The Chainsmokers; Frank	3:13
Total length:				13:47

Sick Boy...This Feeling EP
No.	Title	Writer(s)	Producer(s)	Length
1.	"This Feeling" (featuring Kelsea Ballerini)	Andrew Taggart; Alex Pall; Emily Warren	The Chainsmokers	3:17
2.	"Side Effects" (featuring Emily Warren)	Taggart; Warren; Sylvester Willy Siversten; Tony Ann; Corey Sanders	The Chainsmokers; Sly	2:52
3.	"Save Yourself" (with Nghtmre)	Taggart; Tyler Marenyi	The Chainsmokers; Nghtmre	3:30
4.	"Somebody" (featuring Drew Love)	Taggart; Drew Love; Warren	The Chainsmokers	3:41
5.	"Everybody Hates Me"	Taggart; Warren	The Chainsmokers; Shaun Frank	3:43
6.	"You Owe Me"	Taggart; Pall; Warren; Chelsea Jade	The Chainsmokers; Frank	3:10
7.	"Sick Boy"	Taggart; Pall; Warren; Ann	The Chainsmokers; Frank	3:13
Total length:				23:26

- ^{[v]} signifies a vocal producer
- ^{[r]} signifies a remix producer

== Personnel ==
Adapted from Qobuz.

- Adam Alpert – executive production
- Alex Pall – production (all), songwriting (1–3, 6, 8, 9), programming (1–5, 8–10), mixing (1, 2, 8), mastering (1, 2, 8), piano (1), executive production
- Andrew Taggart – production (all), songwriting (all), programming (1–5, 8–10), mixing (1, 2, 8), mastering (1, 2, 8), guitar (1), vocals (all)
- Aazar – production (8), songwriting (8), mixing (8), mastering (8)
- Chelsea Jade – songwriting (9)
- Chris Gerhinger – mastering (5–7, 9)
- Chris Lyon – production (3), songwriting (3)
- Corey Sanders – songwriting (5)
- Drew Love – songwriting (4), vocals (4)
- Emily Warren – songwriting (1, 4–7, 9), piano (9), vocals (5)
- Jordan Stilwell – mixing (1–5)
- Kate Morgan – songwriting (3)
- Kelsea Ballerini – vocals (1)
- Matt McGuire – drums (6, 7, 9)
- Emerson Mancini – mastering (3)
- Nghtmre – production (10), songwriting (10), mixing (10), mastering (10)
- Nicolas Petitfrère – mastering (8)
- Petra Vasuri – art direction
- Randy Merrill – mastering (4)
- Shaun Frank – production (6, 7, 9), programming (6, 7), mixing (6, 7, 9)
- Sly – production (5), songwriting (5)
- Tony Ann – songwriting (5, 6), piano (6)
- Winona Oak – vocals (3), songwriting (3)

== Charts ==
=== Weekly charts ===
==== Album ====
Chart (2018–2019)	Peak position
Australian Albums (ARIA)	72
Austrian Albums (Ö3 Austria)	41
Finnish Albums (Suomen virallinen lista)	18
German Albums (Offizielle Top 100)	65
Japan Hot Albums (Billboard Japan)	73
Japanese Albums (Oricon)	36
Latvian Albums (LAIPA)	4
Lithuanian Albums (AGATA)	2
Norwegian Albums (VG-lista)	6
South Korean Albums (Gaon)	77

==== Sick Boy (EP) ====
Chart	Peak position
Danish Albums (Hitlisten)	36
US Billboard 200	53
US Top Dance Albums (Billboard)	1

==== Sick Boy...Beach House ====
Chart	Peak position
Finnish Albums (Suomen virallinen lista)	45
Latvian Albums (LAIPA)	15
Norwegian Albums (VG-lista)	18
Swedish Albums (Sverigetopplistan)	13

==== Sick Boy...Save Yourself ====
Chart	Peak position
Finnish Albums (Suomen virallinen lista)	27
Norwegian Albums (VG-lista)	15

==== Sick Boy...Side Effects ====
Chart	Peak position
Belgian Albums (Ultratop Flanders)	57
Belgian Albums (Ultratop Wallonia)	142
Danish Albums (Hitlisten)	40
Dutch Albums (Album Top 100)	41
Swedish Albums (Sverigetopplistan)	29

==== Sick Boy...Siren ====
Chart	Peak position
Finnish Albums (Suomen virallinen lista)	45
Latvian Albums (LAIPA)	28
Norwegian Albums (VG-lista)	22

==== Sick Boy...This Feeling ====
Chart	Peak position
Australian Albums (ARIA)	87
Danish Albums (Hitlisten)	37
Finnish Albums (Suomen virallinen lista)	28
Norwegian Albums (VG-lista)	13
Swedish Albums (Sverigetopplistan)	9

=== Year-end charts ===
==== Sick Boy (EP) ====
Chart (2018)	Position
US Top Dance/Electronic Albums (Billboard)	8
Chart (2019)	Position
US Top Dance/Electronic Albums (Billboard)	3
Chart (2020)	Position
US Top Dance/Electronic Albums (Billboard)	18

==== Sick Boy...Beach House ====
Chart (2019)	Position
Swedish Albums (Sverigetopplistan)	60

==== Sick Boy...Side Effects ====
Chart (2019)	Position
Belgian Albums (Ultratop Flanders)	152

== Certifications ==
Region	Certification	Certified units/sales
Brazil (Pro-Música Brasil)	Platinum	40,000^{‡}
Canada (Music Canada)	Platinum	80,000^{‡}
Denmark (IFPI Danmark)	Gold	10,000^{‡}
New Zealand (RMNZ)	Platinum	15,000^{‡}
Poland (ZPAV)	Gold	10,000^{‡}
Singapore (RIAS)	Platinum	10,000^{*}
United Kingdom (BPI)	Silver	60,000^{‡}
United States (RIAA)	Gold	500,000^{‡}
^{*} Sales figures based on certification alone.^{‡} Sales+streaming figures based on certification alone.
