= Chelsea Jade =

South African-born New Zealand musician (born 1989)

- Born: Chelsea Jade Metcalf; 11 May 1989 (age 37); Cape Town, South Africa
- Origin: Auckland, New Zealand
- Genres: Pop; indie pop
- Occupations: Singer; songwriter
- Website: chelseajade.co

Chelsea Jade Metcalf (born 11 May 1989) is a South African-born New Zealand singer-songwriter and record producer based in Los Angeles. Vice has described her as New Zealand's "Accidental Dream Pop Hero". In 2017, she was nominated for New Zealand’s Silver Scroll Award for song of the year for her song "Life of the Party." As a songwriter, Jade has written with numerous artists including The Chainsmokers, Cxloe, Jai Wolf, and Attlas.

== Career ==
Chelsea Jade was born in Cape Town, South Africa. Her family relocated to Auckland, New Zealand when she was five years old. In high school, she formed the folk trio Teacups with schoolmates Elizabeth Stokes (The Beths) and Talita Setyady. The band opened shows for Cat Power, Kimya Dawson, and José González.

Jade’s first solo project, Watercolours, won her the New Zealand Music Award’s Critic Choice prize in 2012. In 2014, she released her second EP, Beacons, her first release as Chelsea Jade. That year she participated in the Red Bull Music Academy in Tokyo, Japan.

In 2015 she relocated to Los Angeles to pursue her own artist career as well as writing songs for others.

Jade was a recipient of a 2017 APRA professional development award, presented every two years to three New Zealand songwriters and composers who demonstrate outstanding potential in their field.

Her first full-length album Personal Best was released on 20 July 2018. It includes collaborations with New Zealand producers Leroy Clampitt (Big Taste), Sam McCarthy (BoyBoy), Justin Pilbrow, and American producer Brad Hale (of Now, Now).

She has opened for Lorde, who is a friend of hers. In August 2021, Jade appeared in Lorde's "Mood Ring" music video.

On 15 April 2020, she released the single "Superfan" and its accompanying music video.

In April 2022, her sophomore album “Soft Spot” was released via Carpark Records. Rose Matafeo featured in the video for “Best Behaviour”, the second single from Soft Spot.

Jade won the Tui award for “Best Album Artwork” in November 2022.

== Discography ==
=== Studio albums ===
Title	Album details	Peak chart positions
Title	Album details	NZ Artist
Personal Best	Released: 20 July 2018; Label: Self-released, Create Music Group; Formats: Digital download, LP	10
Soft Spot	Released: 29 April 2022; Label: Carpark Records; Formats: Digital download, LP	20

=== Extended plays ===
Title	Details
Over and Under	Released: 20 December 2012; Label: Self-released; Formats: digital download,
Portals	Released: 14 January 2014; Label: Self-released, Rallye (JPN); Formats: CD, digital download
Beacons	Released: 24 October 2014; Label: Self-released; Formats: digital download

=== Singles ===
Title	Year	Album
"Under"	2011	Portals
"Pazzida"	2012	Portals
"Soft Teeth"	2014	Portals
"Night Swimmer"	2014	Beacons
"Kyoto Train"	2015	Beacons
"Low Brow"	2015	Personal Best
"Colour Sum"	2016	Personal Best
"Life of the Party"	2017	Personal Best
"Ride or Cry"	2017	Personal Best
"High Beam"	2017	Personal Best
"Lost" (Jai Wolf & Chelsea Jade)	2018	Non-album single
"Laugh It Off"	2018	Personal Best
"Superfan"	2020	Soft Spot
"Optimist"	2022	Soft Spot
"Good Taste"	2022	Soft Spot
"Best Behaviour"	2022	Soft Spot

==== As featured artist ====
Title	Year	Album
"Diving Board" (Mayavanya featuring Chelsea Jade)	2015	Non-album single
"Holy Water" (Boycrush featuring Chelsea Jade)	2018	Desperate Late Night Energy
"Boomtown" (The Adults featuring Chelsea Jade & Raiza Biza)	2018	Haja

=== Guest appearances ===
List of non-single guest appearances with other performing artists
Title	Year	Other artist(s)	Album
"Secrets"	2012	Boycrush	Everybody All the Time
"Birds"	2013	The Veils	Time Stays, We Go
"Another Night on Earth"	2013	The Veils	Time Stays, We Go
"Lush Life"	2015	Boycrush	Girls on Top
"Parallel Lines"	2015	Attlas	Sin EP
"Reece's Pieces"	2018	Boycrush	Desperate Late Night Energy
"Shark Attack"	2021	—N/a	True Colours, New Colours: The Songs of Split Enz

== Songwriting credits ==
List of songs written or co-written for other artists, showing year released and album name
Title	Year	Artist(s)	Album
"Anti Radiation Fez"	2012	James Duncan	Vanishing
"Daylight"	Boyboy	Boyboy	
"Afraid"	Boyboy	Boyboy	2017
"Ruin"	So Below	II	2017
"Me"	Boyboy	Boyboy	2017
"Tough Love"	Cxloe	Non-album single	2017
"U"	Boyboy	Boyboy	2017
"Touch"	LaDonnis	Non-album single	2017
"Youth"	Luna Shadows	Youth EP	2017
"Cellophane"	Soren Bryce	Non-album single	2017
"Close"	So Below	II	2017
"Visions"	So Below	II	2018
"Alrite Tho"	Boyboy	Boyboy	2018
"Boy"	Boyboy	Boyboy	2018
"None of Your Love"	Boyboy	Boyboy	2018
"You Owe Me"	The Chainsmokers	Sick Boy	2018
"Aisle Seat On a Rough Flight"	Soren Bryce	Discussions with Myself	2018
"Houses with Ugly Wallpaper"	Soren Bryce	Discussions with Myself	2018
