= Inside Out (The Chainsmokers song) =

Single by The Chainsmokers featuring Charlee

from the EP Collage
- Released: April 1, 2016
- Genre: Electropop
- Length: 3:53
- Label: Disruptor; Columbia
- Songwriters: Andrew Taggart; Charlee
- Producer: The Chainsmokers

The Chainsmokers singles chronology
"Don't Let Me Down" (2016)	"Inside Out" (2016)	"Closer" (2016)

Charlee singles chronology
"Inside Out" (2016)	"When We Blow Up" (2016)

"Inside Out" is a song by American DJ duo The Chainsmokers. It features vocals from Swedish singer-songwriter Charlee Nyman and was released on April 1, 2016, through Disruptor Records and Columbia Records.

== Critical reception ==
Matt Medved of Billboard labeled it a "softer-edged song" and said it was a "welcomed shift."

== Track listing ==
Digital download
No.	Title	Length
1.	"Inside Out" (featuring Charlee)	3:53

Digital download – DubVision Remix
No.	Title	Length
1.	"Inside Out" (featuring Charlee) (DubVision Remix)	4:59

== Charts ==
=== Weekly charts ===
Chart (2016)	Peak position
Canada Hot 100 (Billboard)	72
US Hot Dance/Electronic Songs (Billboard)	13

=== Year-end charts ===
Chart (2016)	Position
US Hot Dance/Electronic Songs (Billboard)	37

== Certifications ==
Region	Certification	Certified units/sales
Australia (ARIA)	Gold	35,000^{‡}
Canada (Music Canada)	Gold	40,000^{‡}
United States (RIAA)	Gold	500,000^{‡}
^{‡} Sales+streaming figures based on certification alone.

== Release history ==
Region	Date	Format	Label	Ref.
United States	April 1, 2016	Digital download	Disruptor; Columbia	
United States	July 15, 2016	Digital download (DubVision Remix)	Disruptor; Columbia	
