= Collage (EP) =

EP by The Chainsmokers
- Released: November 4, 2016
- Recorded: 2015–2016
- Genres: Electronic; pop; EDM; future bass
- Length: 18:47
- Labels: Disruptor; Columbia
- Producer: The Chainsmokers

The Chainsmokers chronology
Bouquet (2015)	Collage (2016)	Memories...Do Not Open (2017)

Singles from Collage
- 1. "Don't Let Me Down" Released: February 5, 2016; 2. "Inside Out" Released: April 1, 2016; 3. "Closer" Released: July 29, 2016; 4. "All We Know" Released: September 29, 2016; 5. "Setting Fires" Released: November 4, 2016

Collage is the second extended play (EP) by American DJ duo The Chainsmokers. It was released on November 4, 2016, through Disruptor Records and Columbia Records.

Professional ratings
Review scores
Source	Rating
AllMusic	3.5/5 stars

== Singles ==
"Don't Let Me Down" was released as the lead single on February 5, 2016. The song features American singer Daya and peaked at number three on the US Billboard Hot 100, and became the duo's second top ten single, the first being "Roses".

"Inside Out", featuring Swedish singer Charlee Nyman, was released as the second single on April 1, 2016. Since its release, it has peaked at number 13 on the US Hot Dance/Electronic Songs chart.

"Closer", featuring singer Halsey, was released as the third single on July 29, 2016. The song entered the Billboard Hot 100 at number nine; it became the Chainsmokers' third top ten single. Two weeks later, the song peaked atop the chart. It was both the Chainsmokers' and Halsey's first number one single, topping the chart for twelve consecutive weeks, becoming the longest-running number-one single in 2016 in the US.

"All We Know", which features Phoebe Ryan, was released as the fourth single from the EP on September 29, 2016. It was dubbed by some critics as "a sequel to 'Closer'". The song peaked at number 18 on the Billboard Hot 100.

"Setting Fires" was released as a single the same day of the release of the EP. The song features the vocals of American electronic music duo XYLO. It peaked at number 71 on the Billboard Hot 100 chart.

== Critical reception ==
Collage garnered a very negative 3.5-out-of-ten review from Pitchfork writer Kevin Lozano, who described it as "essentially an accretion of trends" and "a packet of market research."

== Commercial performance ==
Collage debuted at number six on the US Billboard 200 on the chart dated November 26, 2016, with 39,000 album-equivalent units, of which 9,000 were pure album sales. As of May 22, 2026, the EP has sold 3,000,000 album-equivalent units in the United States.

== Track listing ==
Collage track listing
No.	Title	Writer(s)	Length
1.	"Setting Fires" (featuring Xylø)	Andrew Taggart; Melanie Fontana; Jon Asher	4:07
2.	"All We Know" (featuring Phoebe Ryan)	Taggart; Sara Hjellström; Nirob Islam	3:14
3.	"Closer" (featuring Halsey)	Taggart; Ashley Frangipane; Shaun Frank; Frederic Kennett; Isaac Slade; Joe King	4:04
4.	"Inside Out" (featuring Charlee)	Taggart; Charlee	3:54
5.	"Don't Let Me Down" (featuring Daya)	Taggart; Emily Warren; Scott Harris	3:28
Total length:			18:47

== Charts ==
=== Weekly charts ===
Weekly chart performance for Collage
Chart (2016)	Peak position
Australian Singles (ARIA)	23
Canadian Albums (Billboard)	2
Irish Albums (IRMA)	16
New Zealand Albums (RMNZ)	7
Scottish Albums (Official Charts)	74
South Korean Albums (Circle)	83
South Korean International Albums (Circle)	7
Taiwanese Albums (Five Music)	10
UK Albums (Official Charts)	49
US Billboard 200	6
US Top Dance Albums (Billboard)	1

=== Year-end charts ===
Year-end chart performance for Collage
Chart	Year	Position
US Top Dance/Electronic Albums (Billboard)	2016	23
Canadian Albums (Billboard)	2017	18
New Zealand Albums (RMNZ)	2017	32
US Billboard 200	2017	30
US Top Dance/Electronic Albums (Billboard)	2017	2
US Top Dance/Electronic Albums (Billboard)	2018	3
US Top Dance/Electronic Albums (Billboard)	2019	4
US Top Dance/Electronic Albums (Billboard)	2020	6
US Top Dance/Electronic Albums (Billboard)	2021	3
US Top Dance/Electronic Albums (Billboard)	2022	4
US Top Dance/Electronic Albums (Billboard)	2023	7
US Top Dance/Electronic Albums (Billboard)	2024	9
US Top Dance Albums (Billboard)	2025	11

== Certifications ==
Certifications for Collage
Region	Certification	Certified units/sales
Australia (ARIA)	Gold	35,000^{‡}
Canada (Music Canada)	4× Platinum	320,000^{‡}
Mexico (AMPROFON) Collage Ep + New York City	3× Platinum	180,000^{‡}
New Zealand (RMNZ)	4× Platinum	60,000^{‡}
United Kingdom (BPI)	Silver	60,000^{‡}
United States (RIAA)	3× Platinum	3,000,000^{‡}
^{‡} Sales+streaming figures based on certification alone.
