= Beach House (The Chainsmokers song) =

2018 song by The Chainsmokers

Single by The Chainsmokers

from the album Sick Boy
- Released: November 16, 2018
- Genre: Future bass
- Length: 3:26
- Label: Disruptor; Columbia
- Songwriters: Drew Taggart; Alex Pall
- Producer: The Chainsmokers

The Chainsmokers singles chronology
"Siren" (2018)	"Beach House" (2018)	"Hope" (2018)

Music video
- Video on YouTube

"Beach House" is a song by the Chainsmokers. It was released as a single on November 16, 2018, via Disruptor Records and Columbia Records. It is included on their second studio album, Sick Boy. It is also notably the only song on the album to not feature any other musicians in the song credits.

== Background ==
Jillian Mapes of Pitchfork wrote that "though the accompanying lyric video doesn’t even capitalize Beach House...They are talking about the Baltimore duo that, for the last decade or so, has redefined the concept of 'vibey' music by honing a specific sound and not striving for mass appeal." She said "music for space travel, but it's also the kind of thing that's playing when you're passing a joint and one of your friends asks what chakras even are".

The Chainsmokers stated about the song on Twitter that they "really love this song as well cause we tried to get back to our roots on this with that classic OG Chainsmoker feel. And we were listening to a lot of beach house", noting the song was inspired by the indie rock duo Beach House.

== Lyric video ==
"Beach House"'s lyric video, directed and edited by Jeremiah Davis and produced by That One Blond Kid Corp, (Note: Credits adapted from the video's description on YouTube.) was released to YouTube on November 16, 2018. It features the Chainsmokers member Drew Taggart singing the song intercut with footage of different women.

== Critical reception ==
Spin described the song's meaning as "feeling horny and needy that sounds sort of unfinished," noting the "big synth line, a trip to Japan, possible recreational drugs, and muted acoustic guitar chords standing in for emotion." Kat Bein of Billboard stated that the song is "a love song, not about any one girl in particular, but a certain type of girl that keeps singer Drew Taggart from feeling too lonely on the road." She also said it consists of a "simple synth hook and pop song-structure that's worked so well in the past." Dancing Astronaut called the song a "reminiscent of the pop-dance fusion releases that ascended Pall and Taggart into rampant stardom with Memories...Do Not Open".

== Charts ==
=== Weekly charts ===
Chart (2018–19)	Peak position
Australia (ARIA)	89
Austria (Ö3 Austria Top 40)	46
Czech Republic Airplay (ČNS IFPI)	53
Czech Republic Singles Digital (ČNS IFPI)	44
Germany (GfK)	92
Greece International Digital Singles (IFPI)	83
Hungary (Stream Top 40)	35
Ireland (IRMA)	74
New Zealand Hot Singles (RMNZ)	2
Slovakia Singles Digital (ČNS IFPI)	54
Sweden (Sverigetopplistan)	56
Switzerland (Schweizer Hitparade)	93
US Hot Dance/Electronic Songs (Billboard)	10

=== Year-end charts ===
Chart (2019)	Position
US Hot Dance/Electronic Songs (Billboard)	50

== Certifications ==
Region	Certification	Certified units/sales
Brazil (Pro-Música Brasil)	Gold	20,000^{‡}
^{‡} Sales+streaming figures based on certification alone.
