= Hope (The Chainsmokers song) =

Single by The Chainsmokers featuring Winona Oak

from the album Sick Boy
- Released: December 14, 2018
- Genre: Tropical house; EDM
- Length: 3:01
- Label: Disruptor; Columbia
- Songwriters: Andrew Taggart; Alex Pall; Chris Lyon; Kate Morgan
- Producers: The Chainsmokers; Chris Lyon

The Chainsmokers singles chronology
"Beach House" (2018)	"Hope" (2018)	"Who Do You Love" (2019)

Winona Oak singles chronology
"Beautiful" (2018)	"Hope" (2018)	"He Don't Love Me" (2019)

Music video
- "Hope" on YouTube

"Hope" is a song by American DJ and production duo The Chainsmokers. Released on December 14, 2018, via Disruptor Records and Columbia Records, it features Swedish singer Winona Oak.

== Background ==
Dancing Astronaut described the song as having "rhythm and light synth patterns that create a tropical house feel, adding a soothing background for its verses of combined vocal contributions." "Hope" was released as the final single from the Chainsmokers' second studio album Sick Boy. The song was described as being about "the desire of someone to be loved".

== Music video ==
The lyric video of the song was released on December 14, 2018. It features the Chainsmokers and Winona Oak "laying on the floor covered in colorful flashing lights". Oak, being "the main focus of the video", appears wearing a "tan trench coat and red flannel shirt".

== Personnel ==
Adapted from the album liner notes, Spotify, and Tidal

- Andrew Taggart – songwriting, vocals
- Alex Pall – songwriting, production
- Chris Lyon – songwriting, production
- Kate Morgan – songwriting
- Emerson Mancini – mastering
- Jordan Stilwell – mixing, recording
- Winona Oak – vocals, songwriting

== Charts ==
=== Weekly charts ===
Chart (2018–2019)	Peak position
Australia (ARIA)	36
Austria (Ö3 Austria Top 40)	56
Belgium (Ultratip Bubbling Under Flanders)	8
Belgium (Ultratip Bubbling Under Wallonia)	30
Canada Hot 100 (Billboard)	64
Czech Republic Singles Digital (ČNS IFPI)	20
Hungary (Stream Top 40)	10
Ireland (IRMA)	20
Malaysia (RIM)	19
Netherlands (Single Top 100)	70
New Zealand (Recorded Music NZ)	27
Norway (VG-lista)	40
Portugal (AFP)	48
Romania (Airplay 100)	5
Romania Airplay (Media Forest)	2
Singapore (RIAS)	13
Slovakia Airplay (ČNS IFPI)	32
Slovakia Singles Digital (ČNS IFPI)	9
Sweden (Sverigetopplistan)	63
Switzerland (Schweizer Hitparade)	71
UK Singles (Official Charts)	89
US Bubbling Under Hot 100 (Billboard)	24
US Dance Airplay (Billboard)	30
US Hot Dance/Electronic Songs (Billboard)	7

=== Year-end charts ===
Chart (2019)	Position
US Hot Dance/Electronic Songs (Billboard)	23

== Certifications ==
Region	Certification	Certified units/sales
Australia (ARIA)	Gold	35,000^{‡}
Brazil (Pro-Música Brasil)	Platinum	40,000^{‡}
Canada (Music Canada)	Platinum	80,000^{‡}
New Zealand (RMNZ)	Platinum	30,000^{‡}
Poland (ZPAV)	Gold	25,000^{‡}
United States (RIAA)	Gold	500,000^{‡}
^{‡} Sales+streaming figures based on certification alone.
