= Who Do You Love (The Chainsmokers song) =

Single by the Chainsmokers featuring 5 Seconds of Summer

from the album World War Joy and the soundtrack of Booksmart
- Released: February 7, 2019
- Length: 3:46
- Label: Disruptor; Columbia
- Songwriters: Andrew Taggart; Alex Pall; Ashton Irwin; Calum Hood; Luke Hemmings; Michael Clifford; Talay Riley; Warren Felder; Trevor Brown; Sean Douglas; William Simmons
- Producers: The Chainsmokers; Warren "Oak" Felder

The Chainsmokers singles chronology
"Hope" (2018)	"Who Do You Love" (2019)	"Kills You Slowly" (2019)

5 Seconds of Summer singles chronology
"Lie to Me" (2018)	"Who Do You Love" (2019)	"Easier" (2019)

Music video
- "Who Do You Love" on YouTube

"Who Do You Love" is a song by American DJ duo the Chainsmokers featuring Australian pop rock band 5 Seconds of Summer, released on February 7, 2019, through Sony Music. It is the acts' first collaboration and follows their December 2018 singles "Hope" and "Lie to Me", respectively. The song serves as the lead single from the Chainsmokers' third studio album World War Joy, alongside the scene of "Booksmart". The music video was released on March 25, 2019. In April 2021, an early demo of the song intended for Demi Lovato's 2017 album Tell Me You Love Me surfaced online.

== Promotion ==
Both the Chainsmokers and 5 Seconds of Summer posted clips on social media leading up to the announcement, with 5 Seconds of Summer appearing walking through a "psychedelic landscape" and the Chainsmokers sitting in a studio talking about their lack of inspiration. An audio clip was posted on February 5, featuring what edm.com called a "radio-friendly vocal harmony" by 5 Seconds of Summer.

== Music video ==
The music video was released on March 25, 2019. In the music video, the Chainsmokers perform in a Battle of the Bands against 5 Seconds of Summer. They play in comparison to see which band is the best. The two bands start performing in a concert. In the bridge, 5 Seconds of Summer frontman Luke Hemmings crowd surfs, before the Chainsmokers member Andrew Taggart does the same, jumping from the stage roof. In the end, the stage explodes because of the tension between both bands.

== Alternative versions ==
On March 22, 2019, The Chainsmokers released a remix of the song, entitled "Who Do You Love (R3HAB Remix)".

== Charts ==
=== Weekly charts ===
Chart (2019)	Peak position
Australia (ARIA)	13
Australia Dance (ARIA)	1
Australia Digital Song Sales (Billboard)	8
Austria (Ö3 Austria Top 40)	31
Belgium (Ultratop 50 Flanders)	21
Belgium (Ultratip Bubbling Under Wallonia)	3
Canada Hot 100 (Billboard)	31
Canada All Format (Billboard)	21
Canada Digital Song Sales (Billboard)	20
China Airplay/FL (Billboard)	19
Czech Republic Airplay (ČNS IFPI)	8
Czech Republic Singles Digital (ČNS IFPI)	17
Germany (GfK)	55
Hungary (Stream Top 40)	8
Ireland (IRMA)	19
Israel (Media Forest TV Airplay)	3
Japan Hot 100 (Billboard)	69
Latvia (LAIPA)	25
Lebanon (The Official Lebanese Top 20)	9
Lithuania (AGATA)	15
Malaysia (RIM)	14
Mexico Airplay (Billboard)	25
Mexico Ingles Airplay (Billboard)	7
Netherlands (Dutch Top 40)	16
Netherlands (Single Top 100)	52
New Zealand (Recorded Music NZ)	26
Norway (VG-lista)	30
Portugal (AFP)	67
Scotland Singles (Official Charts)	32
Singapore (RIAS)	12
Slovakia Singles Digital (ČNS IFPI)	18
Slovenia (SloTop50)	48
Sweden (Sverigetopplistan)	19
Switzerland (Schweizer Hitparade)	43
UK Singles (Official Charts)	34
US Billboard Hot 100	52
US Dance Airplay (Billboard)	19
US Hot Dance/Electronic Songs (Billboard)	4
US Pop Airplay (Billboard)	10

=== Year-end charts ===
Chart (2019)	Position
Australia (ARIA)	65
Belgium (Ultratop Flanders)	69
Canada (Canadian Hot 100)	74
US Hot Dance/Electronic Songs (Billboard)	7
US Mainstream Top 40 (Billboard)	38

== Certifications ==
Certifications for "Who Do You Love"
Region	Certification	Certified units/sales
Australia (ARIA)	2× Platinum	140,000^{‡}
Brazil (Pro-Música Brasil)	3× Platinum	120,000^{‡}
Canada (Music Canada)	2× Platinum	160,000^{‡}
Denmark (IFPI Danmark)	Gold	45,000^{‡}
Mexico (AMPROFON)	Gold	30,000^{‡}
New Zealand (RMNZ)	Platinum	30,000^{‡}
Poland (ZPAV)	Gold	10,000^{‡}
United Kingdom (BPI)	Gold	400,000^{‡}
United States (RIAA)	2× Platinum	2,000,000^{‡}
^{‡} Sales+streaming figures based on certification alone.

== Release history ==
Release dates and formats for "Who Do You Love"
Region	Date	Format(s)	Label(s)	Ref.
United States	February 12, 2019	Contemporary hit radio	Disruptor; Columbia	
