= Dava (musician) =

American singer

- Born: Oklahoma, US
- Genres: Pop; R&B
- Occupations: Singer; musician; songwriter
- Instrument: Vocal
- Years active: 2020-present
- Label: Disruptor Records

Dava is an American musician, pop singer, and songwriter who made her debut on Disruptor Records with a single "ASOS".

== Early life ==
Dava grew up in Oklahoma She was raised by her grandmother for the most of her life after her mother and father died. After high school, at 18, she moved to Colorado where she immersed herself in the live music scene. finally, she settled in Los Angeles.

== Career ==
In 2020, she released her debut music video, "ASOS", which was also her first track with Disruptor Records. In February 2021, she released a new track, "New Ceilings", co-written by Mike Adubato, following the release of singles like as "Right Time" and "Papercut". Her second release in 2021 was a track, "Sticky", co-written by Kyle Buckley, Kyle Scherrer, and Max Levin.

== Musical style ==
As a musician, her compositions combine elements of Neo-soul, alternative, indie, and traditional R&B.

== Albums and extended plays ==
Title	Album details
ASOS	Released on July 17, 2020; Label: Disruptor Records, U.S; Written by herself
Right Time	Released in August 2020; Written by herself
Papercut	Released on September 17, 2020; Written by herself
New Ceilings	Released on February 26, 2021; Co-written by Mike Adubato
Sticky	Released on July 16, 2021; Co-written by Kyle Buckley, Kyle Scherrer, and Max Levin
