= Somebody (The Chainsmokers song) =

Single by the Chainsmokers featuring Drew Love

from the album Sick Boy
- Released: April 20, 2018
- Length: 3:43
- Label: Disruptor; Columbia
- Songwriters: Andrew Taggart; Drew Love; Emily Warren
- Producer: The Chainsmokers

The Chainsmokers singles chronology
"Everybody Hates Me" (2018)	"Somebody" (2018)	"Side Effects" (2018)

Drew Love singles chronology
"Closure" (2018)	"Somebody" (2018)

Music video
- "Somebody" on YouTube

"Somebody" is a song by American music production duo the Chainsmokers, featuring guest vocals from Drew Love of American R&B duo THEY. Written by Andrew Taggart, Emily Warren, Drew Love and produced by the Chainsmokers, it was released by Disruptor Records and Columbia Records on April 20, 2018, as the fourth single from the Chainsmokers' second studio album, Sick Boy.

== Release and composition ==
The Chainsmokers revealed the single artwork and announced its release date on April 18, 2018. "Somebody" is a tropical number that combines elements of pop, R&B and EDM. Featuring "mournful keys and atmospheric synths", the song consists of a "bass-heavy drop". Billboard's Kat Bein called it "a slow-cooker coated with R&B tones and twinkling accents reminiscent of earlier works by the Chainsmokers". Lyrically, the song "talks about the struggle and importance of staying true to yourself whilst everyone else around you is focused on surrounding themselves with material objects".

== Music video ==
The accompanying music video was directed by Jim Batt and Kim Boekbinder, and it features time-lapsed water color paintings from Molly Crabapple. The Chainsmokers said of the video on Twitter: "It tells the story of temptation which we all deal with in our ways but often consumes us."

== Critical reception ==
Mike Nied of Idolator regarded the song as "the pair's strongest release in 2018 and boasts one of their most restrained productions to date". He noticed the song of being more introspective compared to the duo's previous work, writing that "[Taggart's] voice effortlessly compliments their featured vocalist". Chantilly Post of HotNewHipHop opined that the song "shows [the Chainsmokers'] talent for creating chilled out, introspective tunes".

== Credits and personnel ==
Credits adapted from Tidal.

- Alex Pall – production, composition, piano
- Andrew Taggart - production, composition, guitar, vocals
- Jordan Stilwell – mix engineering, record engineering
- Randy Merrill – master engineering

== Charts ==
=== Weekly charts ===
Chart (2018)	Peak position
Australia (ARIA)	43
Austria (Ö3 Austria Top 40)	34
Canada Hot 100 (Billboard)	74
Czech Republic Singles Digital (ČNS IFPI)	31
Germany (GfK)	71
Hungary (Stream Top 40)	40
Ireland (IRMA)	100
Malaysia (RIM)	16
New Zealand Heatseekers (RMNZ)	6
Portugal (AFP)	65
Singapore (RIAS)	13
Slovakia Singles Digital (ČNS IFPI)	58
Sweden (Sverigetopplistan)	67
Switzerland (Schweizer Hitparade)	91
UK Singles (OCC)	87
US Bubbling Under Hot 100 (Billboard)	5
US Hot Dance/Electronic Songs (Billboard)	8

=== Year-end charts ===
Chart (2018)	Position
US Hot Dance/Electronic Songs (Billboard)	27

== Certifications ==
Region	Certification	Certified units/sales
Australia (ARIA)	Gold	35,000^{‡}
Brazil (Pro-Música Brasil)	Platinum	40,000^{‡}
Canada (Music Canada)	Platinum	80,000^{‡}
New Zealand (RMNZ)	Gold	15,000^{‡}
United States (RIAA)	Gold	500,000^{‡}
^{‡} Sales+streaming figures based on certification alone.
