= You Owe Me (The Chainsmokers song) =

Song by the Chainsmokers

Single by the Chainsmokers

from the album Sick Boy
- Released: February 16, 2018
- Length: 3:10
- Label: Disruptor; Columbia
- Composers: Alex Pall; Andrew Taggart
- Lyricists: Emily Warren; Andrew Taggart; Chelsea Jade; Alex Pall
- Producers: The Chainsmokers; Shaun Frank

The Chainsmokers singles chronology
"Sick Boy" (2018)	"You Owe Me" (2018)	"Everybody Hates Me" (2018)

Music video
- "You Owe Me" on YouTube

"You Owe Me" is a song recorded by American music production duo the Chainsmokers. It was composed by Alex Pall and Andrew Taggart, with lyrics written by Pall, Taggart, Emily Warren, Chelsea Jade and production handled by Shaun Frank and the duo. The song was released through Disruptor Records and Columbia Records on February 16, 2018, as the second single from the duo's second studio album, Sick Boy.

== Background ==
On February 14, 2018, the Chainsmokers revealed the single's release date and artwork on social media. The artwork features a heart-shaped steak on a plate, surrounded by red vegetables. They posted an audio preview the day after. The song was compared to Twenty One Pilots' change of sound, with the duo having switched their electronic dance music style for "palm-muted, pop-punk guitars and an occasional synth line" and a "radio-friendly" alternative rock sound.

== Production ==
Production of the song was described as consisting of "soft horn" and a repetitive guitar chord. The song is described as a "dark and brutal portrayal of depression and the media's influence on their recent lives."

== Music video ==
The music video, directed by Rory Kramer, features the Chainsmokers as vampires who eat their guests after meticulously cleaning their mansion.

== Track listing ==
Digital download
No.	Title	Length
1.	"You Owe Me"	3:10

Digital download – remixes EP
No.	Title	Length
1.	"You Owe Me" (Whyel remix)	4:16
2.	"You Owe Me" (Nonsens remix)	3:40
3.	"You Owe Me" (Subfer remix)	3:56
4.	"You Owe Me" (Inverness remix)	3:04
5.	"You Owe Me" (Magnace remix)	3:27

== Credits and personnel ==
Credits adapted from Tidal.

- The Chainsmokers – production, record engineering
- Emily Warren – piano
- Shaun Frank – production, mix engineering
- Chris Gehringer – master engineering

== Charts ==
Chart (2018)	Peak position
Australia (ARIA)	73
Austria (Ö3 Austria Top 40)	58
Canada Hot 100 (Billboard)	74
Czech Republic Singles Digital (ČNS IFPI)	28
Hungary (Stream Top 40)	24
Ireland (IRMA)	81
Netherlands (Single Top 100)	83
New Zealand Heatseekers (RMNZ)	1
Portugal (AFP)	85
Slovakia Singles Digital (ČNS IFPI)	39
Sweden (Sverigetopplistan)	55
Switzerland (Schweizer Hitparade)	93
UK Singles (OCC)	97
US Bubbling Under Hot 100 (Billboard)	4

== Certifications ==
Region	Certification	Certified units/sales
Brazil (Pro-Música Brasil)	Gold	20,000^{‡}
Canada (Music Canada)	Gold	40,000^{‡}
^{‡} Sales+streaming figures based on certification alone.

== Release history ==
Region	Date	Format	Version	Label	Ref.
Various	February 16, 2018	Digital download	Original	Disruptor; Columbia	
Australia	February 16, 2018	Contemporary hit radio	Original	Sony	
United States	March 9, 2018	Digital download	Remixes EP	Disruptor; Columbia	
