= Sick Boy (song) =

Single by The Chainsmokers

from the album Sick Boy
- Released: January 17, 2018
- Genre: Pop
- Length: 3:13
- Label: Disruptor; Columbia
- Songwriters: Andrew Taggart; Tony Ann; Alex Pall; Emily Warren
- Producers: The Chainsmokers; Shaun Frank

The Chainsmokers singles chronology
"Honest" (2017)	"Sick Boy" (2018)	"You Owe Me" (2018)

Music video
- "Sick Boy" on YouTube

"Sick Boy" is a song by American electronic music duo the Chainsmokers. It was written by the Chainsmokers, Tony Ann and Emily Warren, with production handled by the Chainsmokers and Shaun Frank. The song was released by Disruptor Records and Columbia Records on January 17, 2018, as the lead single from the duo's second studio album of the same name.

== Release ==
On the first day of 2018, the Chainsmokers teased new material by revealing their new logo on social media. They captioned the post: "How many likes is my life worth?" On January 16, 2018, the song was promoted on a Spotify-branded billboard in Times Square, which reads: "How many likes is my life worth?" "Sick Boy" was described as "a song about self-identity in today's world and standing tall in the face of what you can and can't control" in press materials.

== Music video ==
The accompanying music video, directed by Brewer, features both members of the Chainsmokers and Matt McGuire performing the song on an empty soundstage. Throughout the video, their internals are exposed by stage lights.

== Critical reception ==
"Sick Boy" received mixed reviews from critics. Kat Bein of Billboard opined that the song "sounds like a big departure from the New York City duo's usual romantic pop flair". Dave Holmes of Esquire called it the duo's version of Michael Jackson's "Man in the Mirror" with a twist. He continued: "It is the sound of two men coming to terms with having worked at a Hollister for a summer in college. It is the worst of EDM, with all of the fun surgically removed. It is, for me, a baw-eest." Mike Watkins of The Michigan Daily praised the song, calling it "another diatribe against society" with "scathingly sarcastic criticism" expressed throughout the song. He wrote that "the song's chorus is big and somewhat catchy" and expect it to be a radio hit. Matthew Schnipper of Pitchfork described the song as "a turn toward the meaningful" for the duo. "In practice, though, the song comes off more like a parody than a parable," he wrote.

Madeline Roth of MTV News regarded the song as "a catchy but gloomy slice of pure pop that sounds more like Twenty One Pilots than anything on their 2017 debut album, Memories...Do Not Open". She felt the duo has "abandoned the romantic, wistful flair" of previous songs and instead took "a decidedly darker" approach, writing that the song is "basically the opposite of '#Selfie'". Hugh McIntyre of Fuse noted that the song is "pure pop", unlike songs from their beginnings which made them popular. He furthered: "The Chainsmokers are now unabashedly trafficking in the laptop-made pop that most stars churn out, which they've been heading towards for some time." Comparing to party tracks like "Don't Let Me Down", he noticed the song of being "darker in tone", describing it as "downright gloomy", which strays away from their "wistful and melancholy" style. Similarly, Tom Skinner of NME found the song unexpectedly dark. Derrick Rossignol of Uproxx wrote: "Musically, it strays further away from their EDM roots and more towards the successful pop sound they've developed for themselves, albeit with a more aggressive edge this time around."

== Track listing ==
Digital download
No.	Title	Length
1.	"Sick Boy"	3:14

Digital download – remixes EP
No.	Title	Length
1.	"Sick Boy" (Zaxx remix)	3:39
2.	"Sick Boy" (Prismo remix)	3:44
3.	"Sick Boy" (Owen Norton remix)	3:14
4.	"Sick Boy" (Kuur remix)	3:27
5.	"Sick Boy" (Trobi remix)	2:49
6.	"Sick Boy" (neutral. remix)	2:55
7.	"Sick Boy" (ONEDUO remix)	3:27

== Credits and personnel ==
Credits adapted from Tidal.

- Andrew Taggart - production, record engineering, composition, voice.
- Alex Pall – production, record engineering, composition.
- Tony Ann – piano, composition.
- Shaun Frank – production, mix engineering, programming
- Chris Gehringer – master engineering

== Charts ==
=== Weekly charts ===
Chart (2018)	Peak position
Australia (ARIA)	37
Australia Dance (ARIA)	5
Austria (Ö3 Austria Top 40)	4
Belgium (Ultratop 50 Flanders)	30
Belgium (Ultratop 50 Wallonia)	32
Canada (Canadian Hot 100)	29
Czech Republic (Rádio – Top 100)	5
Czech Republic (Singles Digitál Top 100)	1
Denmark (Tracklisten)	13
Finland (Suomen virallinen lista)	5
France (SNEP)	121
Germany (GfK)	5
Germany Dance (Official German Charts)	1
Hungary (Single Top 40)	39
Hungary (Stream Top 40)	2
Ireland (IRMA)	17
Italy (FIMI)	61
Lebanon (Lebanese Top 20)	13
Malaysia (RIM)	18
Mexico Airplay (Billboard)	31
Netherlands (Dutch Top 40)	28
Netherlands (Single Top 100)	17
New Zealand (Recorded Music NZ)	25
Norway (VG-lista)	3
Portugal (AFP)	26
Scotland Singles (OCC)	65
Slovakia (Rádio Top 100)	21
Slovakia (Singles Digitál Top 100)	4
Spain (PROMUSICAE)	88
Sweden (Sverigetopplistan)	8
Switzerland (Schweizer Hitparade)	32
UK Singles (OCC)	35
US Billboard Hot 100	65
Venezuela (National-Report)	84

=== Year-end charts ===
Chart (2018)	Position
Austria (Ö3 Austria Top 40)	37
Denmark (Tracklisten)	61
Germany (Official German Charts)	31
Portugal (AFP)	128
Sweden (Sverigetopplistan)	82

== Certifications ==
Region	Certification	Certified units/sales
Australia (ARIA)	Platinum	70,000^{‡}
Austria (IFPI Austria)	Gold	15,000^{‡}
Belgium (BRMA)	Gold	10,000^{‡}
Brazil (Pro-Música Brasil)	2× Platinum	80,000^{‡}
Canada (Music Canada)	Platinum	80,000^{‡}
Denmark (IFPI Danmark)	Platinum	90,000^{‡}
Germany (BVMI)	Platinum	400,000^{‡}
Italy (FIMI)	Gold	25,000^{‡}
Mexico (AMPROFON)	Gold	30,000^{‡}
New Zealand (RMNZ)	Platinum	30,000^{‡}
Poland (ZPAV)	Platinum	20,000^{‡}
Switzerland (IFPI Switzerland)	Gold	10,000^{‡}
United Kingdom (BPI)	Silver	200,000^{‡}
United States (RIAA)	Platinum	1,000,000^{‡}
^{‡} Sales+streaming figures based on certification alone.

== Release history ==
Region	Date	Format	Version	Label	Ref.
Various	January 17, 2018	Digital download	Original	Disruptor; Columbia	
Italy	January 18, 2018	Contemporary hit radio	Original	Sony	
United States	January 23, 2018	Contemporary hit radio	Original	Columbia	
United States	February 9, 2018	Digital download	Remixes	Disruptor; Columbia	
