= All We Know =

Single by The Chainsmokers featuring Phoebe Ryan

from the EP Collage
- Released: September 29, 2016
- Genre: Electropop; future bass
- Length: 3:14
- Label: Disruptor; Columbia
- Songwriters: Andrew Taggart; Sara Hjellström; Nirob Islam
- Producer: The Chainsmokers

The Chainsmokers singles chronology
| "Closer" (2016) | "All We Know" (2016) | "Setting Fires" (2016) |

Phoebe Ryan singles chronology
| "Dollar Bill" (2016) | "All We Know" (2016) | "Dark Side" (2017) |

Music video
- "All We Know" on YouTube

"All We Know" is a song by American DJ duo The Chainsmokers. It features vocals from Andrew Taggart (one half of The Chainsmokers) and American singer Phoebe Ryan. The song was released on September 29, 2016, through Disruptor Records and Columbia Records.

== Background and composition ==
On the song, The Chainsmokers said "It's about the hardships of relationships but never giving up on your ride or die."

The song is written in the key of C major with a common time tempo of 90 beats per minute with a chord progression of C – Fsus2 – Am. The vocals span from G_{3} to A_{4} in the song. The lyrics were written by Taggart and Swedish songwriting duo SHY—made up of Sara Hjellström and Nirob Islam (better known as Shy Martin and Shy Nodi, respectively)—while the production was handled by The Chainsmokers.

== Critical reception ==
Isis Briones of Teen Vogue stated "When you look beyond the catchy beats, the song explores a situation arguably worse than wanting to get back together with your ex: The idea of a fading relationship. The DJs open up a door of emotions many can relate to. As tragic as the initial lines may be, the rest of the song pulls through with the most heartfelt happy ever after you'll hear." Idolator's Mike Wass said "[All We Know] picks up where 'Closer' left off" and went on to say "it's almost as if The Chainsmokers took 'Closer' and refined it. That might be a little safe, but it's also very smart." Deepa Lakshmin of MTV labeled it a "bittersweet tune about a relationship that's not quite going anywhere" and said it is "basically a sequel to 'Closer'."

== Music video ==
The music video for the song directed by Rory Kramer was released to YouTube on November 17, 2016. The video begins with a man (portrayed by Casey Deidrick) fleeing out from his girlfriend's (Jocelin Albor) house after receiving a desperate phone call, seemingly with bad news about his father. He buys a bottle of liquor in a store and then smashes the bottle, his phone, and a trash can cover. Feeling drawn out, he hitchhikes a car as the sun was about to rise. The video ends with his footage of walking on a mountain trail as cutbacks of his prior events last night were played in rewind, culminating in meeting his girlfriend back at the mountain peak.

The video's shooting method is found footage, in which a camera is strapped to Casey's waist to record the music video. It includes cameos of The Chainsmokers as convenience store customers and Phoebe Ryan as a cashier.

== Track listing ==
Digital download – Oliver Heldens Remix
| No. | Title | Length |
|---|---|---|
| 1. | "All We Know" (Oliver Heldens Remix) (featuring Phoebe Ryan) | 3:04 |

== Charts ==
=== Weekly charts ===
| Chart (2016–2017) | Peak position |
|---|---|
| Australia (ARIA) | 8 |
| Austria (Ö3 Austria Top 40) | 15 |
| Belgium (Ultratop 50 Flanders) | 43 |
| Belgium (Ultratip Bubbling Under Wallonia) | 5 |
| Canada Hot 100 (Billboard) | 14 |
| Czech Republic Airplay (ČNS IFPI) | 18 |
| Czech Republic Singles Digital (ČNS IFPI) | 9 |
| Denmark (Tracklisten) | 35 |
| France (SNEP) | 186 |
| Germany (GfK) | 40 |
| Hungary (Single Top 40) | 40 |
| Ireland (IRMA) | 18 |
| Italy (FIMI) | 30 |
| Lebanon (Lebanese Top 20) | 13 |
| Netherlands (Dutch Top 40) | 15 |
| Netherlands (Single Top 100) | 21 |
| New Zealand (Recorded Music NZ) | 10 |
| Norway (VG-lista) | 10 |
| Portugal (AFP) | 27 |
| Scotland Singles (Official Charts) | 11 |
| Slovakia Airplay (ČNS IFPI) | 73 |
| Slovakia Singles Digital (ČNS IFPI) | 13 |
| Sweden (Sverigetopplistan) | 19 |
| Switzerland (Schweizer Hitparade) | 32 |
| UK Singles (Official Charts) | 24 |
| US Billboard Hot 100 | 18 |
| US Dance Airplay (Billboard) | 22 |

=== Year-end charts ===
| Chart (2016) | Position |
|---|---|
| Australia (ARIA) | 89 |
| Netherlands (Dutch Top 40) | 95 |

== Certifications ==
| Region | Certification | Certified units/sales |
|---|---|---|
| Australia (ARIA) | 3× Platinum | 210,000^{‡} |
| Brazil (Pro-Música Brasil) | 2× Platinum | 120,000^{‡} |
| Canada (Music Canada) | 2× Platinum | 160,000^{‡} |
| Denmark (IFPI Danmark) | Gold | 45,000^{‡} |
| France (SNEP) | Gold | 66,666^{‡} |
| Italy (FIMI) | Platinum | 50,000^{‡} |
| Mexico (AMPROFON) | Platinum+Gold | 90,000^{‡} |
| New Zealand (RMNZ) | Platinum | 30,000^{‡} |
| Sweden (GLF) | 2× Platinum | 80,000^{‡} |
| Switzerland (IFPI Switzerland) | Gold | 15,000^{‡} |
| United Kingdom (BPI) | Gold | 400,000^{‡} |
| United States (RIAA) | Platinum | 1,000,000^{‡} |
^{‡} Sales+streaming figures based on certification alone.
