= Closer (The Chainsmokers song) =

2016 single by the Chainsmokers featuring Halsey

Single by the Chainsmokers featuring Halsey

from the EP Collage and the album Memories...Do Not Open [Japanese Edition]
- Released: July 29, 2016
- Genre: Future bass; electropop
- Length: 4:04
- Label: Disruptor; Columbia
- Songwriters: Andrew Taggart; Ashley Frangipane; Shaun Frank; Frederic Kennett; Isaac Slade; Joe King
- Producer: The Chainsmokers

The Chainsmokers singles chronology
"Inside Out" (2016)	"Closer" (2016)	"All We Know" (2016)

Halsey singles chronology
"Hands" (2016)	"Closer" (2016)	"Not Afraid Anymore" (2017)

Music video
- "Closer" on YouTube

"Closer" is a song by American DJ duo the Chainsmokers featuring American singer Halsey. Halsey duets with Chainsmokers member Andrew Taggart, who had never provided lead vocals on a song before (although he provided background vocals for "Roses"). It was released on July 29, 2016 through Disruptor Records and Columbia Records. The song was written by Taggart, Halsey, Shaun Frank, Freddy Kennett, Isaac Slade and Joe King. Halsey's vocals were produced by DJ Swivel, while the main song production was handled by the Chainsmokers. Musically, it is a future bass and electropop song with a "retro" style synthesizer in the chorus. Taggart and Halsey take turns singing their parts before singing the chorus together as the song concludes. The song is also included on the Japanese edition of The Chainsmokers' debut studio album, Memories...Do Not Open (2017).

In the United States, "Closer" became both the Chainsmokers' and Halsey's first number-one single on the Billboard Hot 100. The song stayed at the top spot for 12 consecutive weeks; it was the highest-charting EDM song to crack the Billboard Decade-End in the 2010s according to Billboard. The Chainsmokers became the first act to have four songs ("Closer" being the fourth) top the Dance/Electronic Songs chart, passing Calvin Harris, who held the previous record with three. Internationally, the single topped the charts in seventeen countries including Australia, Canada, New Zealand, Ireland, and the United Kingdom, making it both the Chainsmokers' and Halsey's first chart-topping song in all six countries. The song went on to become the first song to spend 26 weeks in the top five of the Billboard Hot 100 chart. It also became the second song in the history of the Hot 100 chart to spend 32 weeks in the top ten of the chart.

The song was performed live for the first time at the Number Fest Concert at Ohio University on Saturday, April 16, 2016. The Chainsmokers performed “Closer” for the second time at Coachella on Sunday, April 17, 2016. Halsey and the Chainsmokers performed the track live at the 2016 MTV Video Music Awards as well as a remix of the song at the 2016 American Music Awards. Its music video was released on October 24, 2016. It received a nomination for Best Pop Duo/Group Performance at the 2017 Grammy Awards.

In 2018, the song received a diamond certification by the RIAA for selling 10 million units in the United States, later being certified 18× Platinum in 2026. In 2023, the Chainsmokers collaborated with Japanese rock star Yoshiki to perform a classical version of "Closer" in the documentary film Yoshiki: Under the Sky.

== Background and release ==
The song's beat was created in a session between Chainsmokers member Andrew Taggart and Freddy Kennett of Louis the Child. Taggart wrote the song with Canadian DJ Shaun Frank in one session, and Frank encouraged him to sing on the song. According to Taggart, the track was inspired by the Blink-182 song "I Miss You", which the duo were listening to on repeat and is referenced in the song. He later said the song instead was "Feeling This", though he could not really remember which: "I've listened to their self-titled album so many times the whole thing is pretty much beat," he tweeted. The band Taking Back Sunday also influenced the song. The song is about a couple who broke up and unexpectedly meet long after, leading to romantic attraction again. Before Halsey was brought on as the female vocalist, the collaboration was originally supposed to feature former Fifth Harmony member Camila Cabello.

The song was mixed by Jordan Young who also oversaw the recording of the guest vocal.

After comparisons were drawn between "Closer" and The Fray's "Over My Head (Cable Car)", lead singer Isaac Slade and guitarist Joe King of The Fray were credited as co-writers of "Closer" on September 2, 2016. The song was released on July 29, 2016 through Disruptor Records and Columbia Records. Genius pointed out the similarity between "Closer" and Fetty Wap's "679" in September 2016, claiming that the songs' choruses are nearly identical, with the only major difference being that Fetty's is in D major and The Chainsmokers' is in A♭ major. Genius even cut together a video of the choruses playing over each other.

== Composition and lyrics ==
The song is written in the key of A♭ major with a common time tempo of 95 beats per minute and a chord progression of D♭(9)–E♭6add4–Fm7–E♭. The vocals span from E♭2 to B♭5.

The title of the song comes from part of the main hook: the singer asks his lover to "pull them closer" in the car's back seat. The words to the song speak to "youth" and "heartbreak". The song makes references to Range Rover vehicles, the cities of Boulder, Colorado and Tucson, Arizona, and the band Blink-182. It talks about being broke and passionate.

== Critical reception ==
Matt Medved of Billboard wrote the song "sounds like an instant classic," stating that it "[boasts] an earworm chorus and evocative verses like 'play that Blink-182 song that we beat to death in Tucson,' (one of Halsey's few solo verses), "Closer" captures the millennial zeitgeist in brilliantly infectious fashion." MTV journalist Deepa Lakshmin called the song "an upbeat, dance-worthy jam that deserves a spot on your summer playlist. It'll make you forget about all your pesky life problems and live in the moment." The song received a more mixed review from Idolator, with a consensus from various editors resulting in a 5/10 rating. While reviewing Halsey's 2021 album If I Can't Have Love, I Want Power, Dani Blum of Pitchfork described their (Note: Halsey's pronouns are she/her and they/them. This article uses they/them pronouns for consistency.) "Auto-Tuned" part of the song as the "ache [...] that threatened to define their career."

Billboard ranked "Closer" at number 29 on their "100 Best Pop Songs of 2016" list: "The year's longest-running No. 1 on the Hot 100 was as predictable a smash as they come: Perfectly played duet drama, an immediately recognizable hook – maybe a little too instantly recognizable – and a Blink-182 reference that made every Millennial listening nod with begrudging respect. Overplay might've done The Chainsmokers and Halsey a temporary disservice, but just wait for the emotional rush that hits in 2025 when you're hanging in a hotel bar and hear this for the first time in years."

== Commercial performance ==
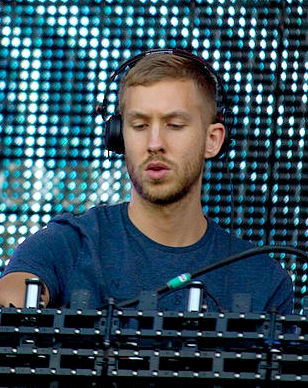
Calvin Harris (pictured) had three songs that topped Billboard's Hot Dance/Electronic Songs chart; "Closer" became the Chainsmoker's fourth song to do so and break the record.

"Closer" debuted at number nine on the Billboard Hot 100 in the issue dated August 20, 2016. It became the third top ten single for the Chainsmokers on the chart, after "Roses" and "Don't Let Me Down". It is Halsey's first top ten on the chart and their second top forty. In the issue dated September 3, 2016, the song moved from number six to one, becoming both artists' first number-one song and the first song by a duo to top the chart since Macklemore & Ryan Lewis' "Thrift Shop" and "Can't Hold Us" in 2013. It is also the first song titled "Closer" to reach number one (Ne-Yo's song of the same name reached number 7 in 2008). Moreover, the song also topped the Dance/Electronic Songs chart, becoming the first song to reach number one on both the Hot 100 and the Dance/Electronic chart simultaneously since Baauer's "Harlem Shake" in early 2013. It became the duo's fourth number-one song to top the latter chart, passing Calvin Harris' previous record of three songs. It went on to top the Hot 100 chart for twelve consecutive weeks.

On the issue dated November 5, 2016, "Closer" became the 33rd song to top the chart for at least 10 weeks. By spending an 11th week atop the chart, it became the longest number-one single of 2016, surpassing Drake's "One Dance" which spent 10 non-consecutive weeks at number one. In its fourth week, the song was joined by Twenty One Pilots' "Heathens", which moved from number three to number two. This marked the first time (and the third time overall) that duos have held the top two spots at the same time since June 1985, when Tears for Fears was on top with "Everybody Wants to Rule the World" and Wham! was number two with "Everything She Wants." (The week before, the two songs were in the opposite order.) On the chart issue dated November 26, 2016, the song was ousted from number one by "Black Beatles" by Rae Sremmurd featuring Gucci Mane. On the issue dated January 28, 2017, "Closer" surpassed Justin Bieber's "Love Yourself" for the most weeks logged in the top 10 from a song's debut, having totaled all 32 of its weeks on the chart in the region since its debut on the issue dated August 20, 2016.

On the issue dated March 11, 2017, "Closer" became the 4th song to stay in the top ten for 30 weeks. Only LeAnn Rimes' "How Do I Live", Santana's 1999 single "Smooth" (feat. Rob Thomas) and Mark Ronson's "Uptown Funk" (feat. Bruno Mars) have achieved this feat since the Billboard Hot 100 was formed in 1958. On the issue dated March 25, 2017, "Closer" spent its 32nd week in the top ten, tying LeAnn Rimes' all-time record with "How Do I Live", before finally dropping out the following week. The record was broken later that year by Ed Sheeran's "Shape of You", which spent 33 consecutive weeks in the top ten. The song's long run within the top 10 caused it to place at number 7 on Billboard's 2017 year-end chart after placing at number 10 the previous year, making "Closer" one of only four songs in the history of the chart to be ranked on the top ten of two separate Hot 100 year-end charts, along with Chubby Checker's "The Twist" (#10 in 1960 and #9 in 1962), Elton John's "Candle in the Wind 1997" (#1 in 1997 and #8 in 1998), and LeAnn Rimes' "How Do I Live" (#9 in 1997 and #5 in 1998).

"Closer" achieved its 12th week atop Digital Songs with 84,000 downloads sold in the week ending October 27, according to Nielsen Music; the total is the lowest for a number-one song on the tally in 10 years. The track became the third best-selling song of the year, behind Flo Rida's "My House" and Justin Timberlake's "Can't Stop the Feeling!".

Internationally, the song reached number one in Australia on August 13, 2016, also becoming both the Chainsmokers' and Halsey's first number-one song there. It also peaked at number one in the UK, New Zealand and Canada. The song topped the UK Singles Chart for four weeks, becoming the first song by a duo to log multiple weeks at number one in both the US and the UK since LMFAO's "Party Rock Anthem" in 2011.

"Closer" is currently the fifteenth most streamed song on Spotify. On May 19, 2017, it became only the second song to achieve 1 billion streams on the streaming platform. In April 2021, "Closer" surpassed 2 billion streams on Spotify, making it the sixth song to do so.

== Lyric video ==
The lyric video for "Closer" was edited and directed by Rory Kramer, and features Alyssa Lynch and Jordan Wright. It received one billion views on January 10, 2017, and two billion views on February 4, 2018, making it the first lyric video ever to reach these milestones. As of January 2026, it has received over 3.3 billion views, and is among the fifty most-viewed videos of all time.

== Music video ==
Andrew Taggart and Halsey in a scene of the official music video for "Closer."

The music video for "Closer", directed by Dano Cerny, was released on October 24, 2016. The video begins with the Chainsmokers' Andrew Taggart looking at Halsey while at a party. It then flashes back to an earlier time where Taggart and Halsey's characters met for the first time in a party, where they eventually ended up kissing in a kitchen. Through the video, Halsey and Taggart are seen singing, with Halsey in a bra and panties and Taggart shirtless, with both in bed.

The video ends with Halsey leaving the party in present time. Taggart follows them outside and Halsey stops and turns around to see Taggart. They both look at each other, implying they regret drifting apart.

== Live performances ==
The Chainsmokers invited Halsey to the stage during their set at the Bonnaroo Music Festival to perform "Closer" for the first time in June 2016. Halsey and Taggart also performed the song live when they closed the show at the 2016 MTV Video Music Awards. The Chainsmokers and Halsey also performed "Closer" at the American Music Awards on November 20, 2016.

== Remix ==
The official remix features American rapper Wiz Khalifa. It was released online on March 17, 2017.

== Awards and nominations ==
Year	Organization	Award	Result	Ref.
2016	MTV Video Music Awards	Song of Summer	Nominated	
2017	Grammy Awards	Best Pop Duo/Group Performance	Nominated	
2017	iHeartRadio Music Awards	Song of the Year	Nominated	
2017	iHeartRadio Music Awards	Dance Song of the Year	Won	
2017	iHeartRadio Music Awards	Best Lyrics	Nominated	
2017	iHeartRadio Music Awards	Best Collaboration	Nominated	
2017	Myx Music Awards	Favorite International Video	Won	
2017	Radio Disney Music Awards	Song of the Year	Nominated	
2017	Radio Disney Music Awards	Best Song to Lip Sync To	Nominated	
2017	Billboard Music Awards	Top Hot 100 Song	Won	
2017	Billboard Music Awards	Top Selling Song	Nominated	
2017	Billboard Music Awards	Top Radio Song	Nominated	
2017	Billboard Music Awards	Top Collaboration	Won	
2017	Billboard Music Awards	Top Streaming Song (Audio)	Nominated	
2017	Billboard Music Awards	Top Streaming Song (Video)	Nominated	
2017	Billboard Music Awards	Top Dance/Electronic Song	Won	
2017	Teen Choice Awards	Choice Music Single: Group	Nominated	
2017	Teen Choice Awards	Choice Music: Pop Song	Nominated	
2017	MTV Video Music Awards	Best Collaboration	Nominated	
2017	MTV Video Music Awards	Best Editing	Nominated	
2017	American Music Awards	Collaboration of the Year	Nominated	
2017	American Music Awards	Favorite Pop/Rock Song	Nominated	

== Track listing ==
Digital download
No.	Title	Length
1.	"Closer" (featuring Halsey)	4:04

Digital download – Remixes EP
No.	Title	Length
1.	"Closer" (featuring Halsey) (R3hab Remix)	2:41
2.	"Closer" (featuring Halsey) (Shaun Frank Remix)	4:12
3.	"Closer" (featuring Halsey) (T-Mass Remix)	4:07
4.	"Closer" (featuring Halsey) (Wuki Remix)	4:04
5.	"Closer" (featuring Halsey) (ARMNHMR Remix)	4:26
6.	"Closer" (featuring Halsey) (Robotaki Remix)	4:12

== Charts ==
=== Weekly charts ===
Chart (2016–2021)	Peak position
Argentina (Monitor Latino)	10
Argentina Digital Songs (CAPIF)	9
Australia (ARIA)	1
Australia Dance (ARIA)	1
Austria (Ö3 Austria Top 40)	2
Belgium (Ultratop 50 Flanders)	1
Belgium (Ultratop 50 Wallonia)	5
Brazil Hot 100 Airplay (Billboard Brasil)	1
Brazil (Billboard Brasil Pop Airplay)	1
Canada Hot 100 (Billboard)	1
Canada AC (Billboard)	11
Canada CHR/Top 40 (Billboard)	1
Canada Hot AC (Billboard)	1
Colombia (National-Report)	29
Czech Republic Airplay (ČNS IFPI)	3
Czech Republic Singles Digital (ČNS IFPI)	1
Denmark (Tracklisten)	1
Euro Digital Song Sales (Billboard)	1
Finland (Suomen virallinen lista)	5
France (SNEP)	31
Germany (GfK)	2
Germany Dance (Official German Charts)	1
Global 200 (Billboard)	100
Hungary (Rádiós Top 40)	6
Hungary (Single Top 40)	8
Ireland (IRMA)	1
Israel International Airplay (Media Forest)	3
Italy (FIMI)	2
Japan Hot 100 (Billboard)	29
Lebanon (Lebanese Top 20)	2
Malaysia (RIM)	8
Mexico Ingles Airplay (Billboard)	1
Netherlands (Dutch Top 40)	1
Netherlands (Single Top 100)	1
New Zealand (Recorded Music NZ)	1
Norway (VG-lista)	1
Philippines (Philippines Hot 100)	78
Poland Airplay (ZPAV)	17
Portugal (AFP)	2
Romania (Media Forest)	2
Russia Airplay (Tophit)	40
Scottish Singles Sales (Official Charts)	1
Serbia (Radiomonitor)	5
Slovakia Airplay (ČNS IFPI)	22
Slovakia Singles Digital (ČNS IFPI)	1
Slovenia (SloTop50)	18
South Korea (Circle)	48
South Korea Foreign (Circle)	2
Spain (Promusicae)	4
Sweden (Sverigetopplistan)	1
Switzerland (Schweizer Hitparade)	5
UK Singles (Official Charts)	1
UK Dance (Official Charts)	1
US Billboard Hot 100	1
US Adult Contemporary (Billboard)	8
US Adult Pop Airplay (Billboard)	1
US Dance Airplay (Billboard)	1
US Dance Club Songs (Billboard)	2
US Hot Dance/Electronic Songs (Billboard)	1
US Latin Airplay (Billboard)	43
US Pop Airplay (Billboard)	1
US Rhythmic Airplay (Billboard)	2
Venezuela English (Record Report)	1

Chart (2026)	Peak position
Global 200 (Billboard)	96
Philippines Hot 100 (Billboard Philippines)	71

=== Year-end charts ===
Chart (2016)	Position
Argentina (Monitor Latino)	47
Australia (ARIA)	1
Australia Dance (ARIA)	1
Austria (Ö3 Austria Top 40)	19
Belgium (Ultratop Flanders)	13
Belgium (Ultratop Wallonia)	44
Brazil (Brasil Hot 100)	33
Canada (Canadian Hot 100)	10
Denmark (Tracklisten)	26
France (SNEP)	89
Germany (Official German Charts)	18
Hungary (Single Top 40)	39
Iceland (Plötutíóindi)	34
Italy (FIMI)	27
Netherlands (Dutch Top 40)	9
Netherlands (Single Top 100)	22
New Zealand (Recorded Music NZ)	3
South Korea Foreign (Circle)	22
Spain (PROMUSICAE)	62
Sweden (Sverigetopplistan)	16
Switzerland (Schweizer Hitparade)	44
UK Singles (Official Charts Company)	7
US Billboard Hot 100	10
US Adult Top 40 (Billboard)	36
US Dance Club Songs (Billboard)	36
US Hot Dance/Electronic Songs (Billboard)	2
US Mainstream Top 40 (Billboard)	16
US Rhythmic (Billboard)	30
Worldwide (IFPI)	3
Chart (2017)	Position
Australia (ARIA)	51
Australia Dance (ARIA)	10
Belgium (Ultratop Flanders)	83
Brazil (Pro-Música Brasil)	45
Canada (Canadian Hot 100)	3
Denmark (Tracklisten)	78
France (SNEP)	187
Hungary (Single Top 40)	96
Hungary (Stream Top 40)	44
Italy (FIMI)	48
Japan (Japan Hot 100)	28
Netherlands (Single Top 100)	97
New Zealand (Recorded Music NZ)	41
Portugal (AFP)	65
South Korea (Circle)	52
South Korea Foreign (Circle)	2
Spain (PROMUSICAE)	98
Sweden (Sverigetopplistan)	86
Switzerland (Schweizer Hitparade)	67
UK Singles (Official Charts Company)	71
US Billboard Hot 100	7
US Adult Contemporary (Billboard)	15
US Adult Top 40 (Billboard)	14
US Hot Dance/Electronic Songs (Billboard)	2
US Mainstream Top 40 (Billboard)	22
Worldwide (IFPI)	5
Chart (2018)	Position
Australia Dance (ARIA)	19
South Korea (Circle)	95
South Korea Foreign (Circle)	6
Chart (2019)	Position
Australia Dance (ARIA)	15
Chart (2020)	Position
Australia Dance (ARIA)	17
Chart (2021)	Position
Australia Dance (ARIA)	13
Global 200 (Billboard)	88
Chart (2022)	Position
Australia Dance (ARIA)	19
Global 200 (Billboard)	154
Chart (2023)	Position
Australia Dance (ARIA)	22
Chart (2024)	Position
Australia Dance (ARIA)	19
Chart (2025)	Position
Australia Dance (ARIA)	16
Global 200 (Billboard)	136

=== Decade-end charts ===
Chart (2010–2019)	Position
Australia (ARIA)	15
UK Singles (Official Charts Company)	35
US Billboard Hot 100	4
US Hot Dance/Electronic Songs (Billboard)	6

=== All-time charts ===
Chart	Position
US Mainstream Top 40 (Billboard)	9
US Billboard Hot 100	14

== Certifications ==
Region	Certification	Certified units/sales
Australia (ARIA)	20× Platinum	1,400,000^{‡}
Austria (IFPI Austria)	Platinum	30,000^{‡}
Belgium (BRMA)	3× Platinum	60,000^{‡}
Brazil (Pro-Música Brasil)	3× Diamond	750,000^{‡}
Canada (Music Canada)	2× Diamond	1,600,000^{‡}
Denmark (IFPI Danmark)	4× Platinum	360,000^{‡}
France (SNEP)	Diamond	233,333^{‡}
Germany (BVMI)	2× Platinum	800,000^{‡}
Italy (FIMI)	6× Platinum	300,000^{‡}
Mexico (AMPROFON)	2× Diamond+4× Platinum	840,000^{‡}
Netherlands (NVPI)	Platinum	40,000^{‡}
New Zealand (RMNZ)	10× Platinum	300,000^{‡}
Norway (IFPI Norway)	3× Platinum	180,000^{‡}
Poland (ZPAV)	Diamond	100,000^{‡}
Portugal (AFP)	2× Platinum	20,000^{‡}
Spain (Promusicae)	3× Platinum	180,000^{‡}
Sweden (GLF)	5× Platinum	200,000^{‡}
United Kingdom (BPI)	5× Platinum	3,000,000^{‡}
United States (RIAA)	18× Platinum	18,000,000^{‡}
Streaming
Japan (RIAJ)	2× Platinum	200,000,000^{†}
Japan (RIAJ) Tokyo Remix (feat. Mackenyu Nitta)	Gold	50,000,000^{†}
South Korea	—	100,000,000
^{‡} Sales+streaming figures based on certification alone.^{†} Streaming-only figures based on certification alone.

== Release history ==
Region	Date	Format	Version	Label	Ref.
Various	July 29, 2016	Digital download	Original	Disruptor; Columbia	
United States	August 2, 2016	Contemporary hit radio	Original	Disruptor; Columbia	
United States	August 2, 2016	Rhythmic radio	Original	Disruptor; Columbia	
Italy	August 26, 2016	Contemporary hit radio	Original	Sony	
Various	September 23, 2016	Digital download	Remixes EP	Disruptor; Columbia	

== See also ==
- "Don't You Want Me", 1981 song by The Human League with a similar duet style and lyrical content
