= Shaun Frank =

Canadian electronic musician

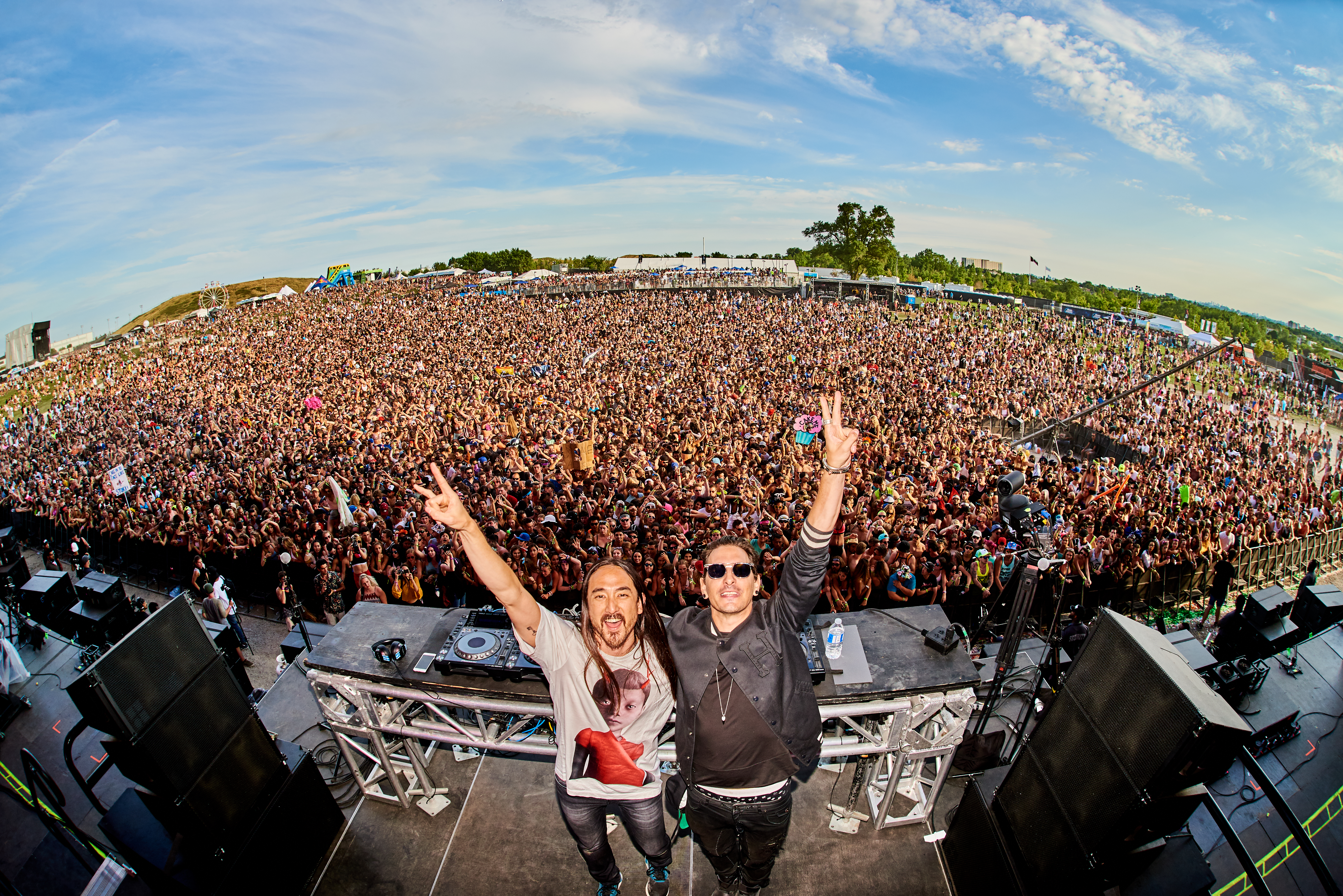
- Frank (right) performing with Steve Aoki at VELD Music Festival 2016

Background information
- Born: Shaun Charles Frank; June 7, 1982 (age 44); Vancouver, British Columbia, Canada
- Genres: House; trap
- Occupations: DJ; record producer
- Instruments: Piano; guitar; synthesizer
- Years active: 2008–present
- Labels: Armada Trice; Dim Mak; Spinnin'; EMI; Ultra; Size
- Website: shaunfrank.com

Shaun Charles Frank (born June 7, 1982) is a Canadian DJ and record producer. He was a part of the band Crowned King and later left that to join Envy. He ventured on his own after Envy broke up and has collaborated with EDM artists around the world. He has many charting singles and remixes credited to his name.

== Career ==
Shaun Frank was the singer of Crowned King, a Canadian pop/rock band. After that, Frank was involved with The Envy, a Canadian alternative/rock band which was managed by Simmons Records, Gene Simmons' label. The Envy opened for KISS in 2010 on their Hottest Show on Earth Tour. Shaun started his new path after The Envy broke up because of external problems with some band members. Many collaborations with renowned artists of international EDM scene are to his credit (such as Oliver Heldens, Borgeous, KSHMR, DVBBS, and The Chainsmokers).

Frank's remix of Grandtheft and Delaney Jane's song "Easy Go" was featured in the official remix EP. He released the song "Heaven" with American DJ KSHMR who remixed it twice. In 2016, Frank co-wrote the chart-topping single "Closer" by The Chainsmokers. His single "Let You Get Away", which features Ashe was released. The song peaked on Billboard's Dance/Mix Show Airplay chart at 36. The song received a nomination for Best Dance Recording at the 2017 Juno Awards.

Since 2020, Frank has been part of the electronic duo Kasablanca under the pseudonym Micky Kasablanca, which he leads with Viktor Kasablanca. Kasablanca embarked on a world tour in 2024 and 2025 to promoted their debut album, Higher REsolution, with stops in North America, and India.

== Discography ==
=== Extended plays ===
Title	Details	Track listing
Activ8	Released: November 8, 2019; Label: Regicide Entertainment; Format: Digital download	Track listing: 1. "Higher State"; 2. "Don't Tell the Bank" (featuring Roshin); 3. "Pass the Aux" (featuring Roshin); 4. "Activ8"

=== Charting singles ===
Title	Year	Peak chart positions					Certifications
Title	Year	CAN	BEL	FRA	NLD	US Dance	Certifications
"This Could Be Love" (with Borgeous featuring Delaney Jane)	2014	–	104	—	—	—	
"Shades of Grey" (with Oliver Heldens featuring Delaney Jane)	2015	–	60	–	65	—	
"Heaven" (with KSHMR featuring Delaney Jane)	2015	–	71	—	—	—	
"La La Land" (with DVBBS featuring Delaney Jane)	2016	93	–	157	41	24	MC: Gold
"Let You Get Away" (featuring Ashe)	2016	96	—	—	—	—	MC: Gold
"Tokyo Nights" (with Digital Farm Animals and Dragonette)	2018	97	—	—	—	—	MC: Gold
"—" denotes a recording that did not chart or was not released in that territory.

=== Other singles ===
- 2013: We Are (with Jake Shanahan & Carl Nunes) [Armada Trice]
- 2013: Unbreakable (with Marien Baker) [EMI Music]
- 2014: Vagabond (with Vanrip) [Dim Mak Records]
- 2015: Jonezin
- 2015: Mind Made Up [Dim Mak Records]
- 2015: Time [Size Records]
- 2015: All About (with Vanrip) [Dim Mak Records]
- 2015: Dope Girlz (with Steve Aoki) [Dim Mak Records]
- 2017: No Future (featuring Dyson) [Ultra Music]
- 2017: Upsidedown [Ultra Music]
- 2017: Addicted (with Violet Days) [Ultra Music]
- 2018: Gold Wings (with Krewella) [Ultra Music]
- 2018: Bon Appétit (featuring Ya-Le) [Ultra Music]
- 2018: Shapes (with Hunter Siegel featuring Roshin) [Spinnin' Records]
- 2019: Throwback (with Delaney Jane) [Dirty Pretty Things]
- 2019: Where Do You Go (featuring Lexy Panterra) [Spinnin' Records]
- 2020: At Night (with 3lau featuring Grabbitz) [Blume]
- 2020: On Your Mind (with Alicia Moffet) [Physical Presents]
- 2020: Take Me Over [Physical Presents]
- 2021: Crazy (with Tony Romera) [Armada Music]
- 2021: Save Me (with Ryland James) [Physical Presents]

=== Remixes ===
- 2014: Down With Webster – "Chills" (Shaun Frank Remix) [Armada Trice]
- 2014: Kiesza – "Take Me to Church" (Shaun Frank Remix) [Dim Mak Records]
- 2015: Steve Aoki featuring Flux Pavilion – "Get Me Outta Here" (Shaun Frank Remix) [Ultra Music]
- 2015: Vicetone featuring JHart – "Follow Me" (Shaun Frank Remix) [Ultra Music]
- 2015: Duke Dumont – "Ocean Drive" (Shaun Frank Remix) [Virgin EMI]
- 2015: Grace featuring G-Eazy – "You Don't Own Me" (Shaun Frank Remix) [RCA]
- 2016: The Chainsmokers – "Closer" (Shaun Frank Remix) [Disruptor]
- 2017: Shawn Hook featuring Vanessa Hudgens – "Reminding Me" (Shaun Frank Remix) [UMG Recordings]
- 2017: Cash Cash featuring Conor Maynard – "All My Love" (Shaun Frank Remix) [Big Beat Records]
- 2017: Crankdat – "Dollars" [Asylum Records]
- 2018: Tritonal featuring Riley Clemmons – "Out My Mind" [Enhanced Music]
- 2018: BLVK JVCK featuring Jessie Reyez – "Love Me Still" (Shaun Frank Remix) [Big Beat Records]
- 2018: Louis The Child featuring Wafia – "Better Not" (Shaun Frank Remix) [Interscope Records]

=== Songwriting and Production credits ===
Title	Year	Artist(s)	Album	Credits	Written with	Produced with
"Air" (featuring Delaney Jane)	2015	Dzeko & Torres	Non-album single	Co-writer	Julian Dzeko, Luis Raposo, Delaney Jane	–
"Closer" (featuring Halsey)	2016	The Chainsmokers	Collage EP	Co-writer	Andrew Taggart, Frederic Kennett, Ashley Frangipane, Isaac Slade, Joseph King	–
"Howl"	2017	Delaney Jane	Non-album singles	Co-writer/Producer	Delaney Jane, Ashe, Lincoln Jesser	–
"California" (featuring Brynn Elliott)	2017	Dzeko	Non-album singles	Co-writer	T. Bridges, Luis Raposo, Julian Dzeko, Delaney Barth, Tijs Verwest	–
"Heart Speak" (featuring TOKA-J)	2017	Dzeko	Non-album singles	Co-writer	A. Storm, Delaney Barth, J. Loeffler, N. Sampermans, Tijs Verwest	–
"Sick Boy"	2018	The Chainsmokers	Sick Boy	Producer	–	The Chainsmokers
"You Owe Me"	2018	The Chainsmokers	Sick Boy	Producer	–	The Chainsmokers
"Everybody Hates Me"	2018	The Chainsmokers	Sick Boy	Producer	–	The Chainsmokers
"I Got You"	2019	Olivia Lunny	The Launch Season 2 EP	Co-writer/Producer	Jenson Vaughn, Kris Eriksson, Danny Shah, Kayleigh O'Connor	-
"You Don't Know Me" (with Sigala and Flo Rida featuring Delaney Jane)	2019	Sigala	Brighter Days	Co-writer/Producer	Bruce Fielder, Mich Hansen, Daniel Heløy Davidsen, Peter Wallevik, Bennett, Tramar Dillard	Sigala, Cutfather, Alexander Healy
"On My California" (with Tiësto featuring Snoop Dogg and Fontwell)	2020	Tiësto	The London Sessions	Co-writer/Producer	Tiësto, Aaron Fontwell, Yaakov Gruzman, Alexander Healy, Calvin Broadus Jr.	Tiësto, Luis Torres, Yaakov Gruzman, Alexander Healy
"Dead Man Running"	2022	Seulgi	28 Reasons	Co-writer	Seulgi, Yaakov Gruzman, Audra Mae	
