= The Chainsmokers =

American music producer duo

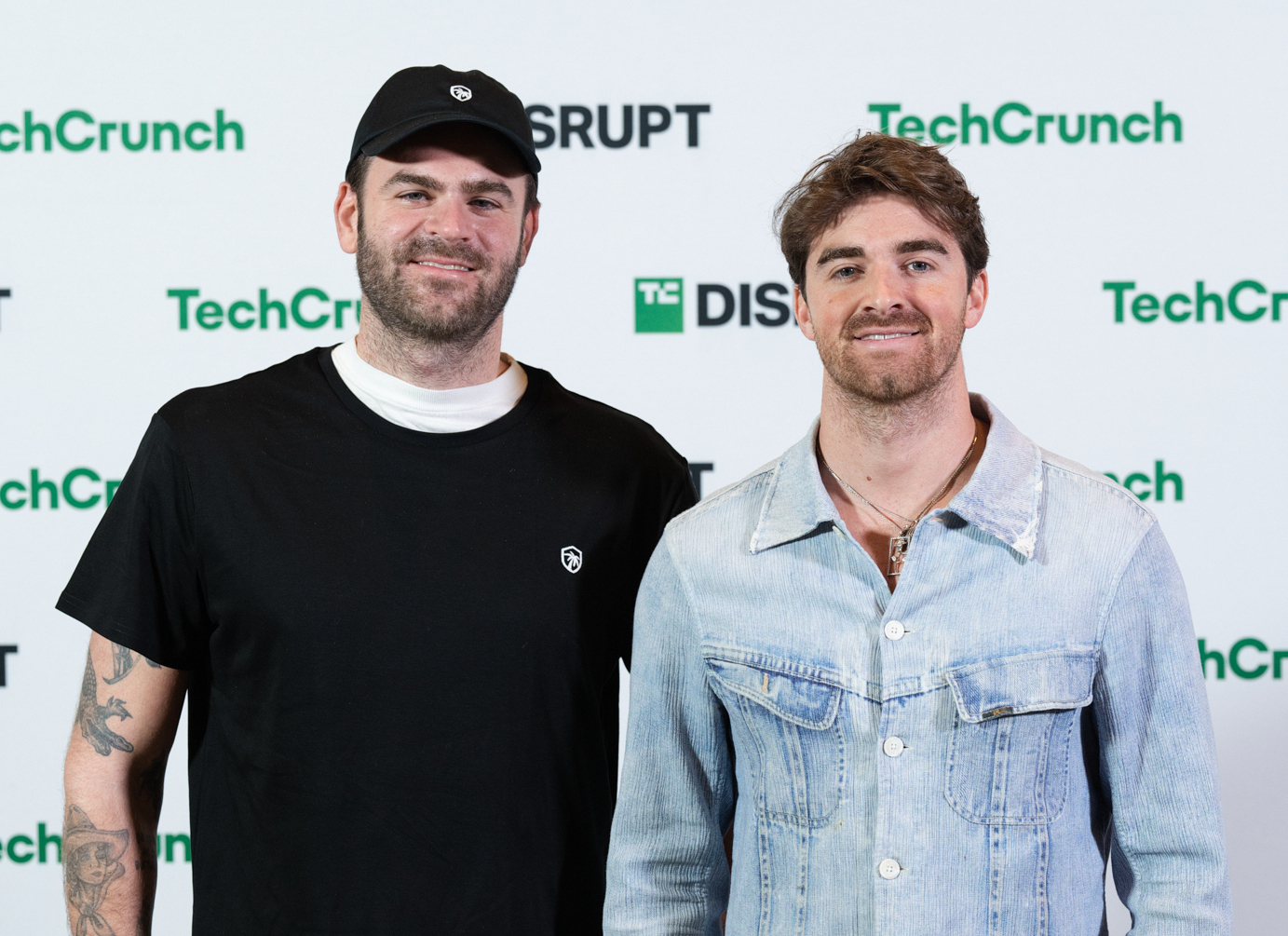
- The Chainsmokers in 2024; L–R: Alex Pall, Drew Taggart

Background information
- Origin: New York City, U.S.
- Genres: EDM; pop; electropop; future bass
- Works: Discography
- Years active: 2012–present
- Labels: Secondhand Happiness; Disruptor; Columbia; Sony
- Members: Alex Pall; Drew Taggart
- Website: thechainsmokers.com

Signature
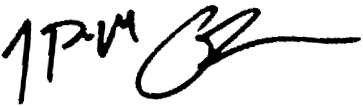

The Chainsmokers are an American electronic DJ and production duo consisting of Alex Pall and Drew Taggart. They started out by releasing remixes of songs by indie artists. The EDM-pop duo achieved a breakthrough with their 2014 song "#Selfie", which became a top-20 single in several countries. They have won a Grammy Award, two American Music Awards, seven Billboard Music Awards and nine iHeartRadio Music Awards. According to Forbes' 2019 list of highest-paid celebrities, the Chainsmokers were the highest-paid DJs, dethroning Calvin Harris after six years.

Their debut EP, Bouquet, was released in October 2015 and featured the single "Roses", which reached the top 10 on the US Billboard Hot 100. "Don't Let Me Down", featuring American singer Daya, became their first top-five single on the Billboard chart and won the Grammy Award for Best Dance Recording at the 59th awards ceremony. Their single "Closer", featuring American singer-songwriter Halsey, became their first number-one single on the Billboard chart. The duo's second EP, Collage, was released in November 2016. Their debut studio album, Memories...Do Not Open, was released in April 2017 and topped the US Billboard 200 chart, with two singles "Paris" and "Something Just Like This" reaching the top 10 on the US Billboard Hot 100. Their second album, Sick Boy, was released in December 2018. Their third studio album, World War Joy, was released in December 2019 and debuted at No. 1 on the Billboard Top Dance/Electronic Albums Chart. So Far So Good, their fourth studio album, was released on May 13, 2022. Their fifth studio album, Summertime Friends, followed on October 20, 2023. In 2024, the duo released their third EP, No Hard Feelings.

== Career ==
=== 2012: Formation ===
The Chainsmokers were initially made up of Pall and former DJ Rhett Bixler. The Chainsmokers were re-formed as an EDM DJ duo in 2012 under the management of Adam Alpert in New York City. Pall attended New York University for art history and music business while Taggart had been attending Syracuse University and was an intern at Interscope Records before the two met. Taggart had taken an interest in being a DJ and released some original songs on the website SoundCloud. Taggart was informed by someone working for Alpert that a duo, which was being managed by Alpert, had an open spot after Bixler left, which prompted Taggart to leave Maine in order to go to New York City. Pall, who had grown up as a DJ and had been working at an art gallery in Chelsea, Manhattan at the time, was introduced to Taggart by Alpert. In April 2013, the Chainsmokers released a remix of "Medicine" by Daughter and it reached number 1 on HypeMachine.

The duo started out by making remixes of indie bands. In 2012, they collaborated with Indian actress and recording artist Priyanka Chopra on the single "Erase" which was followed by "The Rookie" in early 2013.

During an October 2016 television interview, ABC News Nightline reporter Nick Watt asked Pall and Taggart "What's with the (duo's) name?" Pall replied that, "At the time of conception, it was... it was totally just like I was in college. You know I enjoyed smoking weed and you know it was just like such a 'yeah the domain's open'. I don't have to have any, like, underscores." Taggart added "It's just a name." In an interview during the Upfront Summit 2023, Alex Pall stated that "Chainsmokers" was a provisional name for the group. It referred to his previous habit of smoking a lot of cigarettes, and the group needed only one name for its promotional flyers.

=== 2013–2014: First live performance and breakthrough ===
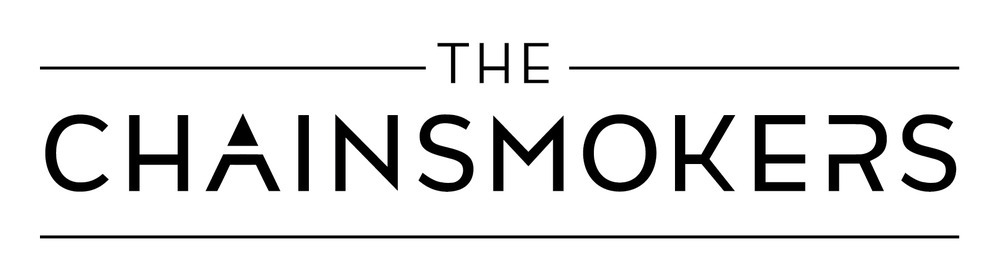
Logo before 2015

The duo's first live performance was opening for Timeflies at Terminal 5 in September 2014. Their single "#Selfie", released for free in December 2013, was picked up by Dim Mak Records who re-released it in January 2014 and eventually streamed it to Republic Records. The duo achieved breakthrough success as the single charted internationally and peaked on the Dance/Electronic Songs chart. Pall has described the song as "life-changing" for the pair.

On August 5, 2014, the Chainsmokers released "Kanye", featuring sirenXX, the follow-up to "#Selfie". Seven months later, they released "Let You Go", featuring the American synthpop group Great Good Fine Ok. They signed with Disruptor Records, a joint venture label with Sony Music Entertainment by their manager Adam Alpert, in April 2015.

=== 2015–2017: Bouquet, Collage, and Memories...Do Not Open ===
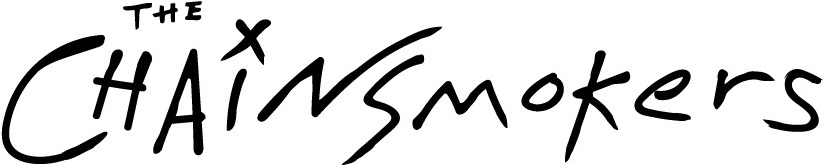
Logo from 2015 to 2018

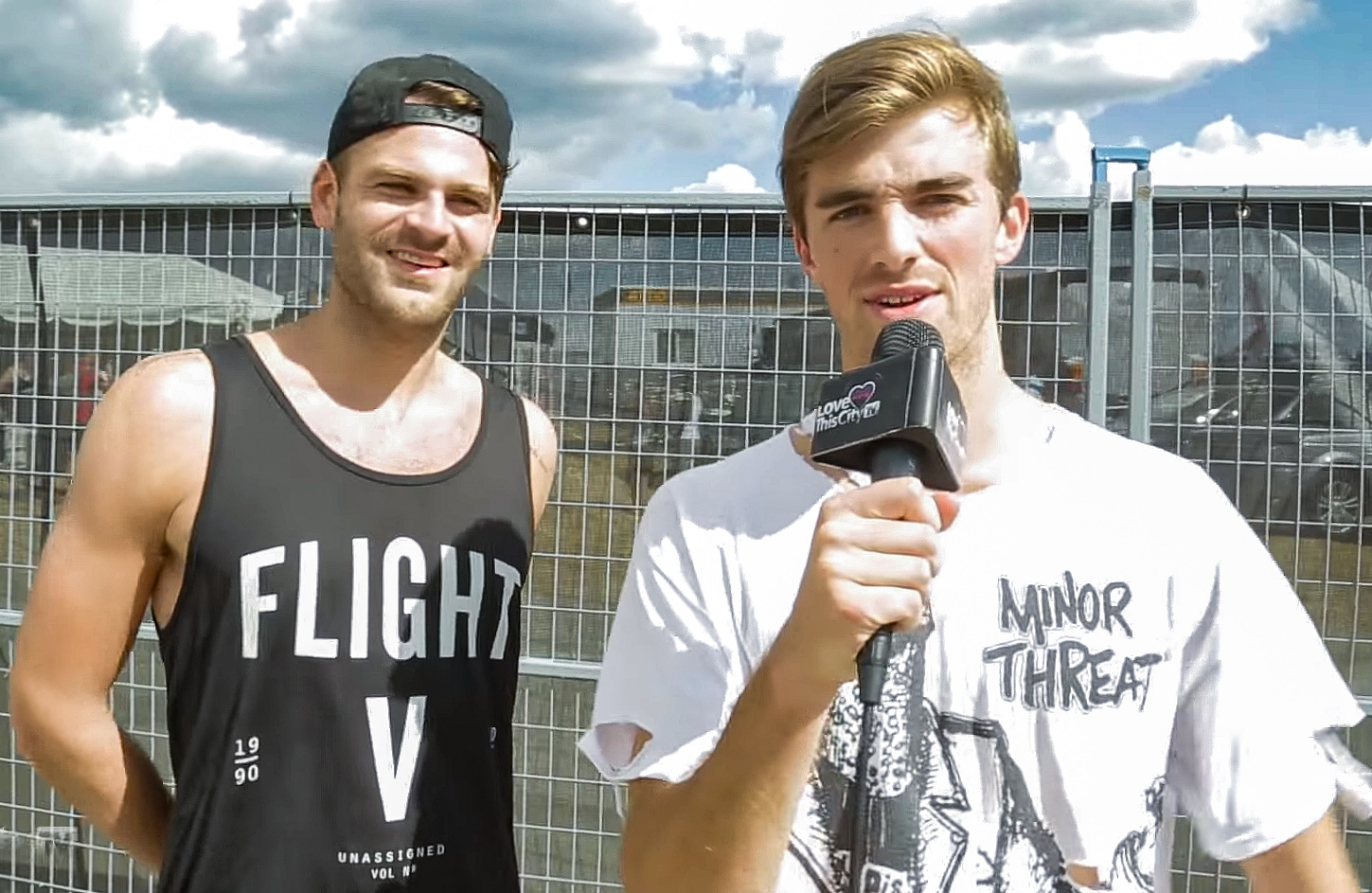
The Chainsmokers in 2015

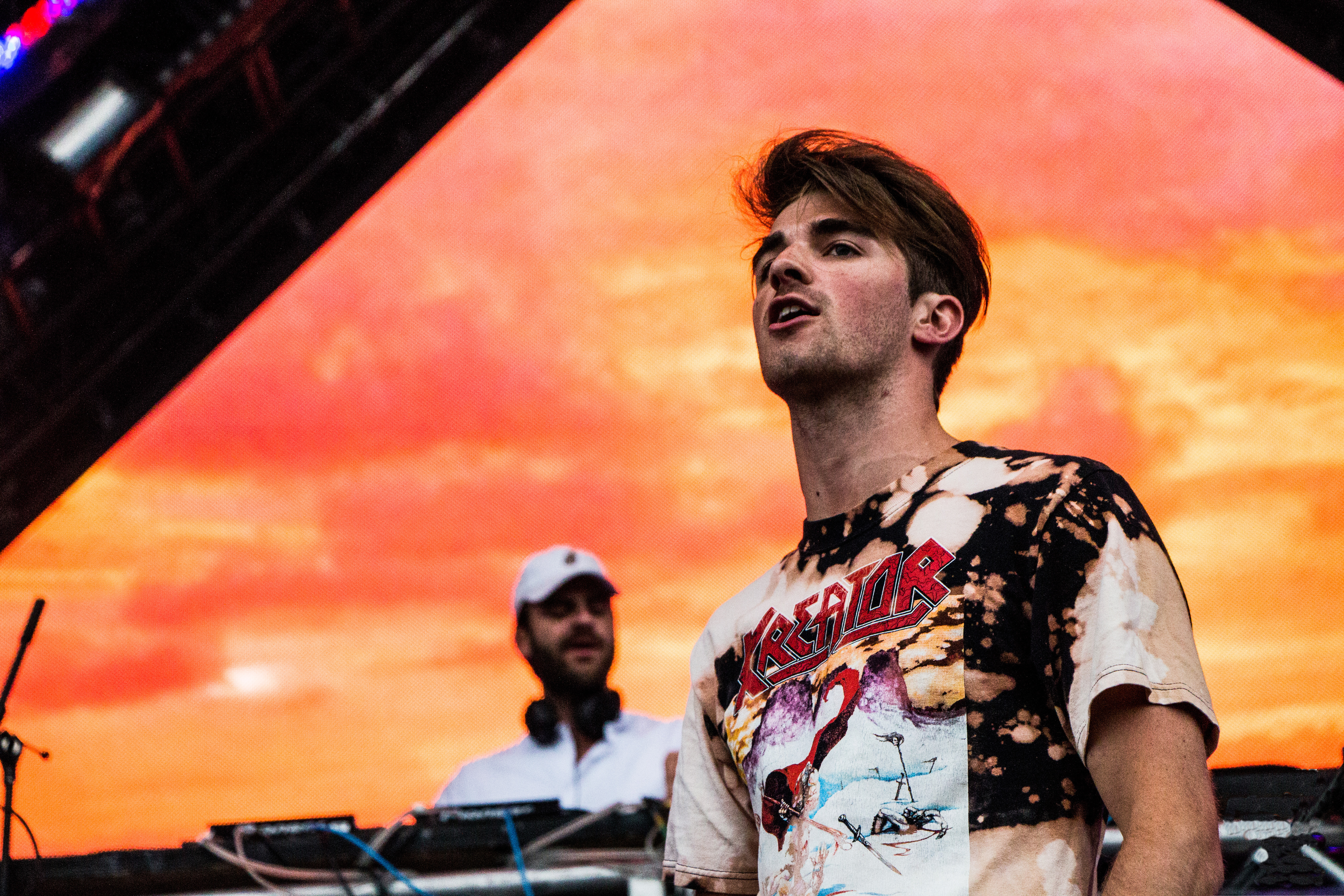
The Chainsmokers performing live at VELD Festival 2016

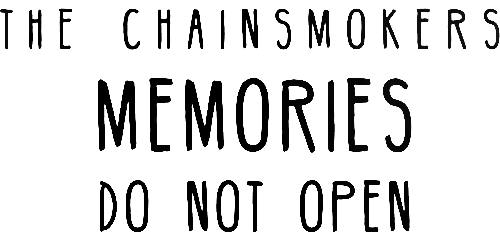
The Chainsmokers logo from the Memories...Do Not Open album and tour

On May 18, 2015, the Chainsmokers released the single "Good Intentions". Their follow-up single "Roses", released one month later on June 16, became a commercial success and has been certified multiplatinum in several countries, including the duo's native United States where it reached the top 10 of the Billboard chart. Further singles included "Waterbed", a collaboration with Dutch DJ Tiësto entitled "Split (Only U)", and "Until You Were Gone" which was released on September 18, 2015. These songs, except "Split (Only U)", were featured on the group's debut EP, Bouquet, which was released on October 23, 2015.

On February 5, 2016, the duo released a new single, "Don't Let Me Down", featuring vocals from American singer Daya, which won a Grammy award. On March 19, the group played at Ultra Music Festival, where they publicly denounced presidential candidate Donald Trump. On April 1, the duo released the single "Inside Out", featuring the Swedish singer Charlee.

On July 29, 2016, they released "Closer", featuring American singer Halsey, which peaked at number one in the United States and United Kingdom, in addition to charts in eleven other countries. The track was also performed at the 2016 MTV VMAs. The performance was met with mostly negative reception. The New York Times, Rolling Stone and Us Weekly referred to the performance as the worst of the night. Taggart himself stated in an interview with Billboard that "It sounded like shit."

"All We Know", featuring Phoebe Ryan, was released on September 29, 2016. In October 2016, the Chainsmokers were ranked 18th on DJ Magazine's annual list of the "Top 100 DJs" after debuting on the list at 97th in 2014. They released their second extended play Collage on November 4, 2016.

On January 13, 2017, the duo released "Paris", which was certified gold in Canada and the US. On the same day, they announced that they were working on their debut studio album, scheduled for release in April. The Memories Do Not Open Tour was also announced on the same day, featuring 40 North American cities beginning in April alongside support from Kiiara and Emily Warren. They announced on Instagram that they would be taking a fan, Tony Ann who is a Berklee College of Music student, with them on the tour because they were impressed with his piano cover of their song "Paris". The official video for "Paris" was directed by Mister Whitmore and starring American fashion model Martha Hunt. The official lyric video was directed by Rory Kramer.

On January 3, 2017, they announced an exclusive three-year residency deal with Wynn Nightlife. Per the agreement, they will only perform in Wynn-owned nightclubs XS Las Vegas and Encore Beach Club until the year 2019. Pall described the deal to be the "best of what Las Vegas has to offer", saying they were "thrilled" with the agreement.

On February 14, 2017, the duo announced during an on-screen Grammy red carpet interview that their debut album would be titled Memories...Do Not Open and would be released on April 7, 2017, via Disruptor/Sony. Their collaborative single with Coldplay, "Something Just Like This", was released in February 2017. The single was released simultaneously with the Chainsmokers' performance with Coldplay at the 2017 Brit Awards. "Something Just Like This" broke the record for most views of a lyric video in one day with 9 million plays. They released "The One" as a promotional single from their debut studio album on March 27, 2017.

Memories...Do Not Open was released on April 7, 2017 and debuted at number one on the Billboard 200 with 221,000 album-equivalent units, of which 166,000 were pure album sales. The album was certified double platinum in May 2022. In the same month, they were listed as third on Forbes' World's Highest Paid DJs list for 2017 with earnings of $38 million, from 12 months prior to June 2017. They also performed an unannounced set at Emo Nite LA's 3-year-anniversary mini festival.

=== 2018: Sick Boy ===
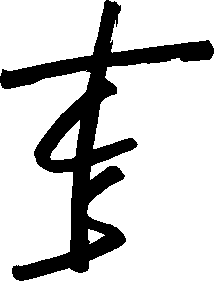
Logo from 2018 to 2021

On January 17, 2018, they released "Sick Boy", which became the lead single of their sophomore album. A month later, a new single, "You Owe Me", was released on February 16. They also debuted the song "Everybody Hates Me" during a live show in Prague, which was released on March 16. On the same month, Billboard named them as number one on their 2018 ranking of dance musicians titled Billboard Dance 100.

On April 20, they released the fourth single, entitled "Somebody", from their upcoming second studio album. In July 2018, a collaboration between the duo and American rapper Juice Wrld, titled "In My Head", was leaked online. On July 27, the duo released their fifth single of the year, featuring long time collaborator Emily Warren entitled "Side Effects". On August 24, "Save Yourself" was released. On September 18, "This Feeling" was released. They released the single "Siren", a collaboration with Parisian producer Aazar, on October 26.

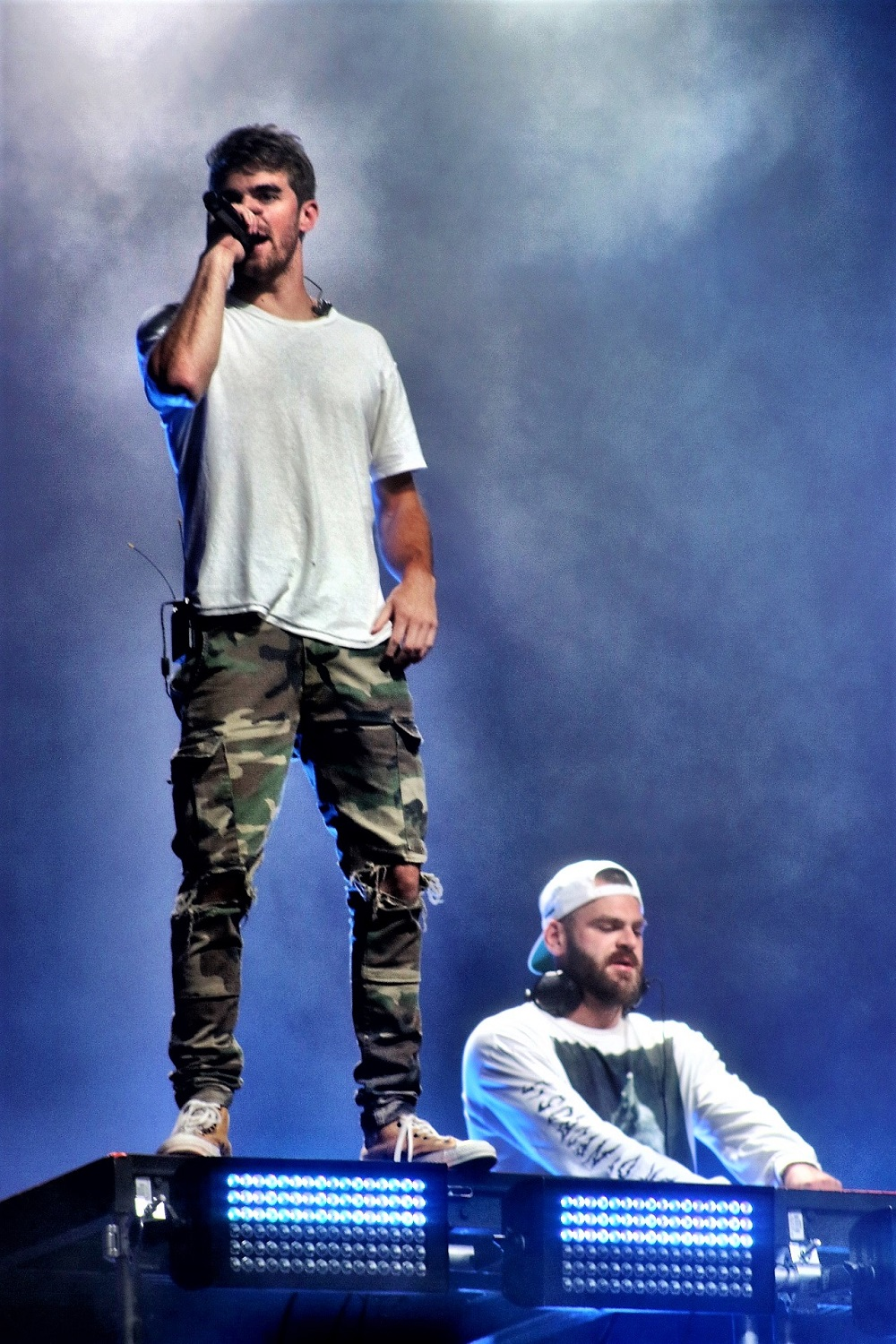
The Chainsmokers performing at Grandoozy in 2018

On November 1, 2018, it was announced that the Chainsmokers were scheduled to perform during the Victoria's Secret fashion show which will be recorded in New York City in November, and will be telecasted on December 2 by the ABC network. On November 16, they released "Beach House" as a single.

The duo launched a film production company named Kick the Habit Productions, with their manager Adam Alpert as CEO and Dan Marcus, a former digital media agent, as COO and president. They said "We are beyond thrilled to have launched Kick the Habit Productions as we continue to bridge the gap between our overall artistic vision, the entertainment industry as a whole and our fans. The age of being only a musician is over and we're excited to go all-in on this venture to curate, produce and create meaningful projects." The first project which Kick the Habit Productions will be producing is a movie titled Paris and the screenplay writer is Mickey Rapkin who was inspired by the Chainsmokers' multi-platinum hit song.

On December 14, 2018, the duo released their second studio album titled Sick Boy, featuring ten songs released each month in that year. The final single from the album, "Hope", a collaboration with Winona Oak, was released on the same day.

=== 2019: World War Joy ===
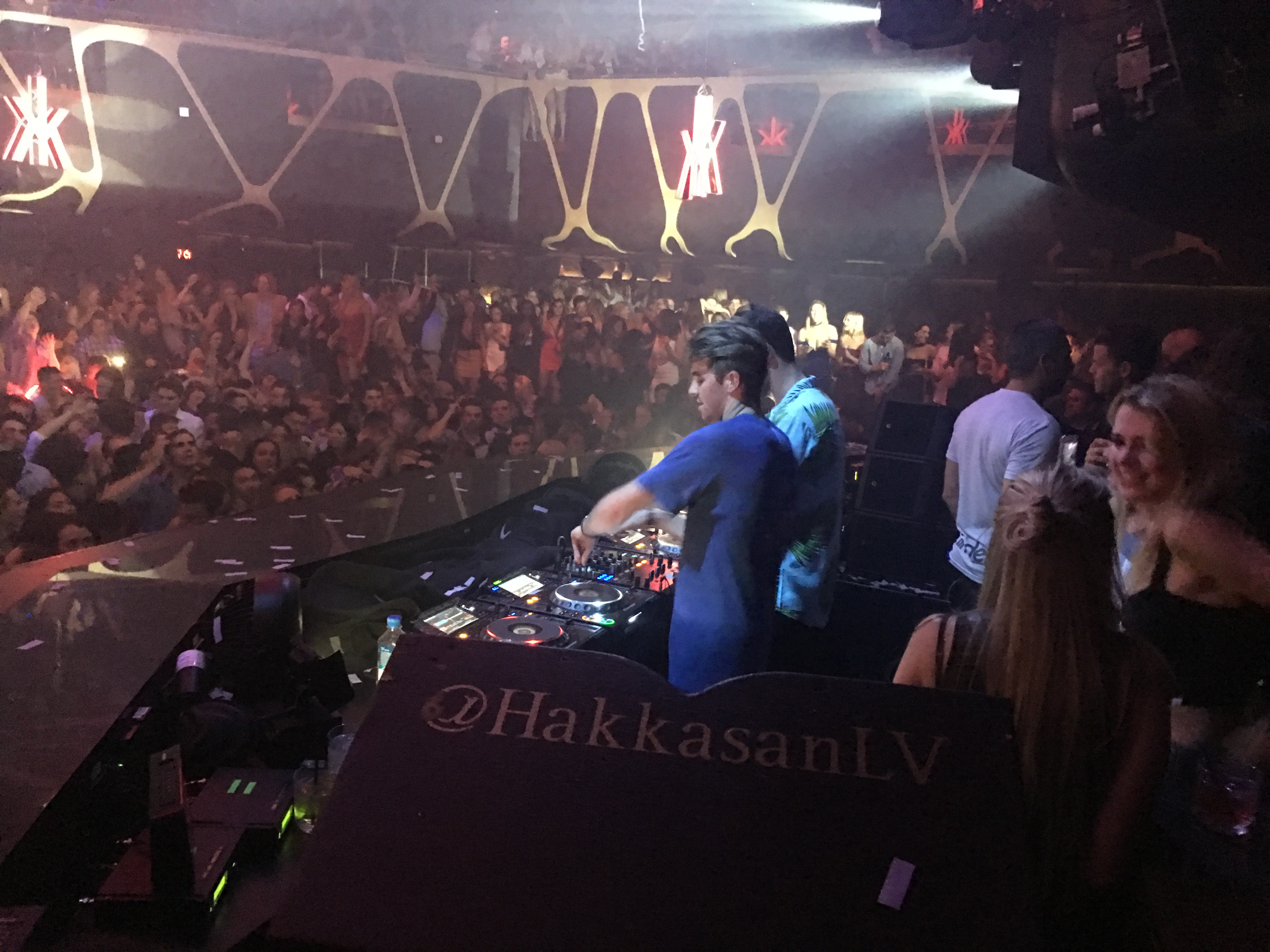
The Chainsmokers performing at the Hakkasan Night Club in Las Vegas in 2019

The duo released the single "Who Do You Love", a collaboration with Australian band 5 Seconds of Summer, on February 7, 2019. The lyric video was released on the same day on YouTube. The song was certified 2× platinum in Canada and platinum in the US and is the most successful single from the Chainsmokers' third album, World War Joy. They also announced a 41-city North American tour with 5 Seconds of Summer, taking place September 2019 through December 2019. On March 29, 2019, the Chainsmokers released the single "Kills You Slowly".

The duo performed at the 2019 Ultra Music Festival Australia, a two-day festival held in Sydney and Melbourne in February. They also closed out the mainstage at the 2019 Ultra Music Festival Miami, a three-day festival held in March. They also headlined Day 1 of Lollapalooza 2019, a four-day festival held in August in Chicago, where they debuted their new fully live setup they'll be using on their upcoming World War Joy Tour, consisting of keyboards, drum pads and samplers.

=== 2020–2021: Hiatus ===
On February 24, 2020, the duo announced that they would take a hiatus from social media in order to focus on their "next chapter in music". The Chainsmokers began teasing their eventual return after completing their fourth studio album, occasionally breaking their social media fast to post promotional material for the upcoming album and reiterate that they were continuously working on the project.

==== Safe & Sound charity concert ====
On July 14, 2020, after having largely isolated themselves since the social media hiatus and the COVID-19 pandemic, the duo announced plans to hold a "drive-in" charity concert, "Safe & Sound", on July 25, as their first in-person concert since January 2020 prior to Super Bowl LIV. The concert was presented by Jerry Media's Tequila brand JAJA, which is co-owned by the Chainsmokers. The concert was stated to be a "socially-distanced drive-in show to benefit the charities No Kid Hungry, Southampton Fresh Air Home, and the Children's Medical Fund of New York" and was meant to be a future example of COVID-19 pandemic concert audience safety. On July 25, 2020, the Chainsmokers and Goldman Sachs' CEO, David Solomon, who produces EDM under the stage name DJ D-Sol, headlined the charity concert in Southampton, New York. The event was stated to follow guidelines issued by the CDC in order to prevent the spread of COVID-19, including attendees being required to take temperature checks for 14 days prior to the event and when entering, being provided with complementary face masks, and instructed to remain within the vicinity of their parked vehicle unless using a restroom. At the time of the concert, the state of New York prohibited non-essential gatherings of more than 50 people. However, footage from the event on social media seemingly showed a large crowd of attendees in a mosh pit, which would have been in violation of social distancing recommendations. The concert received backlash from social media users who pointed out that images and videos posted by the concert-goers did not promote social distancing as the concert promoters had initially stated. The event was investigated by the state of New York health authorities for "rampant" violations of social distancing guidelines.

On July 27, 2020, Governor of New York Andrew Cuomo criticized the "egregious" violations of social distancing requirements present at the event, and announced that the New York State Department of Health would conduct an investigation. Its commissioner Howard Zucker questioned how the town of Southampton believed the event "was legal and not an obvious public health threat". A representative of the venue told BuzzFeed News that the mosh pit did contain a mixture of steel and retractable barriers to divide it, and that security was present to enforce the boundaries and mask requirements.

In October 2020, the state fined the event organizers, In the Know Experiences, $20,000 for holding a non-essential event and failing to enforce health guidelines such as wearing masks.

==== Words on Bathroom Walls ====
During their hiatus, the group also scored the soundtrack for the film Words on Bathroom Walls. The film was released on August 21, 2020, and features soundtrack music scored by the group, alongside previous releases "Push My Luck", "Somebody", alongside an additional song, "If Walls Could Talk".

=== 2022–2023: So Far So Good and Summertime Friends ===
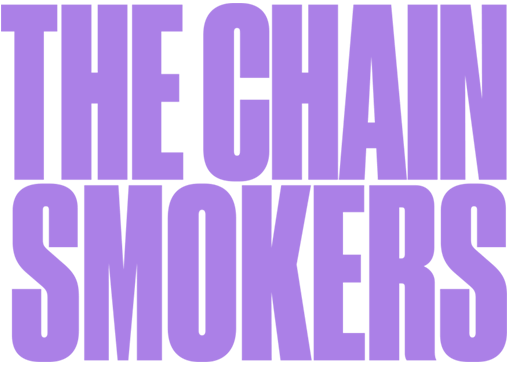
Logo since 2022

On January 5, 2022, the duo released their first new music in two years on their SoundCloud page – a remix of Bon Iver's cover of "I Can't Make You Love Me" by Bonnie Raitt alongside a remix of The Anxiety's 2020 single "Meet Me at Our Spot".

On January 24, 2022, the Chainsmokers announced the lead single "High" from their fourth studio album. The song was released on January 28, 2022. The second single "iPad" was released March 11, 2022. On April 6, 2022, the duo announced that their fourth studio album, So Far So Good, would be released on May 13, 2022. A third pre-release single from the album, "Riptide", was released on April 22, 2022.

On May 17, 2022, the Chainsmokers distributed 5,000 NFTs that give rights to streaming royalties from So Far So Good to fans. On July 22, the duo released the deluxe edition of the album, which included the singles "The Fall" with DJ duo Ship Wrek, "Why Can't You Wait" with electronic duo Bob Moses, and "Time Bomb".

On April 21, 2023, the Chainsmokers released the song "Up & Down", followed by "Self Destruction Mode" and "See You Again" featuring ILLENIUM in June, "Celular" and "My Bad" in July and lastly, "Summertime Friends" and "Jungle" in September. They released their fifth studio album titled Summertime Friends on October 20, 2023. The cover art for the EP was inspired by Wong Kar-Wai's 1995 film Fallen Angels. In 2023, the Chainsmokers collaborated with Japanese rock star Yoshiki to perform a classical version of "Closer" in the documentary film Yoshiki: Under the Sky.

=== 2024–present: No Hard Feelings, Breathe and Love Is Kind ===
On March 29, 2024, the Chainsmokers released the song "Addicted", a collaboration with Brazilian producer Zerb, and featuring Ink, followed by "Friday", a collaboration with Fridayy on April 26, 2024, "Bad Advice", a collaboration with Welsh-Canadian ELIO, "Tennis Court", "Green Light" on May 10, 2024, "No Shade At Pitti" on May 15, 2024. They released an EP titled No Hard Feelings on May 10, 2024.

On July 11, 2025, the Chainsmokers released the song "White Wine & Adderall", a collaboration with Dutch producer Beau Nox, followed by "Helium", a collaboration with Canadian Singer Anna Sofia on August 15, 2025 and lastly "Spaces", a collaboration with German producer Bunt, and featuring Izzy Bizu on September 5, 2025 and "Smooth", on September 19, 2025. They released an EP titled Breathe on October 24, 2025, with four new songs, the self-titled song "Breathe"; "Veins" a collaboration with Daya; "Air", a collaboration with Absolutely; and "The Cure".

On November 25, 2025, the Chainsmokers released a remix of Taylor Swift's "The Fate of Ophelia." On December 31, they released the remixes of Sombr's "Back To Friends", Jungle's "Back on 74", and EsDeeKid's "4 Raws". This last one was the subject of criticism from EsDeeKid and its community, forcing The Chainsmokers to remove this remix from YouTube and Soundcloud.

On March 25, 2026, American DJ and producer John Summit collaborated with the Chainsmokers and Ilsey for the song "All The Time", the fifth single of Summit's sophomore album "Cntrl Escape." Late on April 10, the Chainsmokers collaborated with Oaks for their single "Echo." Their five-song EP with Oaks, Love Is Kind, was released on May 8.

On August 21, 2026, the Chainsmokers released "Inundauswendig," a joint single with German rapper Makko. On October 13, the duo announced that they had parted ways with Disruptor Records and Columbia Records after 11 years, becoming independent artists. They released "Baby" on October 16 as their first independent release.

== Musical style ==
Taggart has described the duo's music as "blurring the lines between indie, pop music, dance music, and hip-hop." The pair have cited Pharrell Williams, Linkin Park, and Deadmau5 as musical influences. Acts who have inspired the Chainsmokers' songs include Blink-182, Taking Back Sunday, Taylor Swift, Max Martin, The xx, Beach House, and Explosions in the Sky.

Despite their commercial success, the duo has faced criticism and ridicule from some quarters for their "Silicon Valley bro" vibe. Billboard has referred to them as "two of the most ridiculed artists in mainstream music," while The New York Times has described them as "easily loathed", Pitchfork, in an early review, mocked the duo for their "full-throated support to the tech bro lifestyle" and their use of Silicon Valley buzzwords such as "iterating", "disrupting", and "return on investment".

== Members ==
Alexander "Alex" Pall was born on May 16, 1985 (age 41). He shares the role of producer and DJ alongside Andrew Taggart, performing programming, mixing and mastering songs. He also co-writes and plays the piano on some songs. According to Billboard magazine, Pall was raised in Westchester County, New York as the "son of an art dealer and a stay-at-home mom."

Andrew "Drew" Taggart, born December 31, 1989 (age 36), was raised in Freeport, Maine. He shares the role of producer and DJ alongside Alex Pall, performing programming, mixing and mastering. He is the band's primary songwriter, and performs vocals and guitar on some songs. His mother is a teacher and his father sold prosthetics. He got into electronic dance music at the age of 15 while abroad in Argentina, where he was introduced to the music of David Guetta, Daft Punk and Trentemøller.

Matt McGuire is the group's drummer and music director for live shows, and currently performs with them when they go on tour. McGuire also frequently appears alongside the duo in various music videos.

In 2019, Pall and Taggart started Mantis VC, a venture capital firm, raising a total of $110 million in 2020 and 2021. Mantis primarily invests in B2B startup companies. Some of their investments include the cybersecurity firm Chainguard, mobile security company iVerify, social commerce platform Whop.com, investment management platform Public.com, and AI research platform Pogo.

== Discography ==
- Memories...Do Not Open (2017)
- Sick Boy (2018)
- World War Joy (2019)
- So Far So Good (2022)
- Summertime Friends (2023)

== Tours ==
- The #Selfie Tour (2014)
- King of Me Tour (2014)
- Friend Zone Tour (2015–2016)
- Memories Do Not Open Tour (2017–2018)
- World War Joy Tour with 5 Seconds of Summer and Lennon Stella (2019)
- So Far So Good Tour (2022)
- Higher Education College Tour (2026)

== See also ==
- List of awards and nominations received by the Chainsmokers
