= Disruptor Records =

American record label; subsidiary of Sony

- Parent company: Sony Music Entertainment (SME)
- Founded: September 2014; 12 years ago
- Founder: Adam Alpert (CEO)
- Genre: Various
- Country of origin: United States
- Location: New York City, New York
- Official website: disruptorrecords.com

Disruptor Records is an American record label founded by Adam Alpert in September 2014, as a joint venture with Sony Music Entertainment. The label has sold more than 15 million singles worldwide as of 2016.

== History ==
Alpert founded the label in 2014, alongside his clients' musical group The Chainsmokers, whom he also helped to form by introducing the members, Andrew Taggart and Alex Pall in 2012. The Chainsmokers released several chart-topping songs with the label such as "Closer", "Paris", and "Something Just Like This".

Alpert said, "We care about the artist’s career as a whole and not just about the records — that’s the foundation upon which Disruptor was built." In 2014, he signed the joint venture with Sony Music Entertainment CEO Doug Morris, who was replaced by Rob Stringer and launched Disruptor Records, Disruptor Management and Selector Songs.

The name "Disruptor" as described by Alpert, is "about shaking things up". The label would focus on the long-term development of artists through artist-to-fan communication.

== Disruptor Records roster ==
- The Chainsmokers
- Dove Cameron
- Ritt Momney
- Christian French
- Emmy Meli
- Lost Kings
- Slush Puppy
- Dava

== Disruptor Management roster ==
- The Chainsmokers
- Jessie Murph
- Dove Cameron
- Gashi
- Don Diablo
- Lost Kings
- Maude Latour
- Young Bombs
- Nate Sib
