= K?d =

American electronic musician and DJ (born 1997)

- Also known as: glitch boy; kid; Doggun
- Born: Patrick Cybulski; April 19, 1997 (age 29)
- Origin: Miami, Florida
- Genre: Electronic
- Occupations: Record producer; DJ
- Instrument: Digital audio workstation
- Years active: 2015–present
- Labels: Ultra; Big Beat; PRMD; HARD; Monstercat; Nightmode; Ophelia; Wall; Only Delusions; Trillers; Too Lush; ICON; Moving Castle; brednbutter
- Website: whoskid.com

Patrick Cybulski (born April 19, 1997), known by his stage name K?d (pronounced "kid"), is an American electronic musician and DJ. He is known for his single "Lose Myself" (featuring Phil Good), which charted on the US Billboard Dance/Mix Show Airplay at #40, as well as his single "Distance" (featuring Blair), which peaked at #16 on the aforementioned chart. He is also known for his remixes of popular electronic songs, most significantly "Doin' It Right" (feat. Panda Bear) by Daft Punk and "Renaissance" (featuring Clairity) by Steve James. Cybulski has performed at numerous festivals including Lollapalooza, Bonnaroo, EDC, Electric Zoo, Nocturnal Wonderland, Beyond Wonderland, Life in Color, and BUKU Music + Art Project, and has toured in North America, Europe, Asia and Oceania.

== Career ==
=== 2015: Early releases ===
On April 9, 2015, Cybulski released the single "Nova Vita" under the name "Doggun" on the label Jaba Recordings. Later that month, on April 25, he would release on the label again with the song "The Cove", this time under the name "kid".

On May 18, Cybulski released the single "Gold Blood" on the record label Only Delusions. A month later, on June 25, Cybulski released a second single "Space Cowboy" on the same label.

On July 9, Cybulski released the single "Bits & Pieces" as a collaboration with Kuiters on the record label Trillers. On July 20, Cybulski released two singles on two different record labels: "Zero Zero" on Onstreet, and "Keepo" on Icon.

On August 1, Cybulski released the track "Paperplane" on the record label Too Lush, as a part of the label's compilation album Too Lush Vol. 4, which also featured falcxne, Kuiters, Buji (James Ivy), Boba Sweat and Celadon City (Academy Garden). On August 24, Cybulski self-released the single "Cardinal" with Kuiters, with whom he had previously collaborated on "Bits & Pieces". The song was promoted by Skrillex's Nest HQ imprint.

On November 11, Cybulski self-released a remix of "The Touch" by KOLAJ. The following month, on December 4, his remix of the Avicii song "Broken Arrows" was featured on the song's remix EP alongside M-22, The Aston Shuffle, and Didrick, and released on PRMD Music and Universal.

=== 2016: Popular remixes ===
On January 6, 2016, Cybulski released his remix of "Renaissance" by Steve James (featuring Clairity). EDMTunes described the remix as "akin to the likes of Zedd or Madeon". Months later, on April 8, the remix would be featured on Steve James' remix package for Renaissance, released through Ultra Music, alongside other remixes of the song from ARMNHMR, Myles Travitz, and Paxel.

On January 29, 2016, Cybulski released a remix of "This Ain't Over" by Alex Newell on Big Beat Records. The remix was featured on Newell's This Ain't Over (Remixes) EP, alongside remixes from Odd Mob, TKDJS, Autolaser, and PVC.

On March 25, 2016, Cybulski released a remix of "Cliff's Edge" by Hayley Kiyoko, which was featured on her remix package for the song alongside ARMNHMR and Lash.

Cybulski released a remix of "Fallen" (feat. Desirée Dawson) by ARMNHMR on April 5, 2016, on Far East Movement's record label brednbutter. One week later, on April 13, Cybulski released a remix of "Red Lips" (featuring Sam Bruno) by GTA. It was around this point that he switched out the 'i' in his alias for his defining question mark (from "kid" to "k?d"). Less than two weeks after "Red Lips," Cybulski released a remix of "What You Need" by The Weeknd on April 26. On May 3, 2016, Cybulski released a remix of "Doin' It Right" by Daft Punk and Panda Bear, then two days later a remix for "Happy" by Annabel Jones on Atlantic Records.

On May 23, 2016, Cybulski released his first original song as k?d, "Somewhere Far Away from Here" featuring the singer Lolaby. The track was praised for its reminiscence to the style of Porter Robinson's Worlds. Following "Somewhere Far Away," Cybulski released another original song, "Show Me," featuring vocalist/rapper Rahn Harper, on June 14.

On June 28, 2016, Cybulski released the single "Amaretto" as a collaboration with Luca Lush. The following month, on July 8, Cybulski appeared on the remix package for "Hey" by FÄIS and Afrojack on Universal alongside remixes from Matisse & Sadko, DubVision, Kronic, Conro, Hellberg and Tom & Jame. Two days later, Cybulski released a remix of "Elevated" by RKCB, which was featured on their remix package for the song. On July 20, Cybulski released a remix of "Youth" by Manila Killa, featuring Satica, which was featured on the song's remix EP alongside a remix from Qrion.

On August 8, 2016, Cybulski released the single "Discover", featuring RKCB, on the record label PRMD Music. The track was premiered by Billboard on release. The song's lyric video was released on August 16, 2016.

Cybulski released a remix of "4AM" by Huntar on August 22, 2016. On September 15, he released the single "Birth of the Universe". He released another single, "Forgotten" on October 6, 2016, which marked the start of his side project glitch boy.

On October 26, 2016, Cybulski released the single "Mortem". The following month, Cybulski released a remix of "Sad Machine" by Porter Robinson on the 7th, and a remix of "We Are Your Friends" by Justice vs. Simian on the 29th. Two weeks later, on December 13, Cybulski released a remix of "It's All On U" by Illenium (featuring Liam O'Donnell). The track was featured on Illenium's remix package for Ashes alongside remixes from Dabin, We Are Fury, Mr FijiWiji, Just A Gent, Kill Paris, William Black, Crystal Skies, T-Mass, LZRD, it's different, and Hazey Eyes.

=== 2017: Charting singles and festivals ===
January 2017 saw Cybulski release "Genesis" on the 3rd and "Vindicta" on the 10th. One month later, Cybulski released "Fourth Impact", a collaboration with REZZ on February 3.

On March 10, 2017, Cybulski performed at BUKU Music + Art Project in New Orleans, alongside Travis Scott, Young Thug, Lil Yachty, 21 Savage, Run The Jewels, Vince Staples, SOPHIE, Clams Casino, Thundercat, Tycho, deadmau5, Zeds Dead, Cashmere Cat, and Car Seat Headrest.

"Lose Myself" with Phil Good was Cybulski's next single, released on March 17 on PRMD Music. It reached #40 on Billboard's Dance Airplay chart, making it his first charting release. On March 25, Cybulski played a set in Miami supporting REZZ, then on April 9 he performed at Phoenix Lights Festival in Phoenix, Arizona, alongside Tiësto, Alesso, Above & Beyond, Illenium, and Oliver Heldens. He also toured with The Chainsmokers in the month of April, supporting their Memories Do Not Open Tour along with Kiiara.

Two singles were released in May, "Glitch Boy" on the 8th, and "Catherine" with Varien on the 31st. Cybulski played a set supporting RL Grime on July 15 in Dallas, then on August 4 he performed at Lollapalooza in Chicago along with Blink-182, Lorde, Justice, Charli XCX, Glass Animals, DJ Snake, Lil Uzi Vert, Migos, Foster the People, Tove Lo, The Killers, Wiz Khalifa, Chance the Rapper, Big Sean, and Muse.

On August 23, Cybulski released "1234" with Medasin. He performed at Breakaway Music Festival on September 2 in Columbus, Ohio along with Playboi Carti, Diplo and Galantis, then Electric Zoo on September 3 in New York City along with Zedd, Eric Prydz and Armin van Buuren. His festival run continued with Nocturnal Wonderland in San Bernardino, California on September 15, playing alongside Dillon Francis, Sub Focus, Excision, Zomboy and Valentino Khan. Around this time he supported REZZ at two stops on her Mass Manipulation Tour in the US and Canada.

His next release was "Distance" on November 7 with Evan Blair on PRMD Music, which peaked at #16 on Billboard's Dance Airplay chart, and then after supporting Tiësto at two stops on the Clublife College Tour he released a remix for "Young" by The Chainsmokers on Columbia Records. It was featured on their remix package for the song on December 15 alongside Deniz Koyu and Midnight Kids. Cybulski rounded out the year with a performance at SnowGlobe Festival in South Lake Tahoe, California on December 30, playing on a lineup with Khalid and Porter Robinson.

=== 2018–2021: Find Paradise EP and Rebirth EP ===
Cybulski's first performance of 2018 was at Life in Color on January 14 in Miami along with Jaden Smith. On March 16 he performed at Beyond Wonderland in San Bernardino along with KSHMR, Chris Lake, FISHER, R3hab and Kill the Noise, and on May 11 he performed at Red Rocks Amphitheatre in Denver, supporting Tchami and Malaa's No Redemption Tour.

Through early 2018, Cybulski continued to release singles on PRMD Music: "Banshee" with Wolfgang Gartner on February 20, "Zero One" on April 16, and "A.I." on June 26. Wolfgang Gartner stated in a press release for "Banshee" that ""K?D finally convinced me to revisit the gritty distorted electro sound that I made my name with a decade ago, and I'm glad he did...This project actually sparked a series of songs in this same vein that I'm looking forward to unleashing on the unsuspecting masses."

From May to August, Cybulski played at several festivals, including EDC on May 20 in Las Vegas with Pendulum, Boys Noize, Martin Garrix, San Holo, Whethan and Svdden Death; Sunset Music Festival on May 26 in Tampa with Marshmello, Virtual Riot and Alan Walker; Bonnaroo on June 7 in Manchester, Tennessee with Dua Lipa, Billie Eilish, Eminem, Bon Iver, Anderson .Paak, Paramore, Broken Social Scene, T-Pain and Denzel Curry; FVDED in the Park on July 6 in Vancouver with Future, Kygo, Brockhampton, Jack Harlow and Kaskade; and Lollapalooza on August 2 in Chicago with The Weeknd, Bruno Mars, Post Malone, Tyler, The Creator, Clairo, Vampire Weekend, Jack White, ODESZA and Gucci Mane.

On October 5, 2018, Cybulski released his six-track debut extended play, Find Paradise through the label Alt:Vision. The EP featured Mickey Kojak and comprised many genres, including dubstep, future bass, drum & bass, hardstyle and industrial techno. Through an emailed statement to Billboard, Cybulski stated that he "did not want to stick to a specific theme for [his] first project" to ensure listeners will not label a specific genre to his name. He continued: "I guess my main goal is to push music to new boundaries, even if it means getting backlash for it."

From September to December, Cybulski went on the Find Paradise Tour organized by Alt:Vision in the United States, Canada and Australia, bringing Dabin, Golden Features, Devault and Drezo with him as support. While in Australia, he performed at The Grass Is Greener Festival on October 27, along with Darude and ShockOne.

Toward the end of the year, in December, Cybulski appeared on RL Grime's remix package for his album Nova on WeDidIt. Cybulski's remix of "Rainer" was featured alongside remixes from Valentino Khan, Anna Lunoe, Eptic, Said The Sky, 1788-L, Quix, Blanke, TYNAN, MYRNE, Hex Cougar, Alexander Lewis, Devault, Montell2099, Enschway, Dabow, Shadient and Wavedash.

In 2019, Cybulski released a live edit of the title track from Find Paradise EP on January 11, a remix of "HAHAHA" by SMF (Wendel Kos) on February 21, a collaboration called "Antidance" on Kayzo's second album Unleashed on August 14, and a second version of his remix of "Doin' It Right" by Daft Punk and Panda Bear on December 10.

In March and April 2019, Cybulski toured in the US and Canada with Kayzo's Unleashed Tour and Slushii's Monster Energy Outbreak Tour. In May he made his live debut in Asia at EDC Japan, on a lineup with Skrillex and Major Lazer. Cybulski toured Europe in June, going to the Netherlands and Spain and performing at Nameless Music Festival in Lecco, Italy along with Benny Benassi, Digitalism, Salvatore Ganacci and The Bloody Beetroots. He continued performing at various festivals, including Global Dance Festival in Denver on July 19; Lollapalooza France in Paris on July 21 along with The Strokes, Twenty One Pilots, Clean Bandit, Bad Bunny and Metric; Chasing Summer in Calgary on August 3; Moonrise Festival in Baltimore on August 10; Das Energi in Magna, Utah on August 16; 88rising's Head in the Clouds Festival in Los Angeles on August 17; New Horizons Festival in Nürburg, Germany on August 24; and Imagine Music Festival in Atlanta on September 20.

Around this time period Cybulski slowed his output, as he began work on his debut album. His only new song in 2020 was a DJ edit of Skrillex's remix of "Sicko Mode" by Travis Scott on October 14. Then on December 4, Cybulski released the compilation EP Rebirth, containing five songs from 2016 to 2017 which had previously been unavailable on streaming services. This EP also received a vinyl printing in October 2021, Cybulski's first physical release.

In 2021 Cybulski debuted on Dim Mak Records in his first collaboration with Steve Aoki, "BIB" on January 15. He played Beyond Wonderland in San Bernardino on August 28 and EDC Las Vegas on October 22, then on December 6, he released a remix of "One Last Kiss" by Hikaru Utada, the theme song for Evangelion: 3.0+1.0 Thrice Upon a Time.

=== 2022: Cage Script ===
Cybulski released his debut album, Cage Script, on HARD Recs on December 9, 2022. The album featured collaborations with Japanese electronic producers Masayoshi Iimori, KOTONOHOUSE and Yadosan, as well as singers June One, Cecilia Gault and RANASOL.

The album's rollout began on February 22, 2022, with the first single, "Return To Nothingness". Four singles followed throughout the year: "Flow In You" with June One on March 18, "If This Is A Dream" on July 1, "Three In The Morning" with Cecilia Gault on September 16, and "Protect Me" with Yadosan on October 21.

During the rollout of the album, Cybulski returned to Dim Mak Records in collaboration with Yadosan on Steve Aoki's remix package for the album Hiroquest: Genesis, on November 11. Their remix of "Stars Don't Shine" was featured alongside remixes from Slushii, TeddyLoid, Kizuna AI, Dimitri Vegas & Like Mike, Brennan Heart, Timmy Trumpet, Quintino, Bassjackers, Prince Fox, Crankdat, Gammer, Riot Ten, Will Sparks, Dr Phunk, Dimatik, Lil Texas, GPF, KAAZE, 22Bullets, Andruss and LICK.

=== 2023–2024: Past Life EP and Monstercat ===
Following the album, Cybulski's first release of 2023 was a single on HARD Recs called "You And Me" on March 10, which received a premiere on UKF. On May 9, Cybulski released a second version of his remix of "Sad Machine" by Porter Robinson, following his original remix from 2016.

On September 28, Cybulski made his debut appearance on Seven Lions' label Ophelia Records, with the song "On My Own" featuring Nevve. This was a single for his EP Past Life, which was then released on November 10.

Cybulski's first release of 2024 was his debut on Nightmode, "Tear Me Down" co-written by Tisoki and Courtney Drummey, which was released on April 5 and received a UKF premiere. Two months later, his next release was the collaboration "Lose My Mind" with Steve Aoki on the album Paragon, released on Dim Mak on June 28.

On November 7, 2024, Cybulski debuted on Monstercat with "Endless In Between", a collaboration with Jonathan Mendelsohn.

== Discography ==
=== Albums ===
List of albums
Title	Details
Cage Script	Released: December 9, 2022; Label: HARD Recs; Formats: Digital download, streaming
End of the Universe	Released: June 18, 2026; Label: Monstercat; Formats: Digital download, streaming

=== Extended plays ===
List of extended plays
Title	Details
Find Paradise	Released: 5 October 2018; Label: Alt:Vision Records; Formats: Digital download, streaming
Rebirth	Released: 4 December 2020; Label: None (self-released); Formats: Vinyl, digital download, streaming
Past Life	Released: 10 November 2023; Label: Ophelia Records; Formats: Digital download, streaming
Listen While Driving Late At Night	Released: 2 February 2025; Label: Nightmode; Formats: Digital download, streaming

=== Singles ===
Title	Year	Charts	Album
Title	Year	US Airplay	Album
"Somewhere Far Away From Here" (featuring Lolaby)	2016	—	Rebirth
"Amaretto" (with Luca Lush)	2016	—	Non-album singles
"Discover" (featuring RKCB)	2016	—	Non-album singles
"Birth of the Universe"	2016	—	Rebirth
"Mortem"	2016	—	Rebirth
"Genesis"	2017	—	Rebirth
"Vindicta"	2017	—	Non-album singles
"Fourth Impact" (with Rezz)	2017	—	Non-album singles
"Lose Myself" (featuring Phil Good)	2017	40	Non-album singles
"Glitch Boy"	2017	—	Rebirth
"Catherine" (with Varien)	2017	—	Non-album singles
"1234" (with Medasin)	2017	—	Non-album singles
"Distance" (featuring Blair)	2017	16	Non-album singles
"Banshee" (with Wolfgang Gartner)	2018	—	Non-album singles
"Zero One"	2018	—	Non-album singles
"A.I."	2018	—	Non-album singles
"BIB" (with Steve Aoki)	2021	—	6OKI - Rave Royale
"Return To Nothingness"	2022	—	Cage Script
"Flow In You" (featuring June One)	2022	—	Cage Script
"If This Is A Dream"	2022	—	Cage Script
"Three In The Morning" (featuring Cecilia Gault)	2022	—	Cage Script
"Protect Me" (with Yadosan)	2022	—	Cage Script
"You And Me"	2023	—	Non-album singles
"On My Own" (featuring Nevve)	2023	—	Past Life EP
"Tear Me Down"	2024	—	Non-album singles
"Endless In Between" (with Jonathan Mendelsohn)	2024	—	Non-album singles
"Afterlife"	2025	—	Non-album singles
"Distant Dreams" (with CHYL)	2025	—	Pretty Race Girl EP
"Fly Away"	2025	—	Non-album singles
"Substance" (with REZZ)	2025	—	As The Pendulum Swings
"Close Your Eyes" (with Jazara)	2026	—	End of the Universe
"Ghost" (with osc444)	2026	—	End of the Universe
"Breathe" (with Nevve)	2026	—	End of the Universe
"—" denotes a recording that did not chart or was not released.

=== Guest Appearances ===
Title	Year	Album
"Antidance" (with Kayzo)	2019	Unleashed
"Lose My Mind" (with Steve Aoki)	2024	Paragon

=== Remixes ===
Title	Year	Original artist(s)	Album
"The Touch"	2015	KOLAJ	Non-album singles
"Broken Arrows"	2015	Avicii	Broken Arrows (Remixes)
"Renaissance" (featuring Clairity)	2016	Steve James	Renaissance (Remixes)
"This Ain't Over"	2016	Alex Newell	This Ain't Over (Remixes)
"Cliffs Edge"	2016	Hayley Kiyoko	Cliff's Edge (Remixes)
"Fallen" (featuring Desiree Dawson)	2016	ARMNHMR	Fallen (The Remixes)
"Red Lips" (featuring Sam Bruno)	2016	GTA	Non-album singles
"What You Need"	2016	The Weeknd	Non-album singles
"Doin' It Right" (featuring Panda Bear)	2016	Daft Punk	Non-album singles
"Elevated"	2016	RKCB	Elevated: The Remixes
"Hey"	2016	Fais & Afrojack	Hey (Remixes)
"Youth" (featuring Satica)	2016	Manila Killa	Youth (Remixes)
"Sad Machine"	2016	Porter Robinson	Non-album singles
"We Are Your Friends" (vs. Simian)	2016	Justice	Non-album singles
"It's All On U" (featuring Liam O'Donnell)	2016	Illenium	Ashes (Remixes)
"Starboy" (featuring Daft Punk)	2016	The Weeknd	Non-album singles
"4AM"	2017	Huntar	Non-album singles
"Young"	2017	The Chainsmokers	Young (Remixes)
"Rainer"	2018	RL Grime	Nova (The Remixes Vol. 1)
"HAHAHA"	2019	SMF	Non-album singles
"Doin' It Right (V2)" (featuring Panda Bear)	2019	Daft Punk	Non-album singles
"Sicko Mode (DJ Tool)"	2020	Skrillex vs. Travis Scott	Non-album singles
"One Last Kiss"	2021	Hikaru Utada	Non-album singles
"Stars Don't Shine" (with Yadosan) (featuring Global Dan)	2022	Steve Aoki	Hiroquest: Genesis Remixed
"Sad Machine (V2)"	2023	Porter Robinson	Non-album singles
