= Zero One (song) =

Single by K?d
- Released: 13 April 2018
- Genre: Hard dance
- Length: 3:08
- Label: PRMD
- Producer: Patrick Cybulski

K?d singles chronology
"Banshee" (2018)	"Zero One" (2018)	"A.I." (2018)

"Zero One" is a song by American electronic musician and DJ K?d. It was released on 13 April 2018 by PRMD Music.

== Critical reception ==
"Zero One" was well received by most critics. Kassi Chrys of Dancing Astronaut praised the song, calling it otherworldly and writing that K?d "continues to produce vibrant, eclectic music that has stolen the hearts of listeners across the world." Your EDM's Matthew Meadow noted that the song seemed to be influenced by French electro and hardcore artists as well as various "classic rave sounds". Writing for Nest HQ, Jordan Mafi noted the song as "completely out of left field for k?d", finalising that the song was an "excellent, innovative direction for k?d." Andre Waguespack of Run the Trap commended the song, calling it a "true raver’s dream" and as a breath of fresh air amongst a large amount of mundane SoundCloud-based electronic music artists. EDM Sauce's Sophia Medina described the song as a "festival worthy" track and that it would become a favourite from the artist, further commenting that the song was an "uplifting single that will surely keep your adrenaline rushing throughout its entirety."

Remixes of "Zero One" also received considerable praise, with Noiseporn's Lennon Cihak describing Voliik & Slooze's remix as an equally "powerful track that pulverises the entire frequency spectrum", further writing that the remix kept K?d's signature sound while "completely placing a unique spin on the original." Brian Bonavoglia of This Song Slaps reviewed Atlast's remix, describing the remix as one that "completely transformed the original into a gritty, menacing barrage of bass."

== Track listing ==
Digital download – Single
No.	Title	Length
1.	"Zero One"	3:08
Total length:		3:08

Digital download – Voliik & Slooze Remix
No.	Title	Length
1.	"Zero One" (Voliik x Slooze Flip)	4:02
Total length:		4:02

Digital download – Atlast Remix
No.	Title	Length
1.	"Zero One" (Atlast Remix)	4:00
Total length:		4:00

== Release history ==
Region	Date	Format	Version	Label	Ref.
Worldwide	13 April 2018	Digital download	Original release	PRMD	
Worldwide	26 April 2018	Digital download	Voliik x Slooze Flip	Self-released	
Worldwide	23 May 2018	Digital download	Atlast Remix	Self-released	
