= For a Better Day =

2015 single by Avicii

Single by Avicii

from the album Stories
- A-side: "Pure Grinding"
- Released: 28 August 2015
- Recorded: 2014
- Studio: Henson Studios
- Length: 3:26
- Label: Universal Music; PRMD
- Songwriters: Tim Bergling; Alex Ebert
- Producer: Avicii

Avicii singles chronology
"Waiting for Love" (2015)	"For a Better Day" / "Pure Grinding" (2015)	"Broken Arrows" (2015)

Music video
- "For A Better Day" on YouTube

"For a Better Day" is a song by Swedish EDM producer Avicii with uncredited vocals by American singer Alex Ebert, released as a single in 2015. The track appears on his album Stories and on his two-track EP Pure Grinding / For a Better Day. It was written by Tim Bergling (Avicii) and Alex Ebert. A music video was produced for the song, which was filmed in Hungary.

In 2021, to accompany the renaming of the Ericsson Globe to the Avicii Arena, the Royal Stockholm Philharmonic Orchestra released a version of "For a Better Day" with Ella Tiritiello on vocals. Arranged and conducted by Erik Arvinder, an accompanying music video was shot showing Tiritiello on the roof of the arena.

== Music video ==
The official music video for "For a Better Day" was released on September 3, 2015. Avicii made his directorial debut by co-directing the video alongside filmmaker Levan Tsikurishvili. Filmed in the summer of 2015 in Hungary, the video stars Swedish actor Krister Henriksson, and tackles the issues of child slavery and child sex trafficking.

All the songs have a story I wanted to tell... The promise of a better life often traps families and children into being used as tools for some of the most despicable people on earth. It's an issue about which I hope to start a louder discussion, especially now with the huge number of families on the move from war torn countries looking for safety and shelter.

— Avicii

The music video is split into three time streams, dealing with child sexual slavery. The video begins with a chauffeured car arriving at a secluded rural location. There, a truck containing black-market goods that are being sold to a half-dozen waiting buyers. Inside the car, a man wearing an expensive suit and wristwatch lights a cigar. His face, and the goods in question, are not seen.

A second time stream is in black and white, depicts a two little girls being chased through a field of dead sunflowers being chased by someone in tactical gear. They come out of the field near a cliff, and jump into the sea below.

The third time stream follows two individuals in skull-masks on a murder-spree targeting the men who purchased from the truck. They brand some of their victims, while permitting others to kill themselves. In each case, the face of the newly deceased is crossed out on a rogues' gallery containing dozens of mugshots.

The third time stream finishes as the two masked individuals make their way through a raucous political demonstration demanding freedom before a government building. Their target is an apparently a powerful political figure immune to the will of the people. His watch and cigar identify him as the man in the car. The duo break in, strip him, brand him, and hang him from the roof by noose—but not before unmasking to reveal themselves as two adult women, whom he recognizes as two abused children in his past.

The first time stream is then replayed with dialog audio instead of music. The "goods" being sold from the truck were children. Two little girls are stuffed into the truck of the political leader's car. (The meaning of the other time streams is then apparent: they had escaped, and returned as adults for revenge.)

In the concluding scene, the branded word is shown to be "pedofilia".

== Track listing ==
- Digital download – Kshmr remix
1. "For a Better Day" (Kshmr remix) – 4:43
- Digital download – remixes
1. "For a Better Day" (DubVision remix) – 4:53
2. "For a Better Day" (Kshmr remix) – 4:43
3. "For a Better Day" (Billon remix) – 6:13

== Charts ==
=== Weekly charts ===
Chart (2015)	Peak position
Australia (ARIA)	51
Austria (Ö3 Austria Top 40)	10
Belgium (Ultratip Bubbling Under Flanders)	3
Belgium (Ultratop 50 Wallonia)	49
Finland (Suomen virallinen lista)	15
France (SNEP)	26
Germany (GfK)	18
Hungary (Dance Top 40)	5
Hungary (Rádiós Top 40)	1
Hungary (Single Top 40)	2
Hungary (Stream Top 40)	12
Ireland (IRMA)	60
Italy (FIMI)	39
Japan Hot 100 (Billboard)	45
Netherlands (Dutch Top 40)	17
Netherlands (Single Top 100)	22
Norway (VG-lista)	15
Poland Airplay (ZPAV)	6
Poland Dance (ZPAV)	35
Slovakia Airplay (ČNS IFPI)	48
Slovenia (SloTop50)	25
Spain (Promusicae)	50
Sweden (Sverigetopplistan)	5
Switzerland (Schweizer Hitparade)	16
UK Singles (Official Charts)	68
US Hot Dance/Electronic Songs (Billboard)	17

=== Year-end charts ===
Chart (2015)	Position
Hungary (Dance Top 40)	60
Hungary (Rádiós Top 40)	24
Hungary (Single Top 40)	34
Netherlands (Dutch Top 40)	90
Netherlands (NPO 3FM)	92
Sweden (Sverigetopplistan)	84
US Hot Dance/Electronic Songs (Billboard)	70
Chart (2016)	Position
Hungary (Dance Top 40)	25

== Certifications ==
Region	Certification	Certified units/sales
Brazil (Pro-Música Brasil)	Platinum	60,000^{‡}
Germany (BVMI)	Gold	200,000^{‡}
Italy (FIMI)	Gold	25,000^{‡}
New Zealand (RMNZ)	Gold	15,000^{‡}
Poland (ZPAV)	Platinum	20,000^{‡}
Sweden (GLF)	2× Platinum	80,000^{‡}
United Kingdom (BPI)	Silver	200,000^{‡}
^{‡} Sales+streaming figures based on certification alone.

== Release history ==
List of release dates, showing region, formats, label and reference
Region	Date	Format(s)	Label	Ref.
United States	September 8, 2015	Contemporary hit radio	Republic Records	
