= Lose Myself (song) =

Single by K?D featuring Phil Good
- Released: March 17, 2017
- Recorded: 2016–2017
- Genre: Future bass; progressive house
- Length: 3:50
- Label: ICONS; PRMD
- Songwriter(s): Patrick Cybulski, Justin Gammella, Jack Tremaine Jones, Maldonado Jared Ikaika Ryan, Chizzy Stephens II
- Producer(s): K?d

"Lose Myself" is a song by future bass producer K?D. It features singer Phil Good. It was released via PRMD Music.

== Background ==
The song features drums alongside a pulsing bass line and Good’s vocals. The production incorporates elements of house and future bass.

== Chart history ==
Chart	Peak position
US Billboard Dance/Mix Show Airplay	40
