= Pure Grinding =

2015 single by Avicii

Single by Avicii

from the album Stories
- A-side: "For a Better Day"
- Released: 28 August 2015
- Genre: R&B; trap
- Length: 2:51
- Label: PRMD; Universal Music
- Songwriters: Tim Bergling; Albin Nedler; Earl Johnson; Kristoffer Fogelmark
- Producers: Avicii; Albin Nedler; Kristoffer Fogelmark

Avicii singles chronology
"Waiting for Love" (2015)	"Pure Grinding" / "For a Better Day" (2015)	"Broken Arrows" (2015)

Music video
- "Avicii - Pure Grinding" on YouTube

"Pure Grinding" is a song by Avicii, released as a single in 2015. The track appears on his album Stories and on his two-track EP Pure Grinding / For a Better Day. It was written by Tim Bergling (Avicii), Kristoffer Fogelmark, Albin Nedler and Earl Johnson. The song was previously leaked on the Internet with the title "Nothing to Lose". It features uncredited vocals from Earl St. Clair. It is also part of the official soundtrack for Need for Speed (2015).

== Reception ==
"Pure Grinding" received mixed-to-positive reviews from critics. Will Hermes of Rolling Stone described the song as "duty-free trap music cut with polyester funk", while Marcus Dowling of Insomniac noted that a "more power synth- and heavy drop-loving producer" would have benefited the song.

== Music video ==
The music video, directed by Avicii and Levan Tsikurishvili, was released on September 3, 2015. The video delivers a powerful message about the struggles of financial survival and the unpredictability of fate. It compares the lives of two men. One man works hard at a limestone quarry, to pay off his overdue bills. When he gets home, he was met with an argumentative wife (or mother) on the overdue bills who ultimately leaves him. Determined, he continues working tirelessly and eventually succeeds in paying the overdue bills.

On the other hand, the other man lives in a life of luxury, fueled by his criminal and gangsterism activities. They kill a gas station owner and later rob a bank. When the sirens go off, his cronies lock him in the bank's safe with a pile of the diamonds and money that he used to fuel his lifestyle.

== Charts ==
Chart (2015)	Peak position
Austria (Ö3 Austria Top 40)	71
Germany (GfK)	94
Sweden (Sverigetopplistan)	19
US Hot Dance/Electronic Songs (Billboard)	30

== Certifications ==
Region	Certification	Certified units/sales
Denmark (IFPI Danmark)	Gold	45,000^{‡}
Sweden (GLF)	Platinum	8,000,000^{†}
^{‡} Sales+streaming figures based on certification alone.^{†} Streaming-only figures based on certification alone.
