= Paradiso Festival =

American music festival

- Genre: Electronic dance music
- Locations: The Gorge Amphitheatre, Quincy, Washington, United States
- Years active: 2012–2019
- Founders: USC Events, Live Nation Entertainment
- Attendance: 20,000+
- Website: Paradiso Festival website

Paradiso Festival was an annual electronic dance music (EDM) festival held at The Gorge Amphitheatre located on the Columbia River in George, Washington, United States. Founded by USC Events and Live Nation Entertainment in 2012, Paradiso was billed as the "largest Electronic Dance Music event ever staged in the Pacific Northwest", with the 2012 attendance exceeding 29,000 people. The 2013 event saw performances by Kaskade, Porter Robinson, Tiesto, and more.

On January 28, 2020 Insomniac filed a lawsuit against USC Events alleging that USC refused to account for $2 million meant for artists and vendors at the 2019 festival. Insomniac has expressed interest in having a summer event at the Gorge which will likely replace Paradiso.

== USC Events ==
A Seattle Washington-based Events company founded in 1996. USC has been silent and has not hosted any events since 2019. Alongside Paradiso, USC also hosted a few other festivals, including Freaknight, Lucky, and Resolution to name a few. After many vendors, employees, and artists failed to receive payment in 2019 for Paradiso it placed pressure on the company who eventually went under.

== Camping ==
Attendants of the Paradiso Festival also had an option to camp at The Gorge Amphitheatre. While the festival itself was two days long, camping traditionally began a day before the festival started. At the 2017 festival, camping was open to everyone at 1 p.m. PST. There were four types of camping an attendant could buy: Standard Camping, Premier Camping, Gold Camping, and Terrace Camping. The Standard Camping pass was the cheapest option, while the Terrace Camping pass was the most expensive. Each campground had its own perks, with the perks getting better as one purchased a more expensive camping pass. Campers were normally permitted one vehicle and six people per camp site. There were vendors for food and misc. items such as clothing and artist merchandise, as well as showers towards the middle of the camp grounds. There were Porta Potty/Handwashing stations, and trash cans located throughout the campgrounds.

== Culture ==
Attendants could expect to see costumes and outfits that are catered to the EDM industry, such as vibrantly colored clothing. Many attendants were also representative of the PLUR movement. Art was also a centerpiece at the festival, with festivalgoers finding many different artistic displays throughout the festival grounds. Many of the performances represented EDM, but within the genre itself there was a wide spectrum of sounds that were then categorized into various subgenres. Some examples commonly found were house music and trap music.

== The Festival ==
Attendants could expect to be searched and patted down upon entry to the festival for illegal substances and alcohol. In the actual festival area, attendants could find vendors for food and drinks. Other vendors sold accessories, clothing, and assorted miscellaneous items. There were carnival rides and carnival games for those who were interested. Hydration stations and Porta Potties were set up almost everywhere within the area. There were also people who walked around looking out for those who need help, called the "Conscious Crew". There were medical tents for those in need. There were three total stages, with three artists playing simultaneously, with attendants often going back and forth between artists until their sets were over. At night, the main stage was typically where major artists would play. Several headliners from the 2017 festival included Yellow Claw and Marshmello. Attendants could expect to see light shows and lasers at the various stages throughout the night.

== Line-Ups ==
2016 Line-Up	2017 Line-Up	2018 Line-Up	2019 Line-Up
12th Planet	Alan Walker	AC Slater	1788-L
4B	Alix Perezdick	Armin Van Buuren	Alison Wonderland
Alison Wonderland	Andy C	Audien	ARMNHMR
Aly & Fila	Anna Lunoe	AutoGraF	Bear Grillz
Andrew Rayel	Baauer	Axel Boy	Benny Benassi
Astrix	Barely Alive	Brohug	Bingo Players
Audien	Ben Nicky	Captain Hook	Blanke
Bassjackers	Bijou	Claude Vonstroke	Borgeous
Bassnectar	Billy Kenny	Dada Life	Born Dirty
Bear Grillz	Black Tiger Sex Machine	Daktyl	Coone
Bro Safari	Bleep Bloop	Darren Styles	Dateless B2B Lucati
BT	Boombox Cartel	Darrius	Delta Heavy B2B Dirtyphonics
Cash Cash	Breathe Carolina	Deadmau5	Doctor P
Caspa B2B Rusko	Camo & Krooked	DJ Snake	Elephante
Cazzette	Chris Lake	Drezo	Eli Brown
Cheat Codes	Darrius	Droeloe	Emok
Chris Lorenzo	Doctor P	Ekali	Fury + MC Dino
Cookie Monsta B2B Funtcase	Dyro	Elephante	Gammer
Cosmic Gate	Flux Pavilion	Eptic B2B Must Die!	Getter
Darksiderz	Fury	Feed Me	GG Magree
Datsik	Gammer	Fury + MC Dino	Goldfish
Deorro	Gareth Emery	G Jones	Habstrakt
Destructo	Getter	Gabriel & Dresde	Herobust
Dillon Francis	Griz	Ganja White Night	i_o
Dirtyphonics	Gryffin	Gramatik	Illenium
Dom Dolla	GTA	Graves	Infected Mushroom
Drezo	Johnny Monsoon	Grum	Kaskade
DVBBS	Joyryde	Hal-V & Spacecase	Kayzo
Ephwurd	JSTJR	Hotel Garuda	Keys N Krates
Excision	K?D	Jake Crocker	Klingande
Fury + MC Dino	Kayzo	Justin Martin	Kuuro
Go Freek	Keys N Krates	Jvmpkicks	Lick
Gorgon City (DJ Set)	KSHMR	Kai Wachi	Low Steppa
Hardwell	Lane 8	Kidnap	Markus Schulz
Herobust	Le Youth	Lady Faith	Morgan Page
Hucci	Lost Kings	Louis The Child	Noisecontrollers
Hunter Siegel	Marlo	Matroda	Oliver Heldens
Illenium	Marshmello	Medasin	Omnom
Jackal	Mija	Megalodon B2B Krimer	Opiuo
Jauz	Oliver Heldens	Midnight Trannosaurus	Phantoms
Jay Hardaway	Omnia	Minnesota B2B BuKu	PhaseOne
KRNE	Ookay	Moksi	Riot Ten
LNY TNZ	Porter Robinson	Monxx B2b P0gman	Rusko
Madeon (DJ Set)	Prince Fox	Moon Boots	S.P.Y
Matrix & Futurebound	Quix	Netsky	San Holo
MK (Marc Kinchen)	Rabbit In the Moon	Noisia	Shades
New World Punk	Sam Feldt	Party Favor	Shiba San
NGHTMRE	SayMyName	Paul Van Dyk	Skrillex
Orjan Nilsen	Seven Lions	Pendulum	Slumberjack
Oski	Slander	Planet of the Drums	SNBRN
Peking Duk	Snails	Rezz	Tails
Rezz	SNBRN	Said The Sky	Taska Black
RL Grime	Space Jesus	Snails	Tokimonsta
Shaun Frank	Spag Heddy	Sonny Fodera	Troyboi
Sigala	Sub Focus	Subset Feat. Ammo	Two Friends
Sleepy Tom	Tiësto	Subsonic Drops	Volac
Styles&Complete	Troyboi	Tchami x Malaa	Walker & Royce
Terravita	Tydi	The Crystal Method	What So Not
The Chainsmokers	Vini Vici	Tollefson	Whethan
Thomas Jack	Virtual Riot	Troyboi	Zeds Dead
Timmy Trumpet	Wax Motif	Um..	Zhu
Ummet Ozcan	Will Sparks	Valentino Khan	
What So Not	Yellow Claw	Virtual Self	
	Zeds Dead		
	Zomboy		

== See also ==
- List of electronic music festivals
