= The Nights =

2014 single by Avicii

Single by Avicii

from the EP The Days / Nights
- Released: 17 November 2014
- Recorded: 2014
- Genre: Progressive house; folktronica
- Length: 2:56
- Label: PRMD; Universal
- Songwriters: Tim Bergling; Nicholas Furlong; Gabriel Benjamin; Jordan Suecof; John Feldmann
- Producers: Avicii; Arash Pournouri

Avicii singles chronology
"Divine Sorrow" (2014)	"The Nights" (2014)	"Waiting for Love" (2015)

"The Nights" is a song by Swedish DJ and record producer Avicii, featuring uncredited vocals from singer/songwriter Nicholas Furlong. It was initially released as an audio video on Avicii's official YouTube channel on December 1 2014. The song was later released by PRMD Music and Universal Island on Avicii's The Days / Nights EP on 1 December 2014, and subsequently on 11 January 2015 in the United Kingdom. The song peaked at number six on the UK Singles Chart and number one on the UK Dance Chart. On 23 January 2015, Avicii released "The Nights (Avicii by Avicii)", his own remix of the song. The song appears on the UK version of Avicii's second studio album Stories (2015).

== Background ==
Furlong noted that he began writing the song as an ode to his father. The inspiration for the "pirate-y fight song" sound came to him while at a bar in Ireland. Furlong sent the original idea, titled "My Father Told Me", to Arash Pournouri, Avicii's manager. Pournouri recognised an immediate draw to the track, saying that the song had that same sense of euphoria which characterises so much of Avicii's music. In an interview with Yahoo! Music, Pournouri said: "It made absolute sense to work on it with Nick...[Avicii and I just needed] to make it more 'us' and that's what [we] did."

== Music video ==
On 15 December 2014, the official music video for "The Nights" was released on YouTube. The video was produced, directed by, and stars "professional life liver" Rory Kramer, who filmed an exuberant recollection of his own life on roller coasters, surfing, snowboarding, skateboarding, balloon flying, as well as making a four-door convertible out of a Toyota.

== Credits and personnel ==
Recording

- Recorded at Foxy Studios, Los Angeles, California

Personnel

- Songwriting – Nicholas Furlong, Gabriel Benjamin, Jordan Suecof, John Feldmann, Avicii
- Production – Avicii
- Co-production – Arash Pournouri
- Vocals – Nicholas Furlong
- Engineering and vocal production – Zakk Cervini
- Acoustic guitar – Colin Brittain
- Lap steel guitar – Will Carter
- Live drums – Jordan Suecof
- Additional vocals – The Mighty Riot

== Charts ==
=== Weekly charts ===
Weekly chart performance for "The Nights"
Chart (2014–2026)	Peak position
Australia (ARIA)	9
Austria (Ö3 Austria Top 40)	6
Belgium (Ultratop 50 Flanders)	14
Belgium (Ultratop 50 Wallonia)	29
Canada Hot 100 (Billboard)	43
CIS Airplay (TopHit)	22
Czech Republic Airplay (ČNS IFPI)	2
Czech Republic Singles Digital (ČNS IFPI)	9
Denmark (Tracklisten)	22
Finland (Suomen virallinen lista)	6
France (SNEP)	79
Germany (GfK)	19
Global 200 (Billboard)	168
Hungary (Rádiós Top 40)	33
Hungary (Dance Top 40)	8
Hungary (Single Top 40)	13
Ireland (IRMA)	7
Italy (FIMI)	19
Japan Hot 100 (Billboard)	48
Lebanon (Lebanese Top 20)	18
Netherlands (Dutch Top 40)	19
Netherlands (Single Top 100)	20
New Zealand (Recorded Music NZ)	12
Norway (VG-lista)	3
Poland Airplay (ZPAV)	4
Poland Dance (ZPAV)	36
Portugal (AFP)	46
South Korea (Circle)	164
Slovakia Airplay (ČNS IFPI)	22
Slovakia Singles Digital (ČNS IFPI)	66
Slovenia (SloTop50)	10
Spain (Promusicae)	17
Sweden (Sverigetopplistan)	2
Switzerland (Schweizer Hitparade)	17
UK Singles (Official Charts)	6
UK Dance (Official Charts)	1
US Hot Dance/Electronic Songs (Billboard)	10
US Dance Club Songs (Billboard)	3

2025 weekly chart performance
Chart (2025)	Peak position
Finland Airplay (Radiosoittolista)	86

2026 weekly chart performance
Chart (2026)	Peak position
Finland Airplay (Radiosoittolista)	71

=== Year-end charts ===
2015 year-end chart performance for "The Nights"
Chart (2015)	Position
Australia (ARIA)	45
Austria (Ö3 Austria Top 40)	49
Belgium (Ultratop Flanders)	59
Belgium (Ultratop Wallonia)	96
CIS (Tophit)	39
France (SNEP)	162
Germany (Official German Charts)	81
Hungary (Dance Top 40)	33
Hungary (Single Top 40)	70
Italy (FIMI)	59
Netherlands (Single Top 100)	61
New Zealand (Recorded Music NZ)	41
Poland (ZPAV)	45
Russia Airplay (Tophit)	42
Slovenia (SloTop50)	24
Spain (PROMUSICAE)	56
Sweden (Sverigetopplistan)	31
Switzerland (Schweizer Hitparade)	61
UK Singles (Official Charts Company)	30
Ukraine Airplay (Tophit)	67
US Hot Dance/Electronic Songs (Billboard)	21

2021 year-end chart performance for "The Nights"
Chart (2021)	Position
Portugal (AFP)	150

2022 year-end chart performance for "The Nights"
Chart (2022)	Position
Global Excl. US (Billboard)	147

2024 year-end chart performance for "The Nights"
Chart (2024)	Position
Hungary (Rádiós Top 40)	62

== Certifications ==
Certifications for "The Nights"
Region	Certification	Certified units/sales
Australia (ARIA)	5× Platinum	350,000^{‡}
Austria (IFPI Austria)	Gold	15,000^{*}
Brazil (Pro-Música Brasil)	2× Diamond	500,000^{‡}
Denmark (IFPI Danmark)	3× Platinum	270,000^{‡}
Germany (BVMI)	Platinum	400,000^{‡}
Italy (FIMI)	3× Platinum	300,000^{‡}
Japan (RIAJ)	Gold	100,000^{*}
New Zealand (RMNZ)	5× Platinum	150,000^{‡}
Portugal (AFP)	3× Platinum	30,000^{‡}
Spain (Promusicae)	3× Platinum	180,000^{‡}
Sweden (GLF)	Platinum	40,000^{‡}
United Kingdom (BPI)	3× Platinum	1,800,000^{‡}
United States (RIAA)	Platinum	1,000,000^{‡}
Streaming
Japan (RIAJ)	Platinum	100,000,000^{†}
^{*} Sales figures based on certification alone.^{‡} Sales+streaming figures based on certification alone.^{†} Streaming-only figures based on certification alone.
