= Cathedrals & Cars =

English band

- Origin: Bury St Edmunds, Suffolk
- Genres: Alternative rock, indie rock
- Years active: 2011–present
- Label: Cemetery Bench Records
- Members: Jack Stevens; Danny Robertson; Steve Long
- Website: www.facebook.com/CathedralsAndCars

Cathedrals & Cars are an English alternative rock band formed in 2011. The group consists of Jack Stevens (vocals, guitar), Danny Robertson (bass, backing vocals) and Steve Long (drums). Since the formation of the band, they have released two EPs and one album on independent label Cemetery Bench Records.

== Formation ==
Jack Stevens met former band member Will Prentice whilst studying Music Technology at West Suffolk College in September 2010. They quickly started writing music together, and by 2011 formed an acoustic group under the name Cathedrals & Cars. Classmate Jack Hubbard joined the band shortly after they recorded their debut EP. They gained popularity within the local area sparking a considerable amount of gig offers.

After the EP being released, the band entered local music competition Bury Sound where they were met with praise from the Judges. They went on to be one of five acts that reached the final. The band finished the event as runners up and local talent Lewis Mokler went on to win.

Two years after the formation of the band, Danny Robertson and Steve Long joined Cathedrals & Cars as the full-time rhythm section. In 2015 Chris Stagg joined the group to become lead guitarist after the departure of Hubbard and Prentice.

== Releases ==
=== Sky Lanterns EP (2011) (Cemetery Bench Records) ===
Sky Lanterns was the first release from the band, it helped them gain local popularity and led on to more show offers. The band performed and recorded tracks from Sky Lanterns EP live for their debut on BBC Introducing in 2011. Although the EP didn't gain much media attention, the reviews of the live shows promoting the EP were positive.

=== Control Is Not Perfection album (2012) (Cemetery Bench Records) ===
The second release showed a significant change in the overall sound and representation of the band. The developed sound was welcomed by critics, and over all feedback was positive. The album was launched at The Hunter Club, Bury St Edmunds 28 July 2012.

=== This Is What Collection Means EP (2013) (Cemetery Bench Records) ===
The most recent EP was promoted with an abundance of live shows. On 28 September 2013 The band recorded the whole EP live at second session on BBC introducing, the track "Ivy" was picked for airplay. They also played stripped back versions of three songs on Cambridge 105 New Music Generator 23 January 2014.

=== "The Concierge" (2015, single) (self-released) ===
The Concierge was the first new material in two years from the band – premiered on Gigslutz in November 2015, the track also gained exposure from After Nyne, Impose Magazine and Slate the Disco. The band spent their time recording in residency at the Hunter Club Recording Studio in Bury St. Edmunds. The track was also aired on BBC Radio Suffolk in December 2015 on the Introducing show, and gained airplay on the Steve Lamacq show on BBC 6 Music in January 2016.

=== "Art School" (2016, single) (self-released) ===
Premiered on Louder than War in March 2016, the publication called it a "bold" and "anthemic" track by the band. It gained significant exposure on a number of other online publications, including a feature on It's All Indie.

=== "A Piece Of Me Died In Europe" (2016, single) (self-released) ===
The third single to complete the trilogy, the track was premiered by the US site New Noise Magazine. Described by them as "heavier, faster, but still darkly intelligent and unsettling", it gained further exposure and became a staple of their live set.

== Live performances ==
The band have played many venues around the UK such as The Barfly, Camden, London, supporting The Carnabys, Cambridge Junction, Headlining the "Fiver" club night, The Monarch, Camden, London (2012). The band also performed at the Great Escape in Brighton (February 2015) and The Waterfront, Norwich. The band have also supported other successful acts such as Julia Nunes and Kate Jackson (singer).

== Awards and nominations ==
- NMG Awards 2014 – Best Alternative Group
- NMG Awards 2015 – Best Alternative Group
- NMG Awards 2016 – Best Alternative Group
