= Stories (Avicii album) =

Studio album by Avicii
- Released: 2 October 2015
- Recorded: 2013–2015
- Genres: EDM; dance-pop; house; progressive house; tropical house
- Length: 54:40
- Labels: PRMD; Island
- Producers: Avicii; Salem Al Fakir; Alex Ebert; Carl Falk; Kristoffer Fogelmark; Martin Garrix; Dhani Lennevald; Albin Nedler; Vincent Pontare; Arash Pournouri

Avicii chronology
Pure Grinding / For a Better Day (2015)	Stories (2015)	Avīci (01) (2017)

Singles from Stories
- 1. "Waiting for Love" Released: May 22, 2015; 2. "For a Better Day" Released: August 28, 2015; 3. "Pure Grinding" Released: August 28, 2015; 4. "Broken Arrows" Released: September 29, 2015

Stories is the second studio album by Swedish electronic music producer Avicii, released on 2 October 2015 by PRMD Music and Island Records. It was produced by Avicii along with Salem Al Fakir, Alex Ebert, Carl Falk, Kristoffer Fogelmark, Martin Garrix, Dhani Lennevald, Ash Pournouri, Albin Nedler, and Vincent Pontare on several tracks. It is the final album to be released during his lifetime, until his death in 2018.

Stories was released to mixed to positive reviews from critics. Four singles were released from the album: "Waiting for Love", "Pure Grinding", "For a Better Day", and "Broken Arrows", along with the promotional singles "Ten More Days" and "Gonna Love Ya". It has sold one million copies worldwide as of November 2015, and was the fourth most-streamed album of the year worldwide on Spotify. The album reached number one in Norway, Sweden, and reached the top ten in fourteen countries.

== Background ==
In July 2014, Avicii told Rolling Stone that he had worked on 70 songs for his next album and would include collaborations with Jon Bon Jovi, Billie Joe Armstrong, Chris Martin, Wyclef Jean, Serj Tankian and Matisyahu. Describing the album, Avicii said: "It's going to be a lot more song-oriented." On 2 March 2015, Avicii performed live at Australia's Future Music Festival. A lot of songs were leaked onto the internet from Avicii's UMF 2015 set. These songs include "Waiting for Love", "For a Better Day", "City Lights" and "Sunset Jesus", leaked under the name "Attack". A complete track listing of the set can be found on Avicii's SoundCloud page.

On 22 May 2015, Avicii premiered his first single from Stories, "Waiting for Love". The track was co-produced by DJ and producer Martin Garrix. Almost a month later, Avicii communicated through Twitter that he had finished the album after two years of work. On 4 August 2015, it was announced on iHeartMedia Summit that Avicii's next single from Stories was "For a Better Day", featuring singer Alex Ebert. On 28 August, he released his next two singles, the other being "Pure Grinding".

== Singles ==
"Waiting for Love" is a song featuring Simon Aldred of Cherry Ghost. Avicii released it on the 22 May 2015. "For a Better Day" is a song featuring Alex Ebert. Avicii released it on 28 August 2015. "Pure Grinding" is a song featuring Kristoffer Fogelmark and Earl St. Clair. Avicii released it on 28 August 2015. "Broken Arrows" is a song featuring Zac Brown of Zac Brown Band. Avicii first released it on 29 September 2015, three days ahead of the album release as a pre-order single. It became an official single during October 2015.

=== Promotional singles ===
"Ten More Days" is a song featuring Zak Abel. Avicii released it on 30 September 2015, two days ahead of album release as a pre-order single. "Gonna Love Ya” is a song featuring Sandro Cavazza. Avicii released it on 1 October 2015, one day ahead of the album release as a pre-order single.

== Critical reception ==
Professional ratings
Aggregate scores
Source	Rating
AnyDecentMusic?	5.0/10
Metacritic	64/100
Review scores
Source	Rating
AllMusic	4/5 stars
Billboard	3/5 stars
Evening Standard	2/5 stars
The Irish Times	1/5 stars
IZM	3/5 stars
LA Weekly	2/5 stars
Mixmag	7/10
The Music	2/5 stars
Rolling Stone	2/5 stars

Stories received "generally favourable reviews", At Metacritic, the album received a score of 64. David Jeffries from AllMusic gave the album a positive review, stating that "the pleasing, alive, and diverse Stories is a fine reason to think of Avicii as a producer of attractive music, with EDM, pop, and all other genres on a sliding scale." The Boston Globe's Maura Johnston says that "Stories drags a bit at the end, the low point being a reggae-lite track starring former Fugee Wyclef Jean and the fusion-minded Matisyahu, but when it hits, it hits big." Michaelangelo Matos, from Billboard, gives the album a mixed-positive review, praising "Talk to Myself", "Touch Me" and "City Lights", saying they "are more or less direct Daft Punk homages, with a filtered, boogie-disco feel, playful effects and found-sound cut-ups". Mac McNaughton of The Music said, "Tim Bergling's second feature plays it way too safe, neither truly nauseating nor pleasingly haunting." Jim Carroll of The Irish Times said, "An album which offends greatly by its very inoffensiveness."

== Track listing ==
Stories – CD – digital download – streaming
No.	Title	Writer(s)	Producer(s)	Length
1.	"Waiting for Love"	Tim Bergling; Simon Aldred; Salem Al Fakir; Vincent Pontare; Martijn Garritsen	Bergling; Martin Garrix	3:50
2.	"Talk to Myself"	Bergling; Sterling Fox; Matt Hartke; Alex Drury	Bergling; Carl Falk; Ash Pournouri	3:55
3.	"Touch Me"	Bergling; Adriano Buffone; Gerrard O'Connell; Celeste Waite; Ash Pournouri	Bergling	3:06
4.	"Ten More Days"	Bergling; Simon Aldred; Zak Abel	Bergling	4:05
5.	"For a Better Day"	Bergling; Alex Ebert	Bergling; Ebert	3:26
6.	"Broken Arrows"	Bergling; Zac Brown; Eric Turner; Rami Yacoub; Niko Moon	Bergling; Carl Falk; Ash Pournouri	3:52
7.	"True Believer"	Bergling; Chris Martin	Bergling	4:48
8.	"City Lights"	Bergling; Noonie Bao; Oskar Jonas Wallin; Ash Pournouri	Bergling; Ash Pournouri	6:28
9.	"Pure Grinding"	Bergling; Kristoffer Fogelmark; Albin Nedler; Earl Johnson	Bergling; Kristoffer Fogelmark; Albin Nedler	2:51
10.	"Sunset Jesus"	Bergling; Sandro Cavazza; Gavin DeGraw; Carl Falk; Savan Kotecha; Dhani Lennevald; Mike Posner; Rami Yacoub	Bergling; Dhani Lennevald	4:24
11.	"Can't Catch Me"	Bergling; Matthew Miller; Wyclef Jean; Mike Einziger	Bergling	3:59
12.	"Somewhere in Stockholm"	Bergling; Daniel Adams-Ray; Henrik Jonback; Carl Petter Tarland; Oskar Jonas Wallin	Bergling	3:22
13.	"Trouble"	Bergling; Falk; Wayne Hector; Yacoub	Bergling	2:51
14.	"Gonna Love Ya"	Bergling; Sandro Cavazza; Dhani Lennevald; Ash Pournouri; Marcus Thunberg Wessel	Bergling; Ash Pournouri; Dhani Lennevald	3:35
Total length:				54:40

Stories – UK version bonus track
No.	Title	Writer(s)	Producer(s)	Length
15.	"The Nights"	Bergling; Nicholas Furlong; Gabriel Benjamin; Jordan Suecof; John Feldmann; Ash Pournouri	Bergling; Ash Pournouri	2:56
Total length:				57:29

Stories – Japan and Russia version bonus tracks
No.	Title	Writer(s)	Producer(s)	Length
15.	"The Days"	Bergling; Al Fakir; Brandon Flowers; Pontare; Robbie Williams	Bergling; Al Fakir; Pontare	4:38
16.	"The Nights"	Bergling; Furlong; Benjamin; Suecof; Feldmann; Ash Pournouri	Bergling; Ash Pournouri	2:56
17.	"Waiting for Love" (Sam Feldt Remix)	Bergling; Simon Aldred; Salem Al Fakir; Vincent Pontare	Sam Feldt; Bergling; Martijn Garritsen; Al Fakir; Pontare	5:10
Total length:				67:17

Stories – Japan tour edition bonus tracks
No.	Title	Writer(s)	Producer(s)	Length
15.	"The Days"	Bergling; Al Fakir; Brandon Flowers; Pontare	Bergling; Al Fakir; Pontare	4:38
16.	"The Nights"	Bergling; Furlong; Benjamin; Suecof; Feldmann; Ash Pournouri	Bergling; Ash Pournouri	2:57
17.	"Levels" (radio edit)			3:22
18.	"I Could Be the One" (vs. Nicky Romero) (Nicktim Radio Edit)			3:28
19.	"Silhouettes" (radio edit)			3:32
20.	"X You" (radio edit)			3:20
21.	"Feeling Good"			3:50

== Personnel ==
=== Vocals ===
- Simon Aldred (track 1)
- Sterling Fox (track 2)
- Celeste Waite (track 3)
- Zak Abel (track 4)
- Alex Ebert (track 5)
- Zac Brown (track 6)
- Chris Martin (track 7)
- Avicii (track 7)
- Noonie Bao (track 8)
- Jonas Wallin (track 8)
- Kristoffer Fogelmark (track 9)
- Earl St. Clair (tracks 9, 14)
- Sandro Cavazza (track 10, 14)
- Matisyahu (track 11)
- Wyclef Jean (track 11)
- Daniel Adams-Ray (track 12)
- Wayne Hector (track 13)
- Robbie Williams (track 15)
- Brandon Flowers (track 15)
- Salem Al Fakir (track 15)
- Nicholas Furlong (track 16)

== Charts ==
=== Weekly charts ===
Chart (2015)	Peak position
Australian Albums (ARIA)	10
Austrian Albums (Ö3 Austria)	6
Belgian Albums (Ultratop Flanders)	7
Belgian Albums (Ultratop Wallonia)	14
Canadian Albums (Billboard)	3
Czech Albums (ČNS IFPI)	25
Danish Albums (Hitlisten)	9
Dutch Albums (Album Top 100)	7
Finnish Albums (Suomen virallinen lista)	10
French Albums (SNEP)	19
German Albums (Offizielle Top 100)	8
Hungarian Albums (MAHASZ)	11
Irish Albums (IRMA)	11
Italian Albums (FIMI)	14
Japanese Albums (Oricon)	9
New Zealand Albums (RMNZ)	23
Norwegian Albums (VG-lista)	1
Scottish Albums (Official Charts)	3
South Korean Albums (Gaon)	42
Spanish Albums (Promusicae)	17
Swedish Albums (Sverigetopplistan)	1
Swiss Albums (Schweizer Hitparade)	3
UK Albums (Official Charts)	9
UK Dance Albums (Official Charts)	3
US Billboard 200	17
US Top Dance Albums (Billboard)	1
US Digital Albums (Billboard)	8
Chart (2018)	Peak position
Finnish Albums (Suomen virallinen lista)	4
Irish Albums (IRMA)	10

=== Year-end charts ===
Chart (2015)	Position
Swedish Albums (Sverigetopplistan)	3

Chart (2016)	Position
Swedish Albums (Sverigetopplistan)	11

Chart (2017)	Position
Japanese Albums (Billboard Japan)	42
Swedish Albums (Sverigetopplistan)	66

Chart (2018)	Position
Swedish Albums (Sverigetopplistan)	10

Chart (2019)	Position
Swedish Albums (Sverigetopplistan)	38

Chart (2020)	Position
Swedish Albums (Sverigetopplistan)	88

Chart (2021)	Position
Swedish Albums (Sverigetopplistan)	89

== Certifications ==
Region	Certification	Certified units/sales
Austria (IFPI Austria)	Gold	7,500^{*}
Denmark (IFPI Danmark)	Platinum	20,000^{‡}
Mexico (AMPROFON)	Gold	30,000^{^}
New Zealand (RMNZ)	Platinum	15,000^{‡}
Poland (ZPAV)	Platinum	20,000^{‡}
Singapore (RIAS)	Gold	5,000^{*}
Sweden (GLF)	2× Platinum	80,000^{‡}
United Kingdom (BPI)	Gold	100,000^{‡}
^{*} Sales figures based on certification alone.^{^} Shipments figures based on certification alone.^{‡} Sales+streaming figures based on certification alone.

== Release history ==
Region	Date	Format(s)	Label
Worldwide	2 October 2015	CD; digital download; streaming	PRMD/Island
