= The Gorge Amphitheatre =

Concert venue in Grant County, Washington, U.S.

- "The Gorge" or "The Gorge in George"
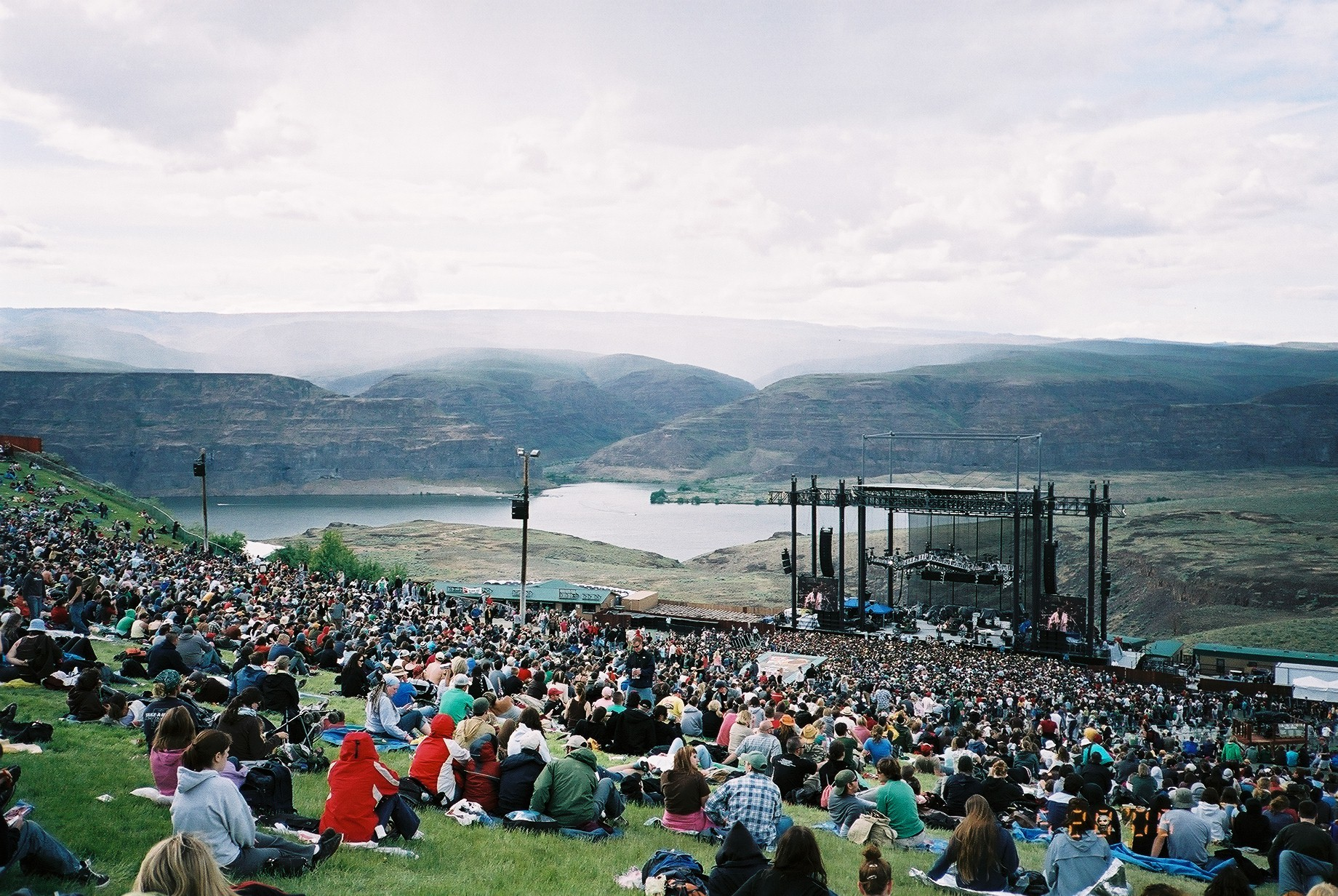
- The venue during a Sasquatch! Music Festival in 2006
- Interactive map of The Gorge Amphitheatre
- Former names: Champs de Brionne Music Theatre (1986-93)
- Address: 754 Silica Rd NW; George, WA 98848-9466
- Coordinates: 47.101°N 119.995°W
- Owner: Live Nation
- Seating type: Reserved, lawn
- Capacity: 27,500
- Type: Outdoor amphitheatre

Construction
- Opened: 1986; 40 years ago

The Gorge Amphitheatre, originally known as Champs de Brionne Music Theatre and commonly referred to as The Gorge, is an outdoor concert venue in Grant County, Washington, United States. It is situated near the Columbia River in Central Washington, nine miles (14 km) west of George and 150 miles (240 km) east of Seattle. The venue is managed by Live Nation.

It is a nine-time winner of Pollstar's award for 'Best Outdoor Music Venue' and was voted as one of the 'Best Outdoor Concert Venues in America' by ConcertBoom.

== Location ==
North of Interstate 90, The Gorge is approximately and approximately 130 miles (210 km) west of Spokane. The venue offers views of the Columbia River, Columbia Gorge canyon, and eastern Kittitas and western Grant counties. Originally, the land was planned to be used for growing grapes for wine.

== History ==
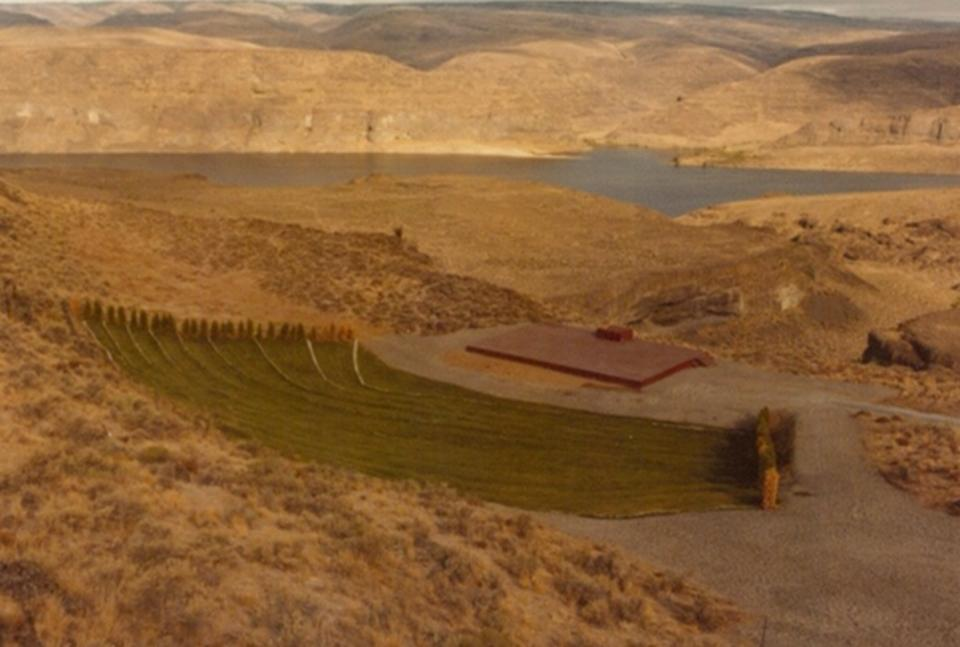
Early shot of "The Gorge", prior to expansion

The original amphitheater was owned and operated by Dr. Vincent Bryan and Carol Bryan, along with the adjoining Champs de Brionne winery, for which it was named. It opened in 1986 and seated 3,000 people, but had expanded to 19,000 by the time of its purchase by MCA in 1993. The amphitheater was expanded through rock blasting and landscaping and renamed to The Gorge. The first show at the renamed amphitheater was Tina Turner with Lindsey Buckingham as her opening act.

The Gorge Amphitheatre was acquired by Live Nation in 2006.

The Gorge (the United States)
The Gorge (Washington (state))

The White River Amphitheatre on the Muckleshoot Indian reservation near Auburn opened in 2003, directly competing with The Gorge. The venue is substantially closer to Seattle, offering a shorter travel time: around 40 minutes, as compared to 2 hours 20 minutes to the Gorge, depending on traffic. However, a columnist for The Seattle Times noted The Gorge offers a preferable view and "experience". About 400,000 people attended concerts at The Gorge Amphitheatre in 2013.

A documentary film titled Enormous: The Gorge Story was released in 2021. The film focused on the venue and its music history.

== Notable performances and festivals ==
Apart from drawing big-name performers, The Gorge has also played host to an array of popular music festivals, including Area Festival, Creation Festival, Dave Matthews Band Caravan, Endfest, H.O.R.D.E. Festival, Honda Civic Tour, Identity Festival, KUBE 93 Summer Jam, Lilith Fair, Lollapalooza, Ozzfest, Pain in the Grass, Paradiso Festival, Rock the Bells, Sasquatch! Music Festival, Uproar Festival, Vans Warped Tour, and Watershed Music Festival Above and Beyond Group Therapy.

As of 2025, Dave Matthews Band has played 79 shows at the venue, traditionally during their three-night Labor Day weekend run. The Gorge, a combination 2-CD/1-DVD set with highlights from their three-night 2002 tour closer here was released on June 29, 2004. Additionally, their September 4, 2016, tour closer was released as Live Trax, Vol. 44 on December 8, 2017. Their performance on August 30, 2025, where they played their album Before These Crowded Streets in its entirety, was released as Take Me Back: Live From the Gorge on February 6, 2026.

Phish has played the venue 22 times since 1997.

Brooks & Dunn's "Only in America" video was filmed at The Gorge on June 12, 2001.

Seattle-based Pearl Jam released a box set featuring their entire performances at the venue from 2005 and 2006, aptly titled Live at the Gorge 05/06.

Excision began hosting his annual weekend-long electronic music festival Bass Canyon at the venue in August 2018. The second year of the festival took place on August 23–25, 2019, and featured artists such as Flux Pavilion, Zomboy, Wooli, Virtual Riot, Subtronics, Liquid Stranger, Excision himself, and many more.

Beyond Wonderland an annual electronic music festival has used the venue since 2021.

Above and Beyond hosted their 250th episode of Group Therapy Radio at The Gorge on September 16, 2017, to September 17, 2017. In January 2026, it was announced that they would return for Group Therapy 700 in September 11–13.

On June 10, 2023, folk music legend Joni Mitchell headlined an event at The Gorge – her first ticketed event in more than 20 years.

== Camping ==
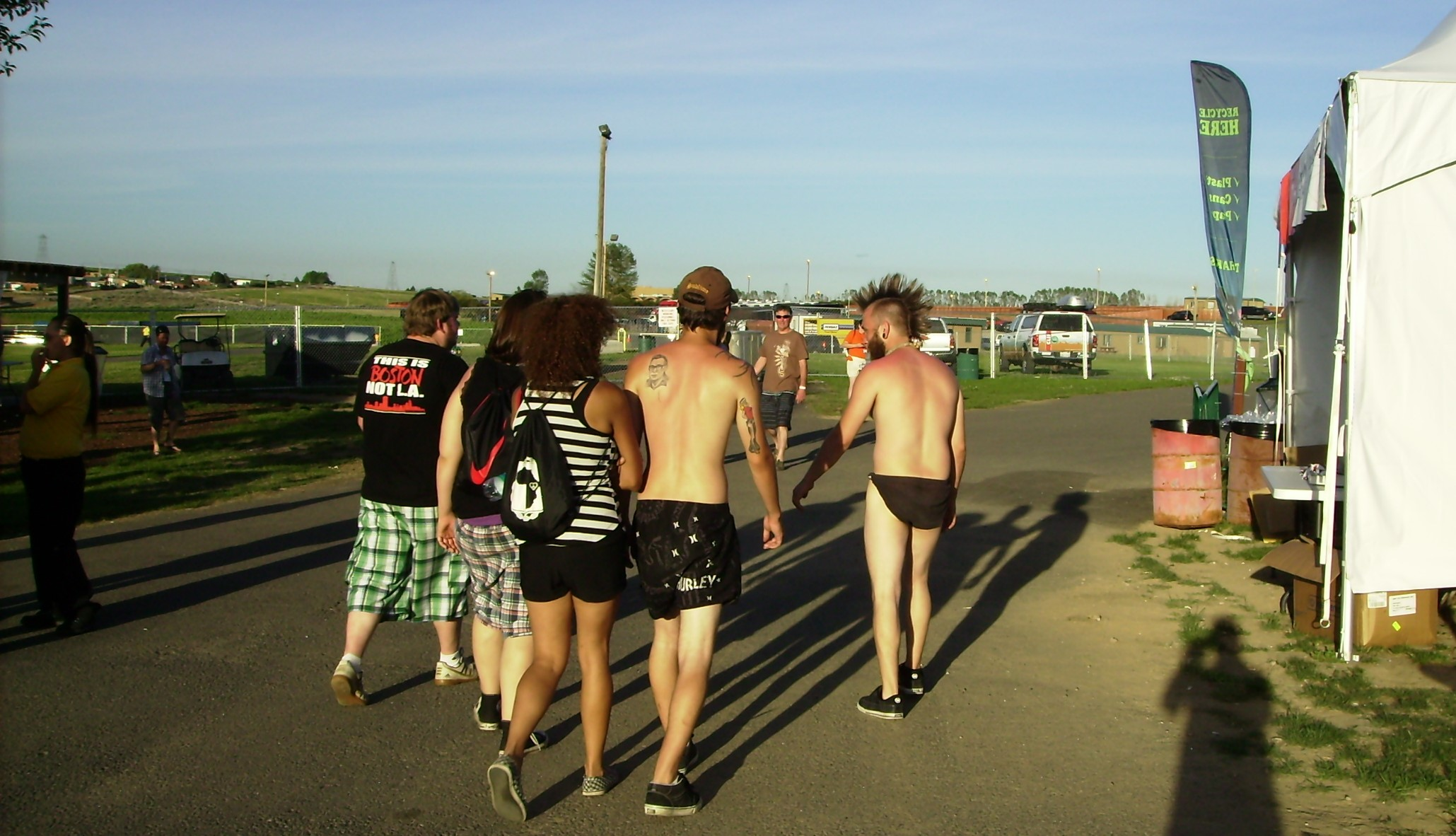
Concert goers in 2010

Fans can stay in the campground for 24 hours on the day of a single show, or until 12 noon the day after a run of shows ends. Camping at the Gorge requires the purchase of a camping ticket, which can be included in the concert admission ticket price.

The campground at the Gorge sets aside spaces for one car with up to two 2-person tents or a single RV. There are very limited RV hookups at the Gorge campground. Sites are set aside by venue staff on a first-come, first-served basis. Potable water, flush toilets, hot showers, and a convenience store are available on the grounds. The campground also has 24-hour security.

There are also other camping options near the Gorge. Notably, less than 2 miles (3.2 km) away is the Wildhorse Campground, which offers a shuttle to and from the venue that is included in the price of camping.

== Shooting ==
On June 17, 2023, during the Beyond Wonderland music festival, a mass shooting occurred at a campground near the Gorge Amphitheatre. The shooter killed two people and wounded two others. In addition, a third person, a security guard, was bruised by a bullet that deflected off her eyeglasses. A suspect, 26-year-old U.S. Army personnel James M. Kelly, a native of Strongsville, Ohio, was shot by police and arrested. The two fatalities were a female couple from the Seattle Area. The suspect was allegedly on psychedelic mushrooms during the shooting. In November 2026, Kelly was sentenced to 70 years in prison after pleading guilty in military court to the shooting.

== See also ==
- List of contemporary amphitheatres
- List of music festivals
