= Waiting for Love (Avicii song) =

2015 single by Avicii

Single by Avicii

from the album Stories
- Released: 22 May 2015
- Genre: Progressive house
- Length: 3:48
- Label: PRMD; Universal
- Songwriters: Salem Al Fakir; Simon Aldred; Tim Bergling; Martijn Garritsen; Vincent Pontare
- Producers: Avicii; Martin Garrix

Avicii singles chronology
"The Nights" (2014)	"Waiting for Love" (2015)	"For a Better Day" (2015)

Music video
- "Waiting for Love" on YouTube

"Waiting for Love" is a song by music producer Avicii with uncredited vocals by Cherry Ghost singer Simon Aldred. The track was released on 22 May 2015 as the lead single from Avicii's second studio album, Stories (2015). The lyrics were also co-written by Aldred.

== History ==
The track was first premiered at Ultra Music Festival 2015 both by Avicii and Dutch electronic producer Martin Garrix. Prior to its release on 22 May 2015, it was thought that the song would have been a full collaboration with Garrix and Bergling, with featuring vocals from John Legend, after several videos and Twitter posts were created stating this collaboration. The singer was confirmed to be Simon Aldred, the lead singer of Cherry Ghost.

== Composition ==
"Waiting For Love" is a progressive house song written in the key of F♯ minor, and follows the chord progression of F#m/C#m/D – D/E/F#m and runs at 128 BPM.

== Videos ==
=== Music video ===
The music video was directed by Sebastian Ringler. It begins with an old man (Sten Elfström) being taken care of by his wife (Ingrid Wallin) who then disappears one night along with some of her belongings. Upon discovering his wife missing in the morning, the man frantically searches the house and finds no trace of her. Distraught and despondent for days, he looks at a picture of his wife from the past before he leaves home on his mobility scooter the next day to search for her. He roams through the countryside on his scooter, witnessing many sights and wonders in his journey; including a bridge, a city, a beach, a marsh, snowy mountains, and numerous grasslands and forests. As the man's journey continues, he experiences flashbacks of him and his wife in happier times, all the while growing as a person and making unlikely friends as well as performing many good deeds along the way. He ultimately returns to his home city in the midst of a celebration and is welcomed as a celebrity, as well as discovering his wife waiting for him as they reunite and embrace in joy.

=== Lyric video ===
The animated lyric video was uploaded on 22 May 2015. It follows the story of a dog and his owner. The dog and boy have known each other since childhood and spend as much time as possible playing with each other. Once mature enough, the owner is sent to war; leaving his dog at home. After some time, the loneliness becomes too much and the dog eventually runs off in search for his master. The dog's travels take him through many places; including a city, a snowy mountain, and a grassy field until eventually finding himself in the middle of a battlefield while nearly getting killed by a bomb blast which knocks him out and makes him experience flashbacks of him and his owner when they were younger. The dog soon wakes up and keeps going despite a few injuries, eventually finding his owner in the aftermath of a battle; wounded and the lower half of his left leg missing, but still very much alive. The video ends with both (the dog and his master) back home, their injuries healed (with the young man now sporting a prosthesis for the missing half of his leg) and living in peace like they were before. Directed and edited by Jesper Eriksson and Blackmeal's CEO Matthieu Colombel, the animation has received a "phenomenal response since its release, bringing many to tears, and even inspiring ex-military personnel to thank Avicii for making the video".

=== 360° video ===
The 360° video featuring several dancers was published on May 28, 2015, and was directed by Kurt Hugo Schneider. The 360° function of this music video only works with the web browser Google Chrome (for desktop, Android and iOS).

== Track listing ==
Digital download

1. "Waiting for Love" – 3:48

Digital download – Radio edit

1. "Waiting for Love" (radio edit) – 3:48

Digital download – Extended

1. "Waiting for Love" (extended mix) – 5:24

Digital EP

1. "Waiting for Love" (Carnage and Headhunterz Remix) – 4:52
2. "Waiting for Love" (Sam Feldt Remix) – 5:16
3. "Waiting for Love" (Tundran Remix) – 3:40
4. "Waiting for Love" (Prinston and Astrid S Acoustic Version Remix) – 3:21
5. "Waiting for Love" (Autograf Remix) – 4:47
6. "Waiting for Love" (Marshmello Remix) – 4:33

Digital download – Remixes Pt. II

1. "Waiting for Love" (Astma & Rocwell Remix) – 3:47
2. "Waiting for Love" (Addal Remix) – 3:45
3. "Waiting for Love" (Fabich Remix) – 3:44

CD single

1. "Waiting for Love" – 3:51
2. "Waiting for Love" (Carnage and Headhunterz Remix) – 4:53

== Personnel ==
Personnel adapted from CD single.

- Simon Aldred – songwriter, vocals
- Salem Al Fakir – songwriter
- Vincent Pontare – songwriter
- Tim Bergling – songwriter, producer
- Martijn Garritsen – songwriter, co-producer

== Charts ==
=== Weekly charts ===
Weekly chart performance for "Waiting for Love"
Chart (2015–16)	Peak position
Australia (ARIA)	15
Austria (Ö3 Austria Top 40)	1
Belgium (Ultratop 50 Flanders)	15
Belgium (Ultratop 50 Wallonia)	10
Canada Hot 100 (Billboard)	49
Czech Republic Airplay (ČNS IFPI)	2
Denmark (Tracklisten)	5
Finland (Suomen virallinen lista)	2
France (SNEP)	14
France Airplay (SNEP)	2
Germany (GfK)	8
Hungary (Dance Top 40)	2
Hungary (Rádiós Top 40)	1
Hungary (Single Top 40)	1
Hungary (Stream Top 40)	2
Ireland (IRMA)	2
Italy (FIMI)	9
Japan Hot 100 (Billboard)	29
Netherlands (Dutch Top 40)	6
Netherlands (Single Top 100)	5
New Zealand (Recorded Music NZ)	15
Norway (VG-lista)	1
Poland Airplay (ZPAV)	5
Poland Dance (ZPAV)	3
Portugal (AFP)	44
Romania Airplay (Media Forest)	3
Scottish Singles Sales (Official Charts)	2
Slovenia Airplay (SloTop50)	8
South Africa Airplay (EMA)	10
Spain (Promusicae)	13
Sweden (Sverigetopplistan)	1
Switzerland (Schweizer Hitparade)	7
UK Singles (Official Charts)	6
US Bubbling Under Hot 100 (Billboard)	10
US Hot Dance/Electronic Songs (Billboard)	7

Chart (2026)	Peak position
Colombia Anglo Airplay (National-Report)	10

=== Year-end charts ===
2015 year-end chart performance for "Waiting for Love"
Chart (2015)	Position
Argentina (Monitor Latino)	72
Australia (ARIA)	75
Austria (Ö3 Austria Top 40)	20
Belgium (Ultratop Flanders)	65
Belgium (Ultratop Wallonia)	72
France (SNEP)	69
Germany (Official German Charts)	32
Hungary (Dance Top 40)	12
Hungary (Rádiós Top 40)	29
Hungary (Single Top 40)	18
Italy (FIMI)	22
Netherlands (Dutch Top 40)	29
Netherlands (Single Top 100)	25
Poland (ZPAV)	47
Spain (PROMUSICAE)	39
Sweden (Sverigetopplistan)	8
Switzerland (Schweizer Hitparade)	25
UK Singles (Official Charts Company)	56
US Hot Dance/Electronic Songs (Billboard)	26

2016 year-end chart performance for "Waiting for Love"
Chart (2016)	Position
Hungary (Dance Top 40)	34

2018 year-end chart performance for "Waiting for Love"
Chart (2018)	Position
Sweden (Sverigetopplistan)	90

== Certifications ==
Certifications for "Waiting for Love"
Region	Certification	Certified units/sales
Australia (ARIA)	4× Platinum	280,000^{‡}
Austria (IFPI Austria)	Gold	15,000^{‡}
Belgium (BRMA)	Platinum	20,000^{‡}
Brazil (Pro-Música Brasil)	2× Diamond	500,000^{‡}
Canada (Music Canada)	Platinum	80,000^{‡}
Denmark (IFPI Danmark)	2× Platinum	180,000^{‡}
Germany (BVMI)	Platinum	400,000^{‡}
Italy (FIMI)	4× Platinum	200,000^{‡}
Japan (RIAJ)	Gold	100,000^{*}
New Zealand (RMNZ)	3× Platinum	90,000^{‡}
Poland (ZPAV)	4× Platinum	200,000^{‡}
Portugal (AFP)	Platinum	10,000^{‡}
Spain (Promusicae)	2× Platinum	80,000^{‡}
Sweden (GLF)	7× Platinum	280,000^{‡}
United Kingdom (BPI)	2× Platinum	1,200,000^{‡}
United States (RIAA)	Gold	500,000^{‡}
Streaming
Japan (RIAJ)	Platinum	100,000,000^{†}
^{*} Sales figures based on certification alone.^{‡} Sales+streaming figures based on certification alone.^{†} Streaming-only figures based on certification alone.

== Release history ==
Release history and formats for "Waiting for Love"
Version	Date	Format	Label
Original mix	22 May 2015	Digital download	PRMD; Universal
Extended mix	1 June 2015	Digital download	PRMD; Universal
