= Cage Script =

Studio album by K?d
- Released: December 9, 2022
- Genres: Future bass; trance; house; electro-pop
- Length: 43:28
- Label: HARD Recs
- Producers: K?d; Masayoshi Iimori; KOTONOHOUSE

Singles from Cage Script
- 1. "Return to Nothingness" Released: February 25, 2022; 2. "Flow in You" Released: March 18, 2022; 3. "If This is a Dream" Released: July 1, 2022; 4. "Three in the Morning" Released: September 9, 2022; 5. "Protect Me" Released: October 21, 2022

Cage Script (styled as CAGE SCRIPT) is the debut album by American DJ and producer K?d, released on December 9, 2022.

== Background ==
The concept of the album was first announced on Twitter on March 6, 2019, although was originally announced as an extended play.

The album consists of 12 songs, including five singles, "Return to Nothingness", "Flow in You" featuring South Korean vocalist June One, "If This is a Dream", "Three in the Morning" featuring vocalist Cecilia Gault, and "Protect Me" featuring Yadosan. The final album features additional features from Japanese producers Masayoshi Limori and KOTONOHOUSE, and Japanese vocalist RANASOL. Accompanying the album, an anime-inspired music video have also been released. The tracks of the album and music videos recounts the story of a universe in which k?d finds himself, being described as a "story in the k?d universe" by K?d in an interview with Your EDM.

== Reception ==
Cameron Sunkel of Edm.com described the album as "a diverse fusion of genres" and showing K?d's "versatility on the production side," and that the album "packs an unexpected twist. There's many moments throughout the LP listeners find themselves on their toes," citing the hard dance-style drop of the track "Experience".

== Track listing ==
No.	Title	Length
1.	"Return to Nothingness"	3:40
2.	"Flow in You" (featuring June One)	3:05
3.	"If This is a Dream"	3:47
4.	"Three in the Morning" (featuring Cecilia Gault)	2:50
5.	"Protect Me" (featuring Yadosan)	2:24
6.	"Back Again" (with Masayoshi Iimori)	3:26
7.	"Experience"	3:13
8.	"Somewhat Human"	3:54
9.	"Be Mine"	4:57
10.	"Home Prayer"	3:40
11.	"In Your Eyes 「瞳の中で」" (with KOTONOHOUSE featuring RANASOL)	4:15
12.	"In Your Eyes- Instrumental Take" (with KOTONOHOUSE (Bonus Track))	4:13
Total length:		43:28
