= Luca Lush =

American producer, DJ and remixer

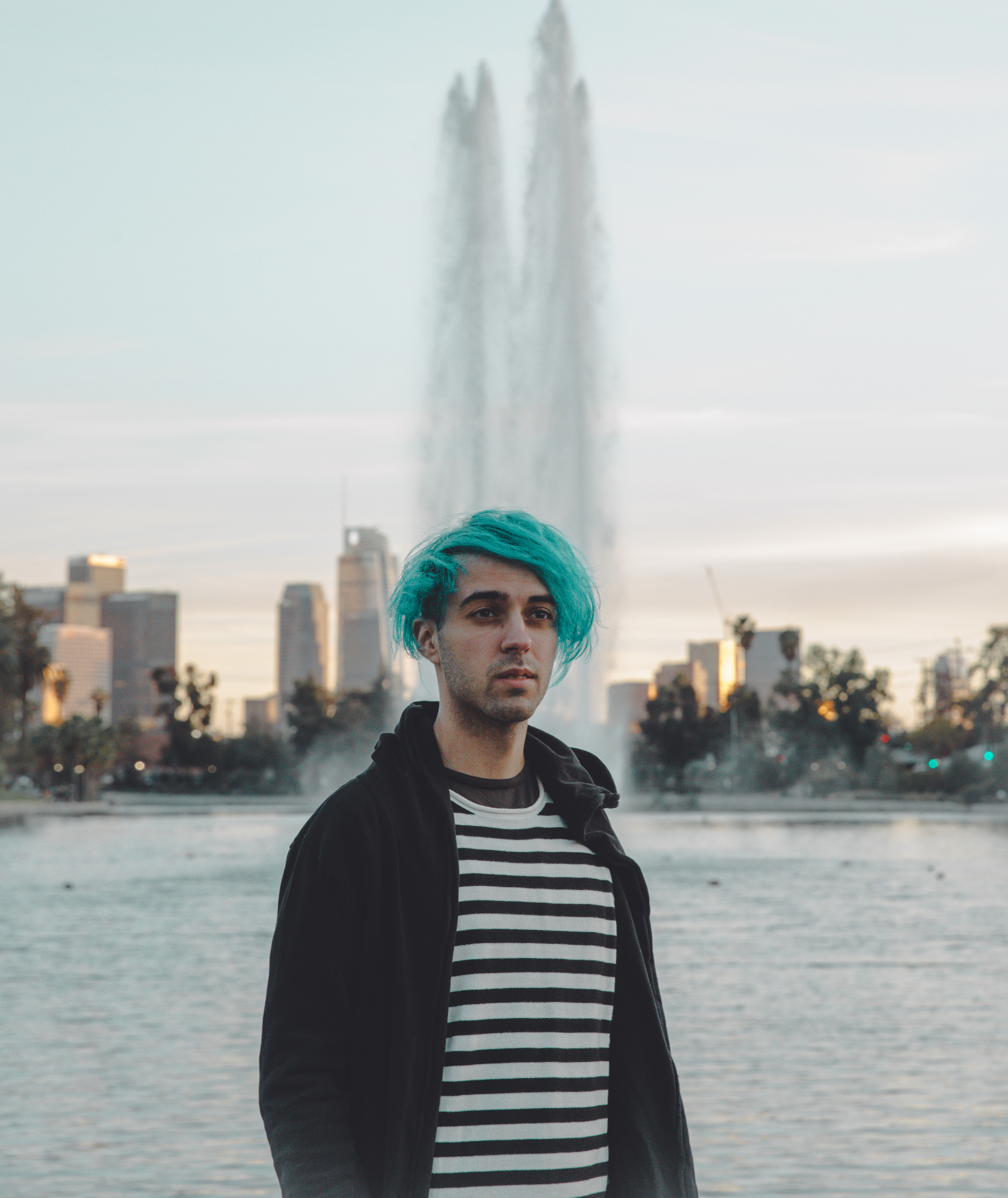

Background information
- Origin: New York, United States
- Genres: EDM; moombahton; future bass; trap; house
- Instruments: Digital audio workstation
- Years active: 2014–present
- Labels: Ultra; Monstercat; Columbia

Wolfgang Robinowitz, better known as Luca Lush, is an American DJ, producer and remixer based in Brooklyn, New York.

== Early life and career ==
Lush grew up playing drums in bands before going to college where he learned to program music.

In June 2016, he collaborated with producer K?D to release the song "Amaretto". In June 2017, Lush released the song "Midnight City" and in August 2017, the song "A Boy Brushed Blue Living In Black And White".

In 2019 Lush signed to Vital Management.

== Discography ==
=== Singles ===
2015

- "Club Love" (featuring Feki)
- "Torn" (featuring Jupe)
- "Shvke"
- "Cherry Blossom"

2016

- "Boom"
- "Anything 4 U"

2017

- "Whirlwind"
- "O Bb" (featuring Devault)
- "A Boy Brushed Blue Living in Black and White"

2018

- "Sasha's Theme"
- "God's Plan" featuring Kid Travis
- "Vermilion"
- "Demon" featuring Kamiyada
- "All Girls Are the Same" featuring Kid Travis

2019

- "Sucker Punch" with Lil Texas

=== Remixes ===
- Atlas Bound – "Tell Me" (Luca Lush Remix)
- Baauer – "One Touch" (Luca Lush and Dirty Chocolate Remix)
- Marshmello - Alone (Luca Lush Remix & Edit v2.5)
- Benny Benassi and Skrillex featuring Gary Go – "Cinema" (Luca Lush Remix)
- Ciara – "Promise" (Luca Lush Remix)
- Drake – "Hotline Bling" (Luca Lush Remix)
- Flume – "Some Minds" (Luca Lush Remix)
- Gallant – "Weight In Gold" (Luca Lush Remix)
- Keith Ape – "It G Ma" (Luca Lush Remix)
- Mark Redito – "So Many Things To Tell You" (Luca Lush Remix)
- MGMT – "Kids" (Luca Lush Remix)
- Migos – "Bad and Boujee" (Luca Lush Remix)
- Rihanna featuring Drake – "Work" (Luca Lush Remix)
- Snbrn featuring Kerli – "Raindrops" (Luca Lush Remix)
- Wyclef Jean – "Sweetest Girl" (Luca Lush Remix)
- Jimmy Eat World - "The Middle" (Luca Lush Remix)
- Zayn featuring Sia - "Dusk Till Dawn" (Luca Lush Remix)
- Travis Scott featuring Drake - "Sicko Mode" (Luca Lush Remix)
- Travis Scott - "Antidote" (Luca Lush Remix)
- The Chainsmokers - All We Know ft. Phoebe Ryan (LUCA LUSH LIFT)
