= Harber (DJ) =

HARBER
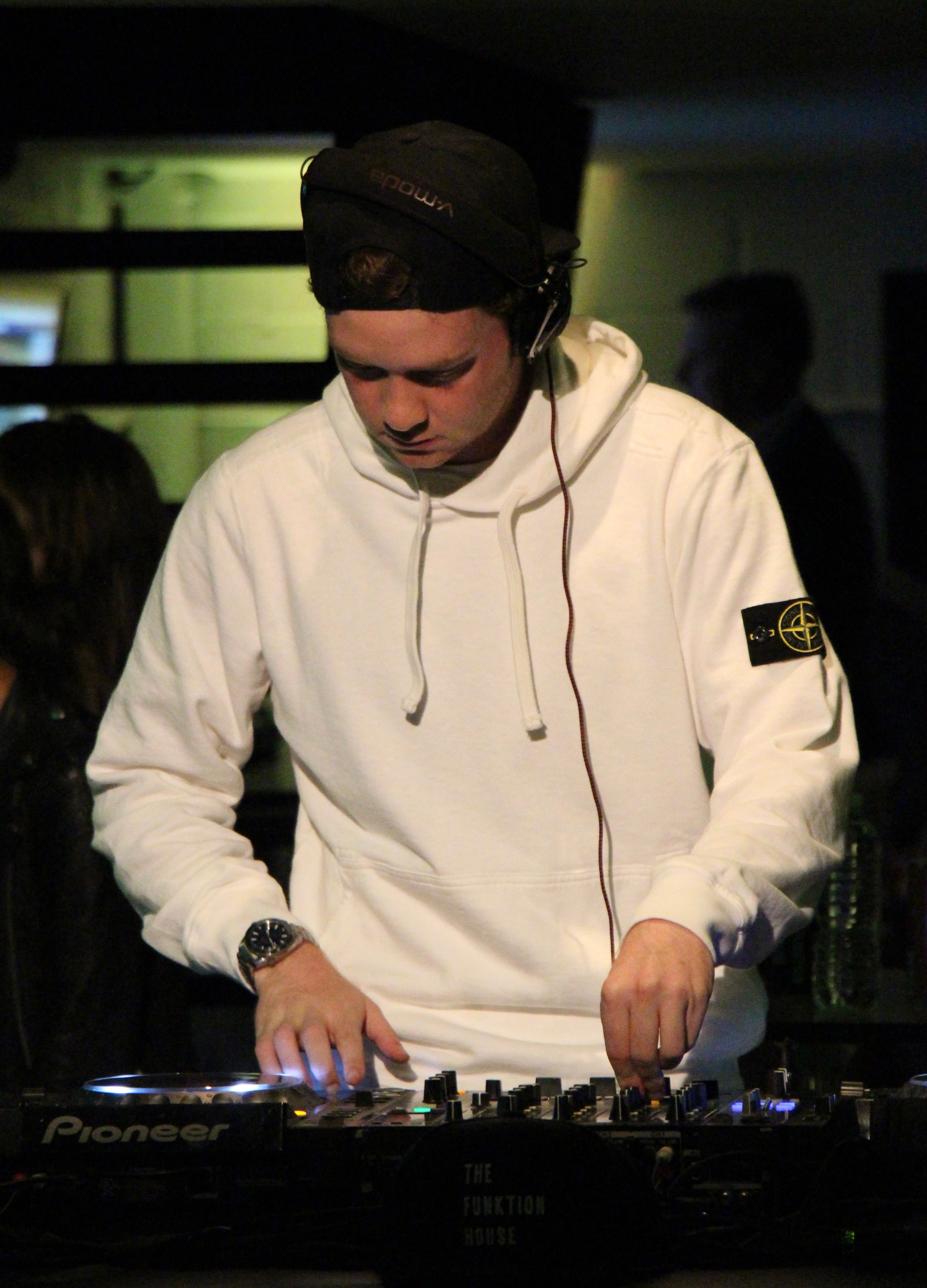

Background information
- Born: Harry Berman; April 4, 1997 (age 29); New York City, U.S.
- Genres: EDM; dance-pop; house; electronic
- Occupations: Producer; DJ; Songwriter; Composer; Musician
- Years active: 2018–present
- Labels: Lowly; Musical Freedom; Spinnin'; Armada; Thrive; 450 Music; PRMD; Warner; Be Yourself Music; Wall Recordings; Liftoff Recordings; LoudKult
- Website: www.itsharber.com

Harry Berman (born April 4, 1997), also known as HARBER, is an American DJ, producer, songwriter, and musician based in New York City, New York. The two-time Billboard charting & U.S. Dance Radio top 10 artist from the United States is best known for his originals, collaborations, and remixes. HARBER is an electronic dance music (EDM) musician, who most notably incorporates various electronic sub-genres, elements, and tones, within his music and live performances and DJ sets.

== Early life ==
Berman was born in New York City, New York, and raised in Connecticut before returning to his city roots. He is the son of Michael J. Berman and Victoria Hagan. Berman's passion for pursuing a career in music began shortly after a shoulder injury while playing with his high school baseball team. He is a graduate of New York University (NYU) in Manhattan.

== Musical style ==
HARBER has become known for his diverse artistic and creative production and DJ style, incorporating electronic dance music (EDM) crossover elements with various other genres and musical styles, including pop, house, disco, moomabahton, bass, dancehall, and more.

== Career: Originals, Remixes & Accomplishments ==
=== 2023 ===
HARBER signed with Lowly Palace, the record label division of Trap Nation, where he's released the U.S. Dance Radio top 10 smash single "Medicine" (feat. Sydtherockerkid), which is currently at #13 on the Dance Airplay/Mix Show Billboard Charts. Additionally, he's released "Remedy" (ft. Alex Jones), "Falling For You" with Disco Fries (ft. Sydtherockerkid), and a remix of "Love You Loud" by Disco Fries & Ferry Corsten (ft. Leon Stanford).

=== 2022 ===
In May 2022, HARBER released "Nothing" on Spinnin Records alongside Disco Fries & GRAMMY-nominated songwriter & vocalist Luxtides. In August, HARBER collaborated with two-time GRAMMY Award-nominated Morgan Page on "Body Like" (ft. sid tipton) via Armada Music.

=== 2021 ===
HARBER made his debut on Tiesto's Musical Freedom Records & Spinnin' Records with "Feelings After Dark," a collaboration with Michael Calfan featuring NISHA. He also provided an official remix for the GRAMMY-nominated "Hero" by Afrojack & David Guetta on Wall Recordings.

=== 2020 ===
At the start of 2020, HARBER performed as direct support for sold-out shows with Steve Aoki at Echostage in Washington, D.C., as well as Avant Gardner in Brooklyn, New York, during Made Event's sold-out Snakehips event.

HARBER appeared on the season finale of Summer House on Bravo TV, where he performed for the cast's Raver Day Weekend party. To commemorate the show's fourth season debut, HARBER provided the soundtrack with a DJ set during the Summer House season 4 premiere at Bounce Sporting Club, NYC.

Amid the Coronavirus pandemic, HARBER released an original to various speech excepts from New York Governor, Andrew Cuomo, “Love Wins,” along with a coinciding video, which went viral on social media. HARBER also served as one of the headlining performers during The Nocturnal Times (along with MrRevillz and Pioneer DJ) 3-day virtual fundraising event, World On Pause Festival on May 2, 3, & 4. The event raised nearly $20k towards COVID-19 relief for The GRAMMYs/Recording Academy MusiCares, Feed the Children, and the Restaurant Workers Community Foundation. HARBER performed alongside over 60 artists, including SOFI TUKKER, Sam Feldt, Felix Jaehn, Joel Corry, Firebeatz, ARTY, Bassjackers, Frank Walker, Lost Frequencies, Jay Hardway, Lucas & Steve, Sander van Doorn, Markus Schulz, Danny Avila, BONNIE X CLYDE, Fly By Midnight, and many more.

In addition to providing a remix for international superstar Ananya Birla (“Let There Be Love”), HARBER released four original singles in 2020. “F*CK WORK”, a revamped original of the 1980s hit “Working For The Weekend” by Loverboy, which features Kyle Cooke, the leading Summer House cast member and founder of Loverboy sparkling tea beverage, Loverboy. The song made its worldwide premiere exclusively through People Magazine in March 2020. In May, HARBER released “Pieces” featuring NISHA on Disco Fries’ Liftoff Recordings. One of HARBER's biggest original singles to date, “Good For It” feat. CATALI, saw its official release in August through Be Yourself Music. “Good For It” saw support from Dimitri Vegas & Like Mike, R3HAB, Kryder, and landed HARBER his own guest mix on SLAM! In October 2020, HARBER released his original rendition of the classic disco anthem “Stayin’ Alive” on LoudKult, originally made famous by the Bee Gees.

=== 2019 ===
HARBER made his Billboard chart debut as his song “More Than You” with Lexy Panterra spent nine weeks on the Billboard Dance Club Songs chart (No. 21 peak position). Co-written along with Kate Morgan (songwriter of The Chainsmokers "Hope" and the US RIAA Gold certified “IDWK” by DVBBS & Blackbear). HARBER and Lexy Panterra's "More Than You" saw support from leading acts such as Dimitri Vegas & Like Mike, Chantel Jeffries, The Chainsmokers, Liquid Todd on SiriusXM BetaBPM, among others.

US Weekly exclusively revealed HARBER's follow-up single, “Savior” feat. Axel through 450 Music on July 19, which made its exclusive premiere on Forbes. “Savior” is written by Berman, Axel Enhström (previously featured on Lost Frequencies “All Or Nothing”, Alle Farben “Bad Ideas”), and Nisha Asnani (songwriter of Illenium & Gryffin feat. Daya "Feel Good").

During Miami Music Week 2019, HARBER made his MMW/Winter Music Conference debut at The Shore Club during Moksi & Friends (Moksi, Curbi, Born Dirty & Damaged Goods). In May 2019, HARBER donated ticket proceeds from a headline show in support of To Write Love On Her Arms (TWLOHA), the non-profit, suicide prevention organization.

=== 2018 ===
HARBER made his PRMD Music debut, the original label imprint of the late Avicii. He released “Me And My Friends” featuring Angel Taylor (previously featured on Armin van Buuren “Make It Right”, Arty “Up All Night”, and Tritonal “Getaway). The HARBER remix of Prismo’s “Solo” was also released through PRMD/ICONS Music.

His first original, "Summer You", was released on May 11, 2018, via 450 Music and was featured on Spotify's New Music Friday Cratediggers & Chill Tracks playlists.

=== Remixes ===
Over the last several years, HARBER has provided standout remixes for the GRAMMY Award-winning "Tequila" by Dan + Shay, GRAMMY-Award nominated "Hero" by Afrojack & David Guetta [Wall Recordings/Spinnin' Records], "Miles To Your Heart" by Sultan + Shepard x Rock Mafia x Bahari [12 Tone Music], "Worlds Collide" by NERVO on Thrive Music/Universal Music Group, “Solo” by Prismo [PRMD Music], "Love Lies" by Khalid & Normani, ”Don’t Call” from Lost Kings, his Trap Nation Radio & Crankdat supported remix of The Chainsmokers "Sick Boy", Fountains of Wayne, 3lau & more.
