= Broken Arrows (song) =

Single by Avicii

from the album Stories
- Released: 29 September 2015
- Genre: Progressive house; country pop
- Length: 4:16 (single version and radio edit); 3:52 (album version)
- Label: Universal Music; PRMD
- Songwriters: Tim Bergling; Zac Brown; Rami Yacoub; Carl Falk; Niko Moon; Eric Turner
- Producer: Avicii

Avicii singles chronology
"For a Better Day" / "Pure Grinding" (2015)	"Broken Arrows" (2015)	"Taste the Feeling" (2016)

Music video
- "Avicii - Broken Arrows" on YouTube

"Broken Arrows" is a 2015 single by Avicii featuring uncredited vocals from Zac Brown of American country music group Zac Brown Band, released on Universal Music on 29 September 2015. The track appears on his album Stories.

== Composition ==
"Broken Arrows" combines Brown's vocals with "thumping bass and twinkling synth lines".

Like one of Avicii's previous singles, "Hey Brother", "Broken Arrows" is a progressive house and country pop song containing elements of dance music. It is written in the key of G major as another mode in E minor, with Brown’s vocal range in the song spanning from the low note of D_{3} to the mid note of G_{3} as the same third octave, all the way to the high note of G_{4} after one octave. It follows a chord progression of Em/C/G - Em/C/G/D and runs at a tempo of 110 beats per minute.

== Reception ==
"Broken Arrows" received positive reviews from critics. Chris Parton of Rolling Stone described Brown's vocals as "crystal-clear" and the song's hook as "a cross between a game-show theme song and something from Nintendo's Super Mario Brothers", while Marcus K. Dowling noted similarities between this song and the Kenny Rogers song The Gambler in a review for Insomniac.

== Music video ==
The accompanying music video for the song was directed by Julius Onah. It was released on 23 November 2015. It is inspired by the life of Dick Fosbury, who revolutionized the high jump by introducing a new technique known as the Fosbury Flop.

The music video starts with the caption: "Inspired by a True Story" and is located in Fairmont, a fictitious location in California in 1967, where a struggling athlete lives alone with his daughter in a trailer. The athlete is chastised by his trainer for not achieving enough on the field. The athlete is shown descending into alcoholism and despair. But the athlete is inspired again by his daughter's zeal and acrobatics to invent a new technique in jumping, leading to a gold medal at the 1968 Summer Olympics. Although talking about Fosbury, the video displays however a newspaper clipping, attributing it to a fictional American high jump Olympic athlete named Richard Radomsky in the video. The athlete also has Avicii's signature AV sign tattooed on his back.

The role of Richard Radomsky is played by Joshua Fredric Smith, and his daughter is played by Emily Skinner. Richard Neil plays the coach in the video.

== Track listing ==
Digital download – Remixes
No.	Title	Length
1.	"Broken Arrows" (M-22 Remix)	3:58
2.	"Broken Arrows" (Aston Shuffle Remix)	3:39
3.	"Broken Arrows" (k?d Remix)	4:22
4.	"Broken Arrows" (Didrick Remix)	2:55
Total length:		14:54

== Charts ==
=== Weekly charts ===
Weekly chart performance for "Broken Arrows"
Chart (2015–16)	Peak position
Australia (ARIA)	30
Austria (Ö3 Austria Top 40)	70
Belgium (Ultratip Bubbling Under Flanders)	12
Belgium Dance (Ultratop Flanders)	16
Belgium (Ultratip Bubbling Under Wallonia)	48
Belgium Dance (Ultratip Wallonia)	1
Germany (GfK)	82
Hungary (Dance Top 40)	25
Hungary (Rádiós Top 40)	1
Hungary (Single Top 40)	21
Ireland (IRMA)	74
Netherlands (Single Top 100)	86
New Zealand Heatseekers (Recorded Music NZ)	7
Norway (VG-lista)	38
Slovakia Airplay (ČNS IFPI)	95
Sweden (Sverigetopplistan)	4
Switzerland (Schweizer Hitparade)	57
US Hot Dance/Electronic Songs (Billboard)	10

2018 weekly chart performance for "Broken Arrows"
Chart (2018)	Peak position
Hungary (Stream Top 40)	39

=== Year-end charts ===
Year-end chart performance for "Broken Arrows"
Chart (2015)	Position
Sweden (Sverigetopplistan)	88
US Hot Dance/Electronic Songs (Billboard)	82
Chart (2016)	Position
Hungary (Dance Top 40)	86
Hungary (Rádiós Top 40)	14
US Hot Dance/Electronic Songs (Billboard)	79

== Certification ==
Certifications for "Broken Arrows"
Region	Certification	Certified units/sales
Brazil (Pro-Música Brasil)	Gold	30,000^{‡}
Canada (Music Canada)	Gold	40,000^{‡}
Sweden (GLF)	3× Platinum	120,000^{‡}
United Kingdom (BPI)	Silver	200,000^{‡}
^{‡} Sales+streaming figures based on certification alone.

== See also ==
- Zac Brown Band discography
