= Armnhmr =

DJ and music producer duo

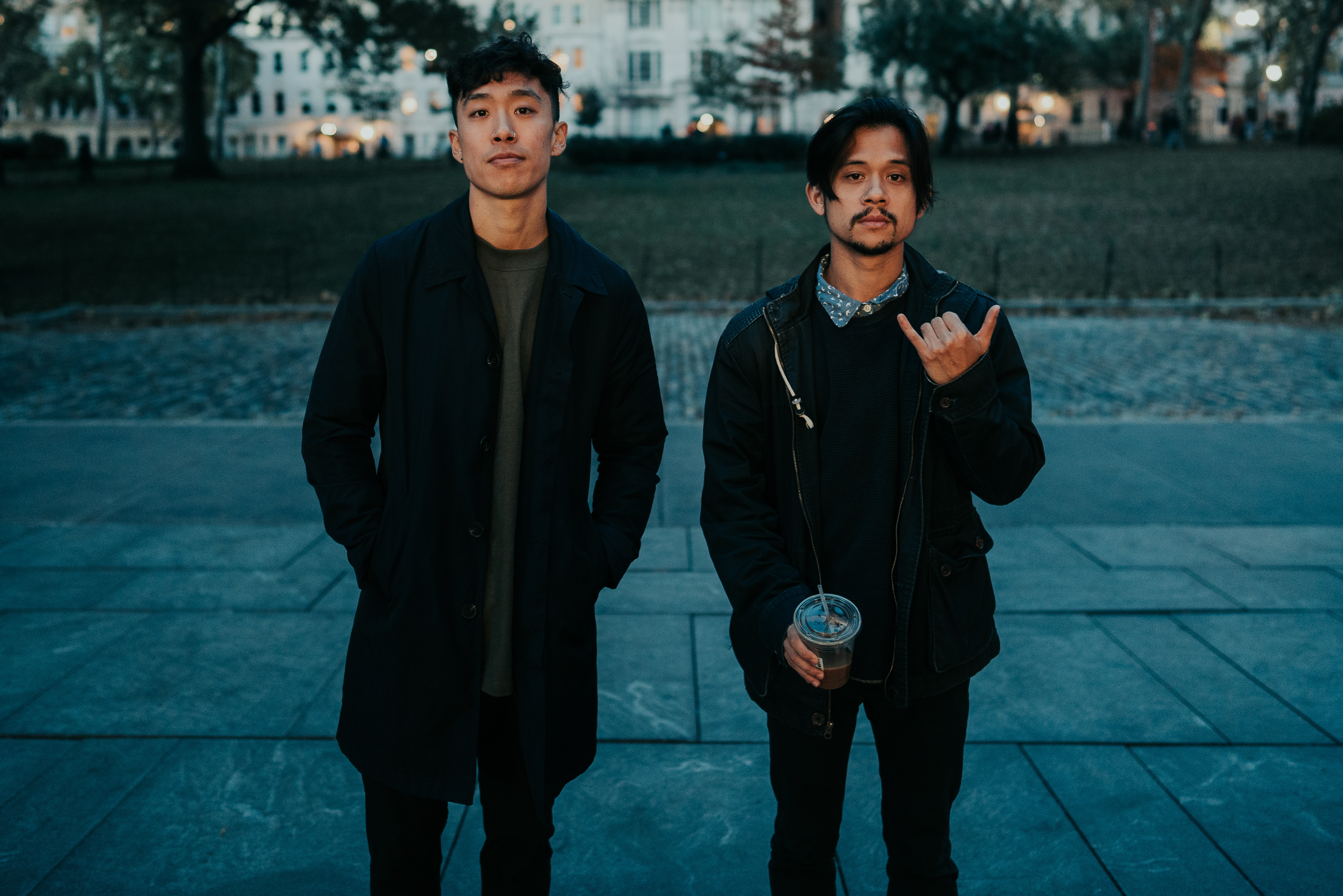
- Armnhmr in 2023

Background information
- Origin: Los Angeles, California, U.S.
- Genres: Electronic; Melodic bass; Future bass
- Occupations: DJs; musicians; producers
- Instrument: Ableton Live
- Years active: 2013–present
- Labels: Barong Family; Dim Mak; Monstercat
- Members: Joseph Chung; Joseph Abella
- Website: www.armnhmr.com

Joseph Chung and Joseph Abella, who go by the stage name Armnhmr, (Note: Stylized in all caps) are Los Angeles, California-based musicians, DJs, and record producers. While existing in the electronic dance music (EDM) scene Armnhmr is represented by Monstercat, Dim Mak, Barong Family, Brednbutter, and Armnhmr LLC. They have collaborated with other artists such as Abandoned, Medyk, Nurko and Synymata.

== Early life ==
As a child, Chung reportedly grew up in a household that was into music and dance which sparked his interest in EDM. Abella on the other hand took an interest in electronic music after attending Electronic Daisy Carnival in Los Angeles. Chung and Abella met while attending California State Polytechnic College, Pomona and the two took an interest in producing music after attending multiple music festivals with each other.

== Career ==
The duo begun their career taking smaller gigs in and around Koreatown, Los Angeles and begun releasing music in 2015. Using Ableton Live, the pair released their first song, "Fallen", on October 13, 2015. After almost 4 more years of releasing singles and remixes, their debut album, "The Free World" was released on February 7, 2020. The Album contained 13 tracks and featured a number of singers that the duo would continue to work with on future projects including Melanie Fontana and Nevve. Accompanying the release of the album, "The Free World Tour" was announced which featured 24 stops within the United States and Canada. 3 years later on August 31, 2023, the duo released their second album, "Together as one". The second album featured 10 tracks and a "Together as one" accompanying tour was announced that included a number of shows in North America. In March 2024, the duo announced that they would be resident DJs at the Wynn— becoming the first Asian American EDM duo to be resident DJs at a major club on the Las Vegas strip. The duo has played at a number of electronic music festivals including Electronic Daisy Carnival, Beyond Wonderland, and S2O.

== Discography ==
=== Albums ===
Title	Year	Refs
Together As One	2023	
The Free World	2020	

=== Extended plays ===
Title	Year	Refs
Waiting for Love	2022	
A Thousand Dreams EP	2020	

=== Singles ===
Title	Year	Refs
Gone	2024	
Lifeline	2023	
Someone to Forget	2023	
Drowing	2023	
It's You	2022	
Won't Make A sound	2022	
Falling Apart	2022	
Saving Lives	2021	
Never Gets You Back	2021	
Everybody Feels	2021	
Sun Comes Up on You	2021	
One Sided	2021	
Anywhere	2021	
Fragile	2020	
Coming Home	2020	
Here with me	2020	
Let Light Out	2019	
The Universe if Yours	2019	
Silver Lining	2019	
Save You Now	2019	
Hello, Goodbye	2019	
The World We Knew EP	2019	
So Long, My friend	2019	
The End of Time	2019	
Back to You	2019	
To Say Goodbye	2019	
Leave It All	2018	
Won't Come Back	2018	
Alone	2017	
Oceans	2017	
Farewell	2017	
Want U	2017	
Need You	2017	
Closer (featuring Halsey)	2016	
Wings	2016	
Rain	2016	
Feel so Good	2016	
Fallen	2015	
