= Beyond Wonderland =

American EDM festival

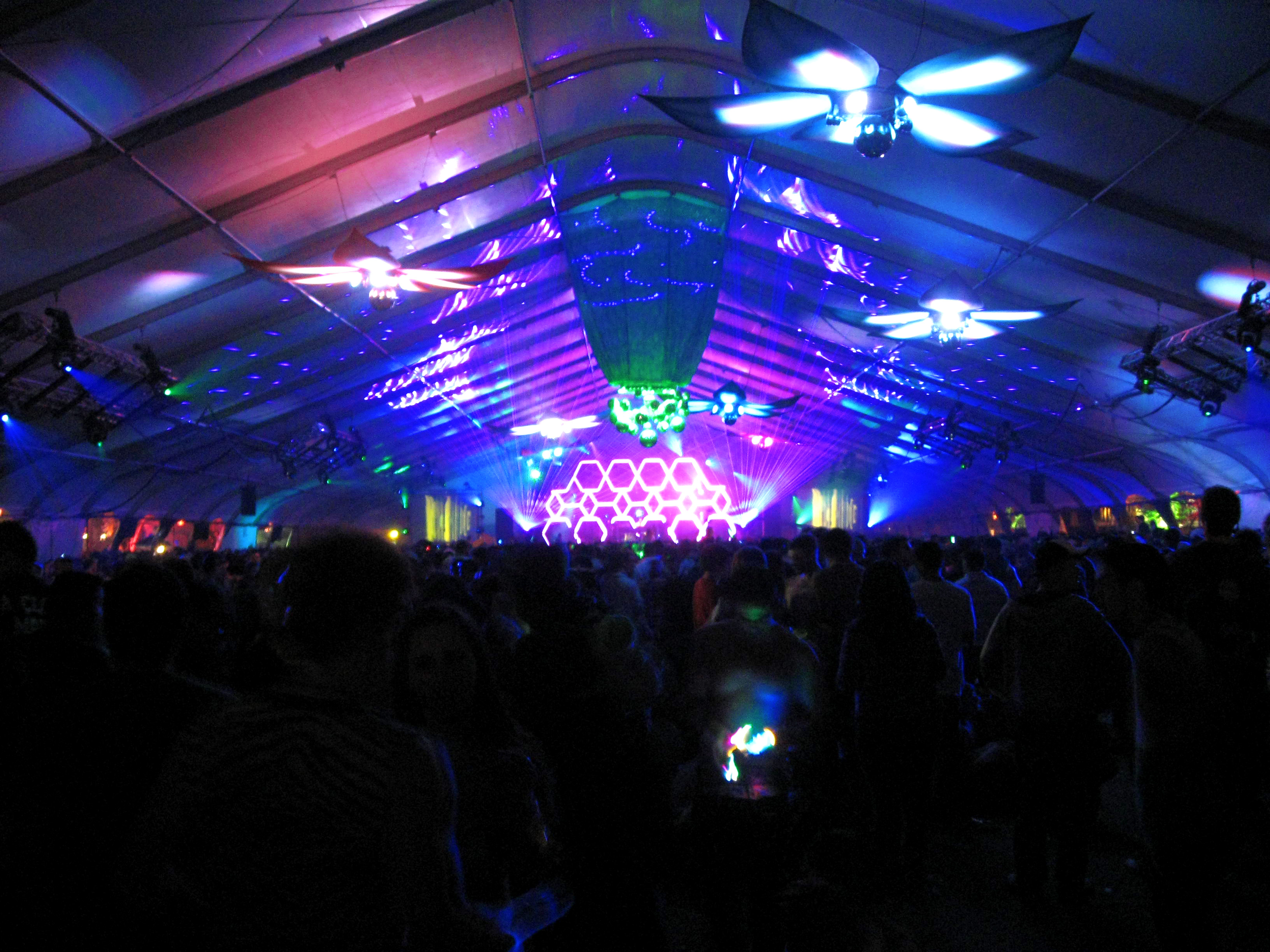
- Main stage in 2010
- Genre: Trance, dance, EDM, house, drum and bass, techno, dance-punk, hip hop
- Dates: March (Southern California); May (Washington); June (Chicago); September (Northern California)
- Locations: San Bernardino, California, U.S. Seattle, Washington, U.S. Mountain View, California, U.S. George, Washington, U.S. Chicago, Illinois, U.S.
- Years active: 2010–present (Southern California); 2011, 2020–present (Washington); 2012–2015 (Northern California); 2024–present (Chicago)
- Founders: Insomniac Events
- Website: www.beyondwonderland.com

Beyond Wonderland is an electronic dance festival organized by Insomniac Events. The event has been held in various locations across the west coast including Seattle, San Bernardino, and Mountain View spanning either one or two days. As the festival continued to grow from its earlier roots, it has branched into two festivals: Beyond Socal and Beyond Norcal/Bay Area, catering to the growing audience. However, this expansion of the Beyond series lasted for only four years before founder Pasquale Rotella announced that he would no longer continue having both Beyond Socal and Norcal to pursue expansion and creation of other festivals of the Insomniac brand.

In 2017, the international debut of Beyond Wonderland took place in Mexico and in 2019 it also debuted in Colombia.

== History ==
The history of Beyond Wonderland extends back before its inaugural 2010 date. The first festival was held at the National Orange Show Events Center in San Bernardino, California. Insomniac Events announced Beyond Wonderland “serving as a springtime sister festival to Nocturnal Wonderland.” Fans of Insomniac Events called for a return to the past vibrant environment that the Nocturnal Festival once hailed. Insomniac believed Beyond Wonderland could provide this environment. With the success of Nocturnal Festival, Insomniac introduced the Wonderland series with Beyond Wonderland as its first expansion from the Nocturnal Festival, promising to "return to the amazing hues and vibrance of our original Wonderland event."

The festival features multiple stages of electronic dance music artists with such genres as: House, Trance, Dubstep, Drum and Bass, and Ambient. The festival has also been known for features such as a light maze, many modern art sculptures, and poi dancers. As the festival continues to grow, new interactive additions are added each year to help enhance the experience, such as various dancing characters and aesthetic decorations.

As Insomniac Events continued to grow, new art installations, characters, and themes that focused more on the Alice in Wonderland motif became the aesthetic for Beyond Wonderland. When Insomniac expanded Beyond Wonderland to include camping in 2015, Beyond seemed to be a second wind for festival-goers who had experienced the Nocturnal Series in the Fall prior. However, when Beyond was moved from the San Manuel Amphitheater back to the NOS Center, it no longer offered camping.

== Past events ==
=== San Bernardino, CA – March 20, 2010 ===
The inaugural Beyond Wonderland was held at NOS Events Center in San Bernardino, California on March 20, 2010, to a sold-out crowd.

Notable artists on the lineup included Sander van Doorn, Paul van Dyk, Groove Armada, Robbie Rivera, Caspa, Pendulum, and Wippenberg.

=== San Bernardino, CA – March 19, 2011 ===
The second annual Beyond Wonderland was a great success, with another completely sold-out show at NOS Events Center in San Bernardino, California.

Notable artists on the lineup included Calvin Harris, Dirty South, Dirtyphonics, Datsik, Infected Mushroom, Kaskade, Cosmic Gate, Noisia, and Showtek.

=== Seattle, WA – May 14, 2011 ===
The first Beyond Wonderland to be held in the state of Washington took place at the WAMU Theatre.

Notable artists on the lineup included David Guetta, LMFAO, A-Trak, Datsik, Porter Robinson, and Gareth Emery. Beyond Wonderland marked Guetta's first appearance in Seattle.

=== San Bernardino, CA – March 17, 2012 ===
The third annual Beyond Wonderland was a great success, with another completely sold-out show at NOS Events Center in San Bernardino, CA with a special showing of A State Of Trance 550 with notable artists such as Armin van Buuren, Gareth Emery, Aly & Fila, Arty, Shogun, John O'Callaghan, Sied van Riel, and Fei Fei.

Other notable artists on the lineup throughout the festival included Dirty South, Hardwell, ATB, Magnetic Man, John Digweed, Netsky, Sidney Samson, and Steve Aoki.

This year marked the first year of Beyond Wonderland being expanded to Beyond Socal and Beyond Bay Area.

=== Oakland, CA – September 29, 2012 ===
The first Beyond Wonderland to be held in Northern California was located at the O.co Coliseum parking lot in Oakland, CA. The lineup included artists such as Alesso, Sander Van Doorn, ATB, and Thomas Gold, amongst others.

=== San Bernardino, CA – March 16, 2013 ===
The fourth annual Beyond Wonderland Socal saw a change of scenery, moving from the NOS Events Center to the San Manuel Amphitheater.

Notable artists on the lineup throughout the festival included Afrojack, Arty, Dash Berlin, David Guetta, Markus Schulz, and Steve Angello.

=== Mountain View, CA – September 28 & 29, 2013 ===
The second Beyond Wonderland Bay Area was held in Northern California, this edition of Beyond Wonderland was held in Mountain View at the Shoreline Amphitheatre and was the first Beyond event to span two days. Roughly 40,000 fans attended the event for two days. Over 100 people were arrested, with people being charged with drug possession, drunkenness, illegal drug use, and furnishing.

Notable artists on the lineup included David Guetta, Avicii, Zeds Dead, Gareth Emery, Hardwell, Dash Berlin, Tiesto, Calvin Harris, Benny Benassi, Carnage, and Datsik.

=== Mountain View, CA – September 20 & 21, 2014 ===
The third Beyond Wonderland Bay Area to be held in Northern California, this edition of Beyond Wonderland was again held in Mountain View at the Shoreline Amphitheatre and again spanned two days. More than sixty people were arrested due to noise complaints and drug possession.

=== San Bernardino, CA – March 20, 2015 ===
Over 60 acts were performing on this two-day festival at the San Manuel Amphitheater, which was visited by an estimated 70,000 fans. The lineup featured artists such as [Benny Benassi], [John Digweed], and foreign acts as such as hardstyle duo D-Block and S-Te-Fan, or DBSTF. At this festival there were reports of a 22-year-old man that died from a seizure. Additionally, 300 people were arrested and 32 people were hospitalized.

This 5th anniversary of Beyond Wonderland Socal was the first year the festival offered camping options for the festival. With the success of camping options at Nocturnal Wonderland the year prior, Insomniac expanded the camping experience to Beyond Wonderland as well. The campground offered a new layer of festival-going that included day time activities before the festival began. Yoga, arts and crafts, and a silent disco were all different options for campers in this year of Beyond Wonderland.

=== Mountain View, CA – September 26 & 27, 2015 ===
The fourth Beyond Wonderland Bay Area to be held in Northern California, this edition of Beyond Wonderland was again held in Mountain View at the Shoreline Amphitheatre and again spanned two days. The lineup included Calvin Harris, Tiësto, Loadstar, Knife Party, and Yellow Claw.

=== San Bernardino, CA – March 18 & 19, 2016 ===
The sixth Beyond Wonderland Socal was held at the Glen Helen Amphitheater—at the time the San Manuel Amphiteater. This year of Beyond Wonderland Socal offered a new type of format for music festivals, expanding into the various music label brands of Insomniac Events, specifically the Bassrush and Dreamstate brands. In this year of Beyond Socal, Insomniac created curated stages by the two brands to feature the various artists under each label. This year featured an expansion of the campgrounds that were introduced in the year prior, and featured interactive art and activities in a whole new light to expand on the Beyond experience.

The Beyond Wonderland Bay Area series was cancelled this year along with EDC Puerto Rico, in an effort to "focus on exploring new cities and enhancing the experience at some of our other festivals," as stated by founder Pasquale Rotella. This marked the last year of a Beyond Wonderland Socal and Bay Area.

=== San Bernardino, CA – March 24 & 25, 2017 ===
The seventh Beyond Wonderland was again held at the Glen Helen Amphitheater. In this year of the Beyond series, Insomniac Events created the "Endless Sea," featuring an aquatic aesthetic throughout the festival. Expanding from the typical Alice in Wonderland aesthetic that had been seen in years prior, this year of Beyond showed an expansion of immersive experiences and interaction from performers and art pieces.

=== San Bernardino, CA – March 16 & 17, 2018 ===
The eighth Beyond Wonderland saw a change of venue to one of its former venues, the NOS (National Orange Show) in San Bernardino. This year of Beyond featured acts such as Tiesto, Kayzo, and Chris Lake. Because of the venue change, Beyond Wonderland no longer offered camping starting in 2018.

=== San Bernardino, CA – March 22 & 23, 2019 ===
The ninth Beyond Socal was at the NOS Events Center. This year marked a good year in ticket sales for Beyond, with the first day selling out in less than 24 hours. It featured a good amount of musical surprises, such as Deadmau5, REZZ, and ZHU. as well as a return to the classic Alice in Wonderland aesthetic that characterized the Beyond series.

=== George, WA – October 1 & 2, 2021 ===
The debut of Beyond Wonderland at The Gorge Amphitheatre in George, Washington. This year of Beyond featured acts such as Alison Wonderland, Dr. Fresch, The Chainsmokers, Alan Walker, and Wax Motif. Because of COVID-19 proof of vaccination or a negative test was required for entry. The festival's debut at The Gorge came after the cancellation of Paradiso Festival, another EDM festival held at the amphitheatre which was co-promoted by Insomniac with USC Events.

=== San Bernardino, CA – March 25 & 26, 2022 ===
The 11th Beyond Wonderland was held at NOS Events Center

=== George, WA – June 18 & 19, 2022 ===
Second appearance of Beyond Wonderland at The Gorge Amphitheatre.

=== George, WA – June 17, 2023 ===
Originally the show was scheduled for June 17 and 18, but due to a mass shooting that occurred outside The Gorge Amphitheatre on June 17, the June 18 show was canceled.

=== San Bernardino, CA – March 22 & 23, 2024 ===
The 12th Beyond Wonderland was held at NOS Events Center. 2024 was a good year for ticket sales, which were sold out in about 2 weeks. Big artists, such as Subtronics, Sullivan King, Slander, Dabin, and The Chainsmokers appeared at the event. Overcrowding at the venue was a major problem with about 1500 people coming over the fence into the venue. Walking around felt as if there was little space and no open areas. Despite the overcrowding, attendees stated the vibes, including the Alice in Wonderland ambience, and production met event standards.
