= Lewis Mokler =

Musical artist (born 1993)

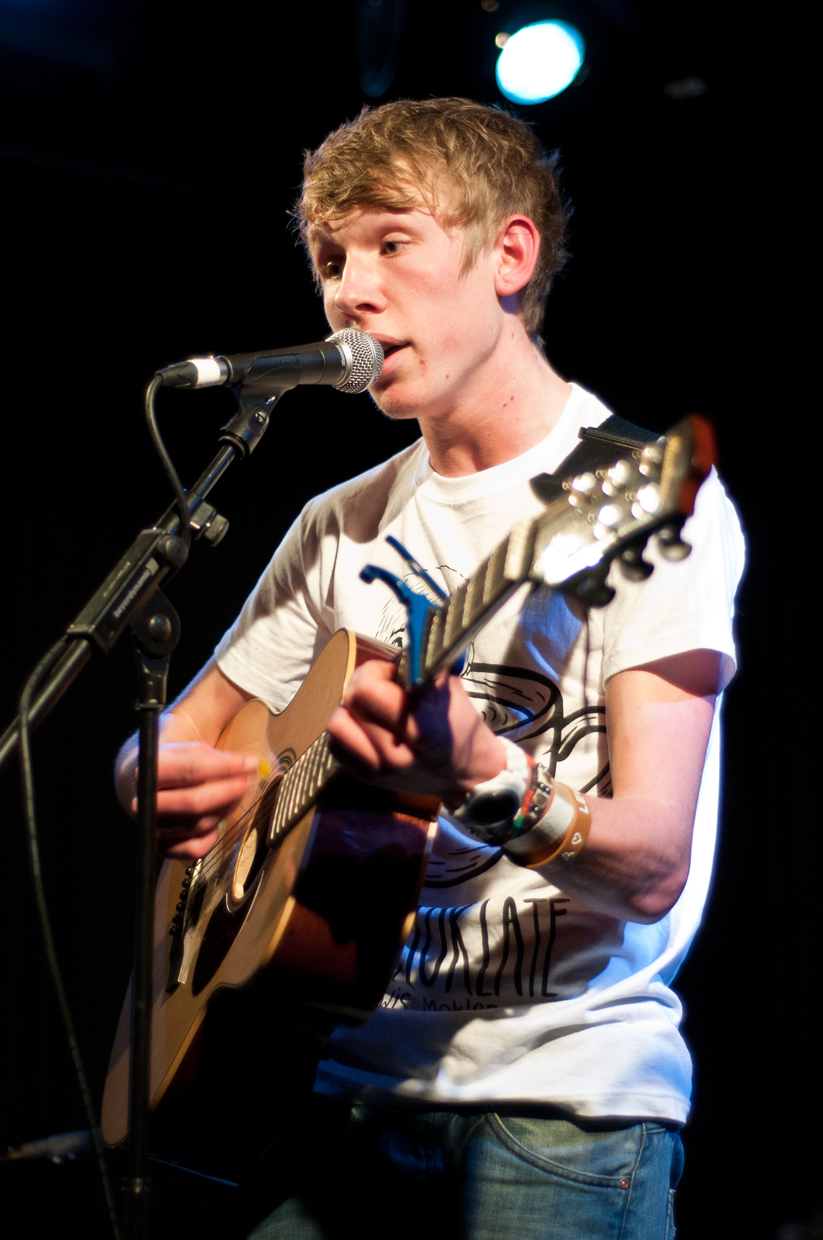
- Lewis Mokler

Background information
- Also known as: HUNTAR
- Born: Lewis David Mokler; 20 May 1993 (age 33)
- Origin: London, England
- Genres: Alternative, Indie
- Occupation: Singer · songwriter
- Instruments: Vocals, guitar, keyboard
- Years active: 2010–present
- Label: Glassnote Records · Liberator Music / Good Soldier · Good Soldier · The Hunger

Lewis David Mokler (born 20 May 1993), also known as HUNTAR, is an English alternative/indie singer and songwriter.

== Early life ==
Lewis Mokler began singing at an early age, performing covers in karaoke pubs, before busking around his hometown and in Cambridge. Soon after Mokler was given an acoustic guitar, teaching himself to play and performing at various open mic nights around Suffolk. In April 2011 Mokler performed at The Doodle Bar in Bury St Edmunds where he was spotted by local manager & promoter Joe Weaver, and the two began working with each other. His brother, Kian Mokler, was also an inspiration to Lewis.

== Music career ==
Mokler released three free demo EPs over the course of 2011 before entering local battle of the bands competition, BurySOUND. After being the first solo artist to win the competition since it began in 1998, Mokler began to get regular gig slots around East Anglia before being asked to support more established artists such as Lester Clayton, Ryan Keen, Antonio Lulic, and Jake Morley.

Mokler released his debut album Fingertips on 25 June 2012, which on its first day reached number 6 in the iTunes singer-songwriter chart, leading to praise from fellow musicians Ed Sheeran & Lewis Watson. In October 2012 Lewis Mokler began his first UK tour alongside local singer-songwriter Adam Moss, releasing a 4-track collaboration EP together to coincide with the tour.

After performing 177 gigs in 2012, Mokler entered the studio to record the Skybound EP which was released on 8 April 2013, reaching number 4 in the UK iTunes singer-songwriter chart & number 59 in the US iTunes singer-songwriter charts. The first single Word By Word was co-written with Welsh musician Amy Wadge, famous for her Songs I Wrote With Amy EP collaboration alongside Ed Sheeran.

In 2014 he no longer made music under the name "Lewis Mokler", but started under the name "HUNTAR". He released his first EP Bitter as HUNTAR in 2014, followed by Love I Know and Autumn in 2015. Multiple artists made remixes of his EPs, which are Mokler's third and forth EP, BITTAR and Rmxs respectively.

After having released several singles in 2016 and 2017, he finally released his debut album Your Favorite Worst Mistake on 15 September 2017. His second album The Ride was released December 2018. No music came out for a while until 2020, when he released two singles; "Tonight" with TW3LV and "Say Anything" with HRTLESS.

HUNTAR's song "Anyway" was featured in the EA Sports game FIFA 17.

== Live performances ==
He has performed at a number of UK summer music festivals over the years, including Summer Jam Music Festival in Torquay alongside Lethal Bizzle & Boy Better Know, as well as headlining the Access To Music stage at Latitude Festival in Suffolk. He in total performed 177 gigs in 2012.

He has so far supported a number of successful musicians such as Ryan Keen, Antonio Lulic, Lester Clayton, Jake Morley, Lewis Watson, Ethan Ash, Sion Russell Jones, Leddra Chapman, Hobbie Stuart and Bipolar Sunshine.

== Releases ==
=== 2011–2013: Lewis Mokler ===
==== EPs ====
- "Beginners Luck EP" (May 2011) (Self-release)
- "Live For Today EP" (July 2011) (Self-release)
- "Lost & Found EP" (October 2011) (Self-release)
- "The Penguins & Turtles EP" (October 2012) (Toonteen Industries)
- "Skybound EP" (April 2013) (Toonteen Industries) – No. 4 UK iTunes Singer-Songwriter Chart, No. 72 iTunes Chart & No. 59 US iTunes Singer-Songwriter Chart.

==== Albums ====
- Fingertips (25 June 2012) (Toonteen Industries) – No. 6 UK iTunes Singer-Songwriter Chart

=== 2014–present: HUNTAR ===
==== EPs ====
- Bitter (5 December 2014)
- Love I know (1 May 2015)
- BITTAR (2015)
- Rmxs (2015)
- Autumn (10 July 2015)

==== Albums ====
- Your Favorite Worst Mistake (15 September 2017) (Glassnote Records)
- The Ride (7 December 2018) (Glassnote Records)
