= PRMD Music =

2013–2019 Swedish electronic music label

- Founded: February 1, 2013; 13 years ago
- Founder: Ash Pournouri
- Defunct: November 25, 2019; 6 years ago
- Status: Inactive
- Distributor: Alternative Distribution Alliance (ADA)
- Genre: Future bass; EDM; House; Hip-hop; Indie dance
- Country of origin: Sweden (de facto); United States (de jure) (Note: PRMD business filings were only found in the US, and does not appear on Bolagsverket (Government of Sweden's business registry) after multiple attempts to query for verification.)
- Location: Stockholm, Sweden; New York City, New York, U.S.
- Official website: www.prmd.com

PRMD (/ˈpɪrəmɪd/ Pyramid) Music was a Swedish-American independent, electronic music record label and music publisher well known for releasing house music records. The label was home to artists such as Avicii, Cazzette, and Syn Cole.

== History ==
On February 1, 2013, PRMD was founded and incorporated as a Limited liability company (LLC) in Delaware by Iranian-Swedish record producer and talent agency manager Ash Pournouri. An announcement to several news outlets was then released in April 2013. Pournouri founded the label for three reasons: "to identify and develop talented producers and artists, taking them first to fans", make the artists marketable through "new paradigms, creative brand partnerships and front running third party platforms", and to include a discography containing "so many different types of [music genres]". Seven months later, the record label announced a partnership with Alternative Distribution Alliance (ADA) to provide the label and its artists "digital & physical distribution, and marketing services".

PRMD's main headquarters was located in Stockholm, Sweden, and was also home to its four recording studios and video production facilities. PRMD also had an additional location in New York City headed by the record label's Chief operating officer Victor Lee.

In 2014, PRMD signed a music publishing deal with Imagem Music. This meant that any song released on PRMD's discography would, therefore, grant Imagem full, joint ownership to the rights.

In 2015, PRMD began to include non-Electronic music genres such as Hip-hop and Indie dance to its discography. It was part of Pournouri's shift away from releasing "four-to-the-floor beats [played on] festival stages", and to reflect Pournouri and the label's attention towards hip hop.

In 2017, Pournouri founded "Self Made": a two-month long music competition contest for aspiring and unsigned artists that would be aired on Kanal 5 (Swedish TV channel). The winner would land a "50-50 record deal with [the label]... and 225,000 kronor (equivalent to 25,000 US dollars) in prize money." Frida Elsa won the competition and released a total of three singles on the label, including her most recent one called "Luxury".

The label's final release was Vincent's For You EP on February 19, 2019. On November 25, 2019, PRMD dissolved via its filing with the California Secretary of State. (Note: https://bizfileonline.sos.ca.gov/api/report/GetImageByNum/207230060203205162078046059021198187195066159163)

== Artists ==
- Almand
- Ashley Wallbridge
- Avicii
- Buster Moe
- Caden Jester
- Cazzette
- Cold Chilling Collective
- Cosmos & Creature
- Dear David
- Didrick
- Dusk Till Dawn
- Frida Elsa
- Glassio
- Ghasper
- Harber
- Hotel Garuda
- HtPkt
- Ishi
- Jaydon Lewis
- K?d
- Morten Breum
- Ninski
- PG-13
- Pls&TY
- R.LUM.R
- Spencer Brown
- Suave
- Syn Cole
- Tundran
- Vincent
- White Cliffs
- Wolfgang Gartner
- Yetep

== See also ==
- List of record labels
- List of electronic music record labels
