= The Chainsmokers discography =

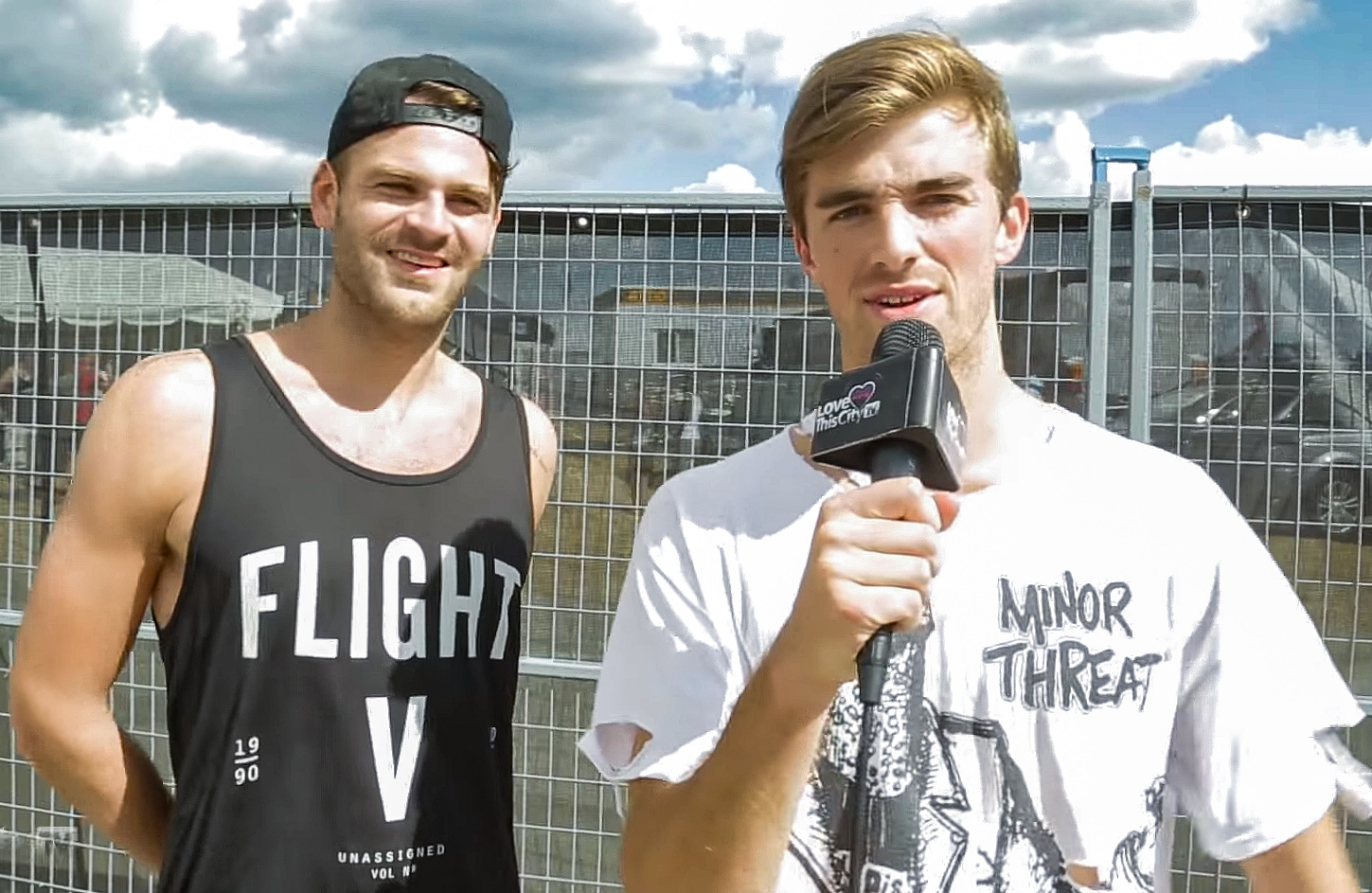
- The Chainsmokers during an interview in 2015
- Studio albums: 5
- EPs: 6
- Singles: 44
- Music videos: 31
- Remixes: 39
- Promotional singles: 3
- Soundtracks: 1

The discography of American DJ duo the Chainsmokers consists of five studio albums, one soundtrack, six extended plays, forty four singles, three promotional singles, thirty-three music videos, and thirty-eight remixes.

Their 2014 song "#Selfie" became their first ever single to chart in a country, peaking at number two in Sweden, number sixteen on the US Billboard Hot 100 chart, number three in Australia, and number eleven in the United Kingdom. They released their debut EP, Bouquet, in October 2015. Their following single "Roses" reached the top ten on the Billboard Hot 100, while "Don't Let Me Down" became their first top five single. Later in 2016, the duo released another single "Closer". It became the Chainsmokers' first number-one single on the Billboard Hot 100, staying at number one for 12 consecutive weeks, and in the top five for 26 consecutive weeks. They released their second EP, Collage, in November 2016. In April 2017, they released their debut studio album Memories...Do Not Open, which debuted at number one on the US Billboard 200 and was certified platinum after five months.

They released their second album Sick Boy on December 14, 2018. It features the single "This Feeling" featuring Kelsea Ballerini. Their third album World War Joy was released on December 6, 2019. It features the singles "Who Do You Love" featuring 5 Seconds of Summer and "Call You Mine" featuring Bebe Rexha. Their fourth album So Far So Good, was released on May 13, 2022. It features the single "High".

Their fifth album Summertime Friends was released on October 20, 2023. It features the single "Jungle" with Alok. They released their fifth EP No Hard Feelings on May 10, 2024. It features the single "Addicted", collaborating with Zerb and featuring Ink. Their sixth EP Breathe was released on October 24, 2025.

== Albums ==
=== Studio albums ===
List of studio albums, with selected chart positions
Title	Details	Peak chart positions										Certifications
Title	Details	US	AUS	BEL (FL)	CAN	DEN	ITA	NOR	NZ	SWE	UK	Certifications
Memories...Do Not Open	Released: April 7, 2017; Label: Disruptor, Columbia; Format: CD, LP, digital download, streaming	1	4	2	1	7	8	2	4	3	3	RIAA: 2× Platinum; ARIA: Gold; BPI: Gold; FIMI: Platinum; GLF: Platinum; IFPI DEN: Platinum; IFPI NOR: Platinum; MC: 2× Platinum
Sick Boy	Released: December 14, 2018; Label: Disruptor, Columbia; Format: CD, digital download, streaming	—	72	—	—	—	—	6	—	—	—	RIAA: Gold; BPI: Silver; IFPI DEN: Gold; MC: Platinum
World War Joy	Released: December 6, 2019; Label: Disruptor, Columbia; Format: CD, digital download, streaming	65	19	—	30	—	—	—	25	16	—	RIAA: Gold; ARIA: Gold; IFPI DEN: Gold; MC: Gold
So Far So Good	Released: May 13, 2022; Label: Disruptor, Columbia; Format: CD, LP, digital download, streaming	106	—	96	45	—	—	—	—	—	—	
Summertime Friends	Released: October 20, 2023; Label: Disruptor, Columbia; Format: Digital download, streaming	—	—	—	—	—	—	—	—	—	—	
"—" denotes a recording that did not chart or was not released in that territory.

=== Remix albums ===
Title	Details
So Far So Good (Lofi Remixes)	Released: October 21, 2022; Label: Disruptor, Columbia; Format: Digital download, streaming

=== Soundtrack albums ===
Title	Details
Words on Bathroom Walls (with Andrew Hollander)	Released: August 21, 2020; Label: Disruptor, Columbia; Format: Digital download, streaming

== Extended plays ==
List of extended plays, with selected chart positions and certifications
Title	Details	Peak chart positions								Certifications
Title	Details	US	US Dance	AUS	CAN	DEN	KOR	NZ	UK	Certifications
Bouquet	Released: October 23, 2015; Label: Disruptor, Columbia; Format: CD, LP, digital download, streaming	31	2	—	18	—	—	—	—	RIAA: Gold
Collage	Released: November 4, 2016; Label: Disruptor, Columbia; Format: CD, LP, digital download, streaming	6	1	23	2	—	7	7	49	RIAA: 3× Platinum; ARIA: Gold; BPI: Silver
Sick Boy (Note: A single from The Chainsmokers' second studio album was released to digital retailers almost every month in 2018, atop a new EP containing each previous single. Sick Boy EP includes the first four singles released for the Sick Boy album. EPs not shown in this table are listed below in chronological order of release: Sick Boy...You Owe Me; Sick Boy...Everybody Hates Me; Sick Boy...Side Effects; Sick Boy...Save Yourself; Sick Boy...This Feeling; Sick Boy...Siren; Sick Boy...Beach House)	Released: April 20, 2018; Label: Disruptor, Columbia; Format: Digital download, streaming	53	1	87	20	33	—	—	—	
World War Joy (Note: Singles from the Chainsmokers' third studio album were released to digital retailers atop a new EP containing each previous single. World War Joy EP includes the first four singles released for the World War Joy album. EPs not shown in this table are listed below in chronological order of release: World War Joy...Kills You Slowly; World War Joy...Do You Mean; World War Joy...Takeaway; World War Joy...Push My Luck)	Released: May 31, 2019; Label: Disruptor, Columbia; Format: Digital download, streaming	48	1	65	35	31	—	—	—	
No Hard Feelings	Released: May 10, 2024; Label: Disruptor, Columbia; Format: Digital download, streaming	—	5	—	—	—	—	—	—	
Breathe	Released: October 24, 2025; Label: Disruptor, Columbia; Format: Digital download, streaming	—	—	—	—	—	—	—	—	
Love Is Kind (with Oaks)	Scheduled: May 8, 2026; Label: Disruptor, Columbia; Format: Digital download, streaming	—	—	—	—	—	—	—	—	
"—" denotes a recording that did not chart or was not released in that territory.

== Singles ==
List of singles, with selected chart positions and certifications, showing year released and album name
Title	Year	Peak chart positions										Certifications	Album
Title	Year	US	AUS	BEL (FL)	CAN	DEN	ITA	NOR	NZ	SWE	UK	Certifications	Album
"Erase" (featuring Priyanka Chopra)	2012	—	—	—	—	—	—	—	—	—	—		Non-album singles
"The Rookie"	2013	—	—	—	—	—	—	—	—	—	—		Non-album singles
"#Selfie"	2014	16	3	14	13	9	69	3	12	2	11	RIAA: Platinum; ARIA: Platinum; BPI: Silver; FIMI: Platinum; GLF: 3× Platinum; IFPI DEN: Platinum; MC: Platinum; RMNZ: Gold	Non-album singles
"Kanye" (featuring SirenXX)	2014	—	—	—	—	—	—	—	—	—	—		Non-album singles
"Polkadots"	2014	—	—	—	—	—	—	—	—	—	—		Non-album singles
"Let You Go" (featuring Great Good Fine Ok)	2015	—	—	—	—	—	—	—	—	—	—		Non-album singles
"Good Intentions" (featuring BullySongs)	2015	—	—	—	—	—	—	—	—	—	—		Bouquet
"Roses" (featuring Rozes)	2015	6	5	22	6	29	42	8	8	13	16	RIAA: 8× Platinum; ARIA: 4× Platinum; BPI: Platinum; BRMA: Gold; FIMI: 2× Platinum; GLF: 4× Platinum; IFPI DEN: Platinum; IFPI NOR: Platinum; MC: 5× Platinum; RMNZ: 5× Platinum	Bouquet
"Waterbed" (featuring Waterbed)	2015	—	—	—	—	—	—	—	—	—	—		Bouquet
"Split (Only U)" (with Tiësto)	2015	—	—	— (Note: "Split (Only U)" did not enter the Flemish Ultratop chart, but peaked at number 63 on the Walloon Ultratip chart.)	—	—	—	—	—	—	—		Non-album single
"Until You Were Gone" (with Tritonal featuring Emily Warren)	2015	—	—	—	—	—	—	—	—	—	—	RIAA: Gold; MC: Platinum	Bouquet
"New York City"	2015	—	—	—	—	—	—	—	—	—	—	RIAA: Gold	Bouquet
"Don't Let Me Down" (featuring Daya)	2016	3	3	4	4	15	7	5	2	5	2	RIAA: 12× Platinum; ARIA: 7× Platinum; BPI: 4× Platinum; BRMA: 3× Platinum; FIMI: 6× Platinum; GLF: 6× Platinum; IFPI DEN: 3× Platinum; MC: 9× Platinum; RMNZ: 7× Platinum	Collage
"Inside Out" (featuring Charlee)	2016	—	—	—	72	—	—	—	—	—	—	RIAA: Gold; ARIA: Gold; MC: Gold	Collage
"Closer" (featuring Halsey)	2016	1	1	1	1	1	2	1	1	1	1	RIAA: 18× Platinum; ARIA: 20× Platinum; BPI: 5× Platinum; BRMA: 3× Platinum; FIMI: 6× Platinum; GLF: 5× Platinum; IFPI DEN: 3× Platinum; IFPI NOR: 3× Platinum; MC: Diamond; RMNZ: 10× Platinum	Collage
"All We Know" (featuring Phoebe Ryan)	2016	18	8	43	14	35	30	10	10	19	24	RIAA: Platinum; ARIA: 3× Platinum; BPI: Silver; FIMI: Platinum; GLF: 2× Platinum; IFPI DEN: Gold; MC: 2× Platinum; RMNZ: 2× Platinum	Collage
"Setting Fires" (featuring Xylø)	2016	71	50	10	35	—	—	—	—	92	55	RIAA: Gold; ARIA: Platinum; MC: Platinum; RMNZ: Gold	Collage
"Paris"	2017	6	4	5	2	2	9	3	5	2	5	RIAA: 5× Platinum; ARIA: 4× Platinum; BPI: 2× Platinum; BRMA: Platinum; FIMI: 3× Platinum; GLF: 5× Platinum; IFPI DEN: 2× Platinum; IFPI NOR: 2× Platinum; MC: 4× Platinum; RMNZ: 3× Platinum	Memories...Do Not Open
"Something Just Like This" (with Coldplay)	2017	3	2	2	3	5	3	5	5	4	2	RIAA: 13× Platinum; ARIA: 17× Platinum; BPI: 6× Platinum; BRMA: 3× Platinum; FIMI: 7× Platinum; GLF: 9× Platinum; IFPI DEN: 3× Platinum; IFPI NOR: 3× Platinum; MC: 6× Platinum; RMNZ: 8× Platinum	Memories...Do Not Open
"Honest"	2017	77	—	— (Note: "Honest" did not enter the Flemish Ultratop chart, but peaked at number 21 on the Ultratip chart.)	93	—	—	—	— (Note: "Honest" did not enter the NZ Top 40 Singles Chart, but peaked at number 2 on the NZ Heatseeker Singles Chart.)	— (Note: "Honest" did not enter the Swedish Singellista Chart, but peaked at number 4 on the Swedish Heatseekers Chart.)	—	RIAA: Gold; ARIA: Gold	Memories...Do Not Open
"Sick Boy"	2018	65	37	30	29	13	61	3	25	8	35	RIAA: Platinum; ARIA: Platinum; BPI: Silver; BRMA: Gold; FIMI: Gold; IFPI DEN: Platinum; MC: Platinum; RMNZ: Platinum	Sick Boy
"You Owe Me"	2018	— (Note: "You Owe Me" did not enter the Billboard Hot 100, but peaked at number four on the Bubbling Under Hot 100 Singles chart.)	73	—	74	—	—	—	— (Note: "You Owe Me" did not enter the NZ Top 40 Singles Chart, but peaked at number one on the NZ Heatseeker Singles Chart.)	55	97	MC: Gold	Sick Boy
"Everybody Hates Me"	2018	100	50	—	71	—	96	33	— (Note: "Everybody Hates Me" did not enter the NZ Top 40 Singles Chart, but peaked at number four on the NZ Heatseeker Singles Chart.)	32	81	RIAA: Gold; MC: Gold	Sick Boy
"Somebody" (featuring Drew Love)	2018	— (Note: "Somebody" did not enter the Billboard Hot 100, but peaked at number five on the Bubbling Under Hot 100 Singles chart.)	43	—	74	—	—	—	— (Note: "Somebody" did not enter the NZ Top 40 Singles Chart, but peaked at number six on the NZ Heatseeker Singles Chart.)	67	87	RIAA: Gold; ARIA: Gold; MC: Platinum; RMNZ: Gold	Sick Boy
"Side Effects" (featuring Emily Warren)	2018	66	61	44	39	—	—	—	—	100	50	RIAA: Gold; ARIA: Gold; MC: Platinum; RMNZ: Gold	Sick Boy
"Save Yourself" (with Nghtmre)	2018	—	—	—	—	—	—	—	—	—	—		Sick Boy
"This Feeling" (featuring Kelsea Ballerini)	2018	50	17	— (Note: "This Feeling" did not enter the Flemish Ultratop chart, but peaked at number 11 on the Flemish Ultratip chart.)	34	—	—	—	23	30	63	RIAA: 3× Platinum; ARIA: Platinum; BPI: Silver; MC: 3× Platinum; RMNZ: 2× Platinum	Sick Boy
"Siren" (with Aazar)	2018	—	—	—	—	—	—	—	— (Note: "Siren" did not enter the NZ Top 40 Singles Chart, but peaked at number 34 on the NZ Hot Singles Chart.)	—	—		Sick Boy
"Beach House"	2018	—	89	—	—	—	—	—	— (Note: "Beach House" did not enter the NZ Top 40 Singles Chart, but peaked at number two on the NZ Hot Singles Chart.)	56	—		Sick Boy
"Hope" (featuring Winona Oak)	2018	— (Note: "Hope" did not enter the Billboard Hot 100, but peaked at number 24 on the Bubbling Under Hot 100 Singles chart.)	36	— (Note: "Hope" did not enter the Flemish Ultratop chart, but peaked at number 8 on the Flemish Ultratip chart.)	64	—	—	40	27	63	89	RIAA: Gold; ARIA: Gold; MC: Platinum; RMNZ: Platinum	Sick Boy
"Who Do You Love" (featuring 5 Seconds of Summer)	2019	52	13	21	35	—	—	30	26	19	34	RIAA: 2× Platinum; ARIA: 2× Platinum; BPI: Silver; IFPI DEN: Gold; MC: 2× Platinum; RMNZ: Platinum	World War Joy
"Kills You Slowly"	2019	—	85	—	—	—	—	—	— (Note: "Kills You Slowly" did not enter the NZ Top 40 Singles Chart, but peaked at number nine on the NZ Hot Singles Chart.)	98	—		World War Joy
"Do You Mean" (featuring Ty Dolla $ign and Bülow)	2019	—	—	—	—	—	—	—	— (Note: "Do You Mean" did not enter the NZ Top 40 Singles Chart, but peaked at number 15 on the NZ Hot Singles Chart.)	91	—	MC: Gold	World War Joy
"Call You Mine" (featuring Bebe Rexha)	2019	56	26	— (Note: "Call You Mine" did not enter the Flemish Ultratop chart, but peaked at number four on the Flemish Ultratip chart.)	42	—	—	22	32	37	50	RIAA: 2× Platinum; ARIA: Platinum; BPI: Silver; IFPI DEN: Gold; IFPI NOR: Platinum; MC: Platinum; RMNZ: Platinum	World War Joy
"Takeaway" (Note: "Takeaway" also features on Illenium's third studio album Ascend.) (with Illenium featuring Lennon Stella)	2019	69	32	36	31	—	—	14	— (Note: "Takeaway" did not enter the NZ Top 40 Singles Chart, but peaked at number three on the NZ Hot Singles Chart.)	38	64	RIAA: 2× Platinum; ARIA: Platinum; BPI: Silver; BRMA: Gold; FIMI: Gold; IFPI DEN: Gold; MC: Platinum; RMNZ: Platinum	World War Joy
"Push My Luck"	2019	—	—	—	—	—	—	40	— (Note: "Push My Luck" did not enter the NZ Top 40 Singles Chart, but peaked at number 15 on the NZ Hot Singles Chart.)	— (Note: "Push My Luck" did not enter the Swedish Singellista Chart, but peaked at number 11 on the Swedish Heatseeker Chart.)	—		World War Joy
"The Reaper" (featuring Amy Shark)	2019	—	47	—	—	—	—	—	— (Note: "The Reaper" did not enter the NZ Top 40 Singles Chart, but peaked at number 13 on the NZ Hot Singles Chart.)	—	—	ARIA: Platinum	World War Joy
"Family" (with Kygo)	2019	—	—	— (Note: "Family" did not enter the Flemish Ultratop chart, but peaked at number two on the Flemish Ultratip chart.)	—	—	—	31	— (Note: "Family" did not enter the NZ Top 40 Singles Chart, but peaked at number seven on the NZ Hot Singles Chart.)	60	—		World War Joy
"See the Way" (featuring Sabrina Claudio)	2019	—	—	—	—	—	—	—	—	—	—		World War Joy
"P.S. I Hope You're Happy" (featuring Blink-182)	2019	—	—	—	—	—	—	—	—	—	—		World War Joy
"High"	2022	57	65	41	36	—	—	—	— (Note: "High" did not enter the NZ Top 40 Singles Chart, but peaked at number four on the NZ Hot Singles Chart.)	— (Note: "High" did not enter the Swedish Singellista Chart, but peaked at number 1 on the Swedish Heatseeker Chart.)	—	RIAA: Gold; MC: Gold	So Far So Good
"iPad"	2022	—	—	—	—	—	—	—	— (Note: "iPad" did not enter the NZ Top 40 Singles Chart, but peaked at number 13 on the NZ Hot Singles Chart.)	—	—		So Far So Good
"Riptide"	2022	—	—	—	—	—	—	—	—	—	—		So Far So Good
"I Love U"	2022	—	—	—	—	—	—	—	— (Note: "I Love U" did not enter the NZ Top 40 Singles Chart, but peaked at number 19 on the NZ Hot Singles Chart.)	—	—		So Far So Good
"The Fall" (with Ship Wrek)	2022	—	—	—	—	—	—	—	—	—	—		So Far So Good
"Why Can't You Wait" (with Bob Moses)	2022	—	—	—	—	—	—	—	—	—	—		So Far So Good
"Time Bomb"	2022	—	—	—	—	—	—	—	—	—	—		So Far So Good
"Wish on an Eyelash, Pt. 2" (with Mallrat)	2022	—	—	—	—	—	—	—	—	—	—		Non-album singles
"Make Me Feel" (with Cheyenne Giles)	2023	—	—	—	—	—	—	—	— (Note: "Make Me Feel" did not enter the NZ Top 40 Singles Chart, but peaked at number 31 on the NZ Hot Singles Chart.)	—	—		Non-album singles
"Up & Down" (with 347aidan)	2023	—	—	—	—	—	—	—	— (Note: "Up & Down" did not enter the NZ Top 40 Singles Chart, but peaked at number 30 on the NZ Hot Singles Chart.)	—	—		Summertime Friends
"Self Destruction Mode" (with Bludnymph)	2023	—	—	—	—	—	—	—	— (Note: "Self Destruction Mode" did not enter the NZ Top 40 Singles Chart, but peaked at number 32 on the NZ Hot Singles Chart.)	—	—		Summertime Friends
"See You Again" (with Illenium and Carlie Hanson)	2023	—	—	—	—	—	—	—	— (Note: "See You Again" did not enter the NZ Top 40 Singles Chart, but peaked at number 21 on the NZ Hot Singles Chart.)	—	—		Summertime Friends
"Celular" (with Nicky Jam and Maluma)	2023	—	—	—	—	—	—	—	—	—	—		Summertime Friends
"My Bad" (with Shenseea)	2023	—	—	—	—	—	—	—	— (Note: "My Bad" did not enter the NZ Top 40 Singles Chart, but peaked at number 33 on the NZ Hot Singles Chart.)	—	—		Summertime Friends
"Summertime Friends"	2023	—	—	—	—	—	—	—	— (Note: "Summertime Friends" did not enter the NZ Top 40 Singles Chart, but peaked at number 22 on the NZ Hot Singles Chart.)	—	—		Summertime Friends
"Jungle" (with Alok and Mae Stephens)	2023	—	—	17	—	—	—	—	— (Note: "Jungle" did not enter the NZ Top 40 Singles Chart, but peaked at number 29 on the NZ Hot Singles Chart.)	—	—	BRMA: Gold	Summertime Friends
"Fault in the Stars" (with Powfu)	2023	—	—	—	—	—	—	—	—	—	—		Non-album single
"Addicted" (with Zerb featuring Ink)	2024	—	—	—	95	—	—	—	— (Note: "Addicted" did not enter the NZ Top 40 Singles Chart, but peaked at number 18 on the NZ Hot Singles Chart.)	—	50	BPI: Silver; BRMA: Gold; RMNZ: Platinum	No Hard Feelings
"Friday" (with Fridayy)	2024	—	—	—	—	—	—	—	— (Note: "Friday" did not enter the NZ Top 40 Singles Chart, but peaked at number 14 on the NZ Hot Singles Chart.)	—	—		No Hard Feelings
"Don't Lie" (with Kim Petras)	2024	—	—	—	—	—	—	—	— (Note: "Don't Lie" did not enter the NZ Top 40 Singles Chart, but peaked at number 29 on the NZ Hot Singles Chart.)	—	—		Non-album single
"White Wine & Adderall" (with Beau Nox)	2025	—	—	—	—	—	—	—	— (Note: "White Wine & Adderall" did not enter the NZ Top 40 Singles Chart, but peaked at number 34 on the NZ Hot Singles Chart.)	—	—		Breathe
"Helium" (with Anna Sofia)	2025	—	—	—	—	—	—	—	— (Note: "Helium" did not enter the NZ Top 40 Singles Chart, but peaked at number 20 on the NZ Hot Singles Chart.)	—	—		Breathe
"Spaces" (with BUNT. and Izzy Bizu)	2025	—	—	—	—	—	—	—	— (Note: "Spaces" did not enter the NZ Top 40 Singles Chart, but peaked at number 31 on the NZ Hot Singles Chart.)	—	—		Breathe
"Smooth"	2025	—	—	—	—	—	—	—	— (Note: "Smooth" did not enter the NZ Top 40 Singles Chart, but peaked at number 22 on the NZ Hot Singles Chart.)	—	—		Breathe
"All the Time" (with John Summit and Ilsey)	2026	—	—	—	—	—	—	—	— (Note: "All the Time" did not enter the NZ Top 40 Singles Chart, but peaked at number 16 on the NZ Hot Singles Chart.)	—	—		Ctrl Escape
"Echo" (with Oaks)	2026	—	—	—	—	—	—	—	— (Note: "Echo" did not enter the NZ Top 40 Singles Chart, but peaked at number 15 on the NZ Hot Singles Chart.)	—	—		Love Is Kind
"Already Know" (with Oaks)	2026	—	—	—	—	—	—	—	—	—	—		Love Is Kind
"Love Is Kind" (with Oaks)	2026	—	—	—	—	—	—	—	— (Note: "Love Is Kind" did not enter the NZ Top 40 Singles Chart, but peaked at number 24 on the NZ Hot Singles Chart.)	—	—		Love Is Kind
"Inundauswendig" (with Makko)	2026	—	—	—	—	—	—	—	—	—	—		Non-album singles
"Baby"	2026	—	—	—	—	—	—	—	— (Note: "Baby" did not enter the NZ Top 40 Singles Chart, but peaked at number 30 on the NZ Hot Singles Chart.)	—	—		Non-album singles
"Take What You Need"	2026	—	—	—	—	—	—	—	— (Note: "Take What You Need" did not enter the NZ Top 40 Singles Chart, but peaked at number 32 on the NZ Hot Singles Chart.)	—	—		Non-album singles
"—" denotes a recording that did not chart or was not released in that territory.

=== Promotional singles ===
List of promotional singles, with selected chart positions and certifications, showing year released and album name
Title	Year	Peak chart positions								Certifications	Album
Title	Year	US	AUS	BEL (FL)	CAN	ITA	NZ	SWE	UK	Certifications	Album
"The One"	2017	78	36	4	30	36	—	20	63	RIAA: Gold; ARIA: Gold; FIMI: Gold; RMNZ: Gold	Memories...Do Not Open
"Young"	2017	—	—	—	65	—	—	— (Note: "Young" did not enter the Swedish Singellista Chart, but peaked at number 13 on the Swedish Heatseekers Chart.)	—	RIAA: Gold	Memories...Do Not Open
"—" denotes a recording that did not chart or was not released.

== Other charted songs ==
List of other charted songs, with selected chart positions, showing year released and album name
Title	Year	Peak chart positions						Certifications	Album
Title	Year	US Bub.	US Dance	CAN	FRA	NZ Hot	SWE	Certifications	Album
"Break Up Every Night"	2017	7	12	61	—	— (Note: "Break Up Every Night" did not enter the NZ Top 40 or Hot Singles Charts, but peaked at number three on the NZ Heatseeker Singles Chart.)	44		Memories...Do Not Open
"Bloodstream"	2017	18	15	60	—	—	89		Memories...Do Not Open
"Don't Say" (featuring Emily Warren)	2017	—	19	63	—	—	— (Note: "Don’t Say" did not enter the Swedish Singellista Chart, but peaked at number 7 on the Swedish Heatseekers Chart.)		Memories...Do Not Open
"My Type" (featuring Emily Warren)	2017	17	14	66	—	—	—	RIAA: Gold	Memories...Do Not Open
"It Won't Kill Ya" (featuring Louane)	2017	—	24	84	70	—	— (Note: "It Won't Kill Ya" did not enter the Swedish Singellista Chart, but peaked at number 11 on the Swedish Heatseekers Chart.)		Memories...Do Not Open
"Wake Up Alone" (featuring Jhené Aiko)	2017	—	23	—	—	—	—		Memories...Do Not Open
"Last Day Alive" (featuring Florida Georgia Line)	2017	19	16	94	—	—	—		Memories...Do Not Open
"Maradona"	2022	—	31	—	—	—	—		So Far So Good
"Solo Mission"	2022	—	33	—	—	—	—		So Far So Good
"Something Different"	2022	—	36	—	—	—	—		So Far So Good
"If You're Serious"	2022	—	29	—	—	—	—		So Far So Good
"Channel 1"	2022	—	40	—	—	—	—		So Far So Good
"Testing"	2022	—	41	—	—	—	—		So Far So Good
"I Hope You Change Your Mind"	2022	—	43	—	—	—	—		So Far So Good
"Think of Us"	2023	—	31	—	—	—	—		Summertime Friends
"No Shade at Pitti"	2024	—	21	—	—	—	—		No Hard Feelings
"The Cure"	2025	—	20	—	—	—	—		Breathe
"—" denotes a recording that did not chart or was not released in that territory.

== Remixes ==
List of remixes, showing original artists and year released
Title	Year	Original artist(s)
"Around Us"	2013	Jónsi
"We Run the Night"	2013	Tonite Only
"Sleep Alone"	2013	Two Door Cinema Club
"Overdose"	2013	Little Daylight
"Medicine"	2013	Daughter
"Trying to Be Cool"	2013	Phoenix
"Julian"	2013	Say Lou Lou
"Operate"	2013	ASTR
"Dreaming"	2013	Smallpools
"Miss Atomic Bomb"	2013	The Killers
"Last Forever"	2013	Fenech-Soler
"Take Me Home"	2013	Cash Cash (featuring Bebe Rexha)
"We Own the Night"	2013	The Wanted
"Change"	2013	Banks
"Girlfriend"	2013	Icona Pop
"Kids"	2013	Mikky Ekko
"Fix This"	2013	The Colourist
"Habits (Stay High)"	2014	Tove Lo
"Pumpin Blood"	2014	NONONO
"Goodness Gracious"	2014	Ellie Goulding
"Flaws"	2014	Bastille
"Young Hearts"	2014	Strange Talk
"Jealous (I Ain't with It)"	2014	Chromeo
"Wonder"	2014	Adventure Club (featuring The Kite String Tangle)
"Holding onto Heaven"	2014	Foxes
"Like a Drum"	2014	Guy Sebastian
"Step Out"	2014	José González
"I Can't Stop Drinking About You"	2014	Bebe Rexha
"Sway"	2014	Anna of the North
"Open Season"	2014	Josef Salvat
"Sleeping with a Friend"	2014	Neon Trees
"Push"	2014	A-Trak (featuring Andrew Wyatt)
"Real Love"	2015	Clean Bandit and Jess Glynne
"Back to Earth"	2015	Steve Aoki (featuring Fall Out Boy)
"Overload"	2015	Life of Dillon
"Not So Dirty" (The Chainsmokers and Jenaux "Festival Season Is Over and Now You're Broke" Remix)	2015	Who's Who
"I Can't Make You Love Me"	2022	Bon Iver
"Meet Me at Our Spot"	2022	The Anxiety
"Beautiful Things"	2024	Benson Boone
"Band4Band"	2024	Central Cee & Lil Baby
"Girls"	2024	The Dare
"Neverender"	2024	Justice & Tame Impala
"Sailor Song" (The Chainsmokers & TWINSICK Remix)	2024	Gigi Perez
"Messy"	2024	Lola Young
"Moments"	2025	MOIO
"Oysters in My Pocket"	2025	Royel Otis
"Past Lives"	2025	sapientdream & Slushii
"That's So True"	2025	Gracie Abrams
"Pink Pony Club"	2025	Chappell Roan
"Party 4 U"	2025	Charli XCX
"The Fate of Ophelia"	2025	Taylor Swift
"4 Raws"	2025	EsDeeKid
"Back to Friends"	2025	Sombr
"Back on 74"	2025	Jungle

== Songwriting and production credits ==
List of songwriting and production credits
Title	Year	Artist	Album	Contributing member(s)	Contribution
"Summer Love"	2016	The Fooo Conspiracy	FO&O	Andrew Taggart	Production; songwriting
"1-800-273-8255"	2017	Logic featuring Alessia Cara and Khalid	Everybody	Andrew Taggart	Songwriting
"Do You Think About Me"	2017	NVDES	La Nvdité, Vol. 1	Andrew Taggart	Songwriting
"Best of Me"	2017	BTS	Love Yourself: Her	Andrew Taggart	Production; songwriting; guitar; synths; keys
"Addicted"	2017	Shaun Frank featuring Violet Days	Non-album single	Andrew Taggart	Production; songwriting
"Love Is Bigger Than Anything in Its Way"	2017	U2	Songs of Experience	Andrew Taggart	Keyboard
"Trust"	2018	Youngblood Hawke	Non-album singles	Andrew Taggart	Songwriting
"Used to Be"	2021	Steve Aoki and Kiiara featuring Wiz Khalifa	Non-album singles	Alexander Pall and Andrew Taggart	Songwriting
"Good Feelings"	2024	Coldplay and Ayra Starr	Moon Music	Alexander Pall and Andrew Taggart	Songwriting

== Music videos ==
List of music videos, showing year released and director(s)
Title	Year	Director(s)
"#Selfie"	2014	Taylor Stephens & Ike Love Jones
"Kanye"	2014	Niklaus Lange
"Let You Go"	2015	Joe Zohar
"Good Intentions"	2015	Joe Zohar
"Roses" (Version 1)	2015	Rory Kramer
"Roses" (Version 2)	2015	Impossible Brief
"Split (Only U)"	2015	Joe Zohar
"Waterbed"	2015	Joe Zohar
"Until You Were Gone"	2015	Joe Zohar
"Don't Let Me Down"	2016	Marcus Kuhne
"Closer"	2016	Dano Cerny
"Setting Fires"	2016	James 'Zola' Zwadlo
"All We Know"	2016	Rory Kramer
"Paris"	2017	Mister Whitmore
"Sick Boy"	2018	Brewer
"You Owe Me"	2018	Rory Kramer
"Everybody Hates Me"	2018	Rory Kramer
"Somebody" (Version 1)	2018	Jim Batt and Kim Boekbinder
"Somebody" (Version 2)	2018	Rory Kramer
"Side Effects"	2018	Matthew Dillon Cohen
"Save Yourself"	2018	Jeremiah Davis
"This Feeling"	2018	Similar But Different
"Beach House"	2018	Jeremiah Davis
"Hope"	2018	Jeremiah Davis
"Who Do You Love"	2019	Frank Borin
"Kills You Slowly"	2019	Jordan Wozy and Lucas Taggart
"Do You Mean"	2019	Spencer Miller
"Call You Mine"	2019	Dano Cerny
"Takeaway"	2019	Jeremiah Davis
"Push My Luck"	2019	Steven Sebring
"Family"	2019	Jeremiah Davis
"High"	2022	Kid. Studio
"iPad"	2022	Kid. Studio
"I Love U"	2022	Kid. Studio
"Up & Down"	2023	Jeremiah Davis
"Self Destruction Mode"	2023	Jeremiah Davis
"See You Again"	2023	Jeremiah Davis
"My Bad"	2023	Patrick Tohill
"Summertime Friends"	2023	Spencer Miller
"Think Of Us"	2023	Tony Tacheny
"Addicted"	2024	Hunter Lyon
"Friday"	2024	Hunter Lyon
"Green Lights (demo)"	2024	Jeremiah Davis
"Tennis Court"	2024	Hunter Lyon
"Bad Advice"	2024	Hunter Lyon
"No Shade at Pitti"	2024	Jeremiah Davis
"Don't Lie"	2024	
