= Words on Bathroom Walls (soundtrack) =

Words on Bathroom Walls (Original Motion Picture Soundtrack)

Soundtrack album by the Chainsmokers and Andrew Hollander
- Released: August 21, 2020
- Recorded: June 2020
- Genre: Film score
- Length: 42:07
- Label: Disruptor; Columbia
- Producer: Alex Pall; Drew Taggart; Andrew Hollander

The Chainsmokers chronology
World War Joy (2019)	Words on Bathroom Walls (Original Motion Picture Soundtrack) (2020)	So Far So Good (2022)

Andrew Hollander chronology
The Rest of Us (2019)	Words on Bathroom Walls (2020)	Antarctica (2020)

Words on Bathroom Walls (Original Motion Picture Soundtrack) is the soundtrack accompanying the 2020 film Words on Bathroom Walls, directed by Thor Freudenthal and based on the novel of the same name by Julia Walton, starring Charlie Plummer, Andy García, Taylor Russell and AnnaSophia Robb. The album consisted of an original score and songs composed by the Chainsmokers and Andrew Hollander and released through Disruptor Records and Columbia Records on August 21, 2020 alongside the film.

== Background ==
Words on Bathroom Walls featured music contributed by the Chainsmokers—an electronic DJ and record production duo consisting of Alexander "Alex" Pall and Andrew "Drew" Taggart—and Andrew Hollander jointly composing the score. The film marked the duo's debut composition and production for a feature film. Plummer told ABC Audio that the music really set the tone, energy and pace of the film, and the duo's passion for raising awareness for mental illness made their involvement made more special. He added "those guys themselves are just so passionate about using their platforms to have these conversations and to encourage people to educate themselves and just encourage a different direction for the conversation, I think [...] But, of course, you know, they are hugely talented when it comes to music. So that also really helps."

Hollander was involved in the film, after his agent Stephanie Langs asked on whether he would be interested in co-composing the film score with the duo, which he did not do before. After he received an edit from the film, he and Taggart met in New York City, whose ideas and approaches inclined with him, and felt that the film intrigued him due to its realistic depiction of mental illness and connected with him very well. He opined it as a collaborative experience and often isolating as the band would be in Los Angeles and he would live in New York, so they can send their ideas back-and-forth, building the themes and the sonic world of the film independently. Afterwards, Hollander worked with the duo in a studio and recorded and fine-tuned all the musical pieces within a week during the COVID-19 pandemic.

Besides their original score, the film uses the duo's older songs—"Somebody" from their second studio album Sick Boy (2018) and "Push My Luck" from their third studio album World War Joy (2019), and also teased in the film's trailer; "If Walls Could Talk" written and recorded specifically for the film. The soundtrack was released through Disruptor Records and Columbia Records day-and-date with the film on August 21, 2020.

== Reception ==
Guy Lodge of Variety wrote "The Chainsmokers' ever-present, on-trend score contribute to a heightened reality in which everyone is the most vivid, articulate version of themselves possible". Richard Roeper of Chicago Sun-Times called it as an "upbeat original techno-pop music". G. Allen Johnson of Datebook (San Francisco Chronicle) called it as "[a] catchy score, from the Chainsmokers and Andrew Hollander". Pete Hammond of Deadline Hollywood wrote "The music from The Chainsmokers [and Andrew Hollander] is also worth a special mention." Robert Kojder of Flickering Myth wrote "The soundtrack is also done by The Chainsmokers, which is fine low-fi tunes that fit the mood." John DeFore of The Hollywood Reporter called the composers' work as "subtle".

== Track listing ==
Words on Bathroom Walls (Original Motion Picture Soundtrack) track listing
No.	Title	Writer(s)	Producer(s)	Length
1.	"Opening Titles"	Andrew Hollander; Andrew Taggart; Alex Pall	Andrew Hollander; the Chainsmokers	3:37
2.	"My First Psychotic Break"	Hollander; Taggart; Pall	Hollander; the Chainsmokers	1:29
3.	"Quest for a Cure"	Hollander; Taggart; Pall	Hollander; the Chainsmokers	3:19
4.	"Fire on the Nun"	Hollander; Taggart; Pall	Hollander; the Chainsmokers	1:50
5.	"First Day"	Hollander; Taggart; Pall	Hollander; the Chainsmokers	0:57
6.	"Meeting Maya"	Hollander; Taggart; Pall	Hollander; the Chainsmokers	0:49
7.	"Competition"	Hollander; Taggart; Pall	Hollander; the Chainsmokers	1:32
8.	"Searching for Maya"	Hollander; Taggart; Pall	Hollander; the Chainsmokers	1:13
9.	"I Can't Lose It All"	Hollander; Taggart; Pall	Hollander; the Chainsmokers	2:19
10.	"No More Pills"	Hollander; Taggart; Pall	Hollander; the Chainsmokers	1:26
11.	"First Kiss"	Hollander; Taggart; Pall	Hollander; the Chainsmokers	1:25
12.	"Nothing Was Designed to Work"	Hollander; Taggart; Pall	Hollander; the Chainsmokers	3:28
13.	"Push My Luck" (the Chainsmokers)	Taggart; Richard Markowitz; Remy Gautreau	The Chainsmokers; Ian Kirkpatrick; SmarterChild	3:01
14.	"Somebody" (the Chainsmokers featuring Drew Love)	Taggart; Andrew Neely; Emily Warren	The Chainsmokers	3:41
15.	"Prom Hallucinations"	Hollander; Taggart; Pall	Hollander; the Chainsmokers	1:06
16.	"If Walls Could Talk" (the Chainsmokers)	Taggart; Tony Ann; Warren	The Chainsmokers	1:38
17.	"Letter"	Hollander; Taggart; Pall	Hollander; the Chainsmokers	2:36
18.	"Adam's Speech, Pt. 2"	Hollander; Taggart; Pall	Hollander; the Chainsmokers	2:29
19.	"The Kiss"	Hollander; Taggart; Pall	Hollander; the Chainsmokers	4:12
Total length:				42:07
