= Not Another Christmas Song =

Single by Blink-182
- Released: December 6, 2019
- Recorded: 2019
- Genre: Pop punk; Christmas
- Length: 2:39
- Label: Columbia
- Songwriters: Mark Hoppus; Travis Barker; Matt Skiba; Matt Malpass; Aaron Puckett; JP Clark; Mike Skwark
- Producer: Travis Barker

Blink-182 singles chronology
"I Really Wish I Hated You" (2019)	"Not Another Christmas Song" (2019)	"Quarantine" (2020)

"Not Another Christmas Song" is a song recorded by American rock band Blink-182. The song was released on December 6, 2019 through Columbia Records. The song is a downbeat objection to the Christmas and holiday season, lyrically examining the passage of time and a disintegrating relationship. It was written by bassist Mark Hoppus, guitarist Matt Skiba, drummer Travis Barker, who also produced the song. Additional songwriting was handled by Matt Malpass, Aaron Puckett, JP Clark, and Mike Skwark. The song was the final release by the band to feature Skiba, who was unable to perform on the following single "Quarantine" and later departed from the band following the return of founding guitarist Tom DeLonge in 2022.

Critics were largely positive regarding the song, which did not chart commercially but peaked within Billboard's national rock and holiday digital charts. Its music video was produced in claymation, and pictures the band performing for elves at the North Pole.

== Background ==
The song was developed at Barker's studio space, Opra Studios, located in North Hollywood, California. Matt Malpass engineered the sessions. The track was composed by the band themselves, with additional songwriting from Malpass, Aaron Puckett (Lil Aaron), JP Clark, and Mike Skwark. Zakk Cervini, who had previously mixed the bulk of Blink's 2016 comeback record California, served as mix engineer.

The song is not the first by the band to focus on the holiday season, but it is the first with Skiba. The group recorded "I Won't Be Home for Christmas" in 1997 with former drummer Scott Raynor and guitarist Tom DeLonge, which was released as a single in 2001. That same year, with Barker, the band included "Happy Holidays, You Bastard" in the track listing of their fourth LP, Take Off Your Pants and Jacket. Lastly, in 2012, the band issued "Boxing Day"—the celebration taking place after Christmas—as a single to promote their Dogs Eating Dogs extended play.

Lyrically, the narrative takes the typically high-spirited holiday celebrations into a metaphor for the passage of time, as well as a relationship falling apart. In the song, Hoppus laments that "depression's such a lonely business," describing a pairing in which one partner is consistently angry and the other is often apologizing. He then has an idea for his perfect Christmas gift: "Why can't we get divorced for Christmas?" Skiba provides backing vocals, singing "fa la la" in the chorus over a chorus of sleigh bells.

=== Music video ===
The music video for the song was directed by Johnny McHone, with its animation handled by production company dreambear. The video utilizes claymation stylistically, depicting Blink members Hoppus, Barker, and Skiba performing for a group of elves in the North Pole. A series of mishaps begin, resulting in the violent, bloody death of the elves.

== Reception ==
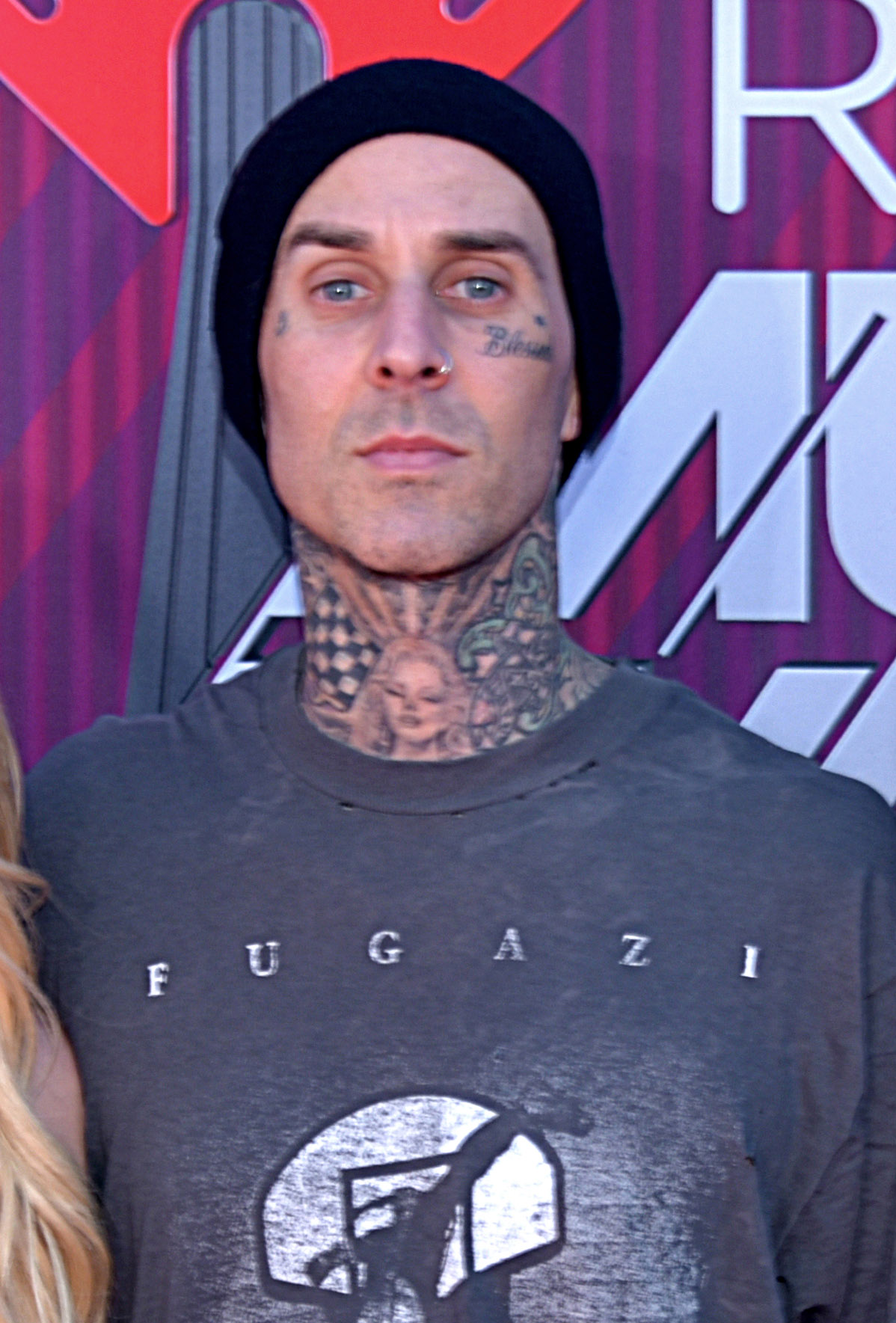
Drummer Travis Barker, pictured here in 2019, produced the song.

Barker first hinted at the song's development in a November interview. The group first teased the song on December 4, 2019, posting its single cover art on their social media accounts, followed by a proper announcement the next day. The single cover is a photograph of the clay versions of themselves from the music video, with the band name written in blood. The song was offered for download and streaming on December 6, with its music video premiering that day as well. On that date, the band also issued joint singles with DJ duo the Chainsmokers—the upbeat "P.S. I Hope You're Happy"—and a collaboration with the posthumous rapper XXXTentacion—"It's All Fading to Black". Commercially, the song failed to chart. "Not Another Christmas Song" did not enter the Alternative Songs chart compiled by Billboard, but it did peak at number 16 on the Rock Digital Song Sales chart. Likewise, it made an appearance at number 37 on the publication's Holiday Digital Song Sales chart in the week preceding Christmas.

Jon Blistein at Rolling Stone complimented the tune as "mostly vintage Blink, with chugging pop-punk riffs during the verse opening up into a full-throated chorus — although there are some expertly placed sleigh bells in the mix as well." Chris DeVille at Stereogum called it a "pretty good Blink-182 song," while Nina Corcoran, writing for online magazine Consequence of Sound, concurred: "It's a pretty good song. Apart from the oversized production, it sounds like it could have been on Take Off Your Pants and Jacket — meaning it's all jittery guitar, quick storytelling, and lyrics that mix remorse mix with youth."

== Track listing ==
- Digital download
1. "Not Another Christmas Song" – 2:39

== Personnel ==
Credits adapted from the official YouTube audio.

Blink-182

- Matt Skiba – vocals, guitars, songwriting
- Mark Hoppus – vocals, bass guitar, songwriting
- Travis Barker – drums, producer

Production

- Matt Malpass – songwriting, recording engineer
- Zakk Cervini – mix engineer
- Aaron Puckett – songwriting
- JP Clark – songwriting
- Mike Skwark – songwriting

== Charts ==
Chart (2019)	Peak position
US Holiday Digital Song Sales (Billboard)	37
US Rock Digital Song Sales (Billboard)	16

== See also ==
- "I Won't Be Home for Christmas"
