= High (The Chainsmokers song) =

2022 single by The Chainsmokers

Single by The Chainsmokers

from the album So Far So Good
- Released: January 28, 2022
- Recorded: March 2021
- Genre: EDM; pop-punk
- Length: 2:54
- Label: Disruptor; Columbia
- Songwriters: Alex Pall; Andrew Taggart; Charlton Howard; Ethan Snoreck; Jacob Kasher Hindlin; Jeff Halavacs; Natalie Salomon; Nick Long
- Producers: The Chainsmokers; Nick Long; Whethan

The Chainsmokers singles chronology
"P.S. I Hope You're Happy" (2019)	"High" (2022)	"iPad" (2022)

Music video
- "High" on YouTube

"High" is a song by American electronic music duo The Chainsmokers, released on January 28, 2022, via Disruptor Records and Columbia Records as the lead single from the duo's fourth studio album So Far So Good (2022). The music video was released on the same day. It also marked the duo's first new music since World War Joy (2019). A demo version of the song written and sung by The Kid LAROI, and featuring The Chainsmokers was leaked in 2021 before the official version's release. This song made an instant impact on pop radio.

== Promotion ==
In early January 2022, the duo posted a teaser clip, showing waves with a purple filter on Instagram with the caption: "Who's ready? #TCS4". On January 13, 2022, they uploaded a video with the caption: "Sorry, The Chainsmokers Are Back", announcing the single would come out.

== Music video ==
An accompanying music video was released on January 28, 2022, and directed by Kid. Studio. It stars Drew Taggart "chasing a love interest [...] on an airplane, the top of a skyscraper, and falling through the air". The video gathered one million views in less than 24 hours.

== Credits and personnel ==
Credits adapted from Tidal.

- Charlton Howard (The Kid LAROI) - lyricist
- Nick Long – producer, composer, lyricist
- The Chainsmokers – producer, composer, lyricist, associated performer
- Ethan Snoreck – producer, composer, lyricist, associated performer, vocal producer
- Jacob Kasher Hindlin – composer, lyricist
- Jeff Halavacs – composer, lyricist
- Natalie Salomon – composer, lyricist
- Adam Alpert – executive producer
- Jeremie Inhaber – assistant mixer, studio personnel
- Emerson Mancini – mastering engineer
- Jordan Stilwell – mixing engineer, recording engineer

== Charts ==
Chart performance for "High"
Chart (2022)	Peak position
Australia (ARIA)	65
Austria (Ö3 Austria Top 40)	68
Belgium (Ultratop 50 Flanders)	41
Canada Hot 100 (Billboard)	36
Canada AC (Billboard)	40
Canada CHR/Top 40 (Billboard)	22
Canada Hot AC (Billboard)	21
Czech Republic Airplay (ČNS IFPI)	6
Global 200 (Billboard)	67
Ireland (IRMA)	87
Japan Hot 100 (Billboard)	77
Netherlands (Dutch Top 40)	29
Netherlands (Single Tip)	1
New Zealand Hot Singles (RMNZ)	4
San Marino (SMRRTV Top 50)	41
South Africa Streaming (TOSAC)	84
Sweden Heatseeker (Sverigetopplistan)	1
Switzerland (Schweizer Hitparade)	96
US Billboard Hot 100	57
US Adult Pop Airplay (Billboard)	15
US Dance Airplay (Billboard)	1
US Pop Airplay (Billboard)	16
US Rhythmic Airplay (Billboard)	39

== Certifications ==
Certifications for "High"
Region	Certification	Certified units/sales
Brazil (Pro-Música Brasil)	Gold	20,000^{‡}
Canada (Music Canada)	Gold	40,000^{‡}
United States (RIAA)	Gold	500,000^{‡}
^{‡} Sales+streaming figures based on certification alone.

== Release history ==
Release history for "High"
Region	Date	Format	Label	Ref.
Various	January 28, 2022	Digital download; streaming	Disruptor; Columbia	
United States	January 31, 2022	Adult contemporary radio	Columbia	
United States	February 1, 2022	Contemporary hit radio	Columbia	
Italy	February 11, 2022	Contemporary hit radio	Sony	

== See also ==
- List of Billboard number-one dance songs of 2022
