= P.S. I Hope You're Happy =

2019 song by the Chainsmokers

Single by the Chainsmokers featuring Blink-182

from the album World War Joy
- Released: December 6, 2019
- Genre: Pop rock; future bass
- Length: 3:45
- Label: Disruptor; Columbia
- Songwriters: Alex Pall; Andrew Taggart; Emily Warren; Mark Hoppus; Travis Barker
- Producers: The Chainsmokers; Travis Barker

The Chainsmokers singles chronology
"See the Way" (2019)	"P.S. I Hope You're Happy" (2019)	"High" (2022)

Blink-182 singles chronology
"Not Another Christmas Song" (2019)	"P.S. I Hope You're Happy" (2019)	"Quarantine" (2020)

"P.S. I Hope You're Happy" is a song by American electronic music duo the Chainsmokers featuring American rock band Blink-182, released on December 6, 2019, as the tenth and final single from the duo's third studio album, World War Joy, which was released on the same day.

== Background ==
In the second verse of "Closer", the 2016 song by the Chainsmokers, featured singer Halsey mentioned a Blink-182 track that was later revealed to be "I Miss You" and also sang "Play that Blink-182 song/That we beat to death in Tucson." On January 16, 2019, the duo tweeted, "Just did a session with blink-182 and wrote an amazing song. We can die happy now". Mark Hoppus from Blink-182 confirmed the post by quoting it, leaving the comment "It's true". Answering questions about this tweet, he wrote "We've been friends with [the Chainsmokers] for a few years and have tried to collaborate a bunch of different times, but today our schedules aligned and we were all in the same room at the same time".

On May 2, the Chainsmokers posted a photo on their social media showing them accompanied by Hoppus and captioning "chains 182". The duo played the track several times during their World War Joy tour. But on November 26, at The Forum near to Los Angeles, they started their set by announcing that they had several surprises to reveal. In addition to setting a release date for their album, they brought for the first time Blink-182 onstage a little less than an hour after it started. Mark Hoppus, equipped with his bass, joined The Chainsmokers while Travis Barker, member of the rock band, already behind his drum kit, ascended from the bowels of the stage. Taggart and Hoppus exchanged verses, while the Chainsmokers' singer sang the chorus. Blink-182 later left a footage of their performance with the title of the song on their social media. Then, on December 1, the Chainsmokers unveiled on their social media the release date and the cover art of the song.

== Charts ==
Chart (2019)	Peak position
US Hot Dance/Electronic Songs (Billboard)	16
US Hot Rock & Alternative Songs (Billboard)	21
