= List of Billboard number-one dance songs of 2022 =

Billboard magazine compiled the top-performing dance songs in the United States during 2022 on the Hot Dance/Electronic Songs and the Dance/Mix Show Airplay. First published as the Hot Dance Radio Airplay in 2003, the Dance/Mix Show Airplay ranked songs based on airplay detections on dance radio, as well as mix-show plays on top 40 radio and select rhythmic radio as measured by Mediabase. Premiered in 2013, the Hot Dance/Electronic Songs is a multi-metric chart ranking songs based on streaming, sales, and airplay audience impressions from radio stations of all formats.

== Chart history ==
Key
†	Indicates top-performing dance song of 2022.

Chart history
Issue date	Hot Dance/Electronic Songs			Dance/Mix Show Airplay		
Issue date	Song	Artist(s)	Ref.	Song	Artist(s)	Ref.
January 1	"Cold Heart"†	Elton John and Dua Lipa		"Cold Heart"	Elton John and Dua Lipa	
January 8	"Cold Heart"†	Elton John and Dua Lipa		"Cold Heart"	Elton John and Dua Lipa	
January 15	"Cold Heart"†	Elton John and Dua Lipa		"Cold Heart"	Elton John and Dua Lipa	
January 22	"Cold Heart"†	Elton John and Dua Lipa		"Cold Heart"	Elton John and Dua Lipa	
January 29	"Cold Heart"†	Elton John and Dua Lipa		"Cold Heart"	Elton John and Dua Lipa	
February 5	"Cold Heart"†	Elton John and Dua Lipa		"Tell It to My Heart"	Meduza featuring Hozier	
February 12	"Cold Heart"†	Elton John and Dua Lipa		"The Motto"	Tiësto and Ava Max	
February 19	"Cold Heart"†	Elton John and Dua Lipa		"The Motto"	Tiësto and Ava Max	
February 26	"Cold Heart"†	Elton John and Dua Lipa		"High"	The Chainsmokers	
March 5	"Cold Heart"†	Elton John and Dua Lipa		"High"	The Chainsmokers	
March 12	"Cold Heart"†	Elton John and Dua Lipa		"High"	The Chainsmokers	
March 19	"Cold Heart"†	Elton John and Dua Lipa		"High"	The Chainsmokers	
March 26	"Cold Heart"†	Elton John and Dua Lipa		"High"	The Chainsmokers	
April 2	"Cold Heart"†	Elton John and Dua Lipa		"High"	The Chainsmokers	
April 9	"Cold Heart"†	Elton John and Dua Lipa		"Don't Forget My Love"	Diplo and Miguel	
April 16	"Cold Heart"†	Elton John and Dua Lipa		"Don't Forget My Love"	Diplo and Miguel	
April 23	"Cold Heart"†	Elton John and Dua Lipa		"Escape"	Kx5 Featuring Hayla	
April 30	"Cold Heart"†	Elton John and Dua Lipa		"Escape"	Kx5 Featuring Hayla	
May 7	"Cold Heart"†	Elton John and Dua Lipa		"Escape"	Kx5 Featuring Hayla	
May 14	"Cold Heart"†	Elton John and Dua Lipa		"Escape"	Kx5 Featuring Hayla	
May 21	"Cold Heart"†	Elton John and Dua Lipa		"Escape"	Kx5 Featuring Hayla	
May 28	"Cold Heart"†	Elton John and Dua Lipa		"Escape"	Kx5 Featuring Hayla	
June 4	"Cold Heart"†	Elton John and Dua Lipa		"Escape"	Kx5 Featuring Hayla	
June 11	"Cold Heart"†	Elton John and Dua Lipa		"Escape"	Kx5 Featuring Hayla	
June 18	"Cold Heart"†	Elton John and Dua Lipa		"As It Was"†	Harry Styles	
June 25	"Cold Heart"†	Elton John and Dua Lipa		"As It Was"†	Harry Styles	
July 2	"Falling Back"	Drake		"About Damn Time"	Lizzo	
July 9	"Break My Soul"	Beyoncé		"About Damn Time"	Lizzo	
July 16	"Break My Soul"	Beyoncé		"About Damn Time"	Lizzo	
July 23	"Break My Soul"	Beyoncé		"About Damn Time"	Lizzo	
July 30	"Break My Soul"	Beyoncé		"About Damn Time"	Lizzo	
August 6	"Break My Soul"	Beyoncé		"Break My Soul"	Beyoncé	
August 13	"Break My Soul"	Beyoncé		"Break My Soul"	Beyoncé	
August 20	"Break My Soul"	Beyoncé		"Break My Soul"	Beyoncé	
August 27	"Break My Soul"	Beyoncé		"Break My Soul"	Beyoncé	
September 3	"Break My Soul"	Beyoncé		"Break My Soul"	Beyoncé	
September 10	"Hold Me Closer"	Elton John and Britney Spears		"Deep Down"	Alok, Ella Eyre and Kenny Dope featuring Never Dull	
September 17	"Break My Soul"	Beyoncé		"Deep Down"	Alok, Ella Eyre and Kenny Dope featuring Never Dull	
September 24	"Break My Soul"	Beyoncé		"Deep Down"	Alok, Ella Eyre and Kenny Dope featuring Never Dull	
October 1	"I'm Good (Blue)"	David Guetta and Bebe Rexha		"Deep Down"	Alok, Ella Eyre and Kenny Dope featuring Never Dull	
October 8	"I'm Good (Blue)"	David Guetta and Bebe Rexha		"Hold Me Closer"	Elton John and Britney Spears	
October 15	"I'm Good (Blue)"	David Guetta and Bebe Rexha		"Hold Me Closer"	Elton John and Britney Spears	
October 22	"I'm Good (Blue)"	David Guetta and Bebe Rexha		"Hold Me Closer"	Elton John and Britney Spears	
October 29	"I'm Good (Blue)"	David Guetta and Bebe Rexha		"I'm Good (Blue)"	David Guetta and Bebe Rexha	
November 5	"I'm Good (Blue)"	David Guetta and Bebe Rexha		"I'm Good (Blue)"	David Guetta and Bebe Rexha	
November 12	"I'm Good (Blue)"	David Guetta and Bebe Rexha		"I'm Good (Blue)"	David Guetta and Bebe Rexha	
November 19	"I'm Good (Blue)"	David Guetta and Bebe Rexha		"I'm Good (Blue)"	David Guetta and Bebe Rexha	
November 26	"I'm Good (Blue)"	David Guetta and Bebe Rexha		"I'm Good (Blue)"	David Guetta and Bebe Rexha	
December 3	"I'm Good (Blue)"	David Guetta and Bebe Rexha		"Unholy"	Sam Smith and Kim Petras	
December 10	"I'm Good (Blue)"	David Guetta and Bebe Rexha		"Unholy"	Sam Smith and Kim Petras	
December 17	"I'm Good (Blue)"	David Guetta and Bebe Rexha		"Unholy"	Sam Smith and Kim Petras	
December 24	"I'm Good (Blue)"	David Guetta and Bebe Rexha		"I'm Good (Blue)"	David Guetta and Bebe Rexha	
December 31	"I'm Good (Blue)"	David Guetta and Bebe Rexha		"I'm Good (Blue)"	David Guetta and Bebe Rexha	

== See also ==
- 2022 in American music
- List of Billboard Hot 100 number ones of 2022
