= Freedo (producer) =

- Born: Fridolin Walcher; 28 November 1989 (age 36)
- Origin: Glarus, Switzerland
- Genres: Hip hop; pop; R&B; dance; trap
- Occupations: Songwriter; record producer; DJ
- Instruments: Keyboards; piano; guitar; Logic Pro
- Years active: 2011–present
- Labels: Virgin EMI; Because
- Website: itsfreedo.com

Fridolin Walcher, known professionally as Freedo, is a Swiss songwriter, record producer, and DJ. He often works with German producer Shuko (Christoph Bauss). Freedo is known for producing Zara Larsson's single "Lush Life", The Chainsmokers's single "Takeaway" and remixing Coldplay's "Up&Up".

== Freedo discography ==
Artist	Song Produced	Credit	Year
Onew	Anywhere	written and prod. with Ryan Bickley & Andrea Rosario	2023
Ava Max	Rumors	writing and additional production	2020
Dimitri Vegas & Like Mike & Kim Loaiza	Do It! feat. Azteck	written and prod. with Michael Thivaios, Lawrie Martin, Kimberly Loaiza Guadalupe Martinez, Ki Fitzgerald, Duck Blackwell & Dimitri Thivaios	2020
Chico Rose & Afrojack	Speechless feat. Azteck		2020
Alok & Vintage Culture	Party On My Own		2020
DJ Katch	No Letting Go feat. Nonô		2020
Inna	Nobody		2020
Inna	Sober		2020
Inna	Not My Baby		2020
NVDES	Purusha		2020
NVDES	Born 222 Love		2020
Handsome Habibi	Don't Waste My Time feat. Yung Baby Tate		2020
The Chainsmokers	Takeaway	(prod w/ The Chainsmokers, Illenium, Erin McCarley)	2019
RIKA	Believe In Ya		2019
Four of Diamonds	Eating Me Up		2019
Blithe	Becoming You		2019
Blithe	Bad		2019
Blithe	Don't Blink		2019
Elderbrook	Old Friend		2018
Rita Ora	Proud	production, written with JinJin & Raye	2018
Four of Diamonds	Blind	prod w/ Jonas Blue & Tre Jean-Marie	2018
Freedo	Keep Your Love On Me	ft. Gabriella Vixen	2017
Dua Lipa	New Rules (Freedo remix)		2017
Martin Solveig	All Stars (Freedo remix)	ft. Alma	2017
Sigala & Ella Eyre	Came Here For Love (Freedo remix)		2017
Demi Lovato	Sorry Not Sorry (Freedo Remix)		2017
Cro	Unendlichkeit	(prod w/ Cro, Shuko)	2017
Lao Ra	Body Bounce		2017
Galantis	Rich Boy	(prod w/Galantis)	2017
Bright Lights	Billion Dollar Love		2017
Little Mix	Down & Dirty Private Show		2016
Little Mix	Nothing Else Matters	(prod w/ Cutfather)	2016
Coldplay	Up&Up (Freedo Remix)		2016
Lao Ra	Drum Machine		2016
Empire Soundtrack	Fabulous	(prod w/ JR Rotem, Shuko)	2016
Bright Lights	Runaway	(prod w/ Shuko, 3lau)	2016
Skylar Stecker	Crazy Beautiful	(prod. w/ Shuko)	2015
Zara Larsson	Lush Life	(prod. w/ Shuko, Emmet)	2015
Savage	Like Michael Jackson	(prod. w/ Shuko, Twice as Nice)	2015
DJ Katch	Wild Out (Freedo Remix)		2015
DJ Katch	Saturday	(prod. w/ Shuko & DJ Katch)	2015
Beyonce	7 11 (DJ Mustard Remix)	(prod. by Freedo & Mustard & Ricky Mears & Shuko)	2015
Cayene	Chaque matin	(prod. w/ Shuko)	2015
Ty Dolla Sign	Stand For (DJ Mustard Remix)	(prod. by Freedo & Mustard & Ricky Mears & Shuko)	2015
Traumfrauen	(German Movie, Soundtrack)		2015
G Dragon & Taeyang	Good Boy	(prod. w/ The Fliptones & Shuko)	2014
Adict	Bye Bye	(prod W/ Shuko & Traxx)	2014
Fedez	M.I.A Sirene Moet Sciandon Veleno per topic Magnifico Generazione Boh	(prod. w/ Shuko, Twice as Nice)	2014
Die Fantastischen Vier	Heute	(prod. w/ Shuko)	2014
Guy Sebastian feat. 2 Chainz	Mama ain’t proud	(prod. w/ Shuko, Twice as Nice)	2014
Guy Sebastian	Animal in me	(prod. w/ Shuko, Twice as Nice)	2014
CRO	Vielleicht	(prod. w/ Shuko, CRO)	2014
CRO	Traum Meine Gang	(prod. w/ Shuko)	2014
Farid Bang	Bitte Spitte Toi Lab	(prod. w/ Shuko)	2014
The Swiss Avengers	Presentation	(prod. w/ Shuko)	2014
Sam	Unendlichkeit	(prod. w/ Shuko)	2014
Sokol i Marysia Starosta	Czarna Biala Magia Reszta Zycia	(prod. w/ Shuko)	2013
Cayene	C'est quoi cette meuf Oui Oui	(prod. w/ Shuko)	2013
DJ KATCH	The Horns Up All Night feat. Shane Eli Let me In feat. Izza Kizza	(prod. w/ DJ Katch, Shuko)	2013
Ira May	Let You Go (Bionx Remix)	(prod. w/ Shuko)	2013
Certifie Parisien	Certifie Parisien	(prod. w/ Shuko)	2013
Fard	Laufe & laufe	(prod. w/ Shuko)	2013
Kollegah & Farid Bang	Drive By Friss oder Stirb	(prod. w/ Shuko)	2013
Diens (Wurzel 5)	Mir Platzt Dr Schädu	(prod. w/ Shuko)	2013
Guizmo & Mokless & Despo Rutti	On est au calme Tagada Pink	(prod. w/ Shuko)	2013
Banu Öztürk & Shyn Falcone	Gitme	(prod. w/ Shuko)	2012
Soprano & REDK	Avant de s'en aller	(prod. w/ Shuko)	2012
Vincenzo (Psy4 de la Rime)	La Matrice feat. Alonzo	(prod. w/ Shuko)	2012
Sexion d'Assaut	Laissez moi ivre	(prod. w/ Shuko)	2012
Farid Bang	German Dream	(prod. w/ Shuko)	2012
Bandit	Nöd Ällei Remix Mini Story		2011
Radical	Blaui Chuglä (Album)		2011
Trolek	Für Mich EP		2011
45 Degré	Generation P		2011
Jack & Luu	Würfelspiel EP		2011
Bandit	Mir Sind Dr Letscht Wos Git		2008
