= Family (song) =

Single by The Chainsmokers and Kygo

from the album World War Joy
- Released: December 6, 2019
- Genre: Dance-pop; tropical house; Country; YEEDM
- Length: 3:21
- Label: Disruptor; Columbia
- Songwriters: Andrew Taggart; Alex Pall; Kyrre Gørvell-Dahll; Andrew Jackson; Chris McClenney; Gradon Jay Lee; Jorgen Odegard
- Producers: The Chainsmokers; Kygo

The Chainsmokers singles chronology
"The Reaper" (2019)	"Family" (2019)	"See the Way" (2019)

Kygo singles chronology
"Higher Love" (2019)	"Family" (2019)	"Forever Yours (Tribute)" (2020)

Music video
- "Family" on YouTube

"Family" is a song by American electronic duo The Chainsmokers and Norwegian DJ and producer Kygo. It was released on December 6, 2019, as the eighth single from the duo's third studio album, World War Joy.

== Background ==
On November 26, 2019, during their World War Joy tour, the duo announced that their album was set to be released on December 6. Then, its entire track listing was made available on their store, unveiling this collaboration with the Norwegian DJ. The collaboration between the artists was never teased before this date. Three days later, DJ Mag announced that it would be released as a single. On December 3, The Chainsmokers posted the cover of the song on their social media.

== Music video ==
The music video of "Family" is primarily a montage of amateur videos focusing on The Chainsmokers' videographer Rory Kramer, detailing his career, a car accident he got in, and how his family helped him recover.

== Charts ==
=== Weekly charts ===
Chart (2019–2020)	Peak position
Belgium (Ultratip Bubbling Under Flanders)	2
Czech Republic Airplay (ČNS IFPI)	68
Ireland (IRMA)	64
New Zealand Hot Singles (RMNZ)	7
Netherlands (Dutch Top 40)	25
Netherlands (Single Top 100)	60
Norway (VG-lista)	31
Slovakia Singles Digital (ČNS IFPI)	91
Sweden (Sverigetopplistan)	60
Switzerland (Schweizer Hitparade)	51
US Dance Airplay (Billboard)	19
US Dance Club Songs (Billboard)	45
US Hot Dance/Electronic Songs (Billboard)	6

=== Year-end charts ===
Chart (2020)	Position
US Hot Dance/Electronic Songs (Billboard)	26
