= So Far So Good (The Chainsmokers album) =

Studio album by The Chainsmokers
- Released: May 13, 2022
- Recorded: 2020–2021
- Genre: EDM-pop
- Length: 44:54
- Labels: Disruptor; Columbia
- Producers: The Chainsmokers; Ian Kirkpatrick; Whethan; Dark Waves

The Chainsmokers chronology
Words on Bathroom Walls (2020)	So Far So Good (2022)	Summertime Friends (2023)

Singles from So Far So Good
- 1. "High" Released: January 28, 2022; 2. "iPad" Released: March 11, 2022; 3. "Riptide" Released: April 22, 2022; 4. "I Love U" Released: May 13, 2022; 5. "The Fall" Released: June 10, 2022; 6. "Why Can't You Wait" Released: July 1, 2022; 7. "Time Bomb" Released: July 22, 2022

So Far So Good is the fourth studio album by American DJ and production duo the Chainsmokers. It was released on May 13, 2022, via Disruptor and Columbia Records and is their first album in 3 years since World War Joy (2019) following their hiatus in 2020. Unlike the duo's previous projects, this album does not feature any artists, but includes production credits from Ian Kirkpatrick and Ethan Snoreck, and writing credits from Chris Martin, Emily Warren, Faheem Najm and Akon. The album debuted at No. 1 on the US Billboard Top Dance/Electronic albums chart.

This album was preceded by singles, "High", "iPad", and "Riptide". The former peaked at number 57 on the Billboard Hot 100, while the latter two debuted at number six and number nine on the Billboard Hot Dance/Electronic Songs chart respectively. "High" and "I Love U" were pushed to US Pop radio.

On October 21, 2022, a remixed version of the album, titled So Far So Good (Lofi Remixes), was released with lo-fi renditions of all of the standard edition tracks.

== Background ==
The creation process for So Far So Good began after the Chainsmokers' 2019 tour, with the duo recording vlogs of them making the album and the process. The project was made under vastly different circumstances than much of their past work. Whereas the duo often built albums while on the road, releasing one track at a time between tour stops, at the end of 2019 they announced they were going on an extended hiatus to give themselves time to focus on just recording music. The production process for So Far So Good began on the North Shore of Oahu, Hawaii a few weeks after the World War Joy tour ended. Taggart and Pall rented a house with the electronic producer Whethan, Ian Kirkpatrick and Emily Warren to work on the album. Work continued during writing retreats in Joshua Tree, California, New York and London, with the duo assembling, then discarding, lyrics and production elements hundreds of times. "To me, these songs sound like they took two years to make," said their manager Alpert. They also did an interview with Zane Lowe on Apple Music, where they talked about mental health struggles and how the album came together.

On May 17, 2022, the Chainsmokers distributed 5,000 NFTs that give rights to streaming royalties from So Far So Good.

On June 8, 2022, The Chainsmokers via Twitter announced a new song, "The Fall", a collaboration with Ship Wrek. The song was added to the album on June 10, as So Far So Good (+ The Fall). On July 1, 2022, the duo released "Why Can't You Wait", a collaboration with Bob Moses. The song, along with "The Fall", was added to a reissue of the album subtitled (+ Why Can't You Wait). On July 22, 2022, the duo released "Time Bomb". The song, along with both "The Fall" and "Why Can't You Wait", was added to a reissue of the album subtitled (+ Time Bomb).

== Critical reception ==
Professional ratings
Review scores
Source	Rating
AllMusic	3.5/5 stars
Pitchfork	6.1/10

Neil Z. Yeung from AllMusic stated that "While the overall energy is familiar, fun, and groove-forward enough to provide proper escapism, the vulnerable lyrics and sad boy gloom could inspire unexpected tears on the dancefloor. The Chainsmokers seem to be demonstrating more and more maturity and emotional depth with each successive album, especially on this aptly titled set." Daniel Bromfield of Pitchfork wrote that the Chainsmokers retained the "essential elements of their EDM-pop style and cut out everything else, including guest features", resulting in "easily their most enjoyable front-to-back listen".

== Commercial performance ==
So Far So Good debuted at No. 1 on the US Billboard Top Dance/Electronic Albums chart and at No. 106 on the Billboard 200 with 10,000 album-equivalent units (including 9,000 pure album sales) on the chart dated May 28, 2022.

== Track listing ==
So Far So Good track listing
No.	Title	Writer(s)	Producer(s)	Length
1.	"Riptide"	Andrew Taggart; Alex Pall; Ethan Snorek; Emily Warren; Ian Kirkpatrick; Chris Martin	The Chainsmokers; Whethan; Kirkpatrick	2:51
2.	"High"	Taggart; Pall; Snorek; Nicholas Long; Natalie Solomon; Jacob Kasher Hindlin; Jeff Halavacs	The Chainsmokers; Whethan; Dark Waves	2:55
3.	"iPad"	Taggart; Pall	The Chainsmokers; Kirkpatrick	3:22
4.	"Maradona"	Taggart; Pall; Snorek; Warren; Kirkpatrick; Isaac Freeman III	The Chainsmokers; Whethan; Kirkpatrick	3:43
5.	"Solo Mission"	Taggart; Pall; Warren; Kirkpatrick	The Chainsmokers; Kirkpatrick; Edwin Carranza^{[c]}; Darek Cobbs^{[c]}	4:25
6.	"Something Different"	Taggart; Pall; Snorek; Warren; Gregory Hein; Kirkpatrick	The Chainsmokers; Whethan; Kirkpatrick	2:34
7.	"I Love U"	Taggart; Pall; Faheem Najm; Aliaune Thiam	The Chainsmokers; Kirkpatrick	3:05
8.	"If You're Serious"	Taggart; Pall	The Chainsmokers; Kirkpatrick	3:44
9.	"Channel 1"	Taggart; Pall; Snorek; Warren; Kirkpatrick	The Chainsmokers; Whethan; Kirkpatrick	3:19
10.	"Testing"	Taggart; Pall; Snorek; Frankie Beverly; Paul Beauregard; Anthony Newley; Leslie Bricusse	The Chainsmokers; Whethan	3:39
11.	"In Too Deep"	Taggart; Pall; Adam Melchor; Chloe George; Madison Yanofsky; Alex Schwartz; Joseph Khajadourian	The Chainsmokers	3:14
12.	"I Hope You Change Your Mind"	Taggart; Pall; Warren; Kirkpatrick	The Chainsmokers; Kirkpatrick	3:24
13.	"Cyanide"	Taggart; Pall; Warren; Kirkpatrick	The Chainsmokers; Kirkpatrick	4:33
Total length:				44:54

Deluxe edition additional tracks
No.	Title	Writer(s)	Producer(s)	Length
14.	"Time Bomb"	Taggart; Pall; George; 94Skrt; Jae Green	The Chainsmokers; 94Skrt; Jae Green	3:23
15.	"The Fall" (with Ship Wrek)	Taggart; Pall; Tillis James Churchill III; Collin Maguire; Warren	The Chainsmokers; Ship Wrek; Ian Kirkpatrick	3:16
16.	"Why Can't You Wait" (with Bob Moses)	Taggart; Pall; Jimmy Vallance; Tom Howie	The Chainsmokers; Bob Moses	3:49
Total length:				55:23

Japan edition bonus tracks
No.	Title	Length
14.	"High" (Almost Weekend Remix)	2:27
15.	"High" (Courts Remix)	3:19
16.	"High" (Deerock Remix)	3:39
17.	"High" (Façade Remix)	2:55
Total length:		57:16

Notes

- "Riptide" and "The Fall" feature background vocals by Emily Warren.
- "In Too Deep" and "Time Bomb" feature uncredited vocals by Chloe George.
- "I Love U" interpolates "Bartender" by T-Pain featuring Akon, with the introduction sampling the voice line of Granblue Fantasy character Clarisse voiced by Ayane Sakura. The line goes, いけいけ 団長！ 頑張れ 頑張れ 団長！, which is translated as "Go, go, Captain! Good luck, good luck, Captain!"
- "Testing" interpolates "Pure Imagination", written by Anthony Newley and Leslie Bricusse for the 1971 film Willy Wonka & the Chocolate Factory.

== Personnel ==
The Chainsmokers

- Andrew Taggart – performance
- Alex Pall – performance

Additional contributors

- Jordan Stilwell – mixing, engineering
- Emerson Mancini (Note: Mancini, who publicly came out as a trans man in January 2023, is credited by his deadname.) – mastering
- Christopher Berdine – creative direction
- J. Collins – art direction, design
- Miller Mobley – photography
- Bethany Vargas – cover photography
- James Whiting – horn arrangement on "iPad"
- The Fat City Horns – horns on "iPad"
- Fatman Scoop – additional vocals on "Maradona"
- Edwin Carranza – string arrangement on "Solo Mission", "Something Different", "I Love U"
- Darek Cobbs – string arrangement on "Solo Mission", "Something Different", "I Love U"

== Charts ==
Chart performance for So Far So Good
Chart (2022)	Peak position
Austrian Albums (Ö3 Austria)	59
Belgian Albums (Ultratop Flanders)	96
Canadian Albums (Billboard)	45
Japanese Albums (Oricon)	22
Japanese Hot Albums (Billboard Japan)	10
UK Album Downloads (Official Charts)	53
US Billboard 200	106
US Top Dance Albums (Billboard)	1
