= Call You Mine =

2019 single by The Chainsmokers featuring Bebe Rexha

Single by The Chainsmokers featuring Bebe Rexha

from the album World War Joy
- Released: May 31, 2019
- Genre: Electropop
- Length: 3:37
- Label: Disruptor; Columbia
- Songwriters: Andrew Taggart; Alex Pall; Tony Ann; Andrew Wotman; Alexandra Tamposi; Steve McCutcheon; Norman Whitfield
- Producers: The Chainsmokers; watt

The Chainsmokers singles chronology
| "Do You Mean" (2019) | "Call You Mine" (2019) | "Takeaway" (2019) |

Bebe Rexha singles chronology
| "Last Hurrah" (2019) | "Call You Mine" (2019) | "Harder" (2019) |

Music video
- "Call You Mine" on YouTube

"Call You Mine" is a song by American production duo The Chainsmokers featuring American singer-songwriter Bebe Rexha. It was released as a single on May 31, 2019, along with its music video, serving as the fourth single from the duo's third studio album World War Joy. "Call You Mine" marks The Chainsmokers' third collaboration with Bebe Rexha, following their remixes of "Take Me Home" by production trio Cash Cash, featuring Rexha on vocals, and their remix of her debut solo single, "I Can't Stop Drinking About You". Its music video won Best Dance Video at the 2019 MTV Video Music Awards. In 2026, Rexha revealed she is unable to listen to the song any more due to an uncorrected audio artefact present in the song.

== Promotion ==
On May 28, 2019, both The Chainsmokers and Bebe Rexha shared a snippet of the music video, tagging each other and captioning it "Friday" and "FRIDAY 5/31", respectively.

== Music video ==
The music video was directed by Dano Cerny. The music video is shown in reverse, and is about Rexha, implied to have stopped being a fan of the Chainsmokers, plotting the murder of them. She gives a sexy dance in a club, which the duo enjoys, then proceeds to poison their drinks before dragging them to her car and driving away from the cops.

== Awards and nominations ==
| Year | Organization | Award | Result | Ref. |
|---|---|---|---|---|
| 2019 | MTV Europe Music Awards | Best Collaboration | Nominated | |
| 2019 | MTV Video Music Award | Best Dance Video | Won | |
| 2019 | MTV Video Music Award | Song of the Summer | Nominated | |
| 2019 | Teen Choice Awards | Choice Electronic/Dance Song | Nominated | |
| 2020 | ASCAP London Music Awards | EDM Song Award | Won | |

== Track listing ==
Digital download
| No. | Title | Length |
|---|---|---|
| 1. | "Call You Mine" | 3:37 |

Digital download – remixes EP
| No. | Title | Length |
|---|---|---|
| 1. | "Call You Mine" (Lookas remix) | 3:46 |
| 2. | "Call You Mine" (Keanu Silva remix) | 2:49 |
| 3. | "Call You Mine" (Asketa & Natan Chaim remix) | 3:03 |
| 4. | "Call You Mine" (Parker remix) | 2:45 |
| 5. | "Call You Mine" (Lick remix) | 2:57 |
| 6. | "Call You Mine" (Sam Berson remix) | 3:00 |

== Charts ==
=== Weekly charts ===
| Chart (2019) | Peak position |
|---|---|
| Australia (ARIA) | 26 |
| Austria (Ö3 Austria Top 40) | 32 |
| Belgium (Ultratip Bubbling Under Flanders) | 4 |
| Belgium (Ultratip Bubbling Under Wallonia) | 10 |
| Canada Hot 100 (Billboard) | 42 |
| China Airplay/FL (Billboard) | 2 |
| Czech Republic Airplay (ČNS IFPI) | 84 |
| Czech Republic Singles Digital (ČNS IFPI) | 19 |
| Germany (GfK) | 55 |
| Hungary (Stream Top 40) | 11 |
| Ireland (IRMA) | 23 |
| Japan Hot 100 (Billboard) | 97 |
| Latvia (LAIPA) | 13 |
| Lithuania (AGATA) | 13 |
| Malaysia (RIM) | 10 |
| Netherlands (Dutch Top 40) | 23 |
| Netherlands (Single Top 100) | 61 |
| New Zealand (Recorded Music NZ) | 32 |
| Norway (VG-lista) | 22 |
| Romania (Airplay 100) | 83 |
| Singapore (RIAS) | 6 |
| Slovakia Airplay (ČNS IFPI) | 32 |
| Slovakia Singles Digital (ČNS IFPI) | 17 |
| Sweden (Sverigetopplistan) | 37 |
| Switzerland (Schweizer Hitparade) | 42 |
| UK Singles (Official Charts) | 50 |
| US Billboard Hot 100 | 56 |
| US Dance Airplay (Billboard) | 15 |
| US Hot Dance/Electronic Songs (Billboard) | 2 |
| US Pop Airplay (Billboard) | 20 |
| US Rolling Stone Top 100 | 38 |

=== Year-end charts ===
| Chart (2019) | Position |
|---|---|
| US Hot Dance/Electronic Songs (Billboard) | 8 |
| Chart (2020) | Position |
| US Hot Dance/Electronic Songs (Billboard) | 80 |

=== Decade-end charts ===
| Chart (2010–2019) | Position |
|---|---|
| US Hot Dance/Electronic Songs (Billboard) | 46 |

== Certifications ==
| Region | Certification | Certified units/sales |
|---|---|---|
| Australia (ARIA) | Platinum | 70,000^{‡} |
| Brazil (Pro-Música Brasil) | 3× Platinum | 120,000^{‡} |
| Canada (Music Canada) | Platinum | 80,000^{‡} |
| Denmark (IFPI Danmark) | Gold | 45,000^{‡} |
| Mexico (AMPROFON) | Gold | 30,000^{‡} |
| New Zealand (RMNZ) | Platinum | 30,000^{‡} |
| Norway (IFPI Norway) | Platinum | 60,000^{‡} |
| Poland (ZPAV) | Gold | 10,000^{‡} |
| United Kingdom (BPI) | Silver | 200,000^{‡} |
| United States (RIAA) | 2× Platinum | 2,000,000^{‡} |
^{‡} Sales+streaming figures based on certification alone.

== Release history ==
| Region | Date | Format | Label | Ref. |
|---|---|---|---|---|
| Various | May 31, 2019 | Digital download; streaming | Columbia | |
| United States | June 4, 2019 | Top 40 radio | Columbia | |
| United States | June 17, 2019 | Hot adult contemporary | Columbia | |
