= The Reaper (The Chainsmokers song) =

2019 single by The Chainsmokers

Single by The Chainsmokers featuring Amy Shark

from the album World War Joy
- Released: December 6, 2019
- Length: 3:04
- Label: Disruptor; Columbia
- Songwriters: Andrew Taggart; Alexander Pall; Emily Warren
- Producers: The Chainsmokers; Dann Hume

The Chainsmokers singles chronology
"Push My Luck" (2019)	"The Reaper" (2019)	"Family" (2019)

Amy Shark singles chronology
"Mess Her Up" (2019)	"The Reaper" (2019)	"Everybody Rise" (2020)

"The Reaper" is a song by American electronic duo The Chainsmokers featuring Australian singer Amy Shark. It was released on December 6, 2019 in Australia, as the seventh single from the duo's third studio album, World War Joy.

== Background ==
On November 26, 2019, during their World War Joy tour, the duo announced that their album was set to be released on December 6. Then, its entire track listing was made available on their store, unveiling this collaboration. On December 4, The Chainsmokers posted the cover of the song on their social media. On December 5, Amy Shark posted the lyric video on her Facebook saying "The Chainsmokers asked me to feature on 'The Reaper' I really love this song it's super sexy and moody AF". Shark later added "What a huge honor to be asked to feature on this track by my boys."

== Reception ==
Laura English from Music Feeds called the song "a dark, brooding, pop hit, full of classic Chainsmokers production with Shark's vocals [which] really give the track some more depth." Hit Network in Australia called the song "a banger".

== Charts ==
Chart (2019–2020)	Peak position
Australia (ARIA)	47
Australia Dance (ARIA)	8
New Zealand Hot Singles (RMNZ)	13

== Certification ==
Region	Certification	Certified units/sales
Australia (ARIA)	Platinum	70,000^{‡}
^{‡} Sales+streaming figures based on certification alone.

== Release history ==
Region	Date	Format	Label	Ref.
Various	December 6, 2019	Digital download; streaming	Disruptor; Columbia	
Australia	December 6, 2019	Contemporary hit radio	Sony; Columbia	
