= Riptide (The Chainsmokers song) =

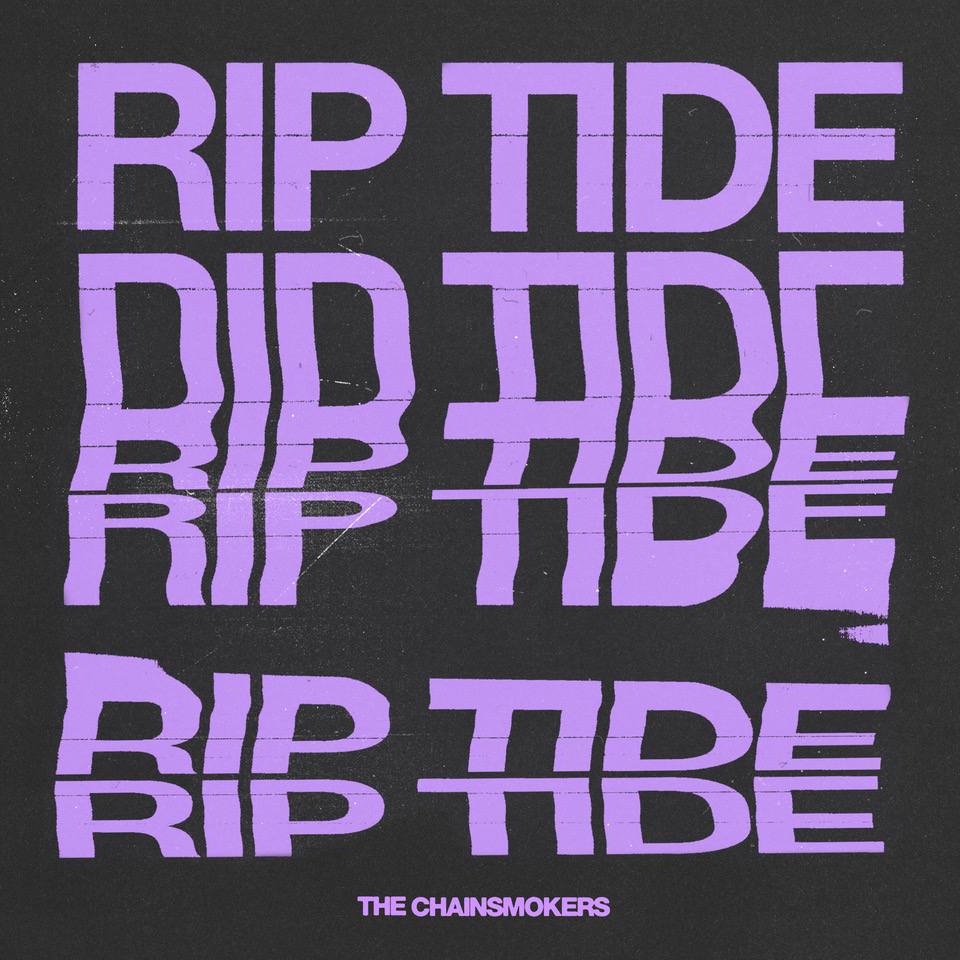

Single by the Chainsmokers

from the album So Far So Good
- Released: April 22, 2022
- Length: 2:51
- Label: Disruptor; Columbia
- Songwriters: Alex Pall; Andrew Taggart; Chris Martin; Emily Warren; Ian Kirkpatrick; Whethan
- Producers: The Chainsmokers; Ian Kirkpatrick

Music video
- "Riptide" on YouTube

"Riptide" is a song by American electronic production duo the Chainsmokers, released via Disruptor Records and Columbia Records on April 22, 2022, as the third single from the duo's fourth studio album So Far So Good (2022). The song was co-written with Coldplay frontman Chris Martin and frequent collaborator Emily Warren. The song contains auto-tuned vocals by Drew Taggart.

== Charts ==
=== Weekly charts ===
Weekly chart performance for "Riptide"
Chart (2022)	Peak position
New Zealand Hot Singles (RMNZ)	26
US Hot Dance/Electronic Songs (Billboard)	9

=== Year-end charts ===
Year-end chart performance for "Riptide"
Chart (2022)	Position
US Hot Dance/Electronic Songs (Billboard)	95
