= IPad (song) =

2022 single by The Chainsmokers

"iPad"

Single by The Chainsmokers

from the album So Far So Good
- Released: March 11, 2022
- Length: 3:22
- Label: Disruptor; Columbia
- Songwriters: Andrew Taggart; Alex Pall
- Producers: The Chainsmokers; Ian Kirkpatrick

The Chainsmokers singles chronology
| "High" (2022) | "iPad" (2022) | "The Fall" (2022) |

Music video
- "iPad" on YouTube

"iPad" is a song by American electronic music duo The Chainsmokers, released on March 11, 2022, via Disruptor Records and Columbia Records as the second single from the duo's fourth studio album So Far So Good (2022). The accompanying music video was released on the same day. Commercially, "iPad" debuted at number six on the Billboard Hot Dance/Electronic Songs chart, becoming the duo's twentieth top ten on the chart.

== Background ==
Speaking on the song in an Instagram post the day prior to the song's release, The Chainsmokers member Drew Taggart said:

We wrote this song when I felt like I didn't have anyone to talk to. It wasn't that I didn't have anyone that would listen, but I had reached a level of cognitive dissonance that I felt was unexplainable. don't keep a journal so writing this song and the others on this album (and past albums) is my opportunity to organize my thoughts. If you listened to Sick Boy you know what I mean ;) We feel really lucky we get to do it in song form and that you are willing to listen. It's helped us a lot, so thank you. The next bit of the story is called iPad and it comes out tonight. Thanks for being here.

== Music video ==
The official music video was released on the same day as the song, and was directed by Kid. Studio. In the video, Drew Taggart explores the local areas of New York City (Alex Pall and Matt McGuire make appearances around the video). The video represents the "conflicting emotions that follow ending an unhealthy relationship".

== Charts ==
=== Weekly charts ===
Weekly chart performance for "iPad"
| Chart (2022) | Peak position |
|---|---|
| New Zealand Hot Singles (RMNZ) | 13 |
| US Dance Airplay (Billboard) | 30 |
| US Hot Dance/Electronic Songs (Billboard) | 6 |

=== Year-end charts ===
Year-end chart performance for "iPad"
| Chart (2022) | Position |
|---|---|
| US Hot Dance/Electronic Songs (Billboard) | 68 |
