= Takeaway (song) =

2019 song by The Chainsmokers and Illenium

Single by The Chainsmokers and Illenium featuring Lennon Stella

from the album World War Joy and Ascend
- Released: July 24, 2019
- Recorded: Spring 2019
- Genre: Future bass
- Length: 3:29
- Label: Disruptor; Columbia
- Composers: Andrew Taggart; Alexander Pall; Nicholas Miller; Fridolin Walcher; Jonas Becker; Timofei Crudu; Christoph "Shuko" Bauss
- Lyricists: Sorana Păcurar; Samuel John Gray
- Producers: The Chainsmokers; Illenium; Freedo (co.); Erin McCarley (voc.); Jordan Stillwell (voc.)

The Chainsmokers singles chronology
"Call You Mine" (2019)	"Takeaway" (2019)	"Push My Luck" (2019)

Illenium singles chronology
"Good Things Fall Apart" (2019)	"Takeaway" (2019)	"Blood" (2019)

Lennon Stella singles chronology
"Bitch (Takes One to Know One)" (2019)	"Takeaway" (2019)	"Kissing Other People" (2019)

Music video
- "Takeaway" on YouTube

"Takeaway" is a song by American production duo The Chainsmokers and American EDM musician Illenium, featuring Canadian singer Lennon Stella. It was released as a single on July 24, 2019, along with its music video, serving as the fifth single from both artists' third studio albums World War Joy and Ascend, respectively. The single became The Chainsmokers' seventh, and both Illenium's and Stella's first, number one on Billboard's Dance/Mix Show Airplay Chart in November 2019.

== Music video ==
The music video, directed by Jeremiah Davis and produced by That One Blond Kid Corp, (Note: Credits adapted from the video's description on YouTube.) was uploaded to YouTube on July 24, 2019.

The video was filmed in New York City at the Vessel, a massive staircase sculpture in the Hudson Yards development. The interactive art installation is the work of Thomas Heatherwick.

== Charts ==
=== Weekly charts ===
Chart (2019)	Peak position
Australia (ARIA)	32
Australia Dance (ARIA)	4
Austria (Ö3 Austria Top 40)	28
Belgium (Ultratop 50 Flanders)	36
Belgium Dance (Ultratop Flanders)	20
Belgium (Ultratip Bubbling Under Wallonia)	15
Belgium Dance (Ultratop Wallonia)	24
Canada Hot 100 (Billboard)	31
China Airplay/FL (Billboard)	15
Czech Republic Airplay (ČNS IFPI)	65
Czech Republic Singles Digital (ČNS IFPI)	17
France (SNEP)	136
Germany (GfK)	30
Germany Dance (Official German Charts)	5
Hungary (Rádiós Top 40)	20
Hungary (Single Top 40)	20
Hungary (Stream Top 40)	10
Ireland (IRMA)	41
Latvia (LaIPA)	19
Lithuania (AGATA)	14
Malaysia (RIM)	15
Netherlands (Single Top 100)	95
New Zealand Hot Singles (RMNZ)	3
Norway (VG-lista)	14
Romania (Airplay 100)	64
Singapore (RIAS)	11
Slovakia Singles Digital (ČNS IFPI)	11
Sweden (Sverigetopplistan)	38
Switzerland (Schweizer Hitparade)	36
UK Singles (Official Charts)	64
UK Dance (Official Charts)	13
US Billboard Hot 100	69
US Dance Airplay (Billboard)	1
US Hot Dance/Electronic Songs (Billboard)	3
US Rolling Stone Top 100	29

=== Monthly charts ===
Monthly chart performance for "Takeaway"
Chart (2019)	Peak position
Latvia Airplay (LaIPA)	7

=== Year-end charts ===
Chart (2019)	Position
Germany (Official German Charts)	100
Latvia (LaIPA)	79
US Hot Dance/Electronic Songs (Billboard)	16

Chart (2020)	Position
US Hot Dance/Electronic Songs (Billboard)	18

== Certifications ==
Region	Certification	Certified units/sales
Australia (ARIA)	Platinum	70,000^{‡}
Belgium (BRMA)	Gold	20,000^{‡}
Brazil (Pro-Música Brasil)	3× Platinum	120,000^{‡}
Canada (Music Canada)	Platinum	80,000^{‡}
Denmark (IFPI Danmark)	Gold	45,000^{‡}
France (SNEP)	Gold	100,000^{‡}
Germany (BVMI)	Gold	200,000^{‡}
Italy (FIMI)	Gold	35,000^{‡}
Mexico (AMPROFON)	Gold	30,000^{‡}
New Zealand (RMNZ)	Platinum	30,000^{‡}
Poland (ZPAV)	Gold	25,000^{‡}
Switzerland (IFPI Switzerland)	Gold	10,000^{‡}
United Kingdom (BPI)	Silver	200,000^{‡}
United States (RIAA)	2× Platinum	2,000,000^{‡}
^{‡} Sales+streaming figures based on certification alone.

== Release history ==
Region	Date	Format	Label	Ref.
Various	July 24, 2019	Digital download; streaming	Columbia	
United States	September 24, 2019	Contemporary hit radio	Columbia	
