= Quarantine (Blink-182 song) =

2020 single by Blink-182

Single by Blink-182
- Released: August 7, 2020
- Recorded: May 2020
- Genre: Punk rock; skate punk; pop punk
- Length: 2:03
- Label: Columbia
- Songwriters: Mark Hoppus; Travis Barker; Brian Lee
- Producers: Travis Barker; Brian Lee

Blink-182 singles chronology
"Not Another Christmas Song" (2019)	"Quarantine" (2020)	"Edging" (2022)

"Quarantine" is a song recorded by American rock band Blink-182. The song was released on August 7, 2020, through Columbia Records, and is the first single by the band to only feature bassist/vocalist Mark Hoppus and drummer Travis Barker. The fast-paced punk number explores boredom during the lockdown caused by the COVID-19 pandemic. It was written by Hoppus, who sings solo vocals and plays guitar on the track in addition to his usual bass duties. Additional songwriting is credited to Barker and songwriter Brian Lee, both of whom also produced the song. Due to the lack of a home studio, then-guitarist/vocalist Matt Skiba did not contribute to the track.

== Background and composition ==
"Quarantine" was written about the COVID-19 lockdowns imposed in March 2020. Hoppus opens the song expressing boredom at life in lockdown, acknowledging his place in life: "I guess I'm blessed to be this fucking bored," he sings. He goes on to suggest he would rather be elsewhere, including commonly-cited tedious tasks such as going to the DMV. The lyrics take a political turn, referencing President Donald Trump's belief that the virus would "disappear in April". The song was recorded in May 2020.

Hoppus wrote the song with drummer Travis Barker and musician Brian Lee, a songwriter best known for his work with pop artists such as Camila Cabello, Post Malone, and Justin Bieber. Although guitarist Skiba is not credited on the song, he does appear in the lyric video. During an Instagram live, Hoppus explained that Skiba refused to go to the studio to record the song and stayed in quarantine, as he suspected to have been in close proximity to someone who was diagnosed with COVID-19 and did not rejoin the band in the studio until after the song had already been completed.

This song has been described as punk rock, skate punk and pop punk by critics.

== Personnel ==
Credits adapted from the official YouTube audio.

Blink-182

- Mark Hoppus – vocals, bass guitar, guitars, songwriting
- Travis Barker – drums, percussion, producer

Production

- Brian Lee – songwriting, production
- Scott Skrzynski – assistant engineer
- Neal Avron – mixing engineer
- Chris Athens – mastering engineer

== See also ==
- Songs and recordings inspired by the COVID-19 pandemic and its effects
