= World War Joy =

Studio album by the Chainsmokers
- Released: December 6, 2019
- Recorded: 2019
- Genre: Electropop; EDM
- Length: 33:47
- Label: Disruptor; Columbia
- Producer: The Chainsmokers; Warren "Oak" Felder; Trackside; London on da Track; William Spencer Bastian; Andrew Watt; Illenium; Freedo; Ian Kirkpatrick; SmarterChild; Travis Barker; Kygo

The Chainsmokers studio album chronology
| Sick Boy (2018) | World War Joy (2019) | So Far So Good (2022) |

Singles from World War Joy
- 1. "Who Do You Love" Released: February 7, 2019; 2. "Kills You Slowly" Released: March 29, 2019; 3. "Do You Mean" Released: April 26, 2019; 4. "Call You Mine" Released: May 31, 2019; 5. "Takeaway" Released: July 24, 2019; 6. "Push My Luck" Released: November 8, 2019; 7. "The Reaper" Released: December 6, 2019; 8. "Family" Released: December 6, 2019; 9. "See the Way" Released: December 6, 2019; 10. "P.S. I Hope You're Happy" Released: December 6, 2019

Professional ratings
Review scores
| Source | Rating |
|---|---|
| AllMusic | 3/5 stars |

World War Joy is the third studio album by American DJ and production duo the Chainsmokers. It was released on December 6, 2019, under Disruptor and Columbia Records. The album features collaborations with Amy Shark, Kygo, Sabrina Claudio, Blink-182, Illenium, Lennon Stella, Bebe Rexha, Ty Dolla Sign, Bülow and 5 Seconds of Summer. World War Joy, which consists of six singles gradually released throughout the year as well as four new singles. The album debuted at No. 1 on the Billboard Top Dance/Electronic Albums Chart.

== Background ==
Similarly to how their previous album, Sick Boy, was released, the Chainsmokers gradually released World War Joy with new tracks appearing monthly, collecting them together as EPs each time.

On February 7, 2019, the Chainsmokers released the album's lead single "Who Do You Love", featuring Australian band 5 Seconds of Summer. In an interview with Billboard on March 27, 2019, they announced plans to release a new album, World War Joy, in 2019. The second single from the album, titled "Kills You Slowly", was released on March 29, 2019. The third single from the album, "Do You Mean", featuring Ty Dolla $ign and Bülow, was released on April 26, 2019. The fourth single from the album, "Call You Mine", featuring Bebe Rexha, was released on May 31, 2019. On July 17, the Chainsmokers revealed the title "Takeaway", the next single, a collaboration with Illenium featuring Lennon Stella, which was released on July 24, 2019, as the fifth single of both World War Joy and Illenium's third album, Ascend. On September 25, while performing in Cincinnati, the duo premiered a new unreleased song from the album called "Push My Luck", which was released later on November 8, 2019. On December 6, 2019, "Family", "P.S. I Hope You're Happy", "See the Way", and "The Reaper" were released as the seventh, eighth, ninth, and tenth singles from the album.

== Tour ==
In support of the album, the duo embarked on the World War Joy Tour in fall 2019 alongside Australian band, 5 Seconds of Summer and Canadian musician Lennon Stella. This tour was different from their previous shows since they are playing a fully live show, and not a hybrid DJ set/live show like the Memories...Do Not Open Tour and some of their festival performances. Matt McGuire returned as drummer as well as serving as music director. The tour took place across various arenas in 41 North American cities.

== Commercial performance ==
The album debuted and peaked at number 65 on the Billboard 200, however it debuted atop Billboard's Top Dance/Electronic Albums chart with 14,000 equivalent album units, including 2,000 from traditional album sales, according to Nielsen Music.

== Track listing ==
World War Joy track listing
| No. | Title | Writer(s) | Producer(s) | Length |
|---|---|---|---|---|
| 1. | "The Reaper" (featuring Amy Shark) | Andrew Taggart; Alexander Pall; Emily Warren | The Chainsmokers; Dann Hume^{[v]} | 3:04 |
| 2. | "Family" (with Kygo) | Taggart; Pall; Kyrre Gørvell-Dahll; Andrew Jackson; Chris McClenney; Gradon Jay Lee; Jorgen Odegard | The Chainsmokers; Kygo | 3:21 |
| 3. | "See the Way" (featuring Sabrina Claudio) | Taggart; Pall; Ferras Alqaisi; Hayley Gene Penner; Lennon Stella; Nate Cyphert; Sabrina Claudio; Stuart Crichton | The Chainsmokers | 2:56 |
| 4. | "P.S. I Hope You're Happy" (featuring Blink-182) | Taggart; Pall; Warren; Mark Hoppus; Travis Barker | The Chainsmokers; Barker; Cassette Tapes^{[a]} | 3:45 |
| 5. | "Push My Luck" | Taggart; Richard Markowitz; Remy Gautreau | The Chainsmokers; Ian Kirkpatrick; SmarterChild | 3:01 |
| 6. | "Takeaway" (with Illenium featuring Lennon Stella) | Taggart; Pall; Nicholas Miller; Fridolin "Freedo" Walcher; Sorana Păcurar; Samuel John Gray; Jonas Becker; Timofei Crudu; Christoph "Shuko" Bauss | The Chainsmokers; Illenium; Freedo^{[c]}; Erin McCarley^{[v]}; Jordan Stilwell^{[v]} | 3:29 |
| 7. | "Call You Mine" (featuring Bebe Rexha) | Taggart; Pall; Tony Ann; Andrew Wotman; Alexandra Tamposi; Steve McCutcheon; Norman Whitfield | The Chainsmokers; Watt | 3:37 |
| 8. | "Do You Mean" (featuring Ty Dolla Sign and Bülow) | Taggart; Pall; William Spencer Bastian; Tyrone Griffin Jr.; Megan Bülow; Shae Jacobs; Michael Wise; Kennedi Lykken | The Chainsmokers; William Spencer Bastian^{[v]} | 3:13 |
| 9. | "Kills You Slowly" | Taggart; Pall; Parrish Warrington; Diedrik van Elsas; Gino The Ghost; Kristyn Watkins; Liam O'Donnell; Maxwell George "MAX" Schneider; Nathaniel Motte | The Chainsmokers; Trackside; London on da Track^{[a]} | 3:35 |
| 10. | "Who Do You Love" (featuring 5 Seconds of Summer) | Taggart; Pall; Warren "Oak" Felder; Luke Hemmings; Calum Hood; Ashton Irwin; Michael Clifford; Talay Riley; Sean Douglas; Trevor Brown; William Zaire Simmons | The Chainsmokers; Oak Felder | 3:46 |
| Total length: | | | | 33:47 |

Japan edition bonus tracks
| No. | Title | Length |
|---|---|---|
| 11. | "Closer" (featuring Mackenyu Arata) | 4:06 |
| 12. | "Takeaway" (with Illenium featuring Lennon Stella; Sondr Remix) | 3:34 |
| 13. | "Push My Luck" (Twinsick Remix) | 3:22 |
| 14. | "Call You Mine" (featuring Bebe Rexha; Keanu Silver Remix) | 2:49 |
| 15. | "Who Do You Love" (featuring 5 Seconds of Summer; R3hab Remix) | 2:32 |
| Total length: | | 53:29 |

World War Joy EP
| No. | Title | Writer(s) | Producer(s) | Length |
|---|---|---|---|---|
| 1. | "Call You Mine" (featuring Bebe Rexha) | Andrew Taggart; Alex Pall; Tony Ann; Andrew Wotman; Alexandra Tamposi; Steve McCutcheon; Norman Whitfield | The Chainsmokers; Watt | 3:37 |
| 2. | "Do You Mean" (featuring Ty Dolla Sign and Bülow) | Taggart; Pall; William Spencer Bastian; Tyrone Griffin; Megan Bülow; Shae Jacobs; Michael Wise; Kennedi Lykken | The Chainsmokers; William Spencer Bastian (voc.) | 3:13 |
| 3. | "Kills You Slowly" | Taggart; Pall; Parrish Warrington; Diedrik van Elsas; Gino Borri; Kristyn Watkins; Liam O'Donnell; Maxwell George "MAX" Schneider; Nathaniel Motte | The Chainsmokers; Trackside; London On Da Track (add.) | 3:35 |
| 4. | "Who Do You Love" (featuring 5 Seconds of Summer) | Taggart; Pall; Warren "Oak" Felder; Luke Hemmings; Calum Hood; Ashton Irwin; Michael Clifford; Talay Riley; Sean Douglas; Trevor Brown; William Zaire Simmons | The Chainsmokers; Oak | 3:46 |
| Total length: | | | | 14:11 |

Notes

- ^{^[c]} signifies a co-producer
- ^{^[a]} signifies an additional producer
- ^{^[v]} signifies a vocal producer

== Personnel ==
Adapted from Tidal.

- Adam Alpert – executive production
- Alex Pall – production (all), songwriting (all)
- Andrew Jackson – songwriting, background vocals (2)
- Andrew Taggart – production (all), songwriting (all), vocals (1, 2, 3, 4, 5, 6, 8, 9), backing vocals (7, 10)
- Talay Riley – songwriting (track 10), background vocals (track 10)
- Luke Hemmings – vocals (track 10), songwriting (track 10)
- Ashton Irwin – vocals (track 10), songwriting (track 10)
- Calum Hood – vocals (track 10), songwriting (track 10)
- Michael Clifford – vocals (track 10), songwriting (track 10)
- Andrew Watt – production (track 7)
- Bebe Rexha — vocals (track 7)

== Charts ==
=== Weekly charts ===
| Chart (2019–2020) | Peak position |
|---|---|
| Australian Albums (ARIA) | 19 |
| Canadian Albums (Billboard) | 30 |
| Czech Albums (ČNS IFPI) | 67 |
| Dutch Albums (Album Top 100) | 24 |
| Finnish Albums (Suomen virallinen lista) | 29 |
| Irish Albums (IRMA) | 85 |
| Japan Hot Albums (Billboard Japan) | 18 |
| Japanese Albums (Oricon) | 21 |
| Latvian Albums (LAIPA) | 22 |
| New Zealand Albums (RMNZ) | 25 |
| Slovak Albums (IFPI) | 59 |
| Swedish Albums (Sverigetopplistan) | 16 |
| US Billboard 200 | 65 |
| US Top Dance Albums (Billboard) | 1 |

=== Year-end charts ===
| Chart (2020) | Position |
|---|---|
| Australian Albums (ARIA) | 71 |
| Dutch Albums (Album Top 100) | 79 |
| Swedish Albums (Sverigetopplistan) | 68 |
| US Top Dance/Electronic Albums (Billboard) | 4 |

== Certifications ==
| Region | Certification | Certified units/sales |
|---|---|---|
| Australia (ARIA) | Gold | 35,000^{‡} |
| Brazil (Pro-Música Brasil) | Platinum | 40,000^{‡} |
| Canada (Music Canada) | Platinum | 80,000^{‡} |
| Denmark (IFPI Danmark) | Gold | 10,000^{‡} |
| Singapore (RIAS) | Platinum | 10,000^{*} |
| United States (RIAA) | Gold | 500,000^{‡} |
^{*} Sales figures based on certification alone.^{‡} Sales+streaming figures based on certification alone.
