= Push My Luck =

2019 song by The Chainsmokers

Single by The Chainsmokers

from the album World War Joy
- Released: November 8, 2019
- Genre: Pop; future bass
- Length: 3:01
- Label: Disruptor; Columbia
- Songwriter(s): Andrew Taggart; Richard Samuel Markowitz; Remy Gautreau
- Producer(s): The Chainsmokers; Ian Kirkpatrick; SmarterChild

The Chainsmokers singles chronology
"Takeaway" (2019)	"Push My Luck" (2019)	"The Reaper" (2019)

Music video
- "Push My Luck" on YouTube

"Push My Luck" is a song by American duo The Chainsmokers. It was released on November 8, 2019, as the sixth single from their album World War Joy.

== Background ==
The track was first heard in mid-June 2019 in an Instagram story of The Chainsmokers. On September 25, they played it for the first time live on their World War Joy tour in Cincinnati, Ohio. On the following day, they mentioned the song to Billboard, unveiling its title. Andrew Taggart, a member of the duo said, "This one is not out yet", unveiling that it will be named "Push My Luck". They later said to the same publication, in October, that the song "wasn't able to be released in time for the tour". Andrew Taggart revealed he was nervous, and he confidently sang lyrics like, "I think I might push my luck with you/'Cause you say that you've got nothing else to do." On November 4, 2019, the duo announced the release of the song on Twitter, posting a short teaser animated by the cover of the song. Their announcement was made at the same time they announced that they will play at 3Arena in 2020.

== Critical reception ==
During the duo's tour, the magazine Billboard made a recapitulation of their previous releases. Unveiling the existence of the upcoming track, Gil Kaufman of the publication deemed it "an unreleased ballad into the lineup near the beginning of the set [...] before leaning into the sentimental chorus, "I think I might push my luck with you," over Pall's gentle [i.e. Alex Pall, the other half of the duo], swaying keyboard line". A few hours prior the release, Karlie Powell of Your EDM noted that the song is "about pushing your luck with someone, acting on those butterfly feelings from the jumpsounds". She felt the track "like a synth-filled dream, amplifying the signature style" of the duo.

After the release, the song received criticism from multiple publications. Writing for Dancing Astronaut, Farrell Sweeney remarked that the song "leans on Andrew Taggart's vocals", endowed with "a simple yet catchy synth note progression [which] creates a delicate drop that doesn't detract from the sense of calm the track instills". He added that the single "falls on the pop-leaning side of the production spectrum from [the duo]", containing "light instrumentals [which] carry a majority of the track". Shakiel Mahjouri of Entertainment Tonight Canada called it "a sultry track", which makes "a stark contrast from some of the bangers The Chainsmokers have become famous for". Concerning the composition, he remarked the presence of "a synth note progression" which "creates a light by noticeable drop" and wrote that the song is "buoyed by Andrew Taggart's vocals with light instrumentals provided by Alex Pall and others". Jason Lipshutz of Billboard described too the track as "a stark contrast from their "#Selfie"-led early days". He called the song "a moody wonder", with a slowing down tempo and "a pseudo-breakdown in the back half but more room set aside for an acoustic guitar lick and quiet reflection on the submission of the moment in which infatuation turns into commitment". Katie Bain of the same publication called the production "a plaintive sort of ballad", containing Andrew Taggart's vocals which "get pitched all the way up" and a chorus which "gets an elastic build". She wrote that "Push My Luck" certainly "does push hard into indie pop territory" but "goes full on EDM at 2:08 precisely", remarking this construction as usual from the American duo. Writing for EDM.com, Katie Stone deemed the song "a downtempo pop crossover with a subtle future bass feel to it", which perfectly "follows the emotional vibe of the rest of the album thus far". According to her, it is about "the internal struggle one has when they are pursuing a new relationship". Karlie Powell of Your EDM noted that "the first 2/3 of the track is unapologetically pop by design, with a gorgeous electronic-fused breakdown toward the end", making it "a soft, melodic production worth obsessing over".

== Composition ==
"Push My Luck" is written in the key of D Major and is 90 beats per minute.

== Music video ==
The official music video of the song was premiered on the same day through The Chainsmokers YouTube channel. Directed by Steven Sebring, it features Brazilian model Lais Ribeiro.

== Credits and personnel ==
Credits adapted from Tidal.

- Ian Kirkpatrick – production
- SmarterChild – production, composition, lyrics
- Andrew Taggart – production, composition, lyrics
- Alex Pall – production
- Remy Gautreau – composition, lyrics
- Emerson Mancini – master engineering
- Jordan Stilwell – mix engineering

== Charts ==
Chart (2019)	Peak position
New Zealand Hot Singles (RMNZ)	15
Norway (VG-lista)	40
Slovakia (Rádio Top 100)	91
Sweden Heatseeker (Sverigetopplistan)	11
UK Dance (OCC)	40
