= Memories Do Not Open Tour =

2017 concert tour by the Chainsmokers

- Tour by The Chainsmokers
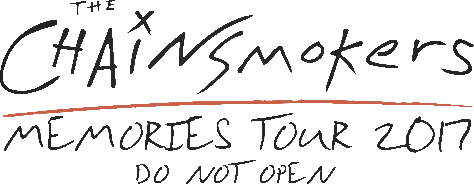
- Associated album: Memories...Do Not Open
- Start date: April 13, 2017
- End date: October 24, 2017
- Legs: 6
- No. of shows: 71

The Chainsmokers concert chronology
- Memories Do Not Open Tour (2017); World War Joy Tour (2019)

The Memories Do Not Open Tour was a concert tour by The Chainsmokers, in support of the duo's debut studio album, Memories...Do Not Open (2017). The tour began in Miami on April 13, 2017, and ended on October 24, 2017, in Auckland.

== Background and development ==
On January 30, 2017, the duo announced they will be releasing their debut album, accompanied by an arena tour. Kiiara was announced as the opening act, with Emily Warren as a special guest during the Chainsmokers' set. They announced on Instagram that they would be taking a fan, Tony Ann, (a Berklee College of Music student) with them on the tour because they were impressed with his piano cover of their song "Paris".

== Critical reception ==
The tour received mixed reviews. One negative review from Miami, Zach Schlein simply said he was "not a fan". In an EDM Sauce review from Albany, Nick White described the production of the show as "something that has clearly been thought out for a long time." He also noted that the non-DJ parts of the show weren't the best saying "Andrew's vocals just don't do it for me", but complimenting the drummer and keyboard player calling them "the highlights of the band section with each of them getting a solo section and absolutely killing it". A Toronto review, Tashana Billey called it a "top-notch show" and "definitely worth checking out".

== Tour dates ==
List of concerts, showing date, city, country, venue, opening acts, tickets sold, number of available tickets and amount of gross revenue
Date	City	Country	Venue	Opening acts	Attendance	Revenue
North America
April 13, 2017	Miami	United States	American Airlines Arena	Kiiara; K?D	14,167 / 14,167	$693,312
April 14, 2017	Tampa	United States	Amalie Arena	Kiiara; K?D	13,267 / 13,538	$606,731
April 15, 2017	North Charleston	United States	North Charleston Coliseum	Kiiara; K?D	8,763 / 8,763	$367,720
April 18, 2017	Charlottesville	United States	John Paul Jones Arena	Kiiara; K?D	11,838 / 11,838	$570,298
April 20, 2017	Bridgeport	United States	Webster Bank Arena	Kiiara; K?D	5,261 / 6,916	$366,856
April 21, 2017	Albany	United States	Times Union Center	Kiiara; K?D	11,605 / 11,605	$542,642
April 22, 2017	Pittsburgh	United States	PPG Paints Arena	Kiiara; K?D	12,860 / 12,860	$624,634
April 25, 2017	Cleveland	United States	Wolstein Center	Kiiara; Shaun Frank	10,431 / 10,616	$229,266
April 26, 2017	Cincinnati	United States	U.S. Bank Arena	Kiiara; Shaun Frank	10,758 / 12,780	$405,545
April 27, 2017	Detroit	United States	Joe Louis Arena	Kiiara; Shaun Frank	12,768 / 13,904	$700,141
April 28, 2017	Madison	United States	Veterans Memorial Coliseum	Kiiara; Shaun Frank	9,738 / 9,738	$657,315
April 29, 2017	Rosemont	United States	Allstate Arena	Kiiara; Shaun Frank	12,723 / 12,723	$902,168
April 30, 2017	Des Moines	United States	Wells Fargo Arena	Kiiara; Grandtheft	8,441 / 8,441	$486,588
May 2, 2017	West Valley City	United States	Maverik Center	Kiiara; Grandtheft	7,363 / 10,164	$418,945
May 4, 2017	Sacramento	United States	Golden 1 Center	Kiiara; Grandtheft	12,170 / 12,170	$599,442
May 5, 2017	San Francisco	United States	Bill Graham Civic Auditorium	Kiiara; Grandtheft	17,000 / 17,000	$1,445,000
May 6, 2017	San Francisco	United States	Bill Graham Civic Auditorium	Kiiara; Kyle	17,000 / 17,000	$1,445,000
May 8, 2017	San Diego	United States	Valley View Casino Center	Kiiara; Kyle	11,464 / 11,918	$585,640
May 9, 2017	Glendale	United States	Gila River Arena	Kiiara; Kyle	13,818 / 13,818	$256,446
May 11, 2017	San Antonio	United States	Freeman Coliseum	Kiiara; Kyle	6,703 / 6,703	$268,120
May 13, 2017	New Orleans	United States	Smoothie King Center	Kiiara; Kyle	8,430 / 9,300	$506,366
May 16, 2017	Tulsa	United States	BOK Center	Kiiara; Whethan	11,548 / 11,548	$540,592
May 17, 2017	Kansas City	United States	Sprint Center	Kiiara; Whethan	14,481 / 14,481	$307,701
May 18, 2017	St. Louis	United States	Scottrade Center	Kiiara; Whethan	14,471 / 14,471	$207,896
May 19, 2017	Memphis	United States	FedExForum	Kiiara; Whethan	6,610 / 7,800	$371,317
May 20, 2017	Louisville	United States	KFC Yum! Center	Kiiara; Whethan	15,943 / 15,943	$374,638
May 24, 2017	Raleigh	United States	PNC Arena	Kiiara; Whethan	10,352 / 10,352	$429,952
May 25, 2017	Hampton	United States	Hampton Coliseum	Kiiara; Whethan	6,712 / 9,399	$414,774
May 26, 2017	Columbia	United States	Merriweather Post Pavilion	Kiiara; Lost Frequencies	17,553 / 18,000	$538,879
May 30, 2017	Toronto	Canada	Air Canada Centre	Kiiara; Lost Frequencies	12,432 / 12,432	$834,934
June 1, 2017	Montreal	Canada	Bell Centre	Kiiara; Lost Frequencies	14,245 / 14,245	$692,556
June 2, 2017	Boston	United States	TD Garden	Kiiara; Lost Frequencies	14,080 / 14,080	$543,180
June 3, 2017	Philadelphia	United States	Liacouras Center	Kiiara; Whethan	11,794 / 16,348	$748,980
June 4, 2017	Philadelphia	United States	Liacouras Center	Kiiara; Lost Frequencies	11,794 / 16,348	$748,980
June 7, 2017	Providence	United States	Dunkin' Donuts Center	Kiiara; Lost Frequencies	10,051 / 10,051	$461,773
June 9, 2017	New York City	United States	Forest Hills Stadium	Kiiara; Alison Wonderland	26,214 / 26,214	$1,785,832
June 10, 2017	New York City	United States	Forest Hills Stadium	Kiiara; Lost Frequencies	26,214 / 26,214	$1,785,832
Europe
June 26, 2017 (Note: The concert on June 26, 2017 in Belfast is part of Belsonic.)	Belfast	United Kingdom	Ormeau Park	—	—	—
June 27, 2017 (Note: The concert on June 27, 2017 in Floriana is part of Isle of MTV.)	Floriana	Malta	The Granaries	—	—	—
June 28, 2017 (Note: The concert on June 28, 2017 in Milan is part of the Milan Summer Festival.)	Milan	Italy	Ippodromo San Siro	—	—	—
June 29, 2017 (Note: The concert on June 29, 2017 in Werchter is part of Rock Werchter.)	Werchter	Belgium	Werchter Festivalpark	—	—	—
June 30, 2017 (Note: The concert on June 30, 2017 in Norrköping is part of the Bråvalla Festival.)	Norrköping	Sweden	Bråvalla Flygfält	—	—	—
July 1, 2017 (Note: The concert on July 1, 2017 in Kristiansand is part of Palmesus.)	Kristiansand	Norway	Bystranda	—	—	—
July 2, 2017	Sant Jordi de ses Salines	Spain	Ushuaïa Ibiza Beach Hotel	Jonas Blue; Icona Pop; R3WIRE & Varski	—	—
North America
July 4, 2017 (Note: The concert on July 4, 2017 in Milwaukee is part of the Summerfest.)	Milwaukee	United States	American Family Insurance Amphitheater	—	—	—
July 8, 2017 (Note: The concert on July 8, 2017 in Surrey is part of FVDED in the Park.)	Surrey	Canada	Holland Park	—	—	—
July 9, 2017 (Note: The concert on July 9, 2017 in Calgary is part of Calgary Stampede.)	Calgary	Canada	Cowboys Music Festival Tent	—	—	—
July 21, 2017	Paso Robles	United States	Chumash Grandstand Arena	Justin Caruso	—	—
July 22, 2017 (Note: The concert on July 22, 2017 in Indianapolis is part of 400 Fest at the Brickyard.)	Indianapolis	United States	Indianapolis Motor Speedway	—	—	—
Europe
August 2, 2017 (Note: The concert on August 2, 2017 in Odemira is part of MEO Sudoeste.)	Odemira	Portugal	Meo Sudoeste	—	—	—
Asia
August 1, 2017	Byblos	Lebanon	Byblos International Festival	—	—	—
August 3, 2017	Rishon LeZion	Israel	Live Park	—	—	—
Europe
August 4, 2017 (Note: The concerts on August 4, 2017 in Pärnu and Helsinki is part of Weekend Festival and Weekend Festival Baltic.)	Pärnu	Estonia	Pärnu Beach	—	—	—
August 4, 2017	Helsinki	Finland	Kyläsaari	—	—	—
August 13, 2017 (Note: The concert on August 13, 2017 in Budapest is part of Sziget Festival.)	Budapest	Hungary	Hajógyári Island	—	—	—
August 25, 2017 (Note: The concert on August 25, 2017 in Daresbury is part of Creamfields.)	Daresbury	United Kingdom	Creamfields Festival	—	—	—
North America
September 3, 2017 (Note: The concert on September 3, 2017 in Philadelphia is part of Budweiser Made in America Festival.)	Philadelphia	United States	Benjamin Franklin Parkway	—	—	—
Asia
September 7, 2017 (Note: The concerts on September 7, 8, 10 & 17, 2017 are part of Road to Ultra & Ultra Music Festival.)	Mumbai	India	Mahalaxmi Racecourse	—	—	—
September 8, 2017	New Delhi	India	India Expo Mart & Centre	—	—	—
September 10, 2017	Taipei	Taiwan	Dajia Riverside Park	—	—	—
September 11, 2017	Busan	South Korea	KBS Busan Hall	Nick Martin	—	—
September 12, 2017	Seoul	South Korea	Jamsil Arena	Nick Martin	—	—
September 13, 2017	Pasay	Philippines	Mall of Asia Arena	Nick Martin	—	—
September 14, 2017	Ho Chi Minh City	Vietnam	Sala Urban Area	Nick Martin	—	—
September 15, 2017	Bangkok	Thailand	IMPACT Challenger Hall 1	Nick Martin	—	—
September 16, 2017 (Note: The concert on September 16, 2017 in Singapore is part of the Formula 1 2017 Singapore Grand Prix.)	Singapore		Marina Bay Street Circuit	—	—	—
September 17, 2017	Tokyo	Japan	Tokyo Odaiba Ultra Park	—	—	—
Oceania
October 17, 2017	Adelaide	Australia	Adelaide Entertainment Centre	TBA	—	—
October 20, 2017	Melbourne	Australia	Sidney Myer Music Bowl	TBA	—	—
October 21, 2017	Sydney	Australia	Sydney Showgrounds	TBA	—	—
October 22, 2017	Brisbane	Australia	Riverstage	TBA	—	—
October 24, 2017	Auckland	New Zealand	Spark Arena	TBA	—	—
Total					—	—

== Cancelled shows ==
Date	City	Country	Venue	Reason
May 23, 2017	Columbia	United States	Colonial Life Arena	Scheduling conflict
