= Honest (The Chainsmokers song) =

Single by The Chainsmokers

from the album Memories...Do Not Open
- Released: July 11, 2017
- Recorded: 2017
- Genre: Electropop
- Length: 3:29 (album version); 3:12 (radio edit)
- Label: Disruptor; Columbia
- Songwriters: Andrew Taggart; Audra Mae; Sean Douglas
- Producers: The Chainsmokers; DJ Swivel (add.)

The Chainsmokers singles chronology
"Something Just Like This" (2017)	"Honest" (2017)	"Sick Boy" (2018)

"Honest" is a song by American electronic music duo The Chainsmokers. It is the third single from the duo's debut album, Memories...Do Not Open. The song was released to Top 40 radio on July 11, 2017.

== Composition ==
The song is written in the key of E♭ major and has a tempo of 100 beats per minute. The intro features a spoken word part by Bono of U2.

== Track listing ==
Digital download – Remixes EP
No.	Title	Length
1.	"Honest" (Tritonal Remix)	4:19
2.	"Honest" (Lifelike Remix)	3:08
3.	"Honest" (Rootkit Remix)	3:10
4.	"Honest" (SAVI Remix)	3:27
5.	"Honest" (Gil Glaze Remix)	3:32
6.	"Honest" (Maliboux and UNKWN Remix)	3:34

== Charts ==
=== Weekly charts ===
Chart (2017)	Peak position
Belgium (Ultratip Bubbling Under Flanders)	3
Belgium Dance (Ultratop Flanders)	8
Belgium (Ultratip Bubbling Under Wallonia)	26
Belgium Dance (Ultratop Wallonia)	19
Canada Hot 100 (Billboard)	93
Colombia (National-Report)	93
Mexico Ingles Airplay (Billboard)	36
Netherlands (Tipparade)	21
Netherlands (Single Tip)	27
New Zealand Heatseekers (RMNZ)	2
Sweden Heatseeker (Sverigetopplistan)	4
US Billboard Hot 100	77
US Adult Pop Airplay (Billboard)	37
US Dance Airplay (Billboard)	11
US Hot Dance/Electronic Songs (Billboard)	8
US Pop Airplay (Billboard)	19

=== Year-end charts ===
Chart (2017)	Position
US Dance/Electronic Songs (Billboard)	28

== Certifications ==
Region	Certification	Certified units/sales
Australia (ARIA)	Gold	35,000^{‡}
United States (RIAA)	Gold	500,000^{‡}
^{‡} Sales+streaming figures based on certification alone.

== Release history ==
Region	Date	Format	Version	Label	Ref.
United States	July 11, 2017	Top 40 radio	Original	Disruptor; Columbia	
United States	August 4, 2017	Digital download	Remixes EP	Disruptor; Columbia	
