= Bazzi =

Bazzi (Arabic: بزي) is both a South Lebanese surname and a surname from Northern Italy and Ticino. Notable people with the surname include:

- Ahmad Bazzi, French-Lebanese research scientist
- Al-Bazzi (c. 786 – c. 864), Muslim figure who transmitted the Qira'at or Qur'an readings
- Ali Ahmad Bazzi, Lebanese politician
- Andrew Bazzi (born 1997), American singer-songwriter known as Bazzi
- Bill Bazzi (born 1963), American politician
- Elías Bazzi (born 1981), Argentine football player
- Fayssal Bazzi (born 1982), Australian actor
- Gian Bazzi (1931–2016), Swiss ice hockey player
- Giovanni Antonio Bazzi (1477–1549), Italian Renaissance painter known as Il Sodoma
- Khalid Bazzi (1969–2006), Hezbollah commander
- Louay Bazzi, Lebanese-American mathematician
- Mohamad Bazzi (born c. 1975), Lebanese-American journalist
- Patrizia Bazzi (born 1957), Swiss gymnast
