= Young (The Chainsmokers song) =

- Remixes cover

Promotional single by The Chainsmokers

from the album Memories...Do Not Open
- Released: September 29, 2017
- Recorded: 2017
- Length: 3:44
- Label: Disruptor; Columbia
- Songwriters: Andrew Taggart; Taylor Bird; Peter Hanna; Sean Jacobs; Jordan Young
- Producers: The Chainsmokers; DJ Swivel

"Young" is a song by American electronic music duo The Chainsmokers. A remixed version was released as the second promotional single from the duo's debut album, Memories...Do Not Open. The song appears in support of the Tommy Hilfiger Fall 2017 campaign.

== Live performances ==
On May 21, 2017, The Chainsmokers performed "Young" at the 2017 Billboard Music Awards. They also performed the song at the 2017 Jingle Bell Ball at The O2 Arena in London on Sunday 10 December 2017.

== Video ==
A lyric video was released in June 2017, featuring childhood pictures and baby photos along with moments captured on their recently completed Memories... Do Not Open Tour.

A 30-second clip of the video appeared at the TommyXTheChainsmokers Fall Campaign event.

== Track listing ==
Digital download – Midnight Kids Remix
No.	Title	Length
1.	"Young" (Midnight Kids Remix)	3:48

Digital download – Remixes
No.	Title	Length
1.	"Young" (k?d Remix)	5:32
2.	"Young" (KO:YU Remix)	3:32
3.	"Young" (Midnight Kids Remix)	3:48

== Charts ==
Chart (2017)	Peak position
Canada (Canadian Hot 100)	65
Sweden Heatseeker (Sverigetopplistan)	13
US Hot Dance/Electronic Songs (Billboard)	18

=== Year-end charts ===
Chart (2017)	Position
US Dance/Electronic Songs (Billboard)	55

== Release history ==
Region	Date	Format	Label	Version	Ref.
Various	September 29, 2017	Digital download	Disruptor; Columbia	Midnight Kids remix	
Various	December 15, 2017	Digital download	Disruptor; Columbia	Remixes	

== Certifications ==
Region	Certification	Certified units/sales
Brazil (Pro-Música Brasil)	Gold	30,000^{‡}
United States (RIAA)	Gold	500,000^{‡}
^{‡} Sales+streaming figures based on certification alone.
