= The One (The Chainsmokers song) =

Promotional single by The Chainsmokers

from the album Memories...Do Not Open
- Released: March 27, 2017
- Recorded: 2016–17
- Genre: Pop
- Length: 2:57
- Label: Disruptor; Columbia
- Songwriters: Andrew Taggart; Emily Warren; Scott Harris
- Producers: The Chainsmokers; Jordan "DJ Swivel" Young

"The One" is a song recorded by The Chainsmokers for their debut studio album Memories...Do Not Open (2017). The song was released as the first promotional single from the album on March 27, 2017. It was co-written with frequent collaborators Scott Harris and Emily Warren.

== Background ==
The tempo was slower in this song, compared to The Chainsmokers' previous songs. It is sung by Andrew Taggart. YourEDM described the song as a mellow track that "begins with ballad and slightly drops into EDM at the climax, as the bass kicks in". MTV described it as a "heavyhearted breakup song".

== Charts ==
=== Weekly charts ===
Chart (2017)	Peak position
Australia (ARIA)	36
Austria (Ö3 Austria Top 40)	30
Belgium (Ultratip Bubbling Under Flanders)	4
Belgium (Ultratip Bubbling Under Wallonia)	16
Canada Hot 100 (Billboard)	30
Czech Republic Singles Digital (ČNS IFPI)	16
France (SNEP)	192
Germany (GfK)	47
Ireland (IRMA)	30
Italy (FIMI)	36
Malaysia (RIM)	6
Netherlands (Single Top 100)	47
New Zealand Heatseekers (RMNZ)	3
Philippines (Philippine Hot 100)	86
Portugal (AFP)	47
Scotland Singles (OCC)	37
Slovakia Singles Digital (ČNS IFPI)	23
Spain (PROMUSICAE)	82
Sweden (Sverigetopplistan)	20
Switzerland (Schweizer Hitparade)	36
UK Singles (OCC)	63
US Billboard Hot 100	78
US Hot Dance/Electronic Songs (Billboard)	10

=== Year-end charts ===
Chart (2017)	Position
US Dance/Electronic Songs (Billboard)	34

== Certifications ==
Region	Certification	Certified units/sales
Australia (ARIA)	Gold	35,000^{‡}
Italy (FIMI)	Gold	25,000^{‡}
New Zealand (RMNZ)	Gold	15,000^{‡}
United States (RIAA)	Gold	500,000^{‡}
^{‡} Sales+streaming figures based on certification alone.
