= Memories...Do Not Open =

Studio album by The Chainsmokers
- Released: April 7, 2017
- Genres: Electropop; EDM
- Length: 43:19
- Labels: Disruptor; Columbia
- Producer: The Chainsmokers

The Chainsmokers chronology
Collage (2016)	Memories...Do Not Open (2017)	Sick Boy...You Owe Me (2018)

The Chainsmokers studio album chronology
Memories...Do Not Open (2017)	Sick Boy (2018)

Singles from Memories...Do Not Open
- 1. "Paris" Released: January 13, 2017; 2. "Something Just Like This" Released: February 22, 2017; 3. "Honest" Released: July 11, 2017

Memories...Do Not Open is the debut studio album by American electronic music duo the Chainsmokers, released on April 7, 2017, by Disruptor Records and Columbia Records. Its release was preceded by the singles "Paris" and "Something Just Like This" (in collaboration with Coldplay), both of which reached the top 10 in several national charts. Upon its release, the album received generally mixed reviews from music critics. The album debuted at number one on the US Billboard 200 with 221,000 album-equivalent units, of which 166,000 were pure album sales.

== Background ==
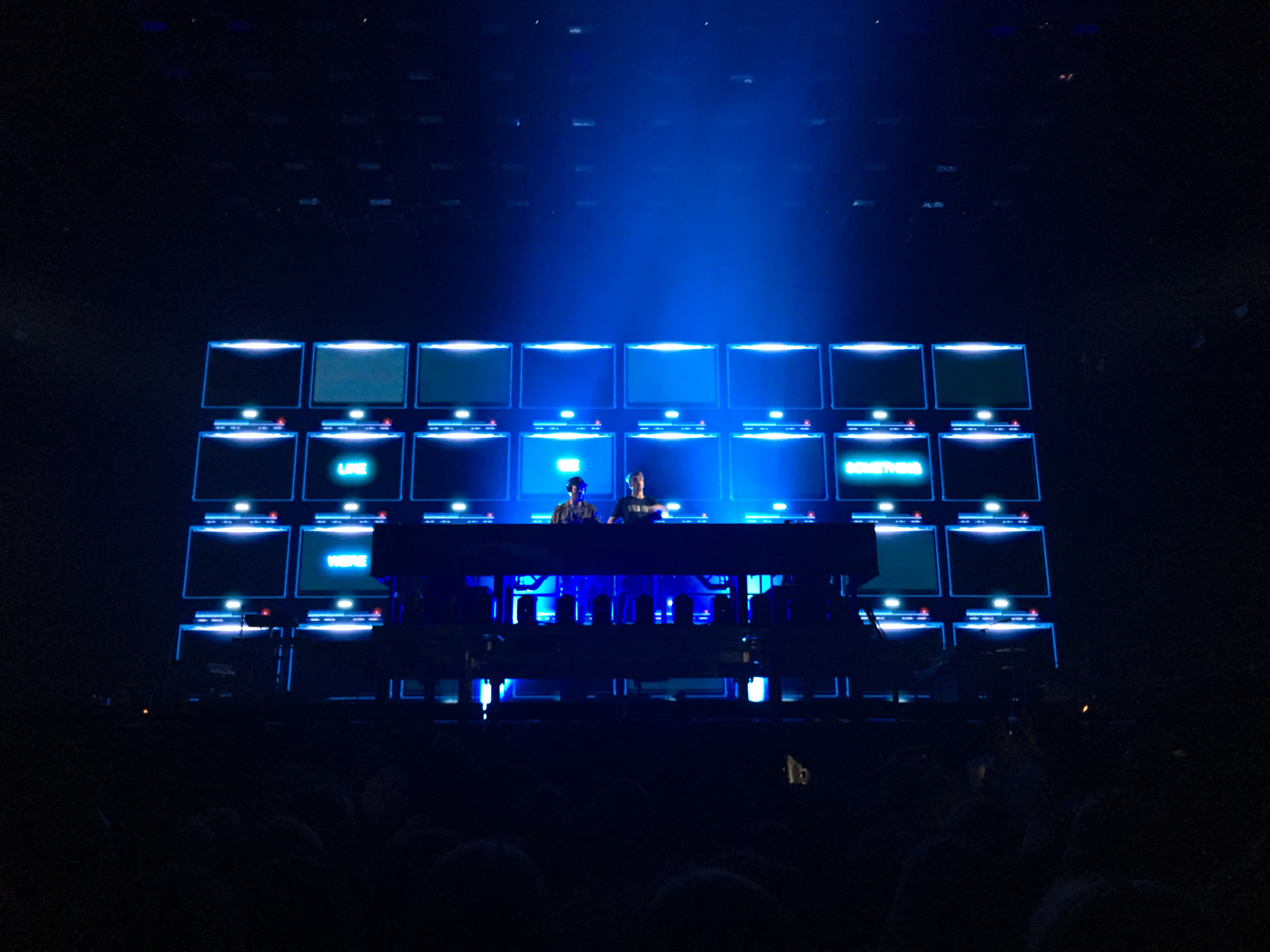
The Chainsmokers performing at the American Airlines Arena for their "Memories...Do Not Open" tour

Chris Martin of Coldplay had first tweeted about the album, prompting the Chainsmokers to confirm it. It was revealed during an on-screen Grammy red carpet interview with the duo that their album title was to be named Memories...Do Not Open and it would be released on April 7, just before they embarked on the tour of the same name. As seen in the interview, Taggart was hesitant after revealing the release date of the album, before asking Pall if he should say it. Taggart said "We're ready. We've got a full album; it's going to be amazing. It's coming out April 7, was I supposed to say that?" before Pall responded "No, but it's alright".

== Singles ==
The lead single, "Paris", was released on January 13, 2017. The lead single peaked at number 6 on the Billboard Hot 100. The song went on to receive multiple certifications.

The second single, "Something Just Like This", which is a collaboration with British alternative rock band Coldplay, was released on February 22, 2017, along with the pre-order of the album. The single peaked at number 3 on the Billboard Hot 100 chart. During the week of March 18, 2017, "Something Just Like This", "Paris", along with "Closer", were simultaneously within the top 10 of the Billboard Hot 100, making the Chainsmokers the third group to have three simultaneous top 10 hits.

The third single, "Honest", was sent to top 40 radio on July 11, 2017. The single peaked at number 77 on the Billboard Hot 100.

=== Promotional singles ===
A promotional single, titled "The One", was released on March 27, 2017, and reached number 78 on the Billboard Hot 100.

Another promotional single, a remixed version of "Young" by Midnight Kids, was released on September 29, 2017.

== Critical reception ==
Professional ratings
Aggregate scores
Source	Rating
AnyDecentMusic?	4.3/10
Metacritic	43/100
Review scores
Source	Rating
AllMusic	2/5 stars
Entertainment Weekly	C+
Financial Times	2/5 stars
The Observer	2/5 stars
Pitchfork	4.2/10
Rolling Stone	2/5 stars
Slant Magazine	2.5/5 stars
Spectrum Culture	3/5 stars
The Times	2/5 stars

At Metacritic, which assigns a normalized rating out of 100 to reviews from critics, the album received an average score of 43, based on eight reviews, indicating "mixed or average reviews".

Damien Morris of The Observer gave a two-out-of-five star review, describing the group's music as, "instantly memorable yet completely forgettable", comparing the album to US President Donald Trump, "shallow, always betraying its influences, with a third-grade vocabulary and ambition that runs no further than emptying the nearest wallet." In Entertainment Weekly, Barry Walters highlighted the duo's commercial success, describing their style as, "smoothed-out, mid-tempo, nearly easy-listening formula", but opined it sounds, "as if you're playing the radio instead of one solitary album". He considered "Break Up Every Night" as the only dance cut, while "the other cuts are basically ballads with beats — modernized Moby without the soul-searching or gospel samples."

Sal Cinquemani from Slant Magazine gave the album two stars out of five, criticizing Taggart's lack of personality and vocal ability. Additionally, Cinquemani stated, "the downside to the wild success of that approach is that Taggart and Pall have been forced to discover their creative voices in front of the whole world. And unfortunately, the sound they've settled on is parked firmly in the middle of the road." On AllMusic, Neil Yeung also gave a two-out-of-five star review, calling Memories...Do Not Open a, "calculated dose of millennial escapism that peddles the same sounds as their far more engaging EP work." Maeve McDermott of USA Today questioned, "is this the worst album of 2017?", calling Taggart's vocals "hilariously bad". Philip Sherburne of Pitchfork claimed that, "The debut album from the celebrity production duo is a somber departure from their EDM days—a lifeless, anodyne pop record that wallows in basic feelings of regret and narcissism." Along with comparing the album to 2014 single "#SELFIE", Sherburne wrote, "None of it sounds anything like '#SELFIE,' but its worldview is barely any bigger than that song's narrow perspective".

Jon Caramanica from The New York Times called the album a "savvy success that cannily toys with expectations" with its songs veering from the "usual gut punch" approach for its drops, but felt that the record is a "meaningless concept" in the "big-festival dance music" where the duo thrived in. He also commented on Taggart's "capable but unexciting" vocal performance and his "shockingly" few lyrical ideas, with most of the album's songs "[moaning] about brittle young relationships". Jordan Sargent of Spin observed the monotony of the record, stating: "The Chainsmokers have one song, and if you don’t want to hear 12 versions of it, please do not un-click the latch holding this box closed." He noted Taggart's "unique" vocal accessibility for listeners, but felt that his charm dissipated as the album wears on which resulted in a "series of songs that bleed endlessly into each other".

On Metacritic, Memories...Do Not Open stands as the lowest ranked album of 2017.

== Commercial performance ==
Memories...Do Not Open debuted at number one on the Billboard 200 with 221,000 album-equivalent units, of which 166,000 were pure album sales. As of May 22, 2026, the album has moved 2,000,000 album-equivalent units in the United States.

== Track listing ==
Standard edition
No.	Title	Writer(s)	Producer(s)	Length
1.	"The One"	Andrew Taggart; Scott Harris; Emily Warren	The Chainsmokers; DJ Swivel^{[v]}	2:57
2.	"Break Up Every Night"	Taggart; Ben Berger; Michael Kamerman; Beau Kuther; Ryan McMahon; Ryan Rabin; Sean Scanlon	The Chainsmokers; Captain Cuts^{[c]}; DJ Swivel^{[v]}	3:27
3.	"Bloodstream"	Taggart; Matthew Holmes; Philip Leigh; Kane Parfitt; Philip Plested; Phoebe Holiday Ryan	The Chainsmokers; KIN^{[c]}; Mac & Phil^{[c]}; DJ Swivel^{[a]}^{[v]}	3:44
4.	"Don't Say" (featuring Emily Warren)	Taggart; Warren; Imad Royal; Joni Fatora; Brenton Duvall	The Chainsmokers; DJ Swivel^{[v]}	3:48
5.	"Something Just Like This" (with Coldplay)	Taggart; Chris Martin; Guy Berryman; Jonny Buckland; Will Champion	The Chainsmokers	4:07
6.	"My Type" (featuring Emily Warren)	Taggart; Warren; Brittany Marie Burton	The Chainsmokers	3:37
7.	"It Won't Kill Ya" (featuring Louane)	Taggart; Sam Martin; A.S. Govere	The Chainsmokers; DJ Swivel^{[a]}^{[v]}	3:37
8.	"Paris"	Taggart; Kristoffer Eriksson; Fredrik Häggstam; Charlee Nyman	The Chainsmokers; DJ Swivel^{[v]}	3:41
9.	"Honest"	Taggart; Audra Mae; Sean Maxwell Douglas	The Chainsmokers; DJ Swivel^{[a]}^{[v]}	3:28
10.	"Wake Up Alone" (featuring Jhené Aiko)	Taggart; Harris; Warren	The Chainsmokers; DJ Swivel^{[v]}	3:35
11.	"Young"	Taggart; Taylor Bird; Peter Hanna; Sean Jacobs; Jordan Young	The Chainsmokers; DJ Swivel^{[a]}^{[v]}	3:44
12.	"Last Day Alive" (featuring Florida Georgia Line)	Taggart; Dan Reynolds; Ido Zmishlany	The Chainsmokers; Joey Moi^{[v]}	3:34
Total length:				43:19

Japanese edition bonus tracks
No.	Title	Writer(s)	Producer(s)	Length
13.	"Closer" (featuring Halsey)	Taggart; Ashley Frangipane; Shaun Frank; Frederic Kennett; Isaac Slade; Joe King	The Chainsmokers	4:04
14.	"Don't Let Me Down" (featuring Daya)	Taggart; Warren; Harris	The Chainsmokers	3:28
15.	"Roses" (featuring Rozes)	Taggart; Elizabeth Mencel	The Chainsmokers	3:46
Total length:				54:37

- ^{[a]} signifies additional producer
- ^{[c]} signifies co-producer
- ^{[v]} signifies vocal producer

== Personnel ==
Credits are adapted from Memories...Do Not Open CD liner notes.

The Chainsmokers

- Andrew Taggart
- Alex Pall

Additional musicians

- Emily Warren – vocals (4, 6), background vocals (1, 8)
- Sean Scanlon – additional vocals (2)
- Jordan Young – background/additional vocals (2, 8)
- Phoebe Ryan – background vocals (2)
- Kane Parfitt – piano(2), keyboards (2)
- Philip Plested – guitar (2)
- Matthew Holmes – sampling and programming (2)
- Philip Leigh – sampling and programming (2)
- Chris Martin – vocals (5), piano (5)
- Guy Berryman – bass guitar (5)
- Jonny Buckland – lead guitar (5)
- Will Champion – drums (5), backing vocals (5), programming (5)
- Louane – vocals (7)
- Harry Roberts – background vocals (8)
- Jhené Aiko – vocals (10)
- Jeremy Most – guitars (11)
- Jonathan Perkins – string arrangement (11)
- Brian Kelley – vocals (12)
- Tyler Hubbard – vocals (12)

Design and managerial

- James Zwadlo – photography, creative direction
- Olivia Smith – package design
- Adam Alpert – management

Production

- The Chainsmokers – producers (all)
- Adam Alpert – executive producer
- Alex Pall – executive producer
- Captain Cuts – co-production (2)
- KIN – co-production (2)
- Mac & Phil – co-production (2)
- Jordan "DJ Swivel" Young – additional production (3, 7, 9, 11), vocal production, mixing, recording (1–4, 7–11)
- Chris Gehringer – mastering
- Emily Lazar – mastering (5)
- Chris Allgood – mastering assistant (5)
- Nicole "Coco" Llorens – recording assistant (1, 7, 9)
- Martin Gray – recording assistant (2, 11)
- Desi Aguilar – recording assistant (3)
- Rik Simpson – recording (band tracks) (5)
- Owen Butcher – recording assistant (band tracks) (5)
- Daniel Green – recording (additional band tracks) (5)
- Tony Smith – recording assistant (additional band tracks) (5)
- Bill Rahko – recording (vocals and piano) (5)
- Aleks Von Korff – recording assistant (vocals and piano) (6)
- Adam Catania – recording (6)
- Matthew Holmes – recording (6)
- Philip Leigh – recording (6)
- Emily Warren – recording (6)
- Alex Pall – recording (8)
- Brian Warfield – recording (10)
- Joey Moi – vocal production (12)
- Eivind Nordland – vocal editing (12)

== Charts ==
=== Weekly charts ===
Weekly chart performance for Memories...Do Not Open
Chart (2017)	Peak position
Australian Albums (ARIA)	4
Australian Dance Albums (ARIA)	1
Austrian Albums (Ö3 Austria)	9
Belgian Albums (Ultratop Flanders)	2
Belgian Albums (Ultratop Wallonia)	19
Canadian Albums (Billboard)	1
Czech Albums (ČNS IFPI)	2
Danish Albums (Hitlisten)	7
Dutch Albums (Album Top 100)	3
Finnish Albums (Suomen virallinen lista)	3
French Albums (SNEP)	25
German Albums (Offizielle Top 100)	11
Hungarian Albums (MAHASZ)	27
Irish Albums (IRMA)	3
Italian Albums (FIMI)	8
Japanese Albums (Oricon)	6
Japan Hot Albums (Billboard Japan)	3
Latvian Albums (LaIPA)	29
New Zealand Albums (RMNZ)	4
Norwegian Albums (VG-lista)	2
Portuguese Albums (AFP)	17
Scottish Albums (Official Charts)	5
Slovak Albums (ČNS IFPI)	3
South Korean Albums (Circle)	29
South Korean International Albums (Circle)	1
Spanish Albums (Promusicae)	11
Swedish Albums (Sverigetopplistan)	3
Swiss Albums (Schweizer Hitparade)	9
Taiwanese Albums (Five Music)	1
UK Albums (Official Charts)	3
UK Dance Albums (Official Charts)	1
US Billboard 200	1
US Top Dance Albums (Billboard)	1

=== Year-end charts ===
2017 year-end chart performance for Memories...Do Not Open
Chart (2017)	Position
Australian Albums (ARIA)	39
Australian Dance Albums (ARIA)	1
Belgian Albums (Ultratop Flanders)	84
Canadian Albums (Billboard)	11
Danish Albums (Hitlisten)	78
Dutch Albums (MegaCharts)	47
French Albums (SNEP)	83
Italian Albums (FIMI)	57
Japanese Albums (Oricon)	93
New Zealand Albums (RMNZ)	31
Norwegian Albums (VG-lista)	25
South Korean International Albums (Circle)	24
Swedish Albums (Sverigetopplistan)	12
UK Albums (OCC)	90
US Billboard 200	21
US Top Dance/Electronic Albums (Billboard)	1

2018 year-end chart performance for Memories...Do Not Open
Chart (2018)	Position
Swedish Albums (Sverigetopplistan)	90
US Billboard 200	129
US Top Dance/Electronic Albums (Billboard)	1

2019 year-end chart performance for Memories...Do Not Open
Chart (2019)	Position
US Top Dance/Electronic Albums (Billboard)	5

2020 year-end chart performance for Memories...Do Not Open
Chart (2020)	Position
US Top Dance/Electronic Albums (Billboard)	7

2021 year-end chart performance for Memories...Do Not Open
Chart (2021)	Position
US Top Dance/Electronic Albums (Billboard)	9

2022 year-end chart performance for Memories...Do Not Open
Chart (2022)	Position
US Top Dance/Electronic Albums (Billboard)	7

2023 year-end chart performance for Memories...Do Not Open
Chart (2023)	Position
US Top Dance/Electronic Albums (Billboard)	10

2024 year-end chart performance for Memories...Do Not Open
Chart (2024)	Position
US Top Dance/Electronic Albums (Billboard)	14

2025 year-end chart performance for Memories...Do Not Open
Chart (2025)	Position
US Top Dance Albums (Billboard)	17

== Certifications ==
Certifications for Memories...Do Not Open
Region	Certification	Certified units/sales
Australia (ARIA)	Gold	35,000^{‡}
Brazil (Pro-Música Brasil)	Gold	20,000^{‡}
Canada (Music Canada)	3× Platinum	240,000^{‡}
Denmark (IFPI Danmark)	Platinum	20,000^{‡}
France (SNEP)	Platinum	100,000^{‡}
Germany (BVMI)	Gold	100,000^{‡}
Italy (FIMI)	Gold	25,000^{*}
Mexico (AMPROFON)	Gold	30,000^{‡}
New Zealand (RMNZ)	3× Platinum	45,000^{‡}
Norway (IFPI Norway)	Platinum	20,000^{‡}
Poland (ZPAV)	Platinum	20,000^{‡}
Sweden (GLF)	Platinum	30,000^{‡}
United Kingdom (BPI)	Gold	100,000^{‡}
United States (RIAA)	2× Platinum	2,000,000^{‡}
^{*} Sales figures based on certification alone.^{‡} Sales+streaming figures based on certification alone.

== See also ==
- List of Billboard 200 number-one albums of 2017
- List of Billboard number-one electronic albums of 2017
- List of number-one albums of 2017 (Canada)
