= I Care (Beyoncé song) =

Single by Beyoncé

from the album 4
- Released: March 23, 2012
- Recorded: 2011
- Studio: MSR Studios (New York City)
- Genre: R&B
- Length: 3:59
- Label: Columbia
- Songwriters: Beyoncé Knowles; Chad Hugo; Jeff Bhasker
- Producer: Jeff Bhasker

Beyoncé singles chronology
"Countdown" (2011)	"I Care" (2012)	"End of Time" (2012)

Audio video
- "I Care" on YouTube

"I Care" is a song recorded by the American singer Beyoncé for her fourth studio album, 4 (2011). It was written by Jeff Bhasker, Chad Hugo and Beyoncé and produced by Bhasker and co-produced by Beyoncé with Hugo playing rhythm guitar. The song was recorded at the MSR Studios and was mixed by Jordan Young aka DJ Swivel at KMA Studio in New York City. "I Care" is an R&B power ballad, which also contains elements of soul music and rock music. Built on a hand-clapped rhythm and pulsating beats, the song's instrumentation consists of screeching guitars, low-profile synthesizers, pounding drums, heavy percussion instrument and a piano. In "I Care", Beyoncé admits her vulnerability to her indifferent love interest with both honesty and power. She sings with heartfelt emotion over cooing background vocals and scats alongside a multi-octave guitar solo towards the end of the song. "I Care" was sent to contemporary hit radio in Italy on March 23, 2012 as the seventh overall single from 4.

"I Care" was acclaimed by contemporary music critics who highlighted the heartfelt emotion, sadness and resentment with which Beyoncé sings. Critics also complimented the way she made effective use out the power in her lower register in the first and second verses until her voice slowly builds until the commanding chorus is reached. They generally praised the guitar solo and the vocal power of Beyoncé which was displayed by "I Care" among other songs on 4. Following the release of 4 in early July 2011, "I Care" charted number 35 on the South Korea Gaon International Singles Chart, based on downloads alone. The song was part of Beyoncé's set list for her revues 4 Intimate Nights with Beyoncé (2011) and Revel Presents: Beyoncé Live (2012) as well as The Mrs. Carter Show World Tour (2013). It was also used as an interlude in her The Formation World Tour (2016).

== Background ==
"I Care" was written by Jeff Bhasker, Chad Hugo and Beyoncé while production was handled by Bhasker and Beyoncé. A private listening party for Beyoncé's fourth studio album, 4, was held on May 12, 2011. She offered a select group of fans a preview of five songs from 4 and the official video for the lead single "Run the World (Girls)". On that occasion, "I Care" was one of the songs previewed. Beginning on June 16 to June 27, 2011, the songs from 4 were available to listen to in full each day on Beyoncé's official website, paired with its accompanying photo spread from the album packaging and an insightful quote. On June 17, 2011, "I Care" was the second song to be chosen. The quote found Beyoncé commenting that "I Care" is one of the many ballads which take on matters of the heart. In February 2013, Bhasker revealed that the song was initially written for his first studio album Born on the Fourth of July released in July 2013. He described the sound of his version of "I Care" as "a little more pure version".

== Production ==
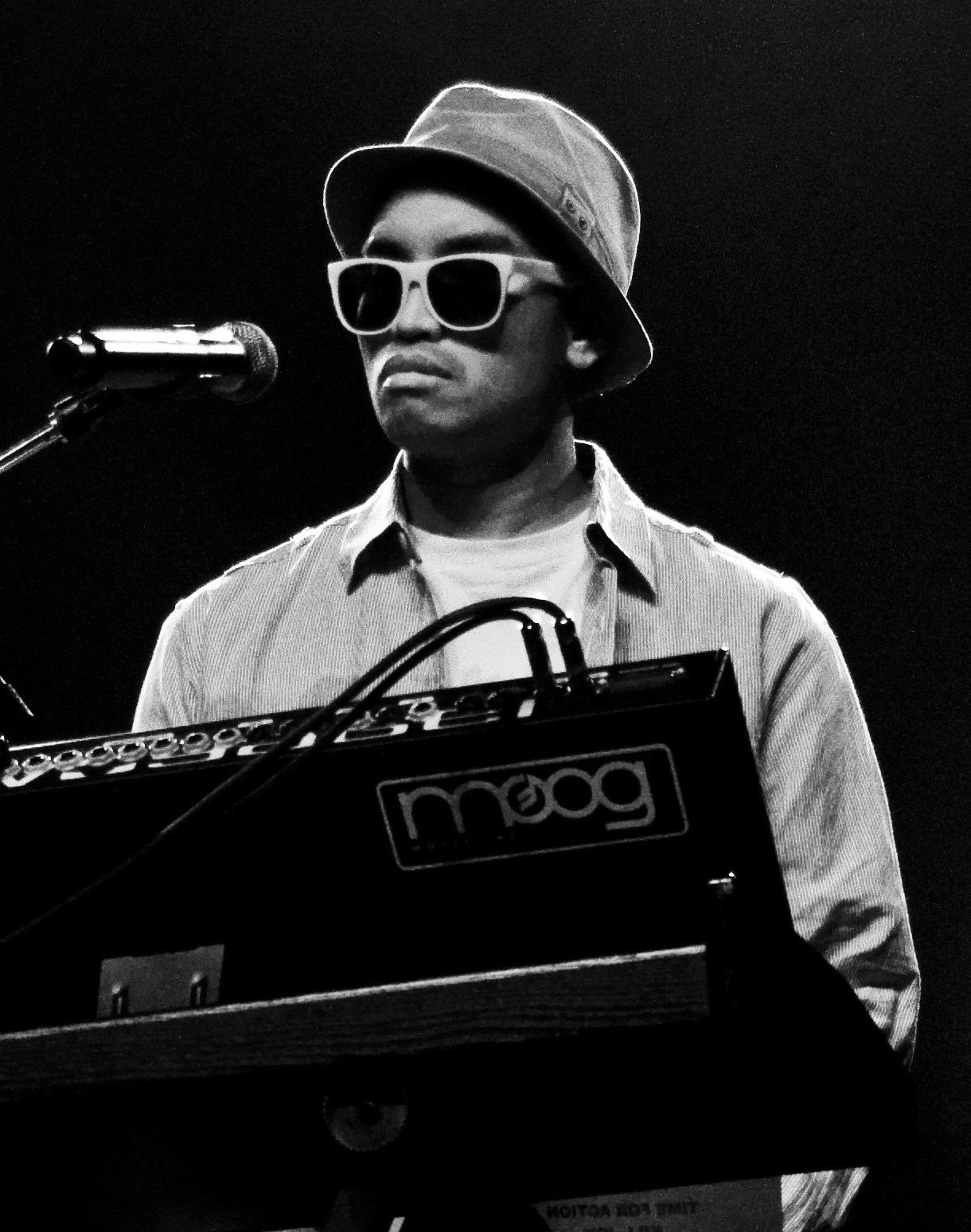
Chad Hugo (pictured) played Rhythm Guitar and co-wrote the song with Jeff Bhasker and Beyoncé.

Jordan Young aka DJ Swivel mixed "I Care" at New York's KMA Studio. He told Sound on Sound, "I didn’t really know I was going to mix 'I Care' until the last minute. Luckily, during the course of the album, I had a couple of days to myself and I mixed it just because I felt like it, so the demo was already somewhat mixed, and B[eyoncé] let me do the final mix also."

"I Care" comprised 75 tracks in total: 35 for the music and 40 for the vocals. According to Swivel, the main challenge in mixing "I Care" was hand‑aligning every single drum shot as it was time-consuming. He said, "It's super‑monotonous, but it's the best way I can do it. If you Beat Detective the drums to the grid, it's never perfect." As the layering of the drums had to be right on the millisecond, Swivel did one kick and snare at a time. This helped him ensure that the kicks line up with the programmed drums, hence preventing any phase inversion. Accordingly, each drum punched through as strongly as the last. The inspiration for the main drum sound on "I Care" came to Swivel at around four o'clock in the morning during a mixing session. He took a large plate sound from Avid’s D‑Verb plug‑in, rolled the high frequencies off at 8.6 kHz, and sent it through an SSL channel strip with a gate on it, setting the release time to 0.6 seconds. He said, "It's a really basic plug‑in, and I used a very [19]80s‑sounding gated reverb."

I am a producer as well, so part of what I think when I am mixing is: 'What is the sound the producer was trying to achieve?’ Sometimes a plug‑in won’t get that sound, so I’ll often take creative freedoms by doing some drum replacement, and if a producer doesn’t like it, it’s as simple as a mute — it’s no big deal. It’s never to change the sound; it’s just a utilitarian thing, to help execute a sound.

— DJ Swivel, Sound on Sound

Once he had the sound, he rolled off the bottom to "take the muddiness out". It was actually double reverbed; the gated reverb was only on the snares and the toms, and the rest of the kit as a whole had another plate reverb, which came off the Lexicon 960, for smoothing it out. Swivel said that it actually took him five minutes. According to him, the sound obtained was "a little unorthodox" and therefore, he tried to refine it. Beyoncé thought that it was better the way Swivel did it originally. Swivel commented, "... and in all honesty, whatever works first is usually going to work best. You end up finding something you like about it, and that's where the emotional attachment to a sound comes into play." Swivel often replaces or augments sounds with samples, trying to realise the producer's vision. Similarly in "I Care", he added a couple of kicks underneath the original kick and pitched them down an octave, so that "[the listener] could not hear them but could feel them on big speakers." Swivel further said that it started with "a dark, almost warehouse‑sounding" kick, and he then added a little thump to it.

Swivel dedicated much time in getting the vocal sound right, which according to him is crucial while working with Beyoncé's music. He further explained, "I only put a quick EQ on the vocal at the end of a recording session if I have been cutting her, but mixing is far more particular, so I spent a lot of time dialling in the perfect frequency." For the delay throws in the verses on "I Care", he sent it through a large hall reverb at 50 percent — half reverb, half clean — then through an Amp Farm plug‑in for the grittiness, and that then went through a quarter‑note delay. In the bridge, Beyoncé matches the guitar solo vocally — that was doubled — and one of the vocal tracks has an Amp Farm on it to add to that grittiness. To do justice to the multitude of vocal tracks within the song, Swivel created a stereo field using some clever panning techniques and a Waves S1 Imager plug‑in. He said that it was worth noting that whenever he mixes a record, "I hate hard‑panned L/R. To get the right width, I pan them all differently in pairs: 40/40, 60/60, 70/70, 80/80, 90/90, and OK, maybe one is 100/100, but this process is ultimately what creates the stereo field." Swivel used Waves' SSL E‑Channel plug‑in to shape Beyoncé's lead vocal. He took a Waves S1 Imager and spread with that without isolating he width. He added that something is hard‑panned, it feels too isolated and also confuses the listener's ears. Swivel explained further, "I like smooth sound, and with B[eyoncé] that works fine as she’s so good at matching everything. I like a wall of background vocals. It's the best way of putting your vocal in every area of the stereo field: a wide sound, but you’ve still got something there in the middle."

== Composition and lyrical interpretation ==
"I Care" is an R&B power ballad. According to Cameron Adams of the Herald Sun, the song contains elements of futuristic soul music and rock music. It is built on a hand-clapped rhythm, various melodies, pulsating as well as palpitating beats and a lone synth note underneath. "I Care" is instrumentally complete with screeching guitars, synthesizers, a thrashing drum machine, dense percussion instrument, and a piano. Holly Gleason of Paste magazine commented that "I Care" aurally resembles Peter Gabriel's "Solsbury Hill" (1977). Joey Guerra of the Houston Chronicle and Matthew Horton of BBC felt that the emotion and the chords present in "I Care" are reminiscent of Prince's "Purple Rain" (1984). Horton added that it "near-equals '1+1' and 'I Miss You' tug heartstrings too". Jim Farber of the Daily News wrote that Beyoncé's vocals over the guitar solo on "I Care" could have spun off a song by Journey. The New York Times' Jon Caramanica compared the song with Janet Jackson's earlier materials. Melinda Newman of the website HitFix compared the echo-chamber beats with Phil Collins' work and also noted that it was similar with Leona Lewis' material.

"I Care"
A 24-second sample of "I Care" on which Beyoncé sings with "a devastating blend of sadness and resentment" over distant humming synthesizers, pounding drums and a tumbling beat. She adopts raspy and husky growls, on the guitar solo, after which the song surges during the cathartic chorus, "Well I care / I know you don’t care too much, but I still care".

Throughout the song, Beyoncé airs out her feelings to an indifferent partner, and delivers "indignation and beauty in equal measure", as stated by Greg Kot of the Chicago Tribune. This view was echoed by Erika Ramirez of Billboard magazine, who wrote that Beyoncé endorses "beauty in honesty and, ironically, power in admitting her vulnerability", and Lewis Corner of Digital Spy, who noted that the "raspy and husky growls" that she adopts occasionally, show "offering moments of raw, heartfelt emotion". Gleason wrote that the song writhes through the ache and the obsession that come from being the one left in love. Newman noted that in "I Care", Beyoncé was "spurred and left for dead" by her lover but despite her best efforts, she still cares about him. She sings over cooing background vocals, and her voice moves "from silken to powerful, torn to potent".

Over ominous keys, a keyboard opening and a repeating drum loop in the first verse, Beyoncé sings about how her relationship turned sour and puts all her cards on the table, "I told you how you hurt me, baby / But you don't care / Now I'm crying and deserted, baby / But you don't care / Ain't nobody tell me this is love / You're immune to all my pain / I need you to tell me this love / You don't care, well, that's OK". While singing the first and second verses, she pulls out the power in her lower register. Each time, her voice slowly builds until the commanding chorus is reached, where towards the end, she sings, "la la la", in a muted saxophone line. Her voice expresses anger as she sings the chorus lines. In the second verse, Beyoncé continues the "wild-eyed pleas", as stated by Guerra and sings the lines, "Even since you knew your power / you made me cry / And now every time our love goes sour / you won't sympathize". Her raw vocals then punch through most powerfully at the second chorus leading up to the bridge. After the bridge, Beyoncé, this time, scats the chorus alongside a multi-octave guitar solo.

== Critical reception ==
"I Care" was highly acclaimed by critics. Joanne Dorken of MTV UK wrote that "I Care" proves why Beyoncé "is still the best in the business", further adding that her vocals are flawless as she belts out notes "we didn't even realise were possible." Similarly, David Amidon of PopMatters who stated that "1+1 provides Beyoncé a song that "can compete with the favorites of this generation's parents", later wrote that "1+1" and "I Care" are "equally competent, if safer, attempts at the same formula". He added that the songs explain why she is "head and shoulders above her Clear Channel competition in R&B". However, he concluded that the two songs are misplaced on the tracklising of the album as "I Care" is "a jilted lover track" directly after "a pure love song" as "1+1". The Chicago Sun-Times' Thomas Conner commented that "I Care" is a "sad but superb" song. Holly Gleason of Paste magazine noted that "I Care" creates "a backdrop for Knowles' shaft of vocal power", hinting that she played Etta James in the musical biopic Cadillac Records (2008).

Genevieve Koski of The A.V. Club commented that "4 sees [Beyoncé] stretching out vocally, particularly on the heart-rending 'I Care'." Rich Juzwiak of The Village Voice commented that "I Care" is one of several four songs in which "deceptive calm gives way to intensity-cum-chorus", and commended how Beyoncé's essence "trembles with feeling, she seizes with emotion [and] her voice flutters with the intensity of a hummingbird". Brandon Lewis of Blogcritics commended how she makes maximum use of the power in her lower register, which according to him, is very effective with the song's "relatively short, punchy phrasing". Ian Walker of AbsolutePunk commented that Beyoncé and "the backing production" ebb and flow as the song proceeds, and added that toward the end, she channels her inner Mariah Carey and ultimately "puts the older star to shame". Similarly, Craig Jenkins of Prefix Magazine praised how effortlessly Beyoncé scats along with the multi-octave guitar solo.

Matthew Perpetua of Rolling Stone wrote that though the song may not be an obvious single, it remains one of the finest tracks on the record. Ben Cardew of Music Week called "I Care" an "early highlight" on 4, further praising its instrumentation and the fact that the song "feels touched with sadness, largely thanks to a fantastic chorus". He also noted that "I Care" bears resemblance to some of The Neptunes' "classy early tracks". Andy Gill of The Independent wrote that "I Care" makes good use of Surfer Blood's 2010 song "Twin Peaks"' two-chord motif. Chad Grischow of IGN commented "I Care" is one of the songs on which the Beyoncé's vocals are superior to the lyrics, "as the lame hook pleads, 'But I care / I know you don't care too much / But I still care'". NME's Hamish MacBain showed appreciation of the guitar solo, the lyrics and the "off-kilter drums and moody synths" on "I Care". Neil McCormick of The Daily Telegraph viewed "I Care" as an old-fashioned power ballad.

== Live performances ==
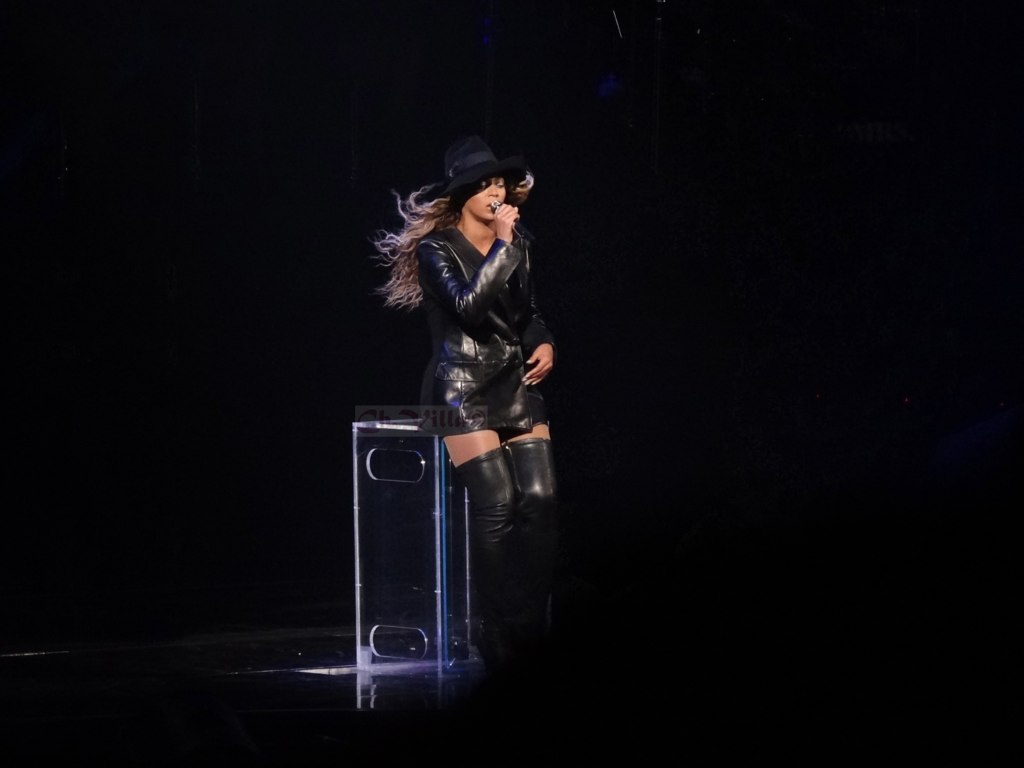
Beyoncé performing "I Care" during The Mrs. Carter Show World Tour in 2013

Beyoncé performed "I Care" live for first time on August 14, 2011 during her residency show 4 Intimate Nights with Beyoncé at the Roseland Ballroom in New York City. She performed the song in front of 3,500 people wearing a gold dress and backed by her all-female band and her backing singers, called the Mamas. Jocelyn Vena of MTV News commented that on "I Care", Beyoncé's vocal abilities "outshined it all." Mike Wass of Idolator commented:

Sitting on top of a piano with her band and orchestra watching on, Beyonce wrung every ounce of emotion from the lyrics of '1+1' and hit each note perfectly. It was an impressive display, but her rendition of 'I Care' was even better. [Beyoncé] whipped her hair to the brooding brass and ominous beat, while bringing the song to life with an immaculate vocal. Out of nowhere, this often-overlooked track now seems single-worthy.

The video taken from the DVD Live at Roseland: Elements of 4 was uploaded onto YouTube by Beyoncé's Vevo account on December 21, 2011. It begins with the singer singing the song seated while wearing a sparkly mini dress. Later, the guitarist in her all-female band comes next to her and performs a guitar solo while Beyoncé sings the bridge. Kenneth Partridge of The Boombox praised the performance writing that "the R&B megastar is all growls and snarling glances". He further stated that she looked like "a triumphant rock 'n' roll goddess" while performing "I Care". A writer of The Huffington Post praised the performance writing that "'I Care'... showcases an impressive amount of Beyonce-ness. As she belts the lyrics 'You see these tears falling down to my ears/ I swear you like when I'm in pain/ I try to tell you all my fears/ You still don't care?/ That's okay,' Beyonce bedazzles in a sparkly getup and an impressive amount of hair-whipping." During the ITV special A Night With Beyoncé which aired on December 4 in the United Kingdom, Beyoncé performed "I Care" to a selected crowd of fans.

In May 2012, Beyoncé performed "I Care" during her Revel Presents: Beyoncé Live revue in Revel Atlantic City. Jim Farber of Daily News wrote that "she delivered it with equal parts defiance and need". Dan DeLuca of The Philadelphia Inquirer concluded, "The set list tipped too heavily at times towards bombastic balladry like 'I Care' and 'I Miss You'" Tris McCall of New Jersey On-Line praised the performance of "I Care" during the show writing that she "matched her guitar player’s solo note for note during a scalding version of 'I Care.'" In 2013, "I Care" was part of the set list of The Mrs. Carter Show World Tour where Beyoncé performed it seated on a bar stool wearing a black fedora. The Observer's Kitty Empire felt that the set "dip[ped]" with the performance of "I Care" before adding that "[the song is] reminding you that there is filler, even on Beyoncé albums" It was part of her set list during both of her performances at Coachella, and during The Formation World Tour, it was used as an interlude, in a medley with "Ghost". It was also part of the set list of OTR II after Jay-Z performed a snippet of "4:44". "I Care" was performed during the "Opening Act" of the Renaissance World Tour.

== Chart performance ==
For the week ending July 2, 2011, "I Care" debuted at number 35 on the South Korean International Singles Chart, selling 15,816 digital downloads.

Chart (2011)	Peak position
Portuguese Ringtone Chart	16
South Korea Gaon International Chart	35

== Certifications and sales ==
Region	Certification	Certified units/sales
Brazil (Pro-Música Brasil)	Gold	30,000^{‡}
United States (RIAA)	Gold	500,000^{‡}
^{‡} Sales+streaming figures based on certification alone.

== Release history ==
Country	Date	Format
Italy	March 23, 2012	Contemporary hit radio
