= List of Billboard number-one electronic albums of 2017 =

These are the albums that reached number one on the Billboard Dance/Electronic Albums chart in 2017.

== Chart history ==
Key
†	Indicates best-performing album of 2017

Issue date	Album	Artist	Reference
January 7	Brave Enough	Lindsey Stirling	
January 14	Collage	The Chainsmokers	
January 21	Collage	The Chainsmokers	
January 28	Now That's What I Call a Workout 2017	Various artists	
February 4	Migration	Bonobo	
February 11	Collage	The Chainsmokers	
February 18	Collage	The Chainsmokers	
February 25	The Fame	Lady Gaga	
March 4	Collage	The Chainsmokers	
March 11	Collage	The Chainsmokers	
March 18	Collage	The Chainsmokers	
March 25	Collage	The Chainsmokers	
April 1	Collage	The Chainsmokers	
April 8	Collage	The Chainsmokers	
April 15	Collage	The Chainsmokers	
April 22	Collage	The Chainsmokers	
April 29	Memories...Do Not Open †	The Chainsmokers	
May 6	Memories...Do Not Open †	The Chainsmokers	
May 13	Memories...Do Not Open †	The Chainsmokers	
May 20	Memories...Do Not Open †	The Chainsmokers	
May 27	Memories...Do Not Open †	The Chainsmokers	
June 3	Memories...Do Not Open †	The Chainsmokers	
June 10	Memories...Do Not Open †	The Chainsmokers	
June 17	Memories...Do Not Open †	The Chainsmokers	
June 24	Memories...Do Not Open †	The Chainsmokers	
July 1	Memories...Do Not Open †	The Chainsmokers	
July 8	Memories...Do Not Open †	The Chainsmokers	
July 15	Memories...Do Not Open †	The Chainsmokers	
July 22	Funk Wav Bounces Vol. 1	Calvin Harris	
July 29	Funk Wav Bounces Vol. 1	Calvin Harris	
August 5	Funk Wav Bounces Vol. 1	Calvin Harris	
August 12	Funk Wav Bounces Vol. 1	Calvin Harris	
August 19	Funk Wav Bounces Vol. 1	Calvin Harris	
August 26	Funk Wav Bounces Vol. 1	Calvin Harris	
September 2	Funk Wav Bounces Vol. 1	Calvin Harris	
September 9	Funk Wav Bounces Vol. 1	Calvin Harris	
September 16	Funk Wav Bounces Vol. 1	Calvin Harris	
September 23	Funk Wav Bounces Vol. 1	Calvin Harris	
September 30	A Moment Apart	Odesza	
October 7	Funk Wav Bounces Vol. 1	Calvin Harris	
October 14	Funk Wav Bounces Vol. 1	Calvin Harris	
October 21	Funk Wav Bounces Vol. 1	Calvin Harris	
October 28	Funk Wav Bounces Vol. 1	Calvin Harris	
November 4	Memories...Do Not Open †	The Chainsmokers	
November 11	Funk Wav Bounces Vol. 1	Calvin Harris	
November 18	Funk Wav Bounces Vol. 1	Calvin Harris	
November 25	Kids in Love	Kygo	
December 2	Funk Wav Bounces Vol. 1	Calvin Harris	
December 9	Memories...Do Not Open †	The Chainsmokers	
December 16	Revelations: The White EP	William Control	
December 23	Memories... Do Not Open †	The Chainsmokers	
December 30	Memories... Do Not Open †	The Chainsmokers	
