= Something Just Like This =

2017 song by The Chainsmokers and Coldplay

Single by The Chainsmokers and Coldplay

from the album Memories...Do Not Open and the Kaleidoscope EP
- Released: February 22, 2017
- Recorded: 2016
- Genre: EDM; pop
- Length: 4:07
- Label: Disruptor; Columbia
- Songwriters: Andrew Taggart; Guy Berryman; Jonny Buckland; Will Champion; Chris Martin
- Producer: The Chainsmokers

The Chainsmokers singles chronology
| "Paris" (2017) | "Something Just Like This" (2017) | "Honest" (2017) |

Coldplay singles chronology
| "Everglow" (2016) | "Something Just Like This" (2017) | "Orphans" / "Arabesque" (2019) |

Lyric video
- "Something Just Like This" on YouTube

"Something Just Like This" is a song by American electronic music duo the Chainsmokers and British rock band Coldplay. It was released on February 22, 2017, as the second single from the former's debut album, Memories...Do Not Open, and as the lead single of the latter's thirteenth extended play, Kaleidoscope EP.

The track reached the Top 10 in over 30 countries worldwide, including number two on the UK Singles Chart and the ARIA Charts, as well as number three on the Billboard Hot 100. It has the fifth highest digital sales of any song at over 21.5 million sales. It was also nominated for a Grammy Award for Best Pop Duo/Group Performance at the 60th Annual Grammy Awards. In 2026, the song received a 13× Platinum certification by the RIAA for selling 13 million units in the United States.

== Background ==
In September 2016, the Chainsmokers shared three short clips of an upcoming song featuring vocals from Coldplay frontman Chris Martin. On February 22, 2017, Spotify prematurely posted a banner ad at the top of the site's home page with a Listen Now button.

On the same date, Coldplay premiered "Something Just Like This" with the Chainsmokers on stage at the Brit Awards at the O2 Arena in London, England. They then performed the song at the 2017 iHeartRadio Music Awards at The Forum in Inglewood, California on March 5, 2017 and on their A Head Full of Dreams Tour since the Singapore show on March 31. It was performed again by Coldplay at the One Love Manchester benefit concert for the victims of the Manchester Arena bombing on June 4, 2017.

== Lyric video ==
A lyric video for the song was also released on February 22, 2017, on the Chainsmokers' Vevo channel. As of August 2026, it has received over 2.5 billion views on YouTube. It was directed by James Zwadlo.

== Composition ==
The song is written in the key of B minor and has a tempo of 103 beats per minute in common time. It follows a chord progression of G(add9)–Asus–Bm–Asus, and the vocals span two octaves, from G_{2} to G_{4}.

== Chart performance ==
"Something Just Like This" debuted at number 56 on the Billboard Hot 100 chart dating March 11, 2017. and soared to number five on its second week, giving the duo their fifth and most recent top ten hit as of August 2026. It also gave Coldplay their fourth top ten hit, their first since their other EDM song, "A Sky Full of Stars", reached number ten in May 2014. It was the sixth best-selling track of 2017 in the United States with over 1.34 million copies. "Something Just Like This" would reach its peak of number three on the chart dating April 15, 2017, spent a total of 17 non-consecutive weeks in the top ten, as well as 39 weeks in total on the chart, and would eventually be placed at number five on the Billboard Year-End Hot 100 singles chart for 2017, becoming both artists' highest peak on that chart, and marked the second-consecutive year where the Chainsmokers had two songs that ranked within the top ten with that chart with both "Something Just Like This" and "Closer", the latter of which ranked at number seven (for the 2016 chart, it was "Closer" and "Don't Let Me Down", which both ranked at number ten and number eight respectively).

In the United Kingdom, "Something Just Like This" debuted at number 30 on February 24, 2017, reaching number two in the following week. It spent nine consecutive weeks in the top 10 and became the ninth biggest song of the year in the country. It also set a new record for most weeks atop the Billboard Hot Dance/Electronic Songs chart (79). In 2024, PPL ranked "Something Just Like This" as Coldplay's fourth-most played song on British media. A year later, the track was placed at number 53 on the list of most streamed songs of all time on Apple Music.

== Critical reception ==
Philip Cosores from Consequence named "Something Just Like This" one of the best releases of February 2017, mentioning that "the track is a warm, sentimental, uplifting anthem" where Martin "steals the show, punctuating his verses with enough sap and self-confidence that we remember why we like pop music in the first place". 3voor12 and Uproxx listed it among the best songs of 2017. KROQ-FM placed the single at number 314 on their "Top 500 Songs from the Last 30 Years" ranking.

== Covers ==
In 2018, The Piano Guys released a mashup on piano and cello called "Something Just Like Liszt", combining the song with Franz Liszt's "Hungarian Rhapsody No. 2".

== Track listing ==
Digital download
| No. | Title | Length |
|---|---|---|
| 1. | "Something Just like This" | 4:07 |

Digital download – Remix Pack EP
| No. | Title | Length |
|---|---|---|
| 1. | "Something Just like This" (Alesso Remix) | 4:12 |
| 2. | "Something Just like This" (R3hab Remix) | 2:42 |
| 3. | "Something Just like This" (Dimitri Vegas & Like Mike Remix) | 3:50 |
| 4. | "Something Just like This" (Don Diablo Remix) | 3:50 |
| 5. | "Something Just like This" (Jai Wolf Remix) | 2:56 |
| 6. | "Something Just like This" (ARMNHMR Remix) | 3:44 |

Digital download – Kaleidoscope EP
| No. | Title | Length |
|---|---|---|
| 1. | "Something Just like This" (Tokyo Remix) | 4:33 |

== Credits and personnel ==
The Chainsmokers

- Andrew Taggart – keyboards
- Alex Pall – keyboards

Coldplay

- Guy Berryman – bass guitar
- Jonny Buckland – lead guitar
- Will Champion – drums, backing vocals, programming
- Chris Martin – lead vocals, piano

Production

- The Chainsmokers – production
- DJ Swivel – production

== Charts ==
=== Weekly charts ===
Weekly chart performance
| Chart (2017–2025) | Peak position |
|---|---|
| Argentina Hot 100 (Billboard) | 90 |
| Argentina (Monitor Latino) | 19 |
| Australia (ARIA) | 2 |
| Austria (Ö3 Austria Top 40) | 2 |
| Belarus Airplay (Eurofest) | 9 |
| Belgium (Ultratop 50 Flanders) | 1 |
| Belgium (Ultratop 50 Wallonia) | 2 |
| Brazil (Billboard Hot 100) | 3 |
| Canada Hot 100 (Billboard) | 3 |
| Colombia (National-Report) | 37 |
| Czech Republic Airplay (ČNS IFPI) | 1 |
| Czech Republic Singles Digital (ČNS IFPI) | 2 |
| Denmark (Tracklisten) | 5 |
| Finland (Suomen virallinen lista) | 6 |
| France (SNEP) | 17 |
| Germany (GfK) | 4 |
| Germany Airplay (BVMI) | 1 |
| Germany Dance (Official German Charts) | 2 |
| Global 200 (Billboard) | 82 |
| Hong Kong (Billboard) | 13 |
| Hungary (Rádiós Top 40) | 3 |
| Hungary (Single Top 40) | 5 |
| Hungary (Stream Top 40) | 3 |
| Iceland (RÚV) | 10 |
| Ireland (IRMA) | 3 |
| Italy (FIMI) | 3 |
| Italy Airplay (EarOne) | 1 |
| Japan Hot 100 (Billboard) | 11 |
| Latvia (DigiTop100) | 48 |
| Lebanon Airplay (Lebanese Top 20) | 1 |
| Malaysia (RIM) | 1 |
| Mexico Airplay (Billboard) | 2 |
| Mexico Ingles Airplay (Billboard) | 2 |
| Mexico Streaming (AMPROFON) | 16 |
| Mexico (Monitor Latino) | 3 |
| Netherlands (Dutch Top 40) | 4 |
| Netherlands (Single Top 100) | 6 |
| New Zealand (Recorded Music NZ) | 5 |
| Norway (VG-lista) | 5 |
| Paraguay (Monitor Latino) | 9 |
| Philippines (Philippine Hot 100) | 6 |
| Poland Airplay (ZPAV) | 1 |
| Portugal (AFP) | 3 |
| Romania Airplay (Media Forest) | 2 |
| Russia Airplay (Tophit) | 6 |
| Singapore (RIAS) | 7 |
| Slovakia Airplay (ČNS IFPI) | 1 |
| Slovakia Singles Digital (ČNS IFPI) | 3 |
| Slovenia (SloTop50) | 5 |
| South Korea (Gaon) | 39 |
| South Korea International (Gaon) | 2 |
| Spain (Promusicae) | 6 |
| Sweden (Sverigetopplistan) | 4 |
| Switzerland (Schweizer Hitparade) | 3 |
| Taiwan (Billboard) | 7 |
| UK Singles (Official Charts) | 2 |
| UK Dance (Official Charts) | 1 |
| Ukraine Airplay (Tophit) | 29 |
| United Arab Emirates (IFPI) | 10 |
| US Billboard Hot 100 | 3 |
| US Adult Contemporary (Billboard) | 1 |
| US Adult Pop Airplay (Billboard) | 1 |
| US Dance Airplay (Billboard) | 1 |
| US Dance Club Songs (Billboard) | 9 |
| US Hot Dance/Electronic Songs (Billboard) | 1 |
| US Pop Airplay (Billboard) | 1 |
| US Rhythmic Airplay (Billboard) | 24 |
| US Rock & Alternative Airplay (Billboard) | 8 |

=== Monthly charts ===
Monthly chart performance
| Chart (2017) | Peak position |
|---|---|
| South Korea (Gaon) | 47 |
| South Korea International (Gaon) | 2 |

=== Year-end charts ===
Year-end chart performance
| Chart (2017) | Position |
|---|---|
| Argentina (Monitor Latino) | 52 |
| Australia (ARIA) | 5 |
| Austria (Ö3 Austria Top 40) | 4 |
| Belgium (Ultratop Flanders) | 3 |
| Belgium (Ultratop Wallonia) | 3 |
| Brazil (Pro-Música Brasil) | 30 |
| Canada (Canadian Hot 100) | 4 |
| Croatia International Airplay (Top lista) | 6 |
| Denmark (Tracklisten) | 24 |
| France (SNEP) | 29 |
| Germany (Official German Charts) | 3 |
| Hungary (Rádiós Top 40) | 19 |
| Hungary (Single Top 40) | 12 |
| Hungary (Stream Top 40) | 8 |
| Iceland (Tónlistinn) | 16 |
| Italy (FIMI) | 4 |
| Italy Airplay (EarOne) | 3 |
| Japan (Japan Hot 100) | 51 |
| Latvia Airplay (LaIPA) | 2 |
| Netherlands (Dutch Top 40) | 16 |
| Netherlands (Single Top 100) | 9 |
| New Zealand (Recorded Music NZ) | 8 |
| Norway (VG-lista) | 7 |
| Poland (ZPAV) | 6 |
| Portugal (AFP) | 4 |
| Russia Airplay (Tophit) | 22 |
| Slovenia (SloTop50) | 9 |
| South Korea (Gaon) | 76 |
| South Korea International (Gaon) | 4 |
| Spain (PROMUSICAE) | 32 |
| Sweden (Sverigetopplistan) | 3 |
| Switzerland (Schweizer Hitparade) | 3 |
| UK Singles (OCC) | 9 |
| US Billboard Hot 100 | 5 |
| US Adult Contemporary (Billboard) | 10 |
| US Adult Top 40 (Billboard) | 2 |
| US Hot Dance/Electronic Songs (Billboard) | 1 |
| US Mainstream Top 40 (Billboard) | 11 |
| US Rock Airplay (Billboard) | 19 |
| Worldwide (IFPI) | 3 |

| Chart (2018) | Position |
|---|---|
| Hungary (Rádiós Top 40) | 19 |
| Portugal (AFP) | 130 |
| Romania (Airplay 100) | 99 |
| South Korea International (Gaon) | 9 |
| US Adult Contemporary (Billboard) | 11 |
| US Hot Dance/Electronic Songs (Billboard) | 3 |
| Worldwide (IFPI) | 8 |

| Chart (2019) | Position |
|---|---|
| South Korea (Gaon) | 196 |

| Chart (2021) | Position |
|---|---|
| Global 200 (Billboard) | 134 |

| Chart (2022) | Position |
|---|---|
| Global 200 (Billboard) | 92 |

| Chart (2023) | Position |
|---|---|
| Global 200 (Billboard) | 158 |

| Chart (2024) | Position |
|---|---|
| Australia (ARIA) | 91 |
| Global 200 (Billboard) | 117 |

| Chart (2025) | Position |
|---|---|
| Global 200 (Billboard) | 82 |

=== Decade-end charts ===
Decade-end chart performance
| Chart (2010–2019) | Position |
|---|---|
| Australia (ARIA) | 71 |
| Austria (Ö3 Austria Top 40) | 48 |
| Germany (Official German Charts) | 45 |
| UK Singles (OCC) | 72 |
| US Hot Dance/Electronic Songs (Billboard) | 2 |

== Certifications and sales ==
Certifications and sales
| Region | Certification | Certified units/sales |
|---|---|---|
| Australia (ARIA) | 17× Platinum | 1,190,000^{‡} |
| Austria (IFPI Austria) | Platinum | 30,000^{‡} |
| Belgium (BRMA) | 3× Platinum | 60,000^{‡} |
| Brazil (Pro-Música Brasil) | 3× Diamond | 750,000^{‡} |
| Canada (Music Canada) | Diamond | 800,000^{‡} |
| Denmark (IFPI Danmark) | 3× Platinum | 270,000^{‡} |
| France (SNEP) | Diamond | 233,333^{‡} |
| Germany (BVMI) | 3× Platinum | 1,200,000^{‡} |
| Italy (FIMI) | 7× Platinum | 350,000^{‡} |
| Mexico (AMPROFON) | 3× Diamond+Platinum | 960,000^{‡} |
| New Zealand (RMNZ) | 9× Platinum | 270,000^{‡} |
| Norway (IFPI Norway) | 3× Platinum | 180,000^{‡} |
| Poland (ZPAV) | Diamond | 250,000^{‡} |
| Portugal (AFP) | 6× Platinum | 60,000^{‡} |
| Singapore (RIAS) | Platinum | 10,000^{*} |
| South Korea (KMCA) | Platinum | 2,500,000^{*} |
| Spain (Promusicae) | 5× Platinum | 300,000^{‡} |
| Switzerland (IFPI Switzerland) | 4× Platinum | 80,000^{‡} |
| United Kingdom (BPI) | 6× Platinum | 3,600,000^{‡} |
| United States (RIAA) | 13× Platinum | 13,000,000^{‡} |
Streaming
| Greece (IFPI Greece) | Platinum | 2,000,000^{†} |
| Japan (RIAJ) | Platinum | 100,000,000^{†} |
| Sweden (GLF) | 9× Platinum | 72,000,000^{†} |
Summaries
| Worldwide (IFPI) | — | 21,500,000 (Note: Global year-end sales for "Something Just Like This" in 2017 and 2018.) |
^{*} Sales figures based on certification alone.^{‡} Sales+streaming figures based on certification alone.^{†} Streaming-only figures based on certification alone.

== Release history ==
Release dates and formats
| Region | Date | Format | Version | Label | Ref. |
|---|---|---|---|---|---|
| Various | February 22, 2017 | Digital download | Original | Disruptor · Columbia | |
| Italy | February 22, 2017 | Contemporary hit radio | Original | Sony | |
| United States | February 28, 2017 | Contemporary hit radio | Original | Columbia | |
| United Kingdom | April 25, 2017 | Contemporary hit radio | Original | Disruptor · Columbia | |
| United States | April 28, 2017 | Digital download | Remix pack | Disruptor · Columbia | |

== See also ==
- List of best-selling singles
- List of best-selling singles in Brazil
- List of best-selling singles in Canada
- List of best-selling singles in Germany
- List of best-selling singles in Mexico
- List of best-selling singles in Spain
- List of highest-certified digital singles in the United States
- List of highest-certified singles in Australia
- List of number-one singles of 2017 (Belgium)
- List of number-one songs of 2017 (Malaysia)
- List of Billboard Hot 100 top-ten singles in 2017
- List of top 10 singles for 2017 in Australia
- List of top 10 singles in 2017 (France)
- List of top 10 singles in 2017 (Germany)
- List of UK top-ten singles in 2017
- List of number-one songs of the 2020s (Czech Republic)
- List of number-one songs of the 2010s (Slovakia)
