= Ahmad Bazzi =

Lebanese Inventor and Researcher

- Citizenship: Lebanese, French
- Education: Eurecom, CentraleSupelec
- Scientific career
- Fields: Electrical engineering, computer science
- Workplaces: New York University Abu Dhabi
- Thesis: Parameter Estimation Techniques for Indoor Localisation via WiFi (2017)
- Doctoral advisor: Dirk Slock

Ahmad Bazzi is a French-Lebanese research scientist at NYU WIRELESS, New York University Tandon School of Engineering and New York University Abu Dhabi. He is an inventor of different patents in the field of wireless communications, and more specifically in Bluetooth technologies. The patent is in market as it doubles the range of Bluetooth Low Energy devices and reduce power consumption by 90 percent. Ahmad Bazzi has co-authored research on integrated sensing and communications (ISAC), including work on reconstructing three-dimensional point clouds from wireless channel state information.

In addition to his research, Bazzi is an educator on YouTube, where he publishes engineering and programming topics for a global audience.
