= Gian Bazzi =

Swiss ice hockey player

- Born: 3 April 1931; Davos, Switzerland
- Died: 7 January 2016 (aged 84); Bern, Switzerland
- Position: Left Wing
- National team: Switzerland
- Playing career: 1951–1963

Gian Bazzi (3 April 1931 – 7 January 2016) was a Swiss ice hockey player who competed for the Swiss national team at the 1952 Winter Olympics.
