= DJ Swivel =

- Also known as: DJ Swivel, Swivel
- Born: Jordan Young; 14 December 1984 (age 41); Toronto, Ontario, Canada
- Origin: Toronto, Ontario, Canada
- Genres: Pop, EDM, hip hop, R&B
- Occupations: Record producer, songwriter, audio engineer, DJ, software developer
- Years active: 2005–present
- Website: djswivel.com

Jordan Young (born 14 December 1984), known professionally as DJ Swivel, is a Canadian record producer, mixer, audio engineer, songwriter, and software developer. He won a Grammy Award for Best Dance Recording at the 59th Annual Grammy Awards for mixing "Don't Let Me Down" by The Chainsmokers. His work with The Chainsmokers yielded three RIAA Diamond certifications ("Closer", "Something Just Like This", "Don't Let Me Down").

In 2011, Young served as vocal engineer on Beyoncé's album 4. He was awarded "Secret Genius: Dance" by Spotify in 2018. He is also the founder of Hooky, an AI voice technology platform, and has developed a line of audio software plugins.

Starting his career in New York City in 2005 under Ken "Duro" Ifill, he has worked with artists including Rema, BTS, Beyoncé, Lil Nas X, The Chainsmokers, Dua Lipa, Coldplay, Rihanna, Jay-Z, Cordae, Gryffin, Fabolous, Rick Ross, Jay Sean, Britney Spears, Sean Combs, Wyclef Jean, Rita Ora, Mary J. Blige, Tiësto, and Whitney Houston.

== Early life and education ==
Young was born in Toronto, Ontario, Canada. His mother is Christine Bentley, former news anchor for the Toronto television station CFTO. He graduated from Full Sail University's Recording Arts program in 2005.

== Career ==
=== Early career (2005–2010) ===
After graduating from Full Sail, Young moved to New York City, where he began working under Ken "Duro" Ifill at Desert Storm Records. During this period, he served as a mixing assistant and engineer on projects for Jay-Z, Fabolous, Mary J. Blige, Kanye West, Rick Ross, Britney Spears, Mariah Carey, and others.

=== Beyoncé and The Chainsmokers (2011–2018) ===
In 2011, Young served as vocal engineer on all tracks of Beyoncé's 4 and also mixed "I Care" and "Schoolin' Life". He continued working with Beyoncé on Live at Roseland: Elements of 4 (2011) and as an engineer on "Flawless" from her self-titled album (2013).

In 2013, Young was credited as an engineer on "Love on Top" by Beyoncé, which won the Grammy Award for Best Traditional R&B Performance.

In 2015, Young co-founded the music technology startup SKIO Music. That same year, he began working with The Chainsmokers, mixing their Bouquet EP and the single "Roses".

He was inducted into the Full Sail University Hall of Fame as part of the class of 2015.

His collaboration with The Chainsmokers expanded to include mixing, production, and engineering on "Closer" (2016), "Don't Let Me Down" (2016), "Something Just Like This" (2017, with Coldplay), "Paris" (2017), the Collage EP (2016), and the album Memories...Do Not Open (2017).

Young won the Grammy Award for Best Dance Recording at the 59th Annual Grammy Awards in 2017 for mixing "Don't Let Me Down".

From 2018 to 2020, Young served as mixer, engineer, producer, and co-writer for BTS on tracks including "Euphoria", "Magic Shop", "Love Maze", "So What", "Mikrokosmos", "Moon", and "We Are Bulletproof: The Eternal".

=== Software development (2020–present) ===
In January 2020, Young released The Sauce, an effects processor plugin for vocals. Later in 2020, he released Spread, a plugin for converting mono tracks to stereo. He subsequently released additional plugins including Knocktonal, a drum resonance tuning tool, and HitStrip, a channel strip plugin comprising nine processing modules, released in November 2024 after three years of development.

His plugin line, which also includes BDE and Click Boom, was rebranded as Swivel Audio and distributed through Plugin Alliance beginning in August 2025.

Young also owns a music publishing company, Waves With Words, in partnership with Concord.

=== Hooky and AI voice technology (2023–present) ===
Young founded Hooky, an AI voice technology platform that provides licensed artist voice models for use in music production.

In November 2023, singer Lauv used Hooky's AI voice modelling technology to release a Korean-language version of his single "Love U Like That". The process involved Korean singer Kevin Woo (formerly of U-KISS) performing the Korean vocals, after which Hooky's AI applied Lauv's vocal characteristics to the recording. The release was described by Billboard as the first instance of a major Western artist using AI voice modelling to release a song in a new language.

In April 2024, Young was quoted by CBC News in coverage of broader music industry concerns about AI, comparing the challenges to the Napster-era disputes over digital file-sharing.

Hooky launched as a subscription platform on 5 June 2024, with initial voice models from artists including Jay Sean, Eric Bellinger, and Bonnie X Clyde.

=== Television ===
In 2023, Young served as a judge on Banded: The Musician Competition, a music competition series on AXS TV that premiered on 13 May 2023. The show, hosted by Brandon Jenner and co-hosted by Didi Benami, placed 25 individual songwriters into five multi-genre bands.

== Selected discography (mixing, production, engineer, writer) ==
Year	Artist	Title(s)	Album	Role	Certification(s)
2025	Ozuna	"Sirenita"	Single	Mixing	
2025	Lil Nas X	"Need Dat Boy"	Single	Mixing	
2024	Beyoncé	"Ya Ya"	Cowboy Carter	Vocal Recording	
2024	Mazzel	"Parade"	Single	Mixing	
2024	Le Sserafim	"Smart"	Easy	Mixing	
2024	Bazzi	"Eyes"	Single	Mixing	
2022	Rema	"Calm Down" (with Selena Gomez)	Single	Mixing, Mastering	US: 7× Platinum
2022	Rema	All songs	Rave & Roses	Mixing, Mastering	
2021	Kane Brown (w/ H.E.R)	"Blessed and Free"	Single	Mixing	
2021	Lil Nas X	"Montero (Call Me By Your Name) - But Lil Nas X Makes All The Sounds With His Mouth"	EP Version	Mixing	
2020	Twice	All songs	Eyes Wide Open	Mixing	
2020	WayV	All songs	Awaken the World	Mixing	
2020	BTS	"Moon", "We Are Bulletproof: The Eternal"	Map of the Soul: 7	Mixer, Production, Engineer, Writer.	US: Platinum
2020	Dua Lipa	"Good In Bed"	Future Nostalgia	Mixing	US: Platinum
2019	Cordae	"Wassup" (with Young Thug)	Single	Mixing	
2019	Gryffin	All songs	Gravity	Mixing	
2019	TXT	All songs	The Dream Chapter: Magic	Mixing	
2019	Lil Nas X	"Panini"	7 EP	Mixing	US: 7× Platinum
2019	Lil Nas X	"Rodeo" (with Cardi B)	7 EP	Mixing	US: 2× Platinum
2019	Lil Nas X	"Holiday"	Single	Mixing	US: 2× Platinum
2019	BTS	"Mikrokosmos"	Map of the Soul: Persona	Mixing, Engineer, Writer.	US: Gold
2018	BTS	"Love Maze", "So What"	Love Yourself: Tear	Mixing, Engineer, Writer	
2018	BTS	"Euphoria", "I'm Fine", "Answer: Love Myself", "Magic Shop", "Best of Me"	Love Yourself: Answer	Mixing, Production, Engineer, Writer	US: Platinum
2017	The Chainsmokers	Tracks 1–11	Memories ... Do Not Open	Mixing, Production, Engineer.	US: Platinum
2017	The Chainsmokers	"Something Just Like This" (with Coldplay)	Single	Mixing, Production, Engineer.	US: 10× Platinum
2017	The Chainsmokers	"Paris"	Single	Mixing, Production, Engineer.	US: 4× Platinum
2017	Coldplay	"Miracles" (with Big Sean)	Kaleidoscope EP	Mixing, Mastering	
2017	Dua Lipa	"Homesick" (with Chris Martin)	Dua Lipa	Mixing, Mastering	US: Platinum
2016	The Chainsmokers	All songs	Collage EP	Mixing, Production, Engineer.	US: 2× Platinum
2016	The Chainsmokers	"Closer"	Single	Mixing, Production, Engineer.	US: 15× Platinum
2016	The Chainsmokers	"Don't Let Me Down" (with Daya)	Single	Mixing	US: 10× Platinum
2015	The Chainsmokers	"Roses"	Single	Mixing	US: 6× Platinum
2015	The Chainsmokers	All songs	Bouquet EP	Mixing	US: Gold

== Extended discography (mixing, engineer, assistant) ==
Year	Artist	Title	Album	Role	Certification
2015	Raury	"Superfly", "Armor", "Cigarette Song", "Chariots of Fire"	Indigo Child	Mixing	
2014	Fabolous	"We Good" (with Rich Homie Quan), "You Made Me" (with Tish Hyman), "She Wildin" (with Chris Brown), "Ball Drop" (with French Montana), "Rap & Sex", "Cinnamon Apple" (with Kevin Hart)	The Young OG Project	Engineer	
2014	Jay Sean	Tracks 1–6, "Jameson"	The Mistress II	Engineer, Mixing	
2013	Beyoncé	"Flawless"	Beyoncé	Engineer	US: 5× Platinum
2013	Jay-Z	"Oceans" (with Frank Ocean), "BBC", "Nickels and Dimes"	Magna Carta...Holy Grail	Engineer, Editing	US: 2× Platinum
2013	Jay Sean	"Universe"	Neon	Engineer, Mixing	
2012	Rita Ora	"Roc The Life"	Ora	Engineer	
2012	Monica	"Daddy's Girl", "Take a Chance" (with Wale)	New Life	Engineer	
2011	The Dream	"Long Gone"	1977	Engineer	
2011	Beyoncé	All songs.	Live at Roseland: Elements of 4	Engineer	US: Platinum
2011	Rihanna	"Talk That Talk" (with Jay-Z)	Talk That Talk	Engineer	US: 3× Platinum
2011	Mary J. Blige	"Love a Woman" (with Beyoncé)	My Life II...The Journey Continues (Act 1)	Engineer	US: Gold
2011	Wale	"Sabotage" (with Lloyd), "Slight Work" (with Big Sean)	Ambition	Engineer	US: Platinum
2011	Beyoncé	Engineer, all songs. Mix: "I Care", "Schoolin' Life"	4	Mixing, Engineer, Drum Programming, Keyboards	US: 4× Platinum
2011	Fabolous	"Slow Down" (with Trey Songz)	The S.O.U.L Tape	Producer, Engineer, Mixing	
2010	Beyoncé	All songs.	I Am... World Tour	Engineer, Mixing	
2010	Kanye West	"All Of The Lights"	Single	Engineer	US: 5× Platinum
2010	Fabolous	"You Be Killin' Em", "Lights Out"	There Is No Competition 2: The Grieving Music EP	Engineer	
2010	Big Time Rush	"Nothing Even Matters"	BTR	Engineer	
2010	Rick Ross	"Free Mason" (with Jay-Z & John Legend)	Teflon Don	Engineer	US: Gold
2009	Mary J. Blige	"Each Tear" (with Jay Sean)	Stronger With Each Tear	Engineer	US: Gold
2009	Tiësto	"Kaleidoscope" (with Jónsi), "I Will Be Here", "It's Not The Things You Say" (with Kele Okereke), "Who Wants To Be Alone" (with Nelly Furtado), "Knock You Out" (with Emily Haines)	Kaleidoscope	Engineer, Mixing	
2009	Jay Sean	"Do You Remember"	Single	Mixing	US: 2× Platinum
2009	Jay Sean	"Down"	Single	Mixing	US: 6× Platinum
2009	Ghostface Killah	"Not Your Average Girl" (with Shareefa), "Do Over" (with Raheem DeVaughan), "Baby" (with Raheem DeVaughn), "Paragraphs of Love" (with Vaughn Anthony & Estelle), "Guest House" (with Fabolous), "Let's Stop Playin" (with John Legend), "I'll Be That" (with Adrienne Bailon)	Ghostdini: The Wizard of Poetry in Emerald City	Engineer	
2009	Jay-Z	"Empire State of Mind" (with Alicia Keys)	The Blueprint 3	Mixing Assistant	US: 3× Platinum
2009	Fabolous	"The Way", "Mixing My Time" (with Jeremih), "Imma Do It" (with Kob), "Feel Like I'm Back", "Everything, Everyday, Everywhere" (with Keri Hilson), "Throw It In The Bag" (with The Dream), "Money Goes Honey Stay" (with Jay-Z), "Salute" (with Lil Wayne), "There He Go", "The Fabolous Life" (with Ryan Leslie), "Makin Love" (with Ne-Yo), "Last Time" (with Trey Songz), "Pachanga", "Lullaby", "Stay", "Miss My Love"	Loso's Way	Engineer, Mixing	US: Gold
2009	Whitney Houston	"Worth It"	I Look To You	Engineer	US: Platinum
2009	Ryan Leslie	All songs	Ryan Leslie	Assistant Engineer	
2009	Ghostface Killah	All songs	GhostDeini The Great	Assistant Engineer	
2008	Jamie Foxx	"You Should Talk" (with Ne-Yo & Fabolous)	Intuition	Mixing, Engineer	US: Platinum
2008	T.I	"Swing Ya Rag" (with Swizz Beatz)	Paper Trail	Mixing Assistant	US: 2× Platinum
2008	DJ Khaled	All songs	We Global	Mixing Assistant	
2008	Nelly	All songs	Brass Knuckles	Mixing Assistant	US: Gold
2008	Ne-Yo	"She Got Her Own" (with Fabolous & Jamie Foxx)	Year of the Gentleman	Engineer	US: Platinum
2008	Ashanti	All songs	The Declaration	Mixing Assistant	
2008	Jay Sean	"Tonight", "Good Enough", "Murder", "I'm Gone"	My Own Way	Mixing	
2008	Lil Mama	All songs	YVP (Voice of the Young People)	Mixing Assistant	
2008	Mariah Carey	"O.O.C"	E=MC²	Mixing Assistant	US: Platinum
2008	Mary J. Blige	All songs	Growing Pains	Mixing Assistant	US: Platinum
2007	Beanie Sigel	All songs	The Solution	Mixing Assistant	
2007	Jay-Z	"I Know", "Blue Magic"	American Gangster	Engineer	US: Platinum
2007	Britney Spears	"Why Should I Be Sad"	Blackout	Engineer, Mixing Assistant	US: Platinum
2007	Sugababes	"Change"	Change	Engineer	
2007	Yung Joc	All songs	Hustlenomics	Mixing Assistant	
2007	Fabolous	"From Nothin' To Somethin' Intro", "Yep, I'm Back", "Change Up" (with Akon), "Make Me Better" (with Ne-Yo), "Baby Don't Go" (with T-Pain), "Return Of The Hustle" (with Swizz Beatz), "Gangsta Don't Play" (with Junior Reid), "Real Playa Like" (with Lloyd), "First Time" (with Rihanna), "Diamonds" (with Young Jeezy), "Brooklyn" (with Jay-Z & Uncle Murda), "I'm The Man" (with Red Cafe), "Jokes On You" (with Pusha T), "What Should I Do" (with Lil' Mo), "This Is Family", "Supa"	From Nothin' To Somethin'	Engineer, Mixing	US: Gold
2007	Redman	All songs	Red Gone Wild	Mixing Assistant	
2006	Bow Wow	"Shake It" (with Swizz Beatz)	The Price of Fame	Engineer, Mixing Assistant	US: Gold
2006	DJ Clue	All songs	The Professional Part. 3	Engineer, Mixing Assistant	
2006	Diddy	"The Future", "Hold Up", "Wanna Move" (with Big Boi, Ciara, Scar), "Special Feeling", "After Love" (with Keri Hilson), "Through The Pain" (with Mario Winans)	Press Play	Mixing Assistant	US: Gold
2006	Method Man	All songs	4:21...The Day After	Mixing Assistant	
2006	Ice Cube	All songs	Laugh Now Cry Later	Mixing Assistant	US: Gold
