= Paris (The Chainsmokers song) =

Single by the Chainsmokers

from the album Memories...Do Not Open
- Released: January 13, 2017
- Recorded: 2016
- Genre: EDM; pop; synth-pop
- Length: 3:41
- Label: Disruptor; Columbia
- Songwriters: Andrew Taggart; Kristoffer Eriksson; Fredrik Häggstam; Charlee Nyman
- Producer: The Chainsmokers

The Chainsmokers singles chronology
| "Setting Fires" (2016) | "Paris" (2017) | "Something Just Like This" (2017) |

Emily Warren singles chronology
| "Hurt by You" (2017) | "Paris" (2017) | "Something to Hold on To" (2017) |

Music video
- "Paris" on YouTube

"Paris" is a song by American electronic music duo the Chainsmokers, featuring uncredited vocals from American singer-songwriter and frequent collaborator Emily Warren. "Paris" was released on January 13, 2017, as the lead single from their debut album, Memories...Do Not Open, through Disruptor Records and Columbia Records. It was served to Top 40 radio on January 17, 2017, as the follow-up radio single to "Closer".

It reached the top 10 on the US Billboard Hot 100. The single became the duo's fourth number one on the Billboard Dance/Mix Show Airplay chart in its issue dated February 25, 2017, and their fifth number one on the magazine's Dance/Electronic Songs chart in its issue dated March 11, 2017.

== Background ==
In an interview with Billboard's Taylor Weatherby, Warren said about the collaboration:

The Chainsmokers happened to be in New York and I was working on some stuff at a studio nearby, and they were like, 'Can you please come? We're finishing this song. It needs a little something; we don't know what it is. Can you just come sing some background or something?' So I came in and just layered some of Drew's parts and sang those different parts that you can hear on the song. They were like, 'All right, sick, the song's done now.' It was awesome. They just put me in the booth and were like, 'Do whatever you want,' and it turned out how it did."

She was also asked about why she wasn't credited on the song, to which she replied,

"I think that their reasoning was that they wanted it to be a Chainsmokers thing and not featuring anyone. Drew did most of the singing and is doing a lot more singing now. And since it's not a proper duet, the vocal is meant to be more of an effect than an actual part. And there's other stuff I'm doing with them that I'm singing on, so I think in terms of what's coming out, they didn't want to do a lot of features.

== Critical reception ==
Nolan Feeney of Entertainment Weekly gave it a B rating, saying "The track itself makes similar alterations to the band's sound without straying too far from the formula: You'll find the familiar chilled-out keyboards of 'Closer', a guitar loop like the one in 'Don't Let Me Down', and more lyrics about nostalgia and youth and living wild and free, but there's no real drop, and the synths that kick in at the end are relatively subtle. On paper, that all sounds like a bid to showcase some stripped-down musicianship, and The Chainsmokers have certainly earned the right to do so: anyone who thinks they're just DJs who twist knobs just hasn't been paying attention. But in the end, 'Paris' feels like the demo of a song that wants to take more risks than it actually does."

Idolator's Carl Williott claimed "it's a subdued piece of EDM-pop, relying more on guitars than synths, but it's still that signature 'smokers MOR sound", and also stated "the song is about Paris, but the visual takes place on a beach with a supermodel because nothing makes sense in 2017."

Raisa Bruner of Time labeled it "a less-than-encouraging reflection on yet another tricky relationship" and went on to say "this seems to be The Chainsmokers' sweet spot: slow-burning tunes—this one is especially down-tempo—with tropical house undercurrents, a little bit of nostalgic story, and an emotionally ambiguous core."

USA Today's Patrick Ryan stated, "the low-key banger is a nostalgic ode to the City of Lights, painting a schmaltzy picture of millennial romance that's marked by cigarette drags and disheveled hotel rooms."

== Chart performance ==
"Paris" debuted on the US Billboard Hot 100 at number seven. In its second week, the song dropped to number 11 but it bounced back to the top 10 in its February 25, 2017, issue. The song peaked at number six on the US Billboard Hot 100, becoming the duo's fourth top 10 entry. On the Canadian Hot 100 it debuted at number two behind Ed Sheeran's "Shape of You".

== Music video ==
A lyric video for "Paris" was released on January 12, 2017. It was edited and directed by Rory Kramer and shows an unknown man who is holding the camera filming the journey through a tropical country together with a young woman who is played by Alexis Ren.

The official music video for "Paris" was released on February 16, 2017. It features the duo (Drew Taggart and Alex Pall) walking, intercut with shots of them and American model Martha Hunt, who stars in the video, in a house that begins floating and rising up into the sky, with the duo watching from the ground. Towards the end of the show, Hunt slides out of the window of the floating house and somehow falls back down into the same house from which she fell.

== Usage in media ==
The song is also used as a background music for the Renault Samsung SM6 commercial for the South Korean market.

== Live performance ==
On March 5, 2017, The Chainsmokers performed "Paris" at the iHeartRadio Music Awards at The Forum in Inglewood, California, which was then followed by a performance of "Something Just Like This" featuring Chris Martin from Coldplay. The song was also performed during The Chainsmokers' appearance on Saturday Night Live as musical guest on April 8, 2017.

== Track listing ==
Digital download
| No. | Title | Length |
|---|---|---|
| 1. | "Paris" | 3:41 |

Digital download – remixes EP
| No. | Title | Length |
|---|---|---|
| 1. | "Paris" (VINAI Remix) | 3:38 |
| 2. | "Paris" (LOUDPVCK Remix) | 3:51 |
| 3. | "Paris" (Pegboard Nerds Remix) | 2:54 |
| 4. | "Paris" (Jewelz & Sparks Remix) | 3:34 |
| 5. | "Paris" (Party Thieves Remix) | 2:56 |
| 6. | "Paris" (FKYA Remix) | 3:15 |

== Charts ==
=== Weekly charts ===
| Chart (2017) | Peak position |
|---|---|
| Argentina Anglo (Monitor Latino) | 14 |
| Australia (ARIA) | 4 |
| Australia Dance (ARIA) | 1 |
| Austria (Ö3 Austria Top 40) | 6 |
| Belgium (Ultratop 50 Flanders) | 5 |
| Belgium (Ultratop 50 Wallonia) | 13 |
| Canada Hot 100 (Billboard) | 2 |
| Canada CHR/Top 40 (Billboard) | 2 |
| Canada Hot AC (Billboard) | 14 |
| Colombia (National-Report) | 50 |
| Czech Republic Airplay (ČNS IFPI) | 59 |
| Czech Republic Singles Digital (ČNS IFPI) | 3 |
| Denmark (Tracklisten) | 2 |
| Finland (Suomen virallinen lista) | 5 |
| France (SNEP) | 29 |
| Germany (GfK) | 3 |
| Germany Dance (Official German Charts) | 1 |
| Hungary (Rádiós Top 40) | 19 |
| Hungary (Single Top 40) | 24 |
| Ireland (IRMA) | 3 |
| Italy (FIMI) | 9 |
| Japan Hot 100 (Billboard) | 34 |
| Lebanon (Lebanese Top 20) | 6 |
| Malaysia (RIM) | 2 |
| Mexico Airplay (Billboard) | 2 |
| Netherlands (Dutch Top 40) | 4 |
| Netherlands (Single Top 100) | 4 |
| New Zealand (Recorded Music NZ) | 5 |
| Norway (VG-lista) | 3 |
| Philippines (Philippine Hot 100) | 36 |
| Portugal (AFP) | 4 |
| Russia Airplay (Tophit) | 36 |
| Scottish Singles Sales (Official Charts) | 6 |
| Slovakia Airplay (ČNS IFPI) | 35 |
| Slovakia Singles Digital (ČNS IFPI) | 4 |
| Slovenia (SloTop50) | 8 |
| Spain (Promusicae) | 13 |
| Sweden (Sverigetopplistan) | 2 |
| Switzerland (Schweizer Hitparade) | 8 |
| UK Singles (Official Charts) | 5 |
| US Billboard Hot 100 | 6 |
| US Adult Pop Airplay (Billboard) | 16 |
| US Dance Airplay (Billboard) | 1 |
| US Dance Club Songs (Billboard) | 11 |
| US Hot Dance/Electronic Songs (Billboard) | 1 |
| US Pop Airplay (Billboard) | 3 |
| US Rhythmic Airplay (Billboard) | 15 |

=== Year-end charts ===
| Chart (2017) | Position |
|---|---|
| Australia (ARIA) | 31 |
| Australia Dance (ARIA) | 6 |
| Austria (Ö3 Austria Top 40) | 32 |
| Belgium (Ultratop Flanders) | 54 |
| Brazil (Pro-Música Brasil) | 111 |
| Canada (Canadian Hot 100) | 26 |
| Denmark (Tracklisten) | 27 |
| France (SNEP) | 143 |
| Germany (Official German Charts) | 38 |
| Hungary (Stream Top 40) | 26 |
| Italy (FIMI) | 33 |
| Latvia Airplay (LaIPA) | 27 |
| Netherlands (Dutch Top 40) | 35 |
| Netherlands (Single Top 100) | 36 |
| Portugal (AFP) | 27 |
| Spain (Promusicae) | 71 |
| Sweden (Sverigetopplistan) | 30 |
| Switzerland (Schweizer Hitparade) | 45 |
| UK Singles (Official Charts Company) | 32 |
| US Billboard Hot 100 | 42 |
| US Hot Dance/Electronic Songs (Billboard) | 7 |
| US Mainstream Top 40 (Billboard) | 20 |

== Certifications ==
| Region | Certification | Certified units/sales |
|---|---|---|
| Australia (ARIA) | 4× Platinum | 280,000^{‡} |
| Austria (IFPI Austria) | Gold | 15,000^{‡} |
| Belgium (BRMA) | Platinum | 20,000^{‡} |
| Brazil (Pro-Música Brasil) | Diamond | 250,000^{‡} |
| Canada (Music Canada) | 7× Platinum | 560,000^{‡} |
| Denmark (IFPI Danmark) | 2× Platinum | 180,000^{‡} |
| France (SNEP) | Platinum | 133,333^{‡} |
| Germany (BVMI) | 3× Gold | 600,000^{‡} |
| Italy (FIMI) | 3× Platinum | 150,000^{‡} |
| Mexico (AMPROFON) | Diamond | 300,000^{‡} |
| Netherlands (NVPI) | Gold | 20,000^{‡} |
| New Zealand (RMNZ) | 3× Platinum | 90,000^{‡} |
| Norway (IFPI Norway) | 2× Platinum | 120,000^{‡} |
| Poland (ZPAV) | Platinum | 50,000^{‡} |
| Portugal (AFP) | Platinum | 10,000^{‡} |
| Spain (Promusicae) | Platinum | 40,000^{‡} |
| Switzerland (IFPI Switzerland) | Gold | 10,000^{‡} |
| United Kingdom (BPI) | 2× Platinum | 1,200,000^{‡} |
| United States (RIAA) | 5× Platinum | 5,000,000^{‡} |
Streaming
| Sweden (GLF) | 5× Platinum | 40,000,000^{†} |
^{‡} Sales+streaming figures based on certification alone.^{†} Streaming-only figures based on certification alone.

== Release history ==
| Region | Date | Format | Version | Label | Ref. |
|---|---|---|---|---|---|
| Various | January 13, 2017 | Digital download | Original | Disruptor; Columbia | |
| United Kingdom | January 13, 2017 | Contemporary hit radio | Original | Disruptor; Columbia | |
| United States | January 16, 2017 | Hot AC radio | Original | Disruptor; Columbia | |
| United States | January 17, 2017 | Top 40 radio | Original | Disruptor; Columbia | |
| United States | January 17, 2017 | Rhythmic radio | Original | Disruptor; Columbia | |
| Italy | January 27, 2017 | Contemporary hit radio | Original | Sony | |
| United States | February 17, 2017 | Digital download | Remixes EP | Disruptor; Columbia | |
