= The Rocturnals =

The Rocturnals (formerly known as KansasCali)
- Origin: Las Vegas, Nevada, US
- Genres: Urban rock, Rock, Soul, Rap
- Occupation: Urban rock band
- Instruments: Bass guitar, lead guitar, electric guitar, drum, drum machine, turntables
- Years active: 2003–present
- Labels: Black Casino Music and Entertainment
- Members: A. "Pittboss" Johnson; Aulsondro "Novelist" Hamilton aka Emcee N.I.C.E. Eric "E" Borders; Adam Crow; Tristan "Trist" Cannizzaro
- Website: therocturnals.com

The Rocturnals (formerly known as KansasCali) is an American alternative rock band from Las Vegas, Nevada.

Formed in 2003, the band has five members, lead vocalist A. Johnson, lead vocalist-rapper Aulsondro Hamilton, lead guitarist Tristan Cannizarro, rhythm guitarist Adam Crow, and drummer Eric Borders. The band's mainstream debut came as KansasCali in 2004, when the song "If I..." appeared on both the soundtrack and DVD of the 2005 Academy Award-winning movie, Crash. The music video also featured in the "Special Features" section of the DVD and appeared on the concept album, Crash: Music from and Inspired by Crash.

== Biography ==
Following the band's success with Crash, it was invited to feature on the soundtrack for Mr. & Mrs. Smith. The band responded with a more mid-tempo song, in comparison to "If I...", entitled, "If I Never See You Again".

The band's soundtrack success led them to be selected by Tamara Coniff, former editor-in-chief of Billboard magazine, as the opening band for Billboard's 1st Annual Billboard Digital Entertainment Awards. The band was subsequently selected to appear on four other movie soundtracks: Haven, a 2004 action movie starring Orlando Bloom and Zoe Saldaña, ESPN's Once in a Lifetime: The Extraordinary Story of the New York Cosmos, about New York's soccer team, Kickin It Old Skool a comedy starring Jamie Kennedy and Bobby Lee, and John Feal's documentary Save The Brave.

== DVD controversy ==
The band's appearance on the Crash DVD did not occur without controversy. Bird York, who created the movie's theme song, "In the Deep", but did not feature on the DVD, complained about the band's inclusion. York communicated with Lionsgate, Bob Yari and Superb Records and requested to have the band's song removed, and it subsequently did not appear in the director's cut version of the DVD.

== Discography ==
=== Songs and albums ===
Songs & Album information 2002–present
"Celebrate The Earth" (single)
- Released: April 2011
- Label: Black Casino Music and Entertainment
The Life
- Released: January 2011
- Label: Black Casino Music and Entertainment
- Single: "The Life"
This Is Where Amazing Happens
- Released: February 2010
- Label: Black Casino Music and Entertainment
- Single: "This Is Where Amazing Happens"
- Debuted on NBA on TNT at the Rookie All-Star Game
Doctor Fink presents a Tribute to Prince
- Released: 2011
- Label: Orfin Records/Tommy Boy Entertainment
- Song: "Pop Life” (Track #3 on the CD)
In My America feat. The Rocturnals (Tribute LP)
- Released: 2009
- Label: USOFA (United Students Of America.org)
- Single: "In My America” (Track #1 on the CD)
Save The Brave Documentary
- Released: August 2008
- Label: The FEALGOOD Foundation
- Song: "In My America” feat. The Rocturnals (End Credits)
Kickin It Old Skool (movie)
- Released: April 27, 2007
- Label: Superb Records | Yari Film Group
- Song: "The Life” feat. KansasCali now known as The Rocturnals (End Title)
Once in a Lifetime (2006 film) starring Pelé

Once in a Lifetime: The Extraordinary Story of the New York Cosmos

- Song: “U Gotta Fight!” feat. KansasCali (track #12)
- Released: July 11, 2006
- Label: Superb Records
Haven (Original Motion Picture Soundtrack)

starring Orlando Bloom and Zoe Saldaña

- Song: “Uuuh” feat. KansasCali (disc 1 track #9)
- Released: September 19, 2006
- Label: Superb Records
It's All Love feat. KansasCali
- Artist: K-Ci Hailey
- Album: My Book (Track #3)
- Released: October 3, 2006
- Label: Head Start Music Group | Bungalo | Universal Music Group
- Singles: "I Apologize", "It’s All Love feat. KansasCali”
Crash: Music from and Inspired by Crash (soundtrack)
- Song: “If I...” feat. KansasCali (track #1)
- Released: June 7, 2005
- Label: Superb Records
Mr & Mrs. Smith (international soundtrack)

starring Brad Pitt and Angelina Jolie

- Song: “If I Never See You Again” feat. KansasCali (track #1)
- Released: July 22, 2005
- Label: Warner | Edel Music
Aaron Hall
- Album: Adult’s Only
- Song: “Serve That Body” feat. KansasCali (Track #3)
- Bonus Song: “Better Watch Your Girl” feat. KansasCali (Track #15)
- Released: July 26, 2005
- Label: Head Start Music Group
- Singles: "Sorry", "If I Never See U Again", and "Hello World"
KansasCali
- Album: Vegas One (The Beginning)
- Released: October 15, 2002
- Label: Familia Records
- Singles: "Teasin Me", "B4 U Say No”

== Television Show Songs ==
Songs for TV Shows & Specials, 2000–present
Lav Luv TV One comedy special "I'm Gonna Get in Trouble
- Released: 2009
- Network: TV One
- Song: "I’m Gonna Get In Trouble” feat. The Rocturnals
Lil jj comedy special "Almost Grown"
- Released: 2008
- Distributor: FarCor Studios | CodeBlack Entertainment
- Song: "Almost Grown” feat. The Rocturnals & DBI
Emmitt Smith presents "The Emmitt Zone"
- Released: 2003
- Network: KNXV-TV (Phoenix, Arizona)
- Song: "The Emmitt Zone” feat. KansasCali

=== Current members ===
- A. "Pittboss" Johnson – lead vocals, singer (2000–present)
- Aulsondro "Novelist" Hamilton – lead vocals, rapper (2000–present)
- Eric "E" Borders – drummer (2004–present)
- Adam "Crow" – guitarist (2006–present)
- Tristan "Trist" Cannizarro– lead guitarist (2010–present)
