= Heartless (Kanye West song) =

2008 single by Kanye West

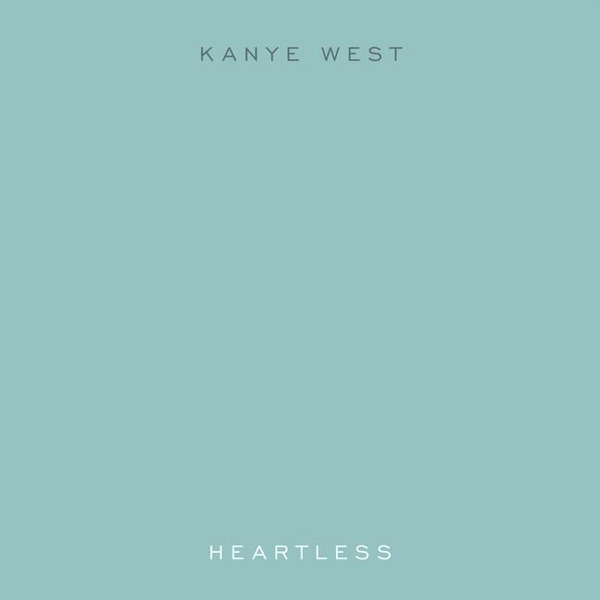

Single by Kanye West

from the album 808s & Heartbreak
- Released: October 28, 2008
- Recorded: 2008
- Studio: Glenwood (Burbank, California); Avex Recording (Honolulu, Hawaii); Crisp Recording Studios (Fayetteville, Arkansas)
- Genre: Pop
- Length: 3:31
- Label: Roc-A-Fella; Def Jam
- Songwriters: Kanye West; Ernest Wilson; Scott Mescudi; Malik Jones
- Producers: Kanye West; No I.D.

Kanye West singles chronology
| "Love Lockdown" (2008) | "Heartless" (2008) | "Go Hard" (2008) |

Music video
- "Heartless" on YouTube

"Heartless" is a song by American rapper Kanye West from his fourth studio album, 808s & Heartbreak (2008). The song was written by West, No I.D., Kid Cudi, and Malik Yusef, while being produced by the former two. It was passed on to West during recording sessions, after originally being intended for inclusion on Jay-Z's eleventh studio album, The Blueprint 3 (2009). Following the song's debut at the 2008 Democratic National Convention (DNC), West shared an unmastered version via his blog on October 15, 2008. The song was later serviced to American rhythmic contemporary radio stations as the second single from 808s & Heartbreak on October 28, through Roc-A-Fella and Def Jam. A pop ballad with influences of hip hop and R&B, it features synthesizers.

In the lyrics of the song, West reflects on his break-up with Alexis Phifer. "Heartless" received generally positive reviews from music critics, who mostly complimented West's performance. Some placed emphasis on the song's subject matter, while other critics praised the composition. At the 2010 BMI Pop Awards, it stood among the Award Winning Songs. The song reached number two on the US Billboard Hot 100. It further attained top 10 positions in Canada, New Zealand, Turkey, and the United Kingdom. Eventually being certified septuple platinum in the United States by the Recording Industry Association of America (RIAA), the song became one of the highest certified digital singles in the US. It has also received a quadruple platinum certification from the Australian Recording Industry Association (ARIA) in Australia, double platinum certification in Denmark by IFPI Danmark, and triple platinum certification in the UK by British Phonographic Industry (BPI).

The song's music video, released on November 7, 2008, is a tribute to Ralph Bakshi's 1981 film American Pop. The video is animated, with it showcasing West expressing sadness over breaking up with Phifer. Critics gave the video favorable reviews, generally praising the animation. At the 2009 BET Awards, it received a nomination for the Video of the Year award. West performed "Heartless" at the 36th Annual American Music Awards and the Coachella Valley Music and Arts Festival in 2008 and 2011, respectively.

"Heartless" has been subject to cover versions by various artists, including the Fray. The band debuted their cover on the Live Lounge for BBC Radio 1 in February 2009, before it was released as a single on April 17. A pop rock ballad, the cover reworks the original. The cover received mixed to positive responses from critics, some of whom praised the musical direction. It charted at number 79 on the Billboard Hot 100. An accompanying music video was released on August 18, 2009, which shows moving doodles that appear from a boy's notebook. Kris Allen also covered the song, premiering his version in May 2009 with a performance for season eight of American Idol, which he was the winner of. The performance gathered strong verdicts from the judges, including Simon Cowell. The cover was released as a single in May 2009, and it charted at number 16 on the Hot 100.

== Background and recording ==
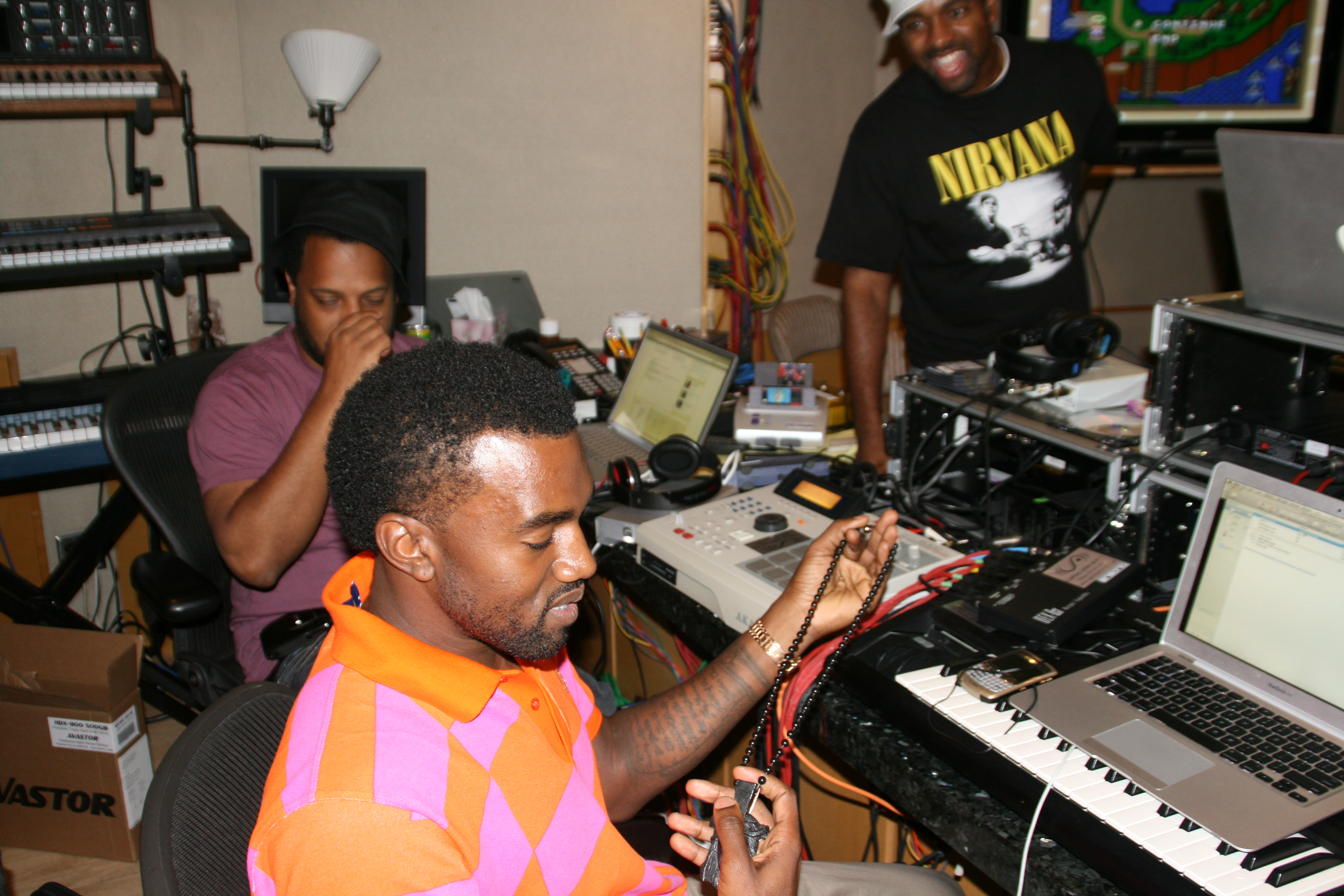
West and No I.D. (pictured center and left, respectively) working on the song in Glenwood Studios, Burbank, California.

After Kanye's mother Donda West died, his mentor No I.D. was contacted by American rapper Malik Yusef, who asked him to spend time with the artist. No I.D. initially rejected the decision due to their differing personalities, though later began communicating with Kanye West more after persuasion from Malik Yusef. West and No I.D. then travelled to Arkansas to work with rapper Jay-Z on his eleventh studio album The Blueprint 3 (2009), before West decided on transferring to recording for 808s & Heartbreak in the state once "Heartless" had been made. The recording took place at Avex Recording Studio in Honolulu, Hawaii, and at Glenwood Studios in Burbank, California. The song was produced by West, with co-production from No I.D. The two of them co-wrote it with Malik Yusef and fellow rapper Kid Cudi, the latter of which was revealed to have penned the chorus in his documentary film A Man Named Scott (2021). In a November 2014 interview for the Juan Epstein show, No I.D. recalled that the song was intended for The Blueprint 3 until West stopped during its recording and said, "No." Replying to him, No I.D. asked, "No what?"; West insisted: "No way! This is my record!" No I.D. begged him to complete the song for the album, to which West expressed assurance about it being for 808s & Heartbreak instead.

West confirmed the song's release as the album's second single at a concert of rapper T.I. on October 5. A snippet of the song experienced an internet leak on October 12, 2008. Three days later, West posted a full unmastered version of the song on his blog for download and streaming, blogging that he had "no words". Alongside the post, he shared photographs of fuzzy faced, nude models that had been displayed at a listening party for 808s & Heartbreak on October 14, 2008. "Heartless" was eventually released as a single on October 28, before West shared a newly mixed and mastered version to his blog on November 8, 2008, for download and streaming. West simultaneously called for the attention of DJs, requesting them to play the new version instead. Outside of the song, West does not rap at all on the album, though rap features are contributed to "Amazing" and "See You in My Nightmares" by Young Jeezy and Lil Wayne, respectively. In an interview with Kiss FM, West revealed that "Heartless" was one of the first two tracks that he created once he went "into album mode" after the success of his third studio album Graduation (2007). The song was recorded during the three week period that West worked on the entirety of 808s & Heartbreak in 2008. Seeking out a minimalist direction sonically, West directed his team to bring unique drum machines to Avex Recording Studio. They were sampled and reprogrammed into West's Roland TR-808 drum machine at the studio.

== Composition and lyrics ==
"Heartless"
A 19-second sample of the chorus to "Heartless", including the song's frequent percussion and synthesizers. The chorus also features Ken Lewis' stabs of piano, as well as organs and Auto-Tuned melodies. West showcases honesty and self-pity, closing out the chorus with an angry question.

Musically, "Heartless" is an upbeat pop ballad, with hip hop and R&B influences. According to the sheet music on Musicnotes.com, the song is set in the time signature of common time. It is composed in the key of B-flat minor with a moderate R&B tempo of 88 beats per minute and West's vocal range varies from a low of G♯_{2} to a high of F♯_{4}. The structure of the song is constructed around percussion, while synthesizers are prominently featured. The song includes the Roland TR-808 and piano stabs, the latter of which were contributed by Ken Lewis. Organs accompany the chorus, whereas keyboards appear in the background of the verses, played by West collaborator Jeff Bhasker. The song also contains a bassline, as well as Auto-Tuned melodies. West sings in Auto-Tune throughout, with him heavily utilizing the effect on the chorus. The song also includes rapping from West briefly.

Lyrically, "Heartless" features West's forceful and direct reflection on breaking up with his ex-fiancé Alexis Phifer. He expresses honesty and self-pity on the chorus: "The coldest story ever told / Somewhere far along this road / He lost his soul / To a woman so heartless". West also asks a question angrily twice before the chorus finishes: "How could you be so heartless?" Self-doubt is expressed on the song by West, who raps that despite having "homies", he is ultimately "still so lonely". West goes on to shed light on the post-breakup phase, assuming that Phifer will realize she is never going to find anybody better than him after two months.

== Release and reception ==
On October 28, 2008, the song was released to US rhythmic contemporary radio stations as the album's second single by West's record labels Roc-A-Fella and Def Jam. That same year, the labels issued a two-track CD single for it. On November 24, 2008, "Heartless" was included as the third track on West's fourth studio album 808s & Heartbreak. The song was met with generally positive reviews from music critics, many of whom praised West's performance. The staff of NBC4 Washington hailed the song as a perfect blend of "the cold, metallic 80s synth sound [West]'s been known for [as] of late" and "his older bouncing more straight forward Hip-Hop style", detailing that it is able to be upbeat alongside remaining melancholy as West sings in his Auto-Tuned "robotic croon" that T-Pain popularized. They continued, moderately comparing West's referencing of Phifer to rapper Eminem insulting his ex-girlfriend Kim Mathers, before assuring West's subject matter "makes good fodder for this super-slick space age, ragga-tinged gem" that you should download, then "pop it in your car and take a late night drive down Sunset Blvd". In a review of the song for Digital Spy, David Balls mildly asserted that it is not "exactly a warm and cosy affair"; he called the song a "dark, introspective slice of minor key pop". Balls elaborated by writing that even though creating the album "seems to have served as an alternative form of therapy" for West, the "terrific" song demonstrates how "the soul-bearing has propelled him to new creative peaks". Alex Macpherson from The Guardian pointed out how the song includes a "solipsistic and clumsy" take on "the solitude of the superstar", noticing West provides a "testament to his talent" by ultimately executing it. Reviewing the album for Entertainment Weekly, Leah Greenblatt commented that the "stuttering" song is among its understandably dominant "mournful tales of heartbreak", noting a confession from West.

The staff of NME viewed the song as fulfilling the promise of West "leading the assault" on the planet undertaken by "scowling hip-hop androids", which he makes on the previous track "Welcome to Heartbreak". They explained, citing how the former is the only track to include rapping from him and saying the "cathedral organs and lava-lamp rhythmic thuds underscore a dancehall-style tormented chorus that impacts with flooring intensity". Writing for Vibe, Jozen Cummings emphasised how the song's "clunky piano punches and throbbing bass line" lay "the sound bed" for the best break up track in rap since Jay-Z's "Song Cry" (2001). Jesal 'Jay Soul' Padania from RapReviews considered the song to be "ultra-catchy". USA Today's Steve Jones picked the song as one of tracks from 808s & Heartbreak to download, an opinion that was shared by the staff of The Observer and Alfred H. Leonard, III of IGN. For Spin, Charles Aaron felt the song possesses the potential to "end up on a greatest-hits comp one day and be accepted as Kanyeezy standards". In a lukewarm review at Pitchfork, Scott Plagenhoef characterized "Heartless" as a "very good" song that is a surprisingly appropriate fit for "the car radio" while naming it merely a "second-tier" single from West. Wilson McBee from Slant Magazine described the song as having all the qualities "of a classic, minor-key club anthem, darkly swaggering and indulgent of love's travails", though wished that it was performed by Usher instead. AllMusic editor Andy Kellman held a negative opinion, being surprised that the song's "synthetic calliope" is "unnerved".

=== Accolades ===
On Pitchfork writer Ryan Dombal's list of the best tracks of 2008, he placed "Heartless" at number 23. The track was voted in at number 55 on The Village Voice's Pazz & Jop poll for 2008, garnering 10 mentions. In 2020, Highsnobiety named it as West's eighth best song. That same year, the track was ranked by Teen Vogue as the 47th best breakup song for the newly single, with Kristi Kellogg estimating that it will be played repeatedly "when you're in the post-breakup anger phase". The track was nominated for seven industry awards and won six of them, including being one of the Award Winning Songs at the 2010 BMI Pop Awards. In the same year, it was awarded as one of the Most-Performed Urban Songs at the BMI R&B/Hip-Hop Awards.

Awards and nominations for "Heartless"
| Year | Ceremony | Category | Result | Ref. |
|---|---|---|---|---|
| 2009 | Teen Choice Awards | Choice Music: Rap/Hip-Hop Track | Nominated | |
| 2010 | ASCAP Pop Music Awards | Most Performed Songs | Won | |
| 2010 | ASCAP Rhythm & Soul Music Awards | Award Winning Rap Songs | Won | |
| 2010 | ASCAP Rhythm & Soul Music Awards | Award Winning R&B/Hip-Hop Songs | Won | |
| 2010 | BMI Pop Awards | Award Winning Songs | Won | |
| 2010 | BMI R&B/Hip-Hop Awards | Most-Performed Urban Songs | Won | |

== Music video ==
=== Background ===
An accompanying music video was directed and produced by Hype Williams, being set as a homage to Ralph Bakshi's film American Pop (1981); West admitted that inspiration was taken from the film after Williams showed it to him. For the video, Williams shot the footage of West prior to the technique of rotoscoped animation being utilized. The technique included 65 animators in Hong Kong drawing over every cell, after real people were filmed. West and Williams developed the video concept, while editorial and post-production house Chomet and visual effects company handled post-production, Stephan Zlotescu served as Art Director/VFX Supervisor, and Vlad Caprini was the Project Coordinator.

Michael Chomet explained that Williams approached the post-production house "with an almost impossible challenge: after picture-lock we had 10 days to deliver the goods". He emphasized the challenge as "a daunting task" that over 3,000 frames of hand-drawn animation and backgrounds were utilized for, though said that they managed "to pull it off in a record of 10 days working around the clock" with assistance from "a very talented team". Williams expressed his position for the video, asserting that he and West desired "to do something ... that was unexpected" and said they "needed a visual effects team that would deliver in terms of style, quality, and timing". He finalized by recalling having "worked with Stephan and Michael before", believing "that we could depend on them to pull it off". During his appearance at the 2008 American Music Awards, West premiered footage from the visual. The music video was released on November 7, 2008.

=== Synopsis ===
Throughout the animated music video, West expressing grief about his break-up with Phifer is interspersed with scenes of various women. The women are rotoscoped over West at times, with them having been drawn on top of the footage by hand. West wanders around a city while backed by the night sky at first, before he sits in a car's back seat. At one point, a portrait of Andy Warhol's artwork Campbell's Soup Cans is displayed. The locations that West appears in during the video are highly stylized, including a Miami street scene and a space-age version of Times Square. He briefly breaks his character, smoking a cigarette. At the end, West demonstrates frustration in an apartment while portraits of animated sitcom The Jetsons can be seen in the background.

=== Reception ===
The music video was well received by critics. Scratch from XXL said West hired "Hype 'Big Budget' Williams to draw upon ... Rotoscoping to keep our eyes glued to the screen", finalizing that the video is "an amazing work of art" and deservant of being "experienced on a big screen" while shining disappointment on West and Def Jam having "few outlets and opportunities for people to actually see [it]". Cesar Cueva of Art of the Cartoon felt both surprised and pleasured about the music video being animated, revealing himself to have instantly found the rotoscope style impressive. Cueva further wrote that after sensing a homage "to something I had seen before" with the video and having this confirmed by West citing inspiration from American Pop, he appreciated it more, and praised the sitcom portraits. For the Miami New Times, Jonathan Cunningham affirmed that the video "isn't bad" and he "can't complain about [West and Williams'] choice to go with an animated look rather than the standard video route", concluding by suggesting it is "mind-numbing entertainment to get you through the last day of the week". Larry Fitzmaurice of Vice named the visual a "Great video", viewing it as "no exception" to West's "cool-ass-looking videos" from the 808s & Heartbreak period and "a trippy cel-shaded experience stuffed with pop art and pop culture references" that was released simultaneously with West becoming "inextricably enmeshed in pop culture's DNA".

The visual was nominated for Video of the Year at the 2009 BET Awards, ultimately losing to Beyoncé's "Single Ladies (Put a Ring on It)". The former received a nomination for International Video Of The Year – Artist at the 2009 MuchMusic Video Awards, as well as being nominated for the awards of Best Hip-Hop Video and Best Male Video at the 2009 MTV Video Music Awards Japan. In 2012, the clip was listed by Rolling Stone as one of the greatest animated music videos of all time. Complex named the music video as West's 16th best six years later, directing praise towards the rotoscoping for making the cartoons "surprisingly lifelike in their motions".

== Commercial performance ==
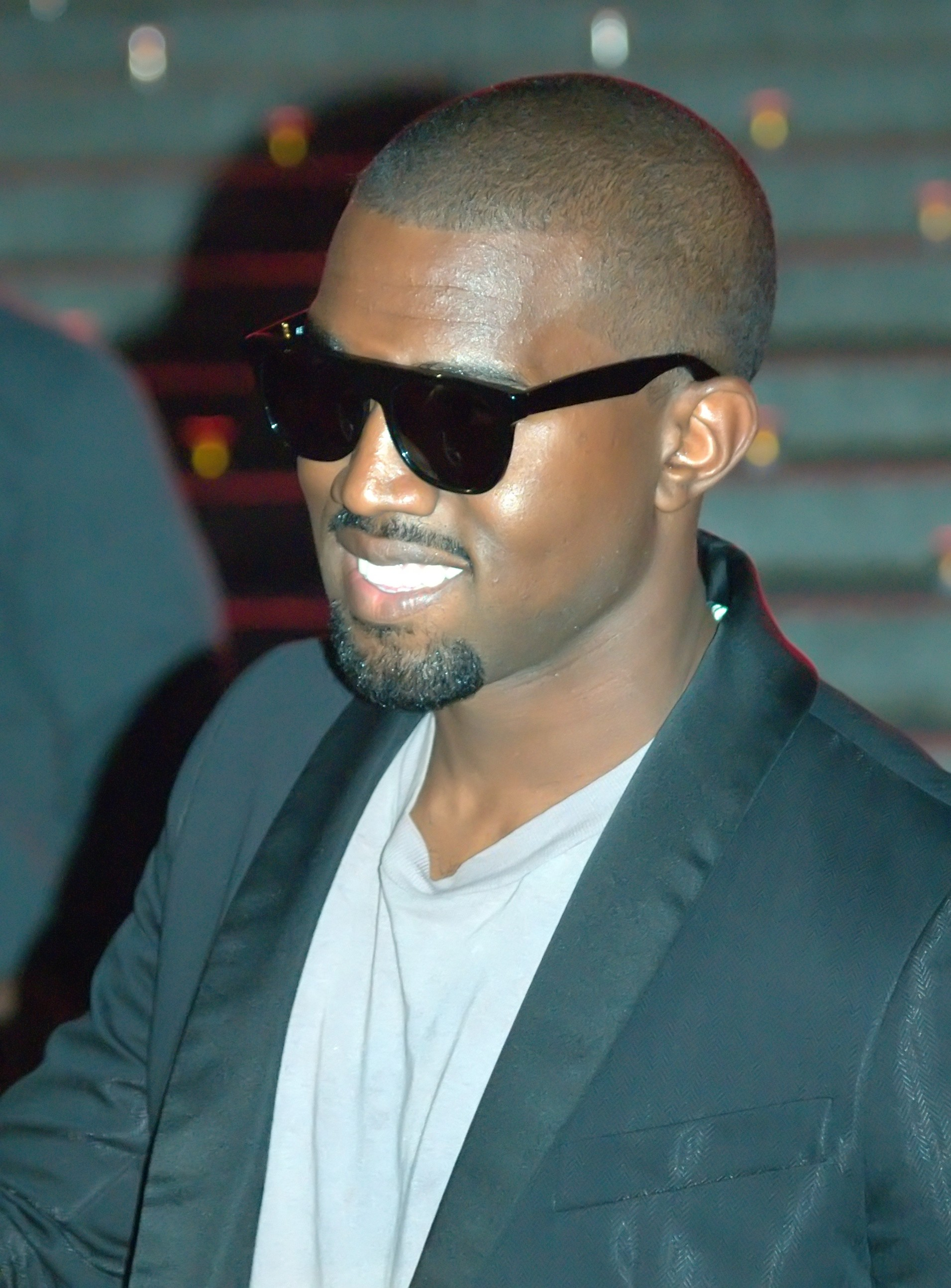
The song gave West his third top five entry of 2008 on the US Billboard Hot 100 in November, while it became his second highest-charting single overall on the Hot 100 two months later.

For the chart issue dated November 13, 2008, "Heartless" entered the US Billboard Hot 100 at number four, selling 201,000 downloads. It became West's 3rd top 5 entry of the year, as well as the 12th song overall to debut in the top 4 of the Hot 100 in the 21st century. After having fallen down the chart, the song reached number three on the Hot 100 for the issue date of January 15, 2009, simultaneously standing as the fastest growing track at radio. The song peaked at number two on the Hot 100 the following week, being blocked from the top position by Eminem's Dr. Dre and 50 Cent−featuring single "Crack a Bottle" and becoming West's second highest-charting single in the United States. In total, the song spent 30 weeks on the chart. As of May 31, 2018, the song ranks as West's fourth biggest hit of all time on the Hot 100.

The track debuted at number 13 on the US Billboard Pop 100 chart issue dated November 22, 2008, standing as the highest entry of the week. In its eighth week on the chart, the track entered the top 10 at number seven, before peaking at number four on March 7, 2009. The track topped both the US Billboard Hot Rap Songs and Rhythmic charts, giving West his first number one on the latter chart since "Gold Digger" in 2005. The former further reached number three on both the US Hot R&B/Hip-Hop Songs and Mainstream Top 40 charts. By September 2012, the track had surpassed 4,000,000 digital sales in the US, becoming West's third track to achieve this milestone and his second to do so as a lead artist. On September 23, 2020, "Heartless" was certified septuple platinum by the Recording Industry Association of America (RIAA) for amassing 7,000,000 certified units in the US, becoming one of the best-selling digital singles in the country by certification.

In Canada, the song opened at number eight on the Canadian Hot 100 for the issue dated November 22, 2008, becoming the week's highest entry. "Heartless" spent 22 weeks on the Hot 100. Elsewhere, the song debuted at number 36 on the New Zealand Singles Chart for the issue date of December 1, 2008. The song steadily rose up the chart during the succeeding nine weeks, which finished with it peaking at number six on the chart issue dated February 2, 2009. On July 12, 2009, the song was certified gold by Recorded Music NZ (RMNZ) for selling over 7,500 units in New Zealand. "Heartless" peaked at number 40 on the ARIA Singles Chart, and it had been certified quadruple-platinum by the Australian Recording Industry Association (ARIA) for shipments of over 280,000 copies in Australia in 2022. In Turkey, the song entered the Türkiye Top 20 at number 14 on the issue date of January 19, 2009, before peaking at number 2 in its 7th week on the chart. The song peaked at number 10 on the UK Singles Chart, and lasted for 20 weeks on it. As of October 24, 2019, the song ranks as West's 17th most successful track of all time on the chart. On October 30, 2026, "Heartless" was certified triple platinum by the British Phonographic Industry (BPI) for selling 1,800,000 units in the United Kingdom. The song further reached the top 40 in Ireland, Sweden, Denmark, the Netherlands, and Germany, with it receiving a triple platinum certification by IFPI Danmark for 270,000 shipments in the third of the five countries on November 10, 2026. The song peaked at number 36 on the European Hot 100 Singles chart, while it ranked as the ninth biggest digital song of 2009 worldwide, with sales of 5,500,000.

== Live performances ==
West performed the song during the Be the Change Youth Ball for Barack Obama's first inauguration in January 2009, changing lyrics of the chorus to reference him.

West first performed a portion of the song live in August 2008 for the ONE Campaign concert at the DNC in Denver, Colorado. Before his performance of "Heartless" for T.I.'s Myspace sponsored concert at the Key Club, Los Angeles, in October 2008, West announced that 808s & Heartbreak had been finished in Hawaii and the song would be released as a single. He abruptly ended the performance, complaining about not wanting it to end up on YouTube. West finished his appearance at the 2008 American Music Awards by performing the song. He wore a blue and red two-tone Pastelle varsity jacket for the performance, being accompanied by a neon back-drop. West transitioned from a performance of the song into one of fellow album track "Pinocchio Story" for Saturday Night Live (SNL) on December 13, 2008. On January 20, 2009, West performed the former at the Be the Change Youth Ball for the first inauguration of 2009–2017 US president Barack Obama. During an instrumental break in the song, Kanye West proclaimed that he "feels so good to be standing here" and Donda "would be so proud right now" in seeing "her baby boy performing the #1 song in the country for our new African-American president". West also said that his grandfather "drove the first car in the marches out of Oklahoma" to see the ball, before he sang an altered version of the song's chorus in tribute to both the civil rights struggle and Obama: "In the night I hear them talk/ The greatest story ever told, [...] Somewhere far along this road, a new soul: Obama ..."

West performed a medley of "Heartless" and "Pinocchio Story" as the eighth number of his February 2009 VH1 show, which was later issued as his second live album VH1 Storytellers in January 2010. He responded to rapper 50 Cent's comments about him being dressed differently in a Paris picture and addressed people who disputed his sexuality during the performance, remarking "look at me now, singing on the ground with my pink shirt on" and questioning, "Does this look gay to you?" On March 11, 2009, West delivered a performance of the song for his first appearance on American Idol, which included him jumping on a table in front of excited fans. At the 2009 iTunes Festival, Mr Hudson brought out West to perform the song, with West hugging the former's mainman Ben Hudson at the performance's ending. West performed the song during his headlining set at the 2011 Coachella Festival, during which the pitch shifting was handled by the concert's programmer Laura Escudé for enabling him to be heard as the Auto-Tune was turned on and off. He performed a remixed version at the 2013 Governors Ball that added feral growls. On February 25, 2014, West performed a five-minute medley of his greatest hits in chronological order by album on Late Night with Seth Meyers, which included "Heartless". West delivered a performance of the song in a low tempo for his headlining set at the 2015 Glastonbury Festival, beginning from the set's 38:04 mark. For West's two night concert of 808s & Heartbreak in full at the Hollywood Bowl in September 2015, him and Kid Cudi performed the song as the set's third track. West wore loose garments in white and off-white shades while performing, with backing from a small band and a medium-sized orchestra. Kid Cudi strengthened West's vocal runs when singing them, and the pair moved around the stage during the performance.

== Appearances in media ==
The fifth episode of the thirteenth season of the American television series South Park, titled "Fishsticks", aired on April 8, 2009. In the episode, the character Jimmy comes to realize that "fish sticks" sounds very similar to "fish dicks", birthing a joke involving telling other characters they are a "gay fish". Though main character Cartman attempts to take credit for the joke, a computer generated version of West fails to understand it at first. He eventually accepts himself to be a "gay fish", diving underwater and singing an Auto-Tuned parody of "Heartless" titled after the joke's main line. The day after its premiere, West responded to the episode via his blog, admitting South Park "murdered me last night" and it is "pretty funny". West blogged about his feelings being hurt but expected this from the show, also expressing thankfulness and confessing that if he continues to act as he has done, he will be subject to more of this type of content. The song was featured in video games Lips: Number One Hits and DJ Hero 2.

Christine and the Queens released a cover version of Christophe's "Les Paradis perdus" (1973) in October 2015 under the title of "Paradis perdus", which interpolates the chorus of "Heartless". In August 2016, West's wife Kim Kardashian included "Heartless" on a playlist of her 28 favorite songs from him. Lil Durk released a music video for his track "Kanye Krazy" on January 29, 2021, which includes him recreating the song's visual. In early 2022, Romanian singer and songwriter Sorana and French disc jockey David Guetta released "Redrum", which interpolated "Heartless".

== Cover versions ==
In early August 2009, American singer-songwriter William Fitzsimmons released an indie cover of "Heartless". During a Billboard exclusive one month prior to release, Fitzsimmons said when asked what gave him the desire to cover the song that he had always wanted "to get into top-40 hip-hop" and it was "the natural next step". Fitzsimmons specified how he was drawn in by a melancholic chord in the song that he found fun in discovering, highlighting the song not being taken too seriously and its poppy, heartbreaking, sweet, and poignant style. He asserted that the style may have been "lost on some people" due to the song being by West "and everything and the way it was produced", while thinking he achieved his goal of making the cover "far less compelling" than the original; he called this trying to "take something exciting and really make it boring". Fitzsimmons also felt it would be great if he "quoted a lot of these sarcastic things [from the song] as straightforward and serious", seeing some of the lyrics as "goofy" and "ridiculous". He finalized by opining that West "almost mak[es] light of the fact that there was real heartbreak there", considering it like "the teacher that whispers instead of yelling" due to converying a point "with more reservedness than straightforwardness". On the cover, Williams sings softly over a guitar and piano. He later performed "Heartless" on acoustic guitar for 1LIVE in February 2011. On May 17, 2010, singer Jason Derulo performed a cover of the song for an episode of web series Billboard Mashup Mondays. Explaining the reasoning behind his cover, Derulo additionally affirmed that he loves West's music and "Heartless" is one of his favorite songs from him. He went on to open up about its personal connection to him: "I can remember the time where I was on the brink of getting out of a bad relationship, and that's where this song stands." Derulo sang the cover with no vocal effects, in contrast to West's style for the original, as he had backing from keys and acoustic guitar.

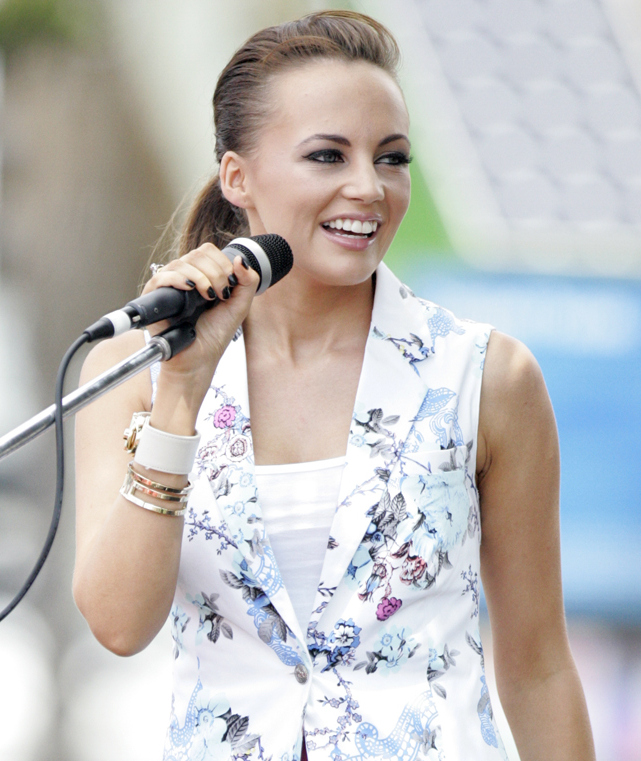
Samantha Jade performed the song in the semi-final for the fourth season of the Australian version of The X Factor, ultimately qualifying her for the final.

Singer Dia Frampton covered the song for the first live show of American competition The Voice on June 7, 2011, and played piano lightly alongside rephrasing the lyrics. The cover peaked at numbers 57 and 64 on the Billboard Hot 100 and Canadian Hot 100, respectively. In November 2012, Australian singer Samantha Jade performed a cover of "Heartless" as her first song in the semi-final of the fourth season for The X Factor of her native country; she received a standing ovation for the performance. The cover debuted at number 12 on the ARIA Singles Chart that same month, standing as the highest entry from the semi-final in Australia. Jade subsequently qualified for the season's final and won it, becoming the first solo female singer to do so.

On November 19, 2015, rapper Post Malone performed a cover of "Heartless" on acoustic guitar for Trevor Nelson in BBC Radio 1's Live Lounge. Post Malone combined indie and folk music, delivering a soulful cover. The rapper sang in a shaking tone and wore Stone Island clothing throughout, while he closed his eyes for the majority of the performance. On April 20, 2016, the first trailer for that year's psychological thriller film The Girl on the Train was released, which is set to a slowed version of the song. The version adds donk piano and new drums, accompanying Emily Blunt portraying Rachel Watson in the trailer. On September 18, 2018, violinist Brian King Joseph performed a cover of the song for the finale of America's Got Talent's 13th season, utilizing different methods of playing his violin. The violinist moved all around the stage during the performance, being backed by red-hot flames. The performance was received enthusiastically by the crowd and judges, and Brian King Joseph shouted afterwards: "Take me on tour, Kanye! Let's go!" On July 2, 2020, mysterious duo ilo ilo shared their cover of the song as a free download only. The cover features various stylistic elements, including lush synths, unique rhythms, and loud 808s and percussion.

== Track listing ==
CD single

1. "Heartless" – 3:30
2. "Heartless" (Video) – 3:39

== Credits and personnel ==
Information taken from 808s & Heartbreak liner notes.

Recording

- Recorded at Glenwood Studios (Burbank, California) and Avex Recording Studio (Honolulu, Hawaii)

Personnel

- Kanye West – songwriter, producer
- No I.D. – songwriter, co-producer
- Scott Mescudi – songwriter
- Malik Jones – songwriter
- Andrew Dawson – recorder
- Anthony Kilhoffer – recorder
- Chad Carlisle – assistant recorder
- Isha Erskine – assistant recorder
- Gaylord Holomalia – assistant recorder
- Christian Mochizuki – assistant recorder
- Manny Marroquin – mix engineer
- Christian Plata – assistant engineer
- Erik Madrid – assistant engineer
- Jeff Bhasker – keyboards
- Ken Lewis – piano

== Charts ==
=== Weekly charts ===
Chart performance for "Heartless"
| Chart (2008–2009) | Peak position |
|---|---|
| Australia (ARIA) | 40 |
| Austria (Ö3 Austria Top 40) | 57 |
| Belgium (Ultratop 50 Flanders) | 40 |
| Belgium (Ultratip Bubbling Under Wallonia) | 9 |
| Canada Hot 100 (Billboard) | 8 |
| Canada CHR/Top 40 (Billboard) | 2 |
| Canada Hot AC (Billboard) | 32 |
| Denmark (Tracklisten) | 18 |
| European Hot 100 Singles (Billboard) | 36 |
| Germany (GfK) | 37 |
| Hungary (Rádiós Top 40) | 21 |
| Ireland (IRMA) | 11 |
| Netherlands (Dutch Top 40) | 20 |
| Netherlands (Single Top 100) | 31 |
| New Zealand (Recorded Music NZ) | 6 |
| Sweden (Sverigetopplistan) | 17 |
| Switzerland (Schweizer Hitparade) | 46 |
| Türkiye Top 20 (Billboard Türkiye) | 2 |
| UK Singles (Official Charts) | 10 |
| UK Hip Hop/R&B (Official Charts) | 2 |
| US Billboard Hot 100 | 2 |
| US Hot R&B/Hip-Hop Songs (Billboard) | 4 |
| US Hot Rap Songs (Billboard) | 1 |
| US Pop Airplay (Billboard) | 4 |
| US Pop 100 (Billboard) | 4 |
| US Rhythmic Airplay (Billboard) | 1 |

2022–2024 chart performance for "Heartless"
| Chart (2022–2024) | Peak position |
|---|---|
| Global 200 (Billboard) | 143 |
| Slovakia Singles Digital (ČNS IFPI) | 46 |

Chart performance for Dia Frampton version
| Chart (2011) | Peak position |
|---|---|
| Canada Hot 100 (Billboard) | 64 |
| US Billboard Hot 100 | 57 |

=== Year-end charts ===
2009 year-end chart performance for "Heartless"
| Chart (2009) | Position |
|---|---|
| Australia Urban (ARIA) | 45 |
| Brazil (Crowley) | 72 |
| Canada (Canadian Hot 100) | 47 |
| Hungary (Rádiós Top 40) | 78 |
| UK Singles (OCC) | 122 |
| US Billboard Hot 100 | 9 |
| US Hot R&B/Hip-Hop Songs (Billboard) | 39 |
| US Mainstream Top 40 (Billboard) | 24 |
| US Rhythmic (Billboard) | 7 |
| Worldwide Digital Songs (IFPI) | 9 |

== Certifications ==
Certifications and sales for "Heartless"
| Region | Certification | Certified units/sales |
|---|---|---|
| Australia (ARIA) | 4× Platinum | 280,000^{‡} |
| Brazil (Pro-Música Brasil) | Gold | 30,000^{‡} |
| Denmark (IFPI Danmark) | 3× Platinum | 270,000^{‡} |
| Germany (BVMI) | Gold | 150,000^{‡} |
| Italy (FIMI) | Platinum | 100,000^{‡} |
| New Zealand (RMNZ) | 5× Platinum | 150,000^{‡} |
| Spain (Promusicae) | Gold | 30,000^{‡} |
| United Kingdom (BPI) | 3× Platinum | 1,800,000^{‡} |
| United States (RIAA) | 14× Platinum | 14,000,000^{‡} |
Ringtone
| United States (RIAA) Mastertone | Platinum | 1,000,000^{*} |
Streaming
| Greece (IFPI Greece) | 2× Platinum | 4,000,000^{†} |
^{*} Sales figures based on certification alone.^{‡} Sales+streaming figures based on certification alone.^{†} Streaming-only figures based on certification alone.

== Release history ==
Release dates and formats for "Heartless"
| Region | Date | Format | Label(s) | Ref. |
|---|---|---|---|---|
| United States | October 28, 2008 | Rhythmic contemporary radio | Roc-A-Fella; Def Jam | |
| Various | 2008 | CD single | Roc-A-Fella; Def Jam | |

== The Fray version ==
"Heartless"

Single by the Fray

from the album The Fray (Deluxe)
- Released: April 17, 2009
- Recorded: 2009
- Genre: Pop rock
- Length: 4:14
- Label: Epic
- Songwriters: Kanye West; Ernest Wilson; Scott Mescudi; Malik Jones

The Fray singles chronology
| "Never Say Never" (2009) | "Heartless" (2009) | "Syndicate" (2010) |

Music video
- "Heartless" on YouTube

"Heartless"
A 25-second sample of the Fray's cover of "Heartless", showcasing Isaac Slade's breathy vocal delivery that lacks Auto-Tune. He delivers pleas in a desperate manner, resembling the emotion of West on the original version.

During their appearance for the Live Lounge on February 16, 2009, American rock band the Fray performed their 2008 single "You Found Me" and a cover of "Heartless", marking the latter's debut. The following day, West shared a link to the cover over his blog. After its premiere, "Heartless" received a large amount of airplay the on radio. There was also an overwhelming public demand for a release, leading the Fray to record a studio version of the cover during 2009. The cover eventually experienced a single release in April of that year. Musically, "Heartless" is a pop rock ballad. The cover reworks the original, with no Auto-Tune being applied to the vocals. Lead vocalist Isaac Slade desperately makes breathy pleas, echoing West's emotion on the original.

The cover was released for digital download as a single on April 17, 2009. In August 2009, it was revealed that the band was set to release an accompanying digital extended play (EP). The EP was subsequently released digitally on September 27, consisting of three tracks. On November 10, 2009, "Heartless" was included on the second disc of the deluxe edition of the Fray's eponymous second studio album. During 2009, the cover was a frequent part of the Fray's live shows.

=== Reception ===
A writer for BBC Radio 1 saw "Heartless" as great, while MTV's Colin Schoenberger chronicled how the "aching, earnest pop-rock ballad" adopts "a sold life of its own" and believed the Live Lounge performance "begat other fantastic covers". Greenblatt affirmed that the Fray are equivalent to West in terms of vulnerability and angst; she called the cover "Vulnerable Angst Squared" and said "Slade's desperate, breathy pleas sound like the last gasp of someone with fatal emotional angina". In a negative review for MusicRadar, Ben Rogerson pinpointed the strangeness of the cover lacking the original's "Auto-Tuned vocal" and sounding "more human" as a whole, yet "com[ing] off significantly less powerful and soulful". Idolator critic noah derided the cover for being somewhat messy, complaining about Slade "blaaating all over an instrumental accompaniment that seems to be beamed in from a different galaxy". The cover entered the Billboard Hot 100 at number 79 for the issue dated May 30, 2009, based solely on downloads. It later peaked at number 26 on both the US Billboard Hot Rock & Alternative Songs and Rock Airplay charts, and had sold over 125,000 downloads in the US by August 2009.

=== Music video ===
On August 18, 2009, a music video for "Heartless" was released, which Hiro Murai directed. The video shows a classroom of elementary school students, focusing on a boy staring at his notebook. As he looks at a sheet of paper on it, moving doodles appear. These include creatures and the Fray, with the former being depicted as performing the song. The boy stares at a girl during various points and goes on to throw the sheet onto the floor, before the drawings transport themselves across the classroom to the blackboard. A tale of a heart being broken is told, with a bleeding heart being present to imply that the girl hurt her classmate.

==== Credits and personnel ====
Credits adapted from VideoStatic.

Filming

- Produced by Partizan
- Animated by Titmouse

Personnel

- Hiro Murai – director
- Ross Girard – production
- Clay Jeter – display picture
- Will Basanta – display picture
- Isaac Hagy – editing
- Emilio Ramirez – art director
- Cal Aurand – commissioner

=== Charts ===
Chart performance for the Fray version
| Chart (2009) | Peak position |
|---|---|
| US Billboard Hot 100 | 79 |
| US Hot Rock & Alternative Songs (Billboard) | 26 |
| US Rock & Alternative Airplay (Billboard) | 26 |

== Kris Allen version ==
"Heartless"

Single by Kris Allen

from the album Kris Allen
- Released: May 2009
- Length: 3:42
- Songwriters: Kanye West; Ernest Wilson; Scott Mescudi; Malik Jones
- Producer: Salaam Remi

Kris Allen singles chronology
| "Heartless" (2009) | "No Boundaries" (2009) |

On May 12, 2009, American musician Kris Allen performed a sparse solo acoustic cover of the song as his personal pick for the Top 3 night of the eighth season of American Idol. Allen played a flamenco–style beat, while he rocked a shirt covered with glitter. As Allen began to perform the final chorus, he made a grin that indicated self-satisfaction with his cover. The performance was reacted to with cries of applause from the female crowd members, as well as heavy praise from the show's judges. Simon Cowell admitted that after he had previously written Allen out of the competition, his verdict "changed with that performance". Randy Jackson declared the cover "better than the original", while Kara DioGuardi saw it as "bold, brave, [and] fearless". Allen's performance also qualified him for the finale of the eighth season, which he ultimately won.

"Heartless"
A 26-second sample of the chorus and beginning of the second verse to Kris Allen's cover of "Heartless" for the album, demonstrating the extremely delicate and light soundscapes that recall "In the Air Tonight" by Phil Collins.

In May 2009, shortly after Allen's performance for American Idol, a studio version of the cover was released for digital download as a single. The version is a largely sentimental number, with a smooth jazz style. Following the lack of positive reactions towards the cover, Allen decided on re-recording it for his self-titled debut studio album. Allen sought out record producer Salaam Remi for the new version's production, creating a sleeker version that recalls the heavily delicate and light soundscapes of Phil Collins' 1981 hit "In the Air Tonight". When asked by MTV about his biggest defeat throughout the process of debuting after the performance, Allen hesitantly answered that it was "Heartless". Allen explained this was due to the version being "a little bit different" for him, rather than not wanting to include the cover on the album. He also cited Remi as the one responsible for recalling "In the Air Tonight", while announcing the version as very different from his first one.

On November 17, 2009, "Heartless" was included as the 13th track on Kris Allen, being added as a bonus track. In a phone call with Vulture, Allen cast light on a "small discussion" he had about the cover being removed from the album following West's incident at the 2009 MTV Video Music Awards. Allen assured not everything should be based on West's actions, recalling that the discussion quickly ended. Even though he lacked enthusiasm about the cover, Allen acknowledged his fans' positive opinions and smiled as he praised how his brother likes it. The cover peaked at number 16 on the Billboard Hot 100, on which it spent three weeks. On the Canadian Hot 100, the cover reached number 39 and lasted for two weeks.

=== Charts ===
Chart performance for Kris Allen version
| Chart (2009) | Peak position |
|---|---|
| Canada Hot 100 (Billboard) | 39 |
| US Billboard Hot 100 | 16 |

== See also ==
- List of best-selling singles in the United States
