= The Fray (album) =

Studio album by the Fray
- Released: February 3, 2009
- Recorded: July 2008 in Denver, Colorado
- Genres: Alternative rock; pop rock
- Length: 43:25
- Label: Epic
- Producers: Aaron Johnson; Mike Flynn

The Fray chronology
Acoustic in Nashville: Bootleg No. 2 (2007)	The Fray (2009)	Live from the 9:30 Club: Bootleg No. 3 (2009)

Singles from The Fray
- 1. "You Found Me" Released: November 21, 2008; 2. "Never Say Never" Released: May 5, 2009; 3. "Heartless" Released: September 14, 2009; 4. "Syndicate" Released: January 12, 2010

The Fray is the second studio album by American alternative rock band the Fray. Released on February 3, 2009, through Epic Records, the album debuted at number-one on the Billboard 200 chart, and became a top 5 hit in Australia and Canada.

The album was preceded by the single "You Found Me," which charted in the top ten on the Billboard Hot 100 and reached the number-one spot in Australia. The second single from the album, "Never Say Never," was nominated for a Grammy Award for Best Pop Performance by a Duo or Group with Vocals in 2010. "Never Say Never" was also included on Transformers: Revenge of the Fallen – The Album.

Critical reception was mixed, and less positive than the band's debut album, How to Save a Life, with critics pointing out that the album was too similar to its predecessor. However, positive reviews also noted that despite the similarities, The Fray was "more focused" and "consistent" than its predecessor. The album was nominated for Best Pop Vocal Album at the 2010 Grammy Awards and has been certified double platinum by the RIAA, as well as gold by Music Canada and ARIA.

== Background ==
Following the success of their debut album, How to Save a Life in 2005 and an extensive tour which ended by mid-2007, the Fray began work on their second album. The band occasionally took breaks from recording, and performed some of their new songs on a few high-profile shows, most notably the song "You Found Me", which was then titled "Amistad". The band finished recording the album at the end of July 2008 for an early 2009 release. The album was produced by Aaron Johnson and Mike Flynn (the same production duo from the band's debut album) and recorded by Warren Huart. The song "Amistad" went through several changes and finally evolved into "You Found Me", which was chosen as the album's lead single. The band filmed a music video in Chicago for the song, which was directed by Josh Forbes.

The single debuted on November 20, during a commercial break of the show Grey's Anatomy. It was a one-minute promo with scenes from the then-upcoming season of ABC's Lost. "You Found Me" received heavy airplay in the United States, and became their third song to chart in the top ten on the Billboard Hot 100. It also became a success internationally, most notably in Australia where it reached number-one. The band performed the song live at the 2008 American Music Awards on November 23, and began touring in support of their second album.

On November 21, 2008, the album was made available for pre-order in standard, vinyl and deluxe versions. The deluxe version contains the CD in a Digipack case, a bonus DVD, an extended booklet and a set of postcards. The deluxe version of the album was only available for order in the United States. A documentary, titled Fair Fight, was sold with the first 300,000 copies of the album.

The band shot acoustic video performances of some of the songs from the album which were circulated on the internet before the album's release. Some songs of the album were also featured on a few TV shows: "Never Say Never" was on an episode of One Tree Hill as well as on the season five finale of Grey's Anatomy. The song "Happiness" was played on an episode of Brothers and Sisters. The second track on the album, "Absolute", charted on the Billboard Hot 100 at number 70, on the strength of a large number of digital downloads, despite not being released as a single.

== Critical reception ==
Professional ratings
Aggregate scores
Source	Rating
Metacritic	(56/100)
Review scores
Source	Rating
Absolute Punk	(83%)
Allmusic	3/5 stars
Billboard	(positive)
Blender	2.5/5 stars
Entertainment Weekly	C−
Jesus Freak Hideout	3.5/5 stars
musicOMH	2/5 stars
Rolling Stone	2/5 stars
Sputnikmusic	2/5 stars
US Weekly	3/4 stars

The album has received a score of 56 out of 100 from Metacritic based on "mixed or average reviews". Rolling Stone stated that "The band's piano rock suggests a more earnest, less arty Coldplay. The Fray are going for introspection and dramatic sweep but don't rise above bland pleasantries." An Entertainment Weekly review stated, "The Fray is all blah, all the time: more minor-key melodies, more dreary tempos, more of singer-pianist Isaac Slade's spiceless sore-throat croon." Allmusic, whilst giving the album a modestly positive review, echoed many of these statements, saying that the "songcraft remains virtually unchanged" and that the album lacks any "purported originality." BBC Music too gave the album an overall positive review, stating "there are enough haunting hooks and delicately well written tunes here".

Absolute Punk criticized the negative reviews, "For what it's worth, the Denver quintet has released a charming, appealing record that would be far more praiseworthy if it didn't sound so much like its predecessor...it may be an album a lot like its predecessor, but that isn't exactly a bad thing." Uncut gave the album a score of 4 out of 5 stars, stating the album was "not only a radio-friendly unit-shifter, but also a bona fide guilty pleasure."

== Commercial performance ==
The Fray was released on February 3, 2009. Following the success of "You Found Me", the album debuted at number 1 on the U.S. Billboard 200, selling 179,000 copies in its first week of release. It then dropped to number 4 the next week selling 75,000 copies. The album re-entered the Billboard 200 at No. 96 chart on the week ending March 7, 2010, and dropped out in the following week. According to Soundscan, as of February 2012, the album had sold 897,000 copies in the U.S.

== Track listing ==
All tracks are written by Isaac Slade and Joe King, except where noted.

No.	Title	Writer(s)	Length
1.	"Syndicate"		3:32
2.	"Absolute"		3:47
3.	"You Found Me"		4:04
4.	"Say When"	Isaac Slade	5:02
5.	"Never Say Never"		4:16
6.	"Where The Story Ends"		3:57
7.	"Enough For Now"		4:14
8.	"Ungodly Hour"		5:04
9.	"We Build Then We Break"		3:48
10.	"Happiness"	Isaac Slade	5:22
Total length:			43:25

Deluxe Edition

1. "Heartless" – 4:16 (First time on CD) (Kanye West cover)
2. "Never Say Never" – 4:21 (Live with the London Quartet)
3. "You Found Me" – 4:05 (Live with the London Quartet)
4. "Where the Story Ends" – 3:20 (Piano Version)
5. "Fair Fight" – 3:08 (Live)
6. "Be The One" – 3:30 (New song demo)
7. "Uncertainty" – 3:16
8. "How To Save A Life" – 4:58 (Live from Webster Hall)

iTunes Bonus Tracks

1. "Fair Fight" – 2:45 (Slade)

Deluxe edition iTunes bonus tracks

1. "Where the Story Ends" (Piano Version)
2. "Absolute" (Acoustic Version)
3. "You Found Me" (Acoustic Version)
4. "Fair Fight"
5. "Uncertainty"

Pre-order iTunes bonus track (for both iTunes editions)

"Enough for Now" (Acoustic Version)

Bonus DVD

1. "You Found Me" (Video)
2. "You Found Me" (Making the Video)
3. "Making the Album"(Video)

== Singles ==
- The lead single from the album, "You Found Me," was released in November 2008 and peaked at No. 7 on the Billboard Hot 100. The song spent 38 weeks on the chart. It reached No. 1 on the Billboard Hot Adult Top 40 Tracks chart as well as Australia's ARIA Charts and is the band's third song to sell 2 million downloads in the United States. The song charted in the top ten in Ireland and Greece and at No. 12 in Canada.
- The second single, "Never Say Never," was released in May 2009 and peaked at No. 32 on the Billboard Hot 100. The song spent 20 weeks on the chart. It was also nominated for a Grammy Award for Best Pop Performance by a Duo or Group with Vocals.
- The Fray recorded a cover of Kanye West's "Heartless," which was the album's third single. They covered the song for Radio 1's Live Lounge in February and the track has since become a highlight in their live set. Having already sold 125,000 copies in the US, the Fray released it as a digital single in the UK on 14 September 2009. The song was added on the deluxe edition of the album, which was released on 10 November 2009, and was also added on their live album, The Fray: Live from SoHo.
- The fourth single, "Syndicate," was released for radio airplay on 12 January 2010. The music video premiered on February 9, 2010, on Yahoo! Music. The song debuted at No. 25 on the Hot Adult Top 40 Tracks chart and peaked at No. 16. Despite a generally positive critical reception, the song was the lowest charting single from the album, and the band's second single to miss the Hot 100 chart.

== Personnel ==
The Fray

- Isaac Slade – lead vocals, acoustic piano
- Dave Welsh – lead guitars, bass guitar
- Joe King – rhythm guitars, backing vocals, lead vocals on "Ungodly Hour", bass guitar
- Ben Wysocki – drums, percussion

Additional musicians

- Zach Rae – keyboards
- Dan Lavery – bass guitar
- Dan Rothschild – bass guitar
- David Campbell – string arrangements

== Production ==
- Mike Flynn – producer, A&R
- Aaron Johnson – producer
- Warren Huart – engineer
- Troy Brazell – assistant engineer
- Chris Cheney – assistant engineer
- Brian Joseph – assistant engineer
- Marlin Luna – assistant engineer
- George Nixon – assistant engineer
- Jonathan Parker – technical engineer
- Jeff Lisenmaier – drum technician
- Michael Brauer – mixing (1, 3–10)
- Serban Ghenea – mixing (2)
- Will Hensley – Pro Tools engineer, mix assistant (1, 3–10)
- Ryan Gilligan – second mix engineer (1, 3–10)
- John Haynes – Pro Tools mix engineer (2)
- Tim Roberts – mix assistant (2)
- Bob Ludwig – mastering
- Chara Kramer – A&R coordinator
- Katie Welle – A&R coordinator
- Nathan Johnson – art direction, artwork, photography
- Marke Johnson – art direction, design, layout, artwork
- James Minchin III – band photography

Studios

- Recorded at The Plant Studios (Sausalito, California) and Candyland Studios (Denver, Colorado).
- Additional recording at Glenwood Recording Studios (Burbank, California) and Swinghouse Studios (Los Angeles, California).
- Strings recorded at Mad Hatter Studios (Los Angeles, California).
- Mixed at Quad Studios (New York City, New York) and MixStar Studios (Virginia Beach, Virginia).
- Mastered at Gateway Mastering (Portland, Maine).

== Charts ==
=== Weekly charts ===
Weekly chart performance for The Fray
Chart (2009)	Peak position
Australian Albums (ARIA)	3
Austrian Albums (Ö3 Austria)	49
Belgian Albums (Ultratop Flanders)	59
Belgian Albums (Ultratop Wallonia)	60
Canadian Albums (Billboard)	2
Dutch Albums (Album Top 100)	54
French Albums (SNEP)	58
German Albums (Offizielle Top 100)	46
Irish Albums (IRMA)	13
Italian Albums (FIMI)	59
New Zealand Albums (RMNZ)	19
Scottish Albums (Official Charts)	12
Spanish Albums (Promusicae)	78
Swiss Albums (Schweizer Hitparade)	47
UK Albums (Official Charts)	8
US Billboard 200	1
US Top Alternative Albums (Billboard)	1
US Top Rock Albums (Billboard)	1

=== Year-end charts ===
Year-end chart performance for The Fray
Chart (2009)	Position
Australian Albums (ARIA)	51
US Billboard 200	35
US Top Rock Albums (Billboard)	10

== Certifications ==
Certifications and sales for The Fray
Region	Certification	Certified units/sales
Australia (ARIA)	Gold	35,000^{^}
Canada (Music Canada)	Gold	40,000^{^}
New Zealand (RMNZ)	Gold	7,500^{‡}
United Kingdom (BPI)	Silver	60,000^{*}
United States (RIAA)	2× Platinum	2,000,000^{‡}
^{*} Sales figures based on certification alone.^{^} Shipments figures based on certification alone.^{‡} Sales+streaming figures based on certification alone.
