= Never Say Never (The Fray song) =

Single by The Fray

from the album The Fray
- Released: May 5, 2009
- Recorded: 2008
- Genre: Alternative rock, pop rock
- Length: 4:16 (Album Version); 4:02 (Half Guitar Solo Edit); 3:50 (Radio Edit)
- Label: Epic
- Songwriters: Isaac Slade and Joe King
- Producers: Aaron Johnson and Mike Flynn

The Fray singles chronology
"You Found Me" (2008)	"Never Say Never" (2009)	"Heartless" (2009)

"Never Say Never" or "Never Say Never (Don't Let Me Go)" is a song by Denver-based piano rock band the Fray that was included on their second studio album, The Fray. It is the second single from the album and is a direct love song between two people who are "pulling apart and coming together again and again."

The song was certified Platinum by the RIAA in August 2010 and was ranked No. 100 on Billboard's Hot 100 songs of 2009 list. It was nominated for a Grammy Award for Best Pop Performance by a Duo or Group with Vocals in 2010.

The song is present on the soundtrack of the film Transformers: Revenge of the Fallen - The Album and is used when Sam and Mikaela are bidding farewell to each other at the beginning of the film, and on promos of Inuyasha: The Final Act's last episode on Animax Asia.

There are currently three versions of the song: the full album version and two radio edits (Half Guitar Solo Edit and Radio edit), which are shorter and cut out a portion of the song's guitars.

== Reception ==
Overall, critical response to "Never Say Never" was mixed. US Weekly found the single "riveting" and complimented on lead singer Isaac Slade's falsetto. Another positive mention came from New Music Reviews: "When The Fray releases a single, you know it's going to be amazing, and this is another one of those singles. Truly amazing again! 9/10." AbsolutePunk described "Never Say Never" as "a syrupy ballad" that is "nothing short of astonishing. There's falsetto towards the end and its romantic, wistful and full of understated grace. Backed by strings and a swelling rhythm section, it's a polished and positive step forward [for the band]."

However, David Sessions, editor of Patrol magazine, wrote: "It's the CCM formula without the Jesus: pre-bottled concoctions (strings, astral guitar strumming) slathered on to enliven a fatally soulless mix." Glenn Gamboa, in a review for Newsday, criticized the song, and the album as a whole, for essentially "sound[ing] the same" as the band's previous work, noting: "It's not a bad sound, but it's also not a necessary one. The conservative songs of The Fray try to shut out the possibility of messing up, but they end up shutting out the possibility of succeeding as well." A reviewer for musicOMH.com wrote: "'Never Say Never' and 'Ungodly Hour' are the band's closest approximations to the big Coldplay piano ballad, but without Chris Martin's quirky Englishness (and I never thought I would say that) both tracks ultimately collapse under the weight of their conceits."

== Music video ==
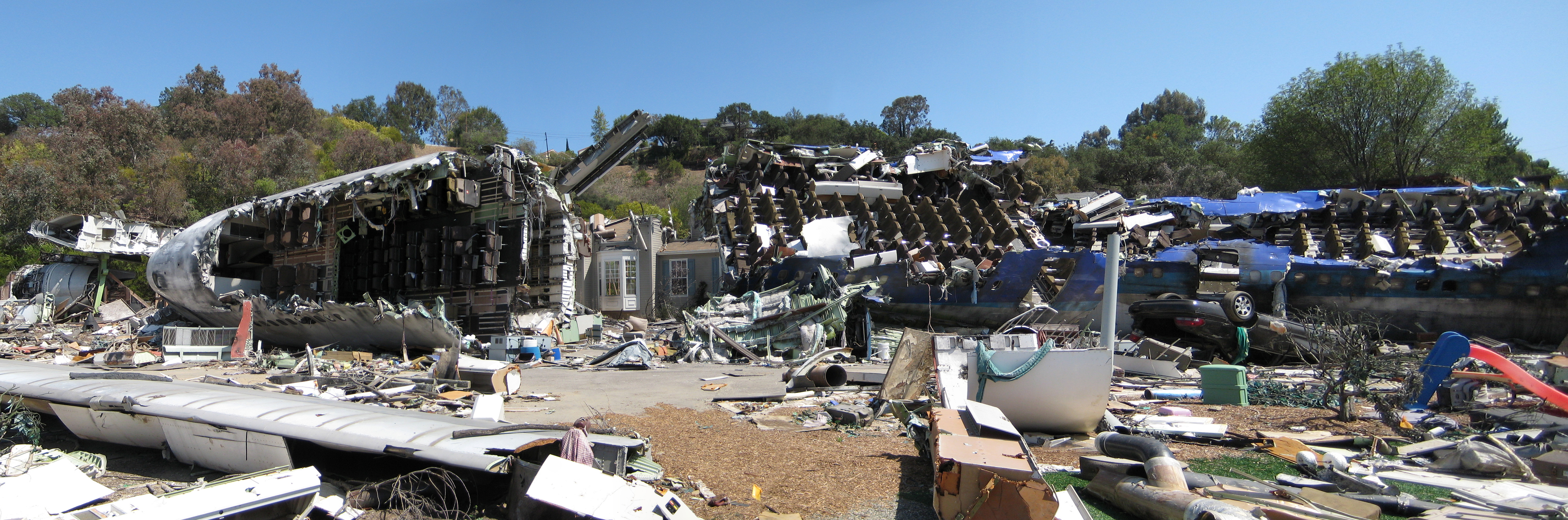
Destroyed Boeing 747 used on the Fray's "Never Say Never" music video.

On the March 14th episode of the VH1 Top 20 Video Countdown, the Fray stated in an interview that a video was in the works around that time. The music video for "Never Say Never" surfaced on the internet on April 17, but the video officially premiered on the internet only on April 24, through the band's MySpace page. It premiered everywhere else on television May 5, 2009.

The video takes place in one only sequence, featuring singer and pianist Isaac Slade walking through a destroyed suburban street after some sort of accident or attack. While Isaac walks through the street, people run and police officers and soldiers try to save others in the ruins. The video ends with Isaac finding a woman (played by Jaime King) who was obviously looking for him. The video ends with the two and everyone else in the neighborhood looking to the distant Los Angeles cityscape before it completely explodes. The set used in the aftermath of the plane crash scene from Steven Spielberg's War of the Worlds was also used to film this clip, located at Universal Studios in Hollywood.

== Charts ==
Chart (2009)	Peak position
Australia (ARIA)	38
Canada Hot 100 (Billboard)	51
Canada Hot AC (Billboard)	22
UK Singles (OCC)	87
US Billboard Hot 100	32
US Adult Alternative Airplay (Billboard)	19
US Adult Contemporary (Billboard)	26
US Adult Pop Airplay (Billboard)	7

=== Year-end charts ===
Chart (2009)	Position
US Billboard Hot 100	100
US Adult Top 40 (Billboard)	21

== Certifications ==
Region	Certification	Certified units/sales
New Zealand (RMNZ)	Gold	15,000^{‡}
United Kingdom (BPI)	Silver	200,000^{‡}
United States (RIAA)	2× Platinum	2,000,000^{‡}
^{‡} Sales+streaming figures based on certification alone.

== Release history ==
Release dates and formats for "Never Say Never"
Region	Date	Format	Label(s)	Ref.
United States	May 18, 2009	Mainstream airplay	Epic	
