= Redrum (Sorana and David Guetta song) =

Single by Sorana and David Guetta
- Released: 20 January 2022
- Genre: Dance-pop
- Length: 2:52
- Label: Atlantic
- Composer(s): Jeffrey Bhasker; Mikkel Cox; Thomas Eriksen; Tobias Frederiksen; David Guetta; Malik Jones; Mr Hudson; Scott Mescudi; Benjamin McIldowie; Anton Rundberg; Giorgio Tuinfort; Kanye West; Ernest Wilson
- Lyricist(s): Sorana Păcurar; Julia Karlsson; Rollo Spreckley
- Producer(s): Toby Green; David Guetta; Cox

Sorana singles chronology
"Drowning" (2019)	"Redrum" (2022)	"Karaoke" (2022)

David Guetta singles chronology
"Permanence" (2022)	"Redrum" (2022)	"Silver Screen (Shower Screen)" (2022)

Music video
- "Redrum" on YouTube

"Redrum" (stylized as "redruM"; reverse of "Murder") is a song by Romanian singer and songwriter Sorana and French disc jockey David Guetta. It was released for digital download and streaming on 20 January 2022 by Atlantic Records. The song was written by Sorana and 15 others, including Jeffrey Bhasker, Mikkel Cox, Guetta, Malik Jones, Mr Hudson, Scott Mescudi, Giorgio Tuinfort, Kanye West and Ernest Wilson, while the production was handled by Toby Green, Guetta and Cox. A dance-pop track about a love triangle and a resulting heartbreak, it interpolates the refrain of West's 2008 song "Heartless".

Music critics gave positive reviews of "Redrum" upon its release, praising the catchiness, Sorana's vocal delivery and the production. Commercially, the song reached number ten in Bulgaria and the top 20 in the Commonwealth of Independent States (CIS), Russia and the Netherlands. An accompanying music video was uploaded to Guetta's YouTube channel simultaneously with the single release. Directed by Andra Marta, Alexandru Mureșan and Cristina Poszet, it portrays Sorana being chased by a clone of herself through the hallways of a hotel. Observers likened the visual and the singer's outfit to the 1980 psychological horror film The Shining and fictional superheroine Sailor Moon, respectively.

== Background and composition ==
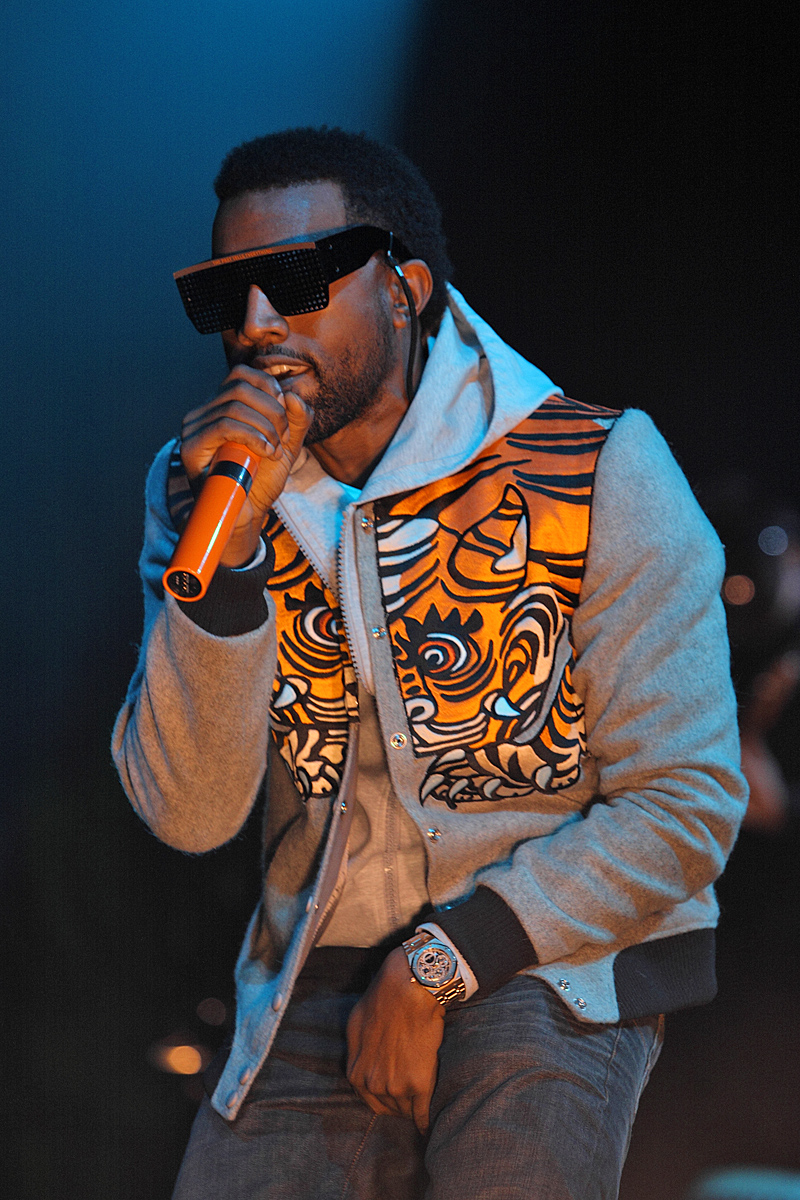
"Redrum" interpolates Kanye West's (pictured in 2008) "Heartless" (2008), something West personally gave his permission to.

Sorana has left her native country of Romania to pursue a musical career and relocated to London and then Los Angeles. Her work as a songwriter includes the commercially successful singles "Takeaway" (2019) by the Chainsmokers, Illenium and Lennon Stella, "OMG What's Happening" (2020) by Ava Max and "Heartbreak Anthem" (2021) by Galantis, Guetta and Little Mix. Furthermore, Sorana has also provided features for artists such as Alan Walker on "Lost Control" (2018).

"Redrum", Sorana's debut single under Atlantic Records, was released for digital download and streaming on 20 January 2022, in collaboration with fellow lead artist Guetta. It was written by Sorana and 15 others, including Jeffrey Bhasker, Mikkel Cox, Guetta, Malik Jones, Mr Hudson, Scott Mescudi, Giorgio Tuinfort, Kanye West and Ernest Wilson, while the production was handled by Toby Green, Guetta and Cox. West personally approved an interpolation of the refrain of his 2008 song "Heartless" in "Redrum", leading to him, Jones, Mescudi and Wilson receiving credits. "Redrum", the song's title, is a palindrome for "Murder" that originates from a scene in the 1980 psychological horror film The Shining; an alternative stylization is "redruM". Musically, "Redrum" is a dance-pop track backed by "Guetta's signature driving bass lines and huge synths". Regarding its meaning, Sorana stated:

"['Redrum'] tells the story of two people falling in love with the same person. In the end, one will be happy in love and the other one will be heartbroken. In the lyrics, I compare the pain of heartbreak to a murder because in my experience, heartbreaks have been tough and hard to get over. The song is an ironic take on how people dramatically react to heartbreak. Love comes and goes so we might as well enjoy it while it lasts."

On 4 February 2022, a MistaJam remix of "Redrum" was released. Nicole Pepe of We Rave You thought that it "breathes a new life into the original by adding more hypnotic and spacey synths, and an edgy faster tempo"; she further noticed "a darker underlying tone" and "early 2000's EDM vibes". Robin Schulz also issued a remix on 16 February 2022, with Dancing Astronaut's Rachel Narozniak labelling it as a "beat-driven take on [the] original [that] maintains the easy-listening appeal present [...] but picks up the pace just slightly".

== Reception ==
Upon release, "Redrum" was met with positive reviews from music critics. We Rave You's Ellie Mullins thought that "the heartbreak [in the song's lyrics] is perfectly conveyed through the passion of [Sorana's] stunning vocals. Completing the track and putting the cherry on top, Guetta creates a passionate and intricate soundscape that allows for [her] talents to shine to their fullest ability." Nassim Aziki, writing for Fun Radio, noticed a "powerful chorus" and a "terribly beautiful voice" resembling that of Sia.

Another editor from Fun Radio highlighted the song's similarities to "Dangerous" (2014) and "Flames" (2018) from Guetta's catalogue. A writer of CelebMix commended the song, writing that it "beautifully showcases Sorana's knack for catchy hooks and artful storytelling as well as [...] Guetta's ability to craft sleek productions. This one's made to be played over and over again and will get stuck in your head for a while". Commercially, "Redrum" attained modest peaks in several countries, including number ten in Bulgaria, number 17 in the Commonwealth of Independent States (CIS), number 26 in Croatia, number 18 in the Netherlands and number 13 in Russia.

== Music video ==
An accompanying music video was uploaded to Guetta's YouTube channel on 20 January 2022. It was directed by Andra Marta, Alexandru Mureșan and Cristina Poszet, while Mureșan was also hired as the director of photography and Nicoleta Darabană as Sorana's double. The clip opens with a fuzzy television screen displaying the song's title. Sorana is seen lying next to it on the floor of a room with pulsating lights and pop art of Guetta; as she nears the television, she is being grabbed into it by her mouth by a clone of herself. Sorana subsequently finds herself in a hallway of a 1980s-styled hotel along with her clone, who has a white outfit, neon blue braids and long nails while carrying a knife in her hands that are covered by a pink liquid. The clone proceeds into chasing Sorana through the hallway which displays further portraits of Guetta. Although Sorana runs away and hides, they eventually meet and fight on top of each other. The singer is then portrayed in a bathtub with pink liquid wherein she drowns, before the video ends with a shot of Sorana in the room shown at the beginning; her hands and outfit are covered with the liquid.

Observers likened the hotel shown during the clip to The Shining and Sorana's appearance to that of the fictional superheroine Sailor Moon. While Major called the video "dark and twisted", Aziki thought the singer's outfit is "very extravagant". Rachel Kupfer, writing for EDM.com, opined that the clone was the "murderous new girlfriend" of Sorana's ex and further stated that the "cotton candy-colored" visual had "futuristic, alien-like fashion and [...] dramatics [that] are off the charts". An editor of CelebMix spoke highly of the clip, naming it "probably one of the most aesthetically-pleasing music videos we have seen over the last couple of months".

== Track listing ==
- Official versions (Note: This acts as a summary of all digital versions of the single.)
1. "Redrum" – 2:52
2. "Redrum" (MistaJam Remix) – 3:03
3. "Redrum" (Robin Schulz Remix) – 2:56

== Credits and personnel ==
Credits adapted from Spotify and YouTube.

Songwriting and technical credits

- Jeffrey Bhasker – songwriter
- Ron Cabiltes – sample clearance
- Pedro Calloni – vocal mix
- Mikkel Cox – songwriter, producer
- Scott Desmarais – mix engineer assistant
- Thomas Eriksen – songwriter
- Robin Florent – mix engineer assistant
- Tobias Frederiksen – songwriter
- Chris Galland – mix engineer
- Toby Green – producer
- David Guetta – songwriter, producer
- Jeremie Inhaber – mix engineer assistant
- Malik Jones – songwriter
- Mr Hudson – songwriter
- Julia Karlsson – songwriter
- Emerson Mancini – mastering
- Manny Marroquin – mixing
- Scott Mescudi – songwriter
- Benjamin McIldowie – songwriter
- Sorana Păcurar – vocals, songwriter
- Madalin Roșioru – vocal engineering
- Anton Rundberg – songwriter
- Rollo Spreckley – songwriter
- Giorgio Tuinfort – songwriter
- Kanye West – songwriter
- Ernest Wilson – songwriter
- Danny Zook – sample clearance

Music video credits

- Dragoș Constantine – styling, costume design
- Nicoleta Darabană – body double
- Ilina Dumitru – hair stylist
- Malvina Isfan – make-up artist
- Andra Marta – director, edit
- Alexandru Mureșan – director, director of photography, color grading
- Hilke Muslim – styling, costume design
- Trevor Joseph Newton – video commissioner
- Cristina Poszet – director
- Cătălina Stoica – nail artist

== Charts ==
=== Weekly charts ===
Weekly chart performance for "Redrum"
Chart (2022–2023)	Peak position
Bulgaria International (PROPHON)	10
CIS Airplay (TopHit)	18
Croatia International Airplay (Top lista)	26
Kazakhstan Airplay (TopHit)	118
Netherlands (Dutch Top 40)	18
Netherlands (Single Top 100)	71
Russia Airplay (TopHit)	16
US Hot Dance/Electronic Songs (Billboard)	40

=== Monthly charts ===
2022 Monthly chart performance for "Redrum"
Chart (2022)	Peak position
CIS Airplay (TopHit)	22
Russia Airplay (TopHit)	20

=== Year-end charts ===
Year-end chart performance for "Redrum"
Chart (2022)	Position
CIS Airplay (TopHit)	115
Russia Airplay (TopHit)	125

== Release history ==
Release dates and formats for "Redrum"
Country	Date	Format(s)	Version	Label	Ref.
Various	20 January 2022	Digital download; streaming	Original version	Atlantic	
Various	4 February 2022	Digital download; streaming	MistaJam remix	Atlantic	
Various	17 February 2022	Digital download; streaming	Robin Schulz remix	Atlantic	

== See also ==
- List of music released by Romanian artists that has charted in major music markets
