= Syndicate (song) =

Single by The Fray

from the album The Fray
- Released: January 12, 2010
- Recorded: 2008
- Genre: Pop rock
- Length: 3:32
- Label: Epic
- Songwriters: Isaac Slade and Joe King
- Producers: Mike Flynn and Aaron Johnson

The Fray singles chronology
"Heartless" (2009)	"Syndicate" (2010)	"Heartbeat" (2011)

"Syndicate" is a song by Denver-based rock band the Fray. It is the opening track and the fourth single from their eponymous second studio album. It was released on January 12, 2010, for radio airplay, and the music video was released on February 9, 2010. While received positively by critics, the song is the lowest-charting single from the album.

== Critical reception ==
AbsolutePunk stated the song had "a winning piano line" and commented upon its musical style, saying it "pushed out into a grander, denser sound than found before." Sputnikmusic called it an "uplifting opener."

== Music video ==
The music video, directed by Mark Pellington, premiered on February 9, 2010, on Yahoo! Music. The video is abstract in concept. It makes use of the multiple exposure technique: most scenes feature the band members' faces overlapping, rather than showing each of them individually. However, a few scenes do show the band members performing separately. Various miscellaneous objects and people are interspersed in the sequences, while the entire video is set against a glittering blood red and yellow background. This is the second time Pellington is working with the band; he had earlier directed a video for "How to Save a Life" in 2007.

The music video uses the "Radio Remix Version" of the song, which retains the same length but features a slightly different vocal mix on the hook and outro.

== Chart performance ==
"Syndicate" debuted at No. 25 on the Adult Top 40 chart for the week ending January 17, 2010, and peaked at No. 16 on the chart dated April 11, 2010. The song also charted at No. 40 on the Mainstream Top 40 chart, entering the chart the week ending March 13, 2010, and dropping out the following week.

== Charts ==
Chart (2010)	Peak position
US Adult Alternative Airplay (Billboard)	20
US Adult Pop Airplay (Billboard)	16
US Pop Airplay (Billboard)	40

== Release history ==
Release dates and formats for "Syndicate"
Region	Date	Format	Label(s)	Ref.
United States	January 12, 2010	Mainstream airplay	Epic	
