= My Book (album) =

Studio album by K-Ci
- Released: August 28, 2006
- Genre: Pop
- Label: Bungalo

My Book is the debut solo album of K-Ci Hailey of Jodeci as well as K-Ci & JoJo. Two singles were released off the album called "It's All Love" featuring KansasCali. & “Conversation (Can I Talk 2 U)”

== Reception ==
=== Commercial performance ===
My Book peaked at number 57 on the US Top R&B/Hip-Hop Albums in 2006 (Billboard Albums).

== Track listing ==
1. "My Book (Prelude)"
2. "My Book"
3. "It's All Love" (featuring KansasCali)
4. "Conversation (Can I Talk 2 U)"
5. "Thug by Heart" (featuring Layzie Bone)
6. "Ghetto Woman"
7. "Woman's Gotta Have It"
8. "I Apologize"
9. "Much Too Soon" (featuring Al B. Sure! & Aaron Hall)
10. "What Else Can I Do"
11. "Limousine"
12. "Baby I'm Back"
13. "Soldier"
14. "Cheating on Us"
15. "You"
16. "Care for You"
17. "It's Alright"
18. "It's All Love" [Kazzu Remix] (featuring KansasCali, bonus track)
19. "Conversation" [Dance Remix] (bonus track)

== Charts ==
Chart (2006)	Peak position
US R&B/Hip-Hop Albums (Billboard)	57
