= Billboard Candid Covers =

- Genre: Live Music
- Created by: Billboard
- Country of origin: United States
- Original language: English
- No. of seasons: 3
- No. of episodes: 23

Production
- Running time: 4–8 minutes

Original release
- Release: May 22, 2012 – December 23, 2013

Billboard Candid Covers was an American live music web series created by Billboard, distributed on their website. The series premiered on May 22, 2012. Each Tuesday, artists perform "songs from music stars who helped inspire their careers" Nikon was the presenting sponsor.

One blog called Tristan Prettyman's cover "beautiful". The second season featured Women in Music, and "spotlights emerging female artists performing songs from the female music stars who helped inspire their careers". "We were lifetime fans and she was always an influence," said Tegan & Sara of their Cyndi Lauper cover. The third season premiered with Fifth Harmony.

== Episodes ==
Season	Episodes	Originally released	
Season	Episodes	First released	Last released
1	12	May 22, 2012	August 7, 2012
2	5	November 14, 2012	December 12, 2012
3	6	November 26, 2013	December 23, 2013

=== Season 1 (2012) ===
No. overall	No. in season	Title	Band	Song	Release date
1	1	"Jon McLaughlin Performs Billy Joel's 'Piano Man'"	Jon McLaughlin	Piano Man by Billy Joel	May 22, 2012
2	2	"Cher Lloyd Sings Usher's 'OMG'"	Cher Lloyd	OMG by Usher	May 29, 2012
3	3	"Scars on 45 Sing the Cure's 'Friday I'm in Love'"	Scars on 45	Friday I'm in Love by The Cure	June 5, 2012
4	4	"Delta Rae Sings Fleetwood Mac's 'The Chain'"	Delta Rae	The Chain by Fleetwood Mac	June 12, 2012
5	5	"Yuna Sings Incubus"	Yuna	I Miss You by Incubus	June 19, 2012
6	6	"Ed Sheeran Sings Bob Dylan"	Ed Sheeran	Don't Think Twice, It's All Right by Bob Dylan	June 26, 2012
7	7	"Edens Edge Sings Brad Paisley"	Edens Edge	Whiskey Lullaby by Brad Paisley	July 3, 2012
8	8	"Civil Twilight Sings Beck"	Civil Twilight	The Golden Age by Beck	July 10, 2012
9	9	"Tristan Prettyman Sings 'Wonderwall' by Oasis"	Tristan Prettyman	Wonderwall by Oasis	July 17, 2012
10	10	"The Gaslight Anthem Sings 'House of the Rising Sun'"	The Gaslight Anthem	The House of the Rising Sun by The Animals	July 24, 2012
11	11	"Wynter Gordon Sings Natalie Imbruglia's 'Torn'"	Wynter Gordon	Torn by Natalie Imbruglia	July 31, 2012
12	12	"Melanie Fiona Sings Alanis Morissette"	Melanie Fiona	Ironic by Alanis Morissette	August 7, 2012

=== Season 2 (2012) ===
No. overall	No. in season	Title	Band	Song	Release date
13	1	"Watch Kimbra Sing Nina Simone"	Kimbra	Plain Gold Ring by Nina Simone	November 14, 2012
14	2	"Watch ZZ Ward Sing Etta James"	ZZ Ward	Waiting for Charlie to Come Home by Etta James	November 21, 2012
15	3	"Watch Lianne La Havas Sing Jill Scott"	Lianne La Havas	He Loves Me (Lyzel In E Flat) by Jill Scott	November 28, 2012
16	4	"Cher Lloyd Sings Katy Perry's 'E.T.'"	Cher Lloyd	E.T. by Katy Perry	December 5, 2012
17	5	"Watch Tegan & Sara Sing Cyndi Lauper"	Tegan and Sara	Time After Time by Cyndi Lauper	December 12, 2012

=== Season 3 (2013) ===
No. overall	No. in season	Title	Band	Song	Release date
18	1	"Fifth Harmony Sings Rihanna's 'Stay'"	Fifth Harmony	Stay by Rihanna	November 19, 2013
19	2	"Watch Daughtry Rock Chris Isaak's 'Wicked Game'"	Daughtry	Wicked Game by Chris Isaak	November 26, 2013
20	3	"'The Voice' Star Tony Lucca Sings Bill Withers"	Tony Lucca	Grandma's Hands by Bill Withers	December 4, 2013
21	4	"Watch Mary Lambert Sing Wheatus' 'Teenage Dirtbag'"	Mary Lambert	Teenage Dirtbag by Wheatus	December 12, 2013
22	5	"Tori Kelly Sings P!nk and Paramore"	Tori Kelly	Glitter In The Air by P!nk	December 23, 2013
23	6	"Tori Kelly Sings P!nk and Paramore"	Tori Kelly	The Only Exception by Paramore	December 23, 2013
