= Crash (2004 film) =

Film by Paul Haggis

- Theatrical release poster
- Directed by: Paul Haggis
- Screenplay by: Paul Haggis; Robert Moresco
- Story by: Paul Haggis
- Produced by: Cathy Schulman; Don Cheadle; Bob Yari; Mark R. Harris; Bobby Moresco; Paul Haggis
- Starring: Sandra Bullock; Don Cheadle; Matt Dillon; Jennifer Esposito; William Fichtner; Brendan Fraser; Terrence Howard; Chris "Ludacris" Bridges; Thandiwe Newton; Ryan Phillippe; Larenz Tate
- Cinematography: J. Michael Muro
- Edited by: Hughes Winborne
- Music by: Mark Isham
- Production companies: Bob Yari Productions; DEJ Productions; Bull's Eye Entertainment; Blackfriars Bridge Productions; Harris Company; ApolloProScreen Productions
- Distributed by: Lions Gate Films (United States); Universum Film (Germany)
- Release dates: September 10, 2004 (TIFF); May 6, 2005 (United States)
- Running time: 112 minutes
- Countries: United States; Germany
- Language: English
- Budget: $6.5 million
- Box office: $98.4 million

Crash is a 2004 American crime drama film directed by Paul Haggis, who co-wrote the screenplay and produced the film with Robert Moresco. A self-described "passion piece" for Haggis, the film features racial and social tensions in Los Angeles and was inspired by a real-life incident in which Haggis's Porsche was carjacked in 1991 outside a video store on Wilshire Boulevard. The film features an ensemble cast, including Sandra Bullock, Don Cheadle, Matt Dillon, Jennifer Esposito, William Fichtner, Brendan Fraser, Terrence Howard, Chris "Ludacris" Bridges, Thandiwe Newton, Michael Peña, Larenz Tate and Ryan Phillippe.

Crash premiered at the 2004 Toronto International Film Festival on September 10, 2004, before it was released in theaters on May 6, 2005, by Lions Gate Films. The film received generally positive reviews from critics, who praised the direction and performances (particularly Dillon's) but criticized the portrayal of race relations as simplistic and unsubtle. The film was a success at the box office, earning $98.4 million worldwide against its $6.5 million budget.

The film earned several accolades and nominations. Dillon received nominations for Best Supporting Actor from the Academy Awards, BAFTA, Golden Globe, and Screen Actors Guild. Additionally, the cast won the Screen Actors Guild Award for Outstanding Performance by a Cast in a Motion Picture. The film received six Academy Award nominations and won three: Best Picture, Best Original Screenplay, and Best Film Editing, at the 78th Academy Awards. It was also nominated for nine BAFTA Awards and won two, for Best Original Screenplay and Best Supporting Actress for Newton.

== Plot ==
Los Angeles Detective Graham Waters and his partner, Ria, are involved in a minor car collision with Kim Lee. Ria and Kim Lee exchange racially charged insults. Later, Waters arrives at a crime scene, where he discovers an unidentified corpse.

48 hours earlier, Anthony and Peter, two young Black men, carjack district attorney Rick Cabot and his wife Jean. While driving, Peter places a figurine of St. Christopher on the dashboard. They pass by Waters and Ria, who are investigating a homicide in a San Fernando Valley parking lot. The pair learn that a White undercover cop, Detective Conklin, shot a Black undercover cop, Detective Lewis, unaware that the other was a policeman. At home, Cabot says the carjacking incident could cost him re-election, believing that he will lose either the Black vote or the law and order vote. Hispanic locksmith Daniel Ruiz overhears Jean, who suspects that Daniel is a gangster, demanding that the locks be changed again.

While searching for the Cabots' stolen vehicle, Sergeant John Ryan pulls over an SUV driven by a wealthy Black couple, TV director Cameron Thayer and his wife, Christine. Ryan performs a body search on Christine and molests her in front of Cameron. Ryan's younger partner, Officer Tom Hansen, looks on in horror but does not intervene. Hansen reports Ryan's conduct to Lieutenant Dixon and requests a transfer. Dixon, a Black man, tells Hansen that a racism complaint would hurt his own career and allows the transfer in exchange for silence on Ryan's conduct. Ryan, who lives with his ill father, takes his frustration out on the Black HMO administrator he speaks with over the phone.

Anthony and Peter accidentally hit an Asian man while driving and drop him off at a hospital. Meanwhile, Waters visits his mother, who asks him to find his missing younger brother. Ryan again encounters Christine, who had gotten into another car crash. Recognizing Ryan, Christine frantically resists his assistance. He manages to pull her out of the car just before it is engulfed in flames. As Christine is being helped by paramedics, she stares at Ryan. Waters is summoned to a meeting with DA worker Flanagan, who tells Waters that Internal Affairs wants Conklin imprisoned. Waters has evidence incriminating Lewis, but Flanagan promises Waters a promotion and the expungement of his brother's criminal record. At a press conference, Waters reluctantly confirms that the homicide was racially motivated.

Anthony and Peter unsuccessfully carjack Cameron's car, and Peter flees the scene before the police arrive. Cameron and Anthony drive away and are chased by police, including Hansen. When police catch the SUV, Hansen recognizes Cameron, and out of remorse for the earlier traffic stop, he vouches for Cameron to be let off with a warning. Anthony, who was hiding during the exchange, is dropped off at a bus stop by Cameron. Later that night, Hansen picks up a hitchhiking Peter. Peter reaches into his pocket, and Hansen, thinking he is reaching for a gun, shoots him. Peter, who was actually reaching for his statuette, dies. Hansen hides the body and burns his car. Waters and Ria later arrive at the scene, revealing that the dead body is Waters's brother Peter. Waters's mother disowns him over Peter's death.

Anthony comes across a white van and takes it to a chop shop, where they discover chained Cambodian immigrants. It is discovered that the van had belonged to Kim Lee and her husband, the man that Anthony and Peter had hit. The chop shop owner offers Anthony $500 per immigrant, but Anthony refuses. Anthony drives the immigrants to Chinatown and frees them. He passes by a fender-bender. One driver is the insurance adjuster Ryan had previously argued with, and the other is an Asian man. An exchange of racially charged insults erupts between the drivers.

== Cast ==
- Don Cheadle as Detective Graham Waters, a black officer investigating recent murders based on racial tensions
- Sandra Bullock as Jean Cabot, Rick's wife
- Matt Dillon as Sergeant John Ryan, a bigoted police officer
- Jennifer Esposito as Ria, Graham's Hispanic partner
- Brendan Fraser as District Attorney Rick Cabot, Jean's husband
- Terrence Howard as Cameron Thayer, a television director and Christine's husband
- Chris "Ludacris" Bridges as Anthony, a violent carjacker and Peter's partner
- Thandiwe Newton (credited as Thandie Newton) as Christine Thayer, Cameron's wife
- Michael Peña as Daniel Ruiz, a Hispanic locksmith
- Ryan Phillippe as Officer Tom Hansen, a rookie policeman and Ryan's partner
- Larenz Tate as Peter, a laid back carjacker, and Anthony's partner
- Shaun Toub as Farhad, a Persian shop owner
- Bahar Soomekh as Dorri, Farhad's daughter
- Ashlyn Sanchez as Lara Ruiz, Daniel's daughter
- Karina Arroyave as Elizabeth Ruiz, Daniel's wife
- Loretta Devine as Shaniqua Johnson, a HMO administrator
- Beverly Todd as Mrs. Waters
- William Fichtner as Jake Flanagan, Rick's campaign manager
- Keith David as Lieutenant Dixon, Tom's superior officer
- Jack McGee as Gun Store Owner
- Greg Joung Paik as Choi Chin Gui, a human trafficker
- Alexis Rhee as Kim Lee, Choi Chin Gui's wife
- Daniel Dae Kim as Park
- Nona Gaye as Karen
- Bruce Kirby as "Pop" Ryan
- Tony Danza as Fred
- Kathleen York as Officer Johnson
- Sylva Kelegian as Nurse Hodges
- Marina Sirtis as Shereen, Farhad's wife

== Production ==
=== Development ===
Writer and director Paul Haggis was inspired to make the film after being carjacked by two African-American men at a Blockbuster Video on Wilshire Boulevard while driving home from the premiere of The Silence of the Lambs in February 1991. Afterwards he began thinking more about the impact of race, ethnicity, and class in American society. He later stated that he wrote Crash not simply to criticize racists but to "bust liberals" for the idea that the United States had become a post-racial society. Haggis cowrote the first draft of Crash with Robert Moresco in 2001 after being fired from Family Law.

=== Casting ===
Haggis initially tried to sell the script to television producers before it gained the attention of producers Cathy Schulman and Bob Yari. Yari offered Haggis $7.5 million to produce the script as a film, on the condition he could assemble an ensemble cast of major stars. Don Cheadle was the first actor to be cast and also came on board as a producer, which helped attract other big names to the production. Forest Whitaker was originally attached to play Terrence Howard's role but dropped out. The casting of Brendan Fraser as the district attorney, which came last, was pivotal in getting the film green-lit.

Heath Ledger and John Cusack were also attached to the roles of Tom Hansen and John Ryan, respectively, but dropped out after production delays. At one point, Don Cheadle also considered leaving the production to perform in Hotel Rwanda. According to Yari, the departure of Ledger from the cast reduced the film's international value and the budget was brought down by $1 million.

=== Filming ===
Filming began in Los Angeles for a 32-day shoot on December 8th 2003 and concluded on January 31st 2004. Haggis made up for the reduced budget by taking out three mortgages on his house, cutting back on exterior shots, and reusing locations. Principal cast members also agreed to pay cuts and deferred their salaries. Production was delayed for a week when Haggis had a heart attack while filming a scene, although he defied medical advice to hire a new director.

In a 2020 interview with Vulture, Thandiwe Newton stated that Haggis ensured she was wearing special protective underwear for the police sexual assault scene, because he wanted it to look "real" from the camera's perspective for Matt Dillon "to go there".

=== Music ===
The original score was released by Superb Records through Lions Gate Films in 2005. All songs were written and composed by Mark Isham, except where noted. The iTunes release is the complete score released through Yari Music Group, and has the cues isolated and in film order (unlike the commercial score CD which is edited, incomplete, in a different order, and in suite form). A second volume of tracks, titled Crash: Music from and Inspired by the Film, was released featuring songs that appear in the film.

== Release ==
=== Box office ===
After a rough cut was shown at 2004 Toronto International Film Festival, the film premiered at the Elgin Theatre in Toronto in September 2004. It was quickly purchased by Lions Gate Films for $3.5 million. Crash had a wide release on May 6, 2005, and was a box office success in the late spring of 2005.

The film grossed $53.4 million domestically, making back more than seven times its estimated $6.5 million-budget. Despite its success in relation to its cost, Crash was the lowest-grossing film at the domestic box office to win Best Picture since The Last Emperor in 1987.

=== Home media ===
Crash was released on VHS & DVD on September 6, 2005, in widescreen and fullscreen one-disc versions. Bonus features included a music video by KansasCali (now known as the Rocturnals) for the song "If I..." from the soundtrack. The director's cut of the film was released in a two-disc special edition DVD on April 4, 2006, with more bonus content than the one-disc set. The director's cut is three minutes longer than the theatrical cut. The scene where Daniel is talking with his daughter under her bed is extended and a new scene is added with officer Hansen in the police station locker room.

Crash was the first Best Picture winner to be released on Blu-ray Disc in the US, on June 27, 2006.

== Critical response and legacy ==
=== Initial ===
On review aggregator website Rotten Tomatoes, the film has an approval rating of 73% based on 240 reviews, with an average score of 7.2/10. The site's critical consensus reads, "A raw and unsettling morality piece on modern angst and urban disconnect, Crash examines the dangers of bigotry and xenophobia in the lives of interconnected Angelenos." On Metacritic, the film has a score of 66 out of 100, based on 36 critics, indicating "generally favorable" reviews. Audiences polled by CinemaScore gave the film a grade of "A−" on an A+ to F scale.

Roger Ebert gave the film four out of four stars and described it as "a movie of intense fascination", listing it as the best film of 2005. Ebert concluded his review with the sentiment "not many films have the possibility of making their audiences better people. I don't expect Crash to work any miracles, but I believe anyone seeing it is likely to be moved to have a little more sympathy for people not like themselves." Steve Davis of the Austin Chronicle called it the "most compelling American movie to come around in a long time" and said it succeeds in inviting audiences to make preconceived notions about the characters and then complicates those notions. Ella Taylor of LA Weekly described it as "not just one of the best Hollywood movies about race, but along with Collateral, one of the finest portrayals of contemporary LA life period."

The performances of Dillon, Cheadle, Bridges, Peña, Newton, and Howard were singled out. Todd McCarthy of Variety wrote, "Specific scenes, especially those involving Dillon as the racially resentful cop who, like everyone else, has his reasons, bristle with tension as the character continuously pushes past conventional limits in abusing his authority and, redeemingly, in his display of uncommon valor." Peter Bradshaw of the Guardian gave the film three out of five stars, writing, "Crash is a very watchable and well-constructed piece of work...but its daringly supercharged fantasies of racial paranoia and humanist redemption are not to be taken too seriously." Joanne Kaufman of the Wall Street Journal opined, "Ultimately, Crash succeeds in spite of itself," noting that at a certain point, it "starts to feel obvious and schematic" but remains "a complex blend of compassion and sorrow".

The film's plot elements, such as the means through which all the characters are connected, were derided by critics as contrived and unconvincing. Ty Burr of the Boston Globe wrote that the film "is one of those multi-character, something-is-rotten-in-Los Angeles barnburners that grab you by the lapels and try desperately to shake you up. It's more artful than Grand Canyon, less artsy than Magnolia (LA gets dusted with snow instead of frogs), and much less of a mess than Falling Down." Burr lamented how "its characters come straight from the assembly line of screenwriting archetypes, and too often they act in ways that archetypes, rather than human beings, do. You can feel its creator shuttling them here and there on the grid of greater LA, pausing portentously between each move."

Another criticism centered on the storytelling as didactic and heavy-handed. Writing for Slate, David Edelstein commented Crash "might even have been a landmark film about race relations had its aura of blunt realism not been dispelled by a toxic cloud of dramaturgical pixie dust." Others noted how the film had nothing new or insightful to say on racism, with Stephanie Zacharek of Salon writing that Crash "only confirms what we already know about racism: It's inside every one of us. That should be a starting point, not a startling revelation." A.O. Scott of the New York Times described it as "a frustrating movie: full of heart and devoid of life; crudely manipulative when it tries hardest to be subtle; and profoundly complacent in spite of its intention to unsettle and disturb."

Much criticism focused on how the film presents racism and its origins, with many noting its depiction of race relations as too simplistic and tidy. The redemption arcs of the white characters, particularly Sergeant Ryan, drew controversy for their execution. Many opined that Ryan's redemption by way of his heroic rescue of Christine felt unearned.

=== Retrospective ===
In the years since the film's release, criticism and debate about the film have grown alongside ongoing cultural dialogues about race and social movements in the United States. In 2009, cultural critic Ta-Nehisi Coates criticized the film as shallow and "unthinking", naming Crash "the worst film of the decade". The film has been described as using multicultural and sentimentalist imagery to cover over material and "historically sedimented inequalities" that continue to affect various racial groups in Los Angeles.

In a retrospective review, Tim Grierson of The New Republic opined, "Haggis has characters hurl nasty epithets at one another, as if that's the most corrosive aspect of discrimination, failing to acknowledge that what's most destructive aren't the shouts but, rather, the whispers—the private jokes and long-held prejudices shared by likeminded people behind closed doors and far from public view." The film was also criticized for depicting the Persian shopkeeper as a "deranged, paranoid individual who is only redeemed by what he believes is a mystical act of God".

The film ranked at #460 in Empire's 2008 poll of the "500 Greatest Films of All Time".

In 2010, the Independent Film & Television Alliance selected Crash as one of the 30 Most Significant Independent Films of the last 30 years.

In a retrospective piece for The Guardian in 2025, commemorating the film's twentieth anniversary, critic Scott Tobias said of Crash: "it has one big, fat theme and orchestrates every moment to serve it, like a grade-school essay that jams a few paragraphs of supporting evidence to support the thesis that is offered in the first paragraph and repeated in the last. There's no room in there for how actual humans might behave."

=== Top 10 lists ===
Crash was listed on many critics' top 10 lists.

- 1st – Roger Ebert, Chicago Sun-Times
- 1st – Steve Davis, Austin Chronicle
- 3rd – Kevin Thomas, Los Angeles Times
- 3rd – Richard Roeper, Ebert & Roeper
- 3rd – Ella Taylor, L.A. Weekly
- 4th – Stephen Hunter, The Washington Post
- 6th – Christy Lemire, Associated Press
- 7th – Claudia Puig, USA Today
- 8th – Richard Schickel, Time
- 8th – Lisa Schwarzbaum, Entertainment Weekly
- 9th – Peter Travers, Rolling Stone

=== Oscar controversy ===
At the 78th Academy Awards, Crash won the Oscar for Best Picture, triumphing over the heavily favored Brokeback Mountain in what is considered as one of the most notable Oscars upsets. After announcing the award, presenter Jack Nicholson was caught on camera mouthing the word "whoa" out of apparent surprise at the result. The film's use of moral quandary as a storytelling medium was widely reported as ironic since many saw it as the "safe" alternative to Brokeback Mountain, which is about a gay relationship (the other nominees, Good Night, and Good Luck, Capote, and Munich also tackle heavy subjects of McCarthyism, homosexuality, and terrorism). Critic Kenneth Turan suggested that Crash benefited from homophobia among Academy members, some of whom openly voiced their discomfort with Brokeback Mountain due to its subject matter. After the Oscars telecast, critic Roger Ebert insisted in his column that the better film won the award.

Film Comment magazine placed Crash first on its list of "Worst Winners of Best Picture Oscars", followed by Slumdog Millionaire at #2 and Chicago at #3. Similarly, a 2014 survey of film critics by The Atlantic identified the film's victory as among the most glaring mistakes made by the Academy Awards. In 2017, David Ehrlich and Eric Kohn of IndieWire ranked Crash as the worst on its list of "Best Picture Winners of the 21st Century, Ranked from Worst to Best".

In 2015, The Hollywood Reporter polled hundreds of Academy members, asking them to re-vote on past controversial decisions. For the 2005 Best Picture winner, Brokeback Mountain beat Crash and the other nominees.

In a 2015 interview, Haggis commented, "Was [Crash] the best film of the year? I don't think so. There were great films that year. Good Night, and Good Luck – amazing film. Capote – terrific film. Ang Lee's Brokeback Mountain, great film. And Spielberg's Munich. I mean please, what a year. Crash, for some reason, affected people, it touched people. And you can't judge these films like that. I'm very glad to have those Oscars. They're lovely things. But you shouldn't ask me what the best film of the year was because I wouldn't be voting for Crash, only because I saw the artistry that was in the other films. Now however, for some reason that's the film that touched people the most that year. So I guess that's what they voted for, something that really touched them. And I'm very proud of the fact that Crash does touch you. People still come up to me more than any of my films and say: 'That film just changed my life.' I've heard that dozens and dozens and dozens of times. So it did its job there. I mean, I knew it was the social experiment that I wanted, so I think it's a really good social experiment. Is it a great film? I don't know."

In a 2020 retrospective about the film and its Oscars win, K. Austin Collins of Vanity Fair wrote the film "is a throwback to a familiar strain of Oscar-friendly, liberal message movie—in which the 'message,' often, is that people are complicated, goodness is relative, and evil is not a terminal condition. It dramatizes racism the same way that classical Hollywood storytelling has long dramatized things: through a sense of character and intention and a guise of psychological realism, through arcs and archetypes, through a slow climb toward third-act revelations about who people really are as evinced by the things they've achieved, the changes they've undergone by film's end."

In February 2024, David Fear of Rolling Stone ranked Crash as the worst Best Picture Oscar winner of the 21st century, criticizing what he described as the movie's heavy-handed symbolism and its various caricatures. Fear concluded his commentary by stating, “We have a feeling that were we to revisit this list in the year 2050, Crash would still occupy this same slot.”

=== Accolades ===
Crash received several awards and nominations, and was named one of the top 10 films of the year by both the American Film Institute and the National Board of Review. The film was nominated for six awards at the 78th Academy Awards and won three, for Best Picture, Best Original Screenplay, and Best Film Editing. It was also nominated for nine British Academy Film Awards and won two, for Best Original Screenplay and Best Supporting Actress for Newton. Dillon received nominations for best supporting actor at the Academy Awards, British Academy Film Awards, Golden Globe Awards, and Screen Actors Guild Awards for his performance. Additionally, the cast won the Screen Actors Guild Award for Outstanding Performance by a Cast in a Motion Picture, and Harris and Moresco won the Writers Guild of America Award for Best Original Screenplay.

== Television series ==
A 13-episode series premiered on the Starz network on October 17, 2008. The series features Dennis Hopper as a record producer in Los Angeles, California, and examines how his life is connected to other characters in the city, including a police officer (Ross McCall) and his partner, an actress-turned-police officer (Arlene Tur). The cast consists of a Brentwood mother (Clare Carey), her real-estate developer husband (D. B. Sweeney), a former gang member-turned-EMT (Brian Tee), a street-smart driver (Jocko Sims), an undocumented Guatemalan immigrant (Luis Chavez), and a detective (Nick Tarabay).

== See also ==
- Grand Canyon (1991 film)
- Magnolia (1999 film)
