= James Albert Jackson =

- Born: James Albert Jackson Sr. June 20, 1878; Bellefonte, Pennsylvania, U.S.
- Died: November 15, 1960 (aged 82); U.S.
- Occupations: Columnist, writer
- Writing career
- Language: English

James Albert Jackson Sr. (June 20, 1878 – November 15, 1960) was a columnist for Billboard. He wrote about black performers.

He was born in Bellefonte, Pennsylvania. A historical marker on East High Street commemorates his life.

He married Gabrielle Hill and they had a son named James Albert Jackson Jr.

He lived at 312 Manhattan Avenue. Later in his career he worked for the Esso oil company, who sponsored The Green Book with advertisements.

Phi Beta Sigma has an entrepreneur sponsorship program named for Jackson.

== See also ==
- Harlem Renaissance
