= Billboard Mashup Mondays =

- Genre: Live Music
- Created by: Billboard
- Country of origin: United States
- Original language: English
- No. of seasons: 2
- No. of episodes: 70

Production
- Running time: 4–8 minutes

Original release
- Release: February 22, 2010 – November 7, 2011

Billboard Mashup Mondays was an American live music web series created by Billboard, distributed on their website. The series premiered on February 22, 2010. Each Monday, "artists cover unexpected songs" Starburst was the presenting sponsor. At the end of the second season, there was an online vote for the favorite video, followed by a "post-season" of five episodes.

One reviewer said "some weeks we get inspired performances like Janelle Monae singing “Smile”, and other weeks we get Iyaz turning Green Day into bad karaoke".

== Episodes ==
Season	Episodes	Originally released	
Season	Episodes	First released	Last released
1	32	February 22, 2010	October 4, 2010
2	38	February 7, 2011	November 7, 2011

=== Season 1 (2010) ===
No. overall	No. in season	Title	Band	Song	Release date
1	1	"We The Kings Take On Lady Gaga's "Paparazzi""	We The Kings	Paparazzi by Lady Gaga	February 22, 2010
2	2	"Jay Sean Flips The Script"	Jay Sean	The Man Who Can't Be Moved by The Script	March 1, 2010
3	3	"Diane Birch De-Clubs "What Is Love""	Diane Birch	What Is Love by Haddaway	March 8, 2010
4	4	"Jason Castro Goes 'Crazy'"	Jason Castro	Crazy by Gnarls Barkley	March 15, 2010
5	5	"Iyaz Sweetens Up Green Day"	Iyaz	21 Guns by Green Day	March 22, 2010
6	6	"Matisyahu Beatboxes Kings Of Leon"	Matisyahu	Use Somebody by Kings of Leon	March 29, 2010
7	7	"Sam Adams Spins Sublime"	Sam Adams	What I Got by Sublime	April 5, 2010
8	8	"Florence + The Machine Makes Over Mario Winans"	Florence + The Machine	I Don't Wanna Know by Mario Winans	April 12, 2010
9	9	"Kevin Rudolf Mellows Out Lifehouse"	Kevin Rudolf	Halfway Gone by Lifehouse	April 19, 2010
10	10	"Kid Sister Gets "More Than" Extreme"	Kid Sister	More Than Words by Extreme	April 26, 2010
11	11	"Josh Rouse Tames The Cult"	Josh Rouse	Wild Flower by The Cult	May 3, 2010
12	12	"Melanie Fiona Dusts Off Sam Cooke"	Melanie Fiona	Cupid by Sam Cooke	May 10, 2010
13	13	"Jason Derulo Revamps Kanye's "Heartless""	Jason Derulo	Heartless by Kanye West	May 17, 2010
14	14	"We Are The Fallen Tries Out U2"	We Are the Fallen	With or Without You by U2	May 24, 2010
15	15	"Jewel Puts A Shine On Neil Young"	Jewel	The Needle and the Damage Done by Neil Young	June 7, 2010
16	16	"Neon Trees Doo Wop Justin Bieber"	Neon Trees	Baby by Justin Bieber	June 14, 2010
17	17	"Janelle Monáe Makes MJ Fave By Charlie Chaplin "Smile""	Janelle Monáe	Smile by Charlie Chaplin	June 21, 2010
18	18	"Charice Goes Country"	Charice	You're Still the One by Shania Twain	June 28, 2010
19	19	"Esmée Denters Sings Stevie Wonder"	Esmée Denters	As by Stevie Wonder	July 5, 2010
20	20	"Nikki & Rich Put Soul Into Muse's "Uprising""	Nikki & Rich	Uprising by Muse	July 12, 2010
21	21	"Burnham Looks On The Killers' "Brightside""	Burnham	Mr. Brightside by The Killers	July 26, 2010
22	22	"Dirty Heads Paint It 'Black'"	Dirty Heads	Paint It Black by The Rolling Stones	August 2, 2010
23	23	"Sara Bareilles Switches Up 'Single Ladies'"	Sara Bareilles	Single Ladies (Put a Ring on It) by Beyoncé	August 9, 2010
24	24	"The Maine Reels In Outkast"	The Maine	Roses by Outkast	August 16, 2010
25	25	"Never Shout Never Sings Dylan"	Never Shout Never	It Ain't Me Babe by Bob Dylan	August 23, 2010
26	26	"Lights Looks "Behind Blue Eyes""	Lights	Behind Blue Eyes by The Who	August 30, 2010
27	27	"David Gray Goes Country"	David Gray	Long Black Veil by Lefty Frizzell	September 6, 2010
28	28	"Cody Simpson 'Steal's A Ben Harper Tune"	Cody Simpson	Steal My Kisses by Ben Harper	September 13, 2010
29	29	"Hey Monday Get Into Jason Derulo's "Head""	Hey Monday	In My Head by Jason Derulo	September 20, 2010
30	30	"Ryan Star Bows Down To Nine Inch Nails"	Ryan Star	Head Like a Hole by Nine Inch Nails	September 27, 2010
31	31	"Chiddy Bang Get "Happy""	Chiddy Bang	Don't Worry, Be Happy by Bobby McFerrin	October 4, 2010
32	32	"Marina & The Diamonds Put A Shine On 3OH!3"	Marina & The Diamonds	Starstrukk by 3OH!3	October 4, 2010

=== Season 2 (2011) ===
No. overall	No. in season	Title	Band	Song	Release date
33	0	"April Smith Puts A Speakeasy Spin On Trey Songz"	April Smith and the Great Picture Show	Bottoms Up by Trey Songz	February 7, 2011
34	1	"Greyson Chance Is In An 'Empire State Of Mind'"	Greyson Chance	Empire State Of Mind by Jay-Z	February 14, 2011
35	2	"The Downtown Fiction Gets "Ironic""	The Downtown Fiction	Ironic by Alanis Morissette	February 21, 2011
36	3	"The Rural Alberta Advantage Unplugs ABBA"	The Rural Alberta Advantage	SOS by ABBA	February 28, 2011
37	4	"K. Flay Reawakens The Zombies"	K.Flay	Time of the Season by The Zombies	March 7, 2011
38	5	"Oh Land Gets Dreamy With Fleet Foxes"	Oh Land	White Winter Hymnal by Fleet Foxes	March 14, 2011
39	6	"Katie Costello Keys Up Weezer"	Katie Costello	Island In The Sun by Weezer	March 21, 2011
40	7	"Miguel Gets a "Hold" on Britney Spears"	Miguel	Hold It Against Me by Britney Spears	March 28, 2011
41	8	"Plain White T's 'Forget' Cee Lo Green, April 04, 2011"	Plain White T's	Forget You by Cee Lo Green	April 4, 2011
42	9	"The Duke Spirit Remakes Robyn"	The Duke Spirit	Dancing On My Own by Robyn	April 11, 2011
43	10	"Dom Does Lady Gaga's 'Alejandro'"	Dom	Alejandro by Lady Gaga	April 18, 2011
44	11	"Grace Potter Belts Out Beyonce"	Grace Potter and the Nocturnals	Why Don't You Love Me by Beyoncé	April 25, 2011
45	12	"Hooray For Earth Turns On Kanye West's 'All Of The Lights'"	Hooray for Earth	All of the Lights by Kanye West	May 2, 2011
46	13	"Augustana 'Dreams' Up Fleetwood Mac"	Augustana	Dreams by Fleetwood Mac	May 9, 2011
47	14	"Mary Mary Covers Bruno Mars"	Mary Mary	Just The Way You Are by Bruno Mars	May 16, 2011
48	15	"Bilal Rocks 'Tainted Love'"	Bilal	Tainted Love by Gloria Jones/Soft Cell	May 23, 2011
49	16	"Gomez's Ben Ottewell Covers Rihanna"	Ben Ottewell	Only Girl (In the World) by Rihanna	May 30, 2011
50	17	"The Ready Set Cover The Wallflowers' "One Headlight""	The Ready Set	One Headlight by The Wallflowers	June 6, 2011
51	18	"Sarah Jaffe Folks Up Robyn"	Sarah Jaffe	Hang With Me by Robyn	June 13, 2011
52	19	"Jeremih Strips Adele's 'Rumour' Down"	Jeremih	Rumour Has It by Adele	June 20, 2011
53	20	"Yellowcard Has Its Way With Katy Perry's 'E.T.'"	Yellowcard	E.T. by Katy Perry	June 27, 2011
54	21	"James Blunt Warms Up To 'California Gurls', July 04, 2011"	James Blunt	California Gurls by Katy Perry	July 4, 2011
55	22	"Jason Reeves Folks Up Nicki Minaj"	Jason Reeves	Moment 4 Life by Nicki Minaj	July 11, 2011
56	23	"The Wombats Rock Jessie J"	The Wombats	Price Tag by Jessie J	July 18, 2011
57	24	"Vanessa Carlton Explores Mumford & Sons' "Cave""	Vanessa Carlton	The Cave by Mumford & Sons	July 25, 2011
58	25	"Wonder Girls Cover B.o.B / Bruno Mars"	Wonder Girls	Nothin' on You by B.o.B	August 1, 2011
59	26	"Taking Back Sunday Strip Down Kanye West"	Taking Back Sunday	Can't Tell Me Nothing by Kanye West	August 8, 2011
60	27	"She Wants Revenge Rolls In Adele's "Deep""	She Wants Revenge	Rolling in the Deep by Adele	August 15, 2011
61	28	"Ashlyne Huff Covers Paramore's 'Exception', Aug 22, 2011"	Ashlyne Huff	The Only Exception by Paramore	August 22, 2011
62	29	"The Summer Set Goes Country With Blake Shelton's Honey Bee"	The Summer Set	Honey Bee by Blake Shelton	August 29, 2011
63	30	"Hanson Gets Sweet With Weezer's 'Troublemaker'"	Hanson	Troublemaker by Weezer	September 5, 2011
64	31	"Shinobi Ninja Rocks Boyz II Men"	Shinobi Ninja	Water Runs Dry by Boyz II Men	September 12, 2011
65	32	"Parachute Rocks Keri Hilson's "Girl""	Parachute	Pretty Girl Rock by Keri Hilson	September 19, 2011
66	33	"Patrick Stump Rocks Big Boi's 'Shutterbugg'"	Patrick Stump	Shutterbugg by Big Boi	October 17, 2011
67	34	"Karmin Pumps Up Foster The People's 'Kicks'"	Karmin	Pumped Up Kicks by Foster the People	October 24, 2011
68	35	"Karmin covers Super Bass"	Karmin	Super Bass by Nicki Minaj	October 24, 2011
69	36	"The Band Perry Turns Queen's 'Fat Bottomed Girls' Country"	The Band Perry	Fat Bottomed Girls by Queen	October 31, 2011
70	37	"Plan B Croons Kanye West's 'Runaway'"	Plan B	Runaway by Kanye West	November 7, 2011
