= Once in a Lifetime: The Extraordinary Story of the New York Cosmos =

- Promotional poster
- Directed by: Paul Crowder; John Dower
- Produced by: John Battsek; Fisher Stevens; Tim Williams
- Starring: Matt Dillon (narrator); Giorgio Chinaglia; Jay Emmett; Clive Toye; Gordon Bradley; Ahmet Ertegun; Raphael de la Sierra; Franz Beckenbauer; Carlos Alberto Torres; Peppe Pinton
- Distributed by: Miramax Films; GreeneStreet Films; ESPN
- Release dates: May 19, 2006 (United Kingdom); July 7, 2006 (United States)
- Running time: 97 minutes
- Language: English

Once in a Lifetime: The Extraordinary Story of the New York Cosmos is a 2006 documentary film about the New York Cosmos, one of the most famous soccer clubs in the history of the United States.

== Overview ==
The movie premiered on July 7, 2006, in New York City. Miramax distributed the film only in limited release. The movie combines the narration of veteran actor Matt Dillon with interviews with many of the team's legendary star players (with the notable exception of Pelé, who demanded a $100,000 fee and refused to participate when the producers declined to pay it) and footage of the team in the North American Soccer League (NASL) in the 1970s and early 1980s.

The film was released in conjunction with a companion piece book, Once in a Lifetime: The Incredible Story of the New York Cosmos (ISBN 0802142885), written by Gavin Newsham and released in 2006.

== Reception ==
On the review aggregator website Rotten Tomatoes, the film holds an 81% approval rating with an average score of 6.9/10 based on 58 reviews.

Several critics gave the film positive reviews.

== Original soundtrack album ==
Once in a Lifetime Original Soundtrack

Soundtrack album by Various artists
- Released: February 9, 2007
- Label: Superb Records

Superb Records released the original soundtrack album the year after the film was released. The soundtrack includes hits from the Motown and Funk genres.

=== Track listing ===
1. Nothing But Soul - Junior Walker and the All Stars
2. Who Is He and What Is He to You? - Creative Source
3. Woman of the Ghetto - Marlena Shaw
4. Strange Games & Things - The Love Unlimited Orchestra
5. Summer Madness - Kool & The Gang
6. I Believe in Miracles - Jackson Sisters
7. He's My Man - The Supremes
8. Machine Gun - Commodores
9. Cross the Tracks (We Better Go Back) - Maceo and The Macks
10. I Feel Love - Donna Summer
11. Disco MF - The Penfifteen Club
12. U Gotta Fight! - KansasCali

== See also ==
- List of association football films
