= KansasCali =

- Origin: Ponce, Puerto Rico/ Chino Hills, California, United States
- Genres: Alternative rock, hip hop
- Years active: 1999–2010
- Labels: Black Casino Music Group, Superb Records
- Members: Aulsondro Hamilton-Mangual ("Novelist"), aka Emcee N.I.C.E. Anderson Johnson ("Pittboss")
- Website: http://www.kansascali.com/

KansasCali is an alternative rock group that was formed in 1999 and composed of rapper Aulsondro "Novelist" Hamilton, also known as Emcee N.I.C.E. and singer Anderson "Pittboss" Johnson originally an R&B/hip hop duo before adding guitarist/drummer Eric "E" Borders.

Both are members of the production team "Da Bookeez", in which they, along with E.Borders, have produced songs both individually and collectively. KansasCali has been featured in Billboard's 2005 Digital Entertainment & Media Awards.

== History ==
The group was founded in Las Vegas, and later relocated to Los Angeles. They subsequently released "If I..." from the soundtrack of the film Crash. Their music video for that appeared in the "Special Features" section of the DVD.

Their work appeared on four more soundtracks, for Mr. & Mrs. Smith, Kickin' It Old Skool, Haven and Once in a Lifetime: The Extraordinary Story of the New York Cosmos.

== Discography ==
=== Album appearances ===
- 2007:
  - TV One's I Don't Want to Be a Star theme song
  - Kickin' It Old Skool (Original Motion Picture Soundtrack)
  - Complicated
- 2006:
  - My Book
  - Haven
- 2005:
  - Hello World
  - "If I..." from the Crash soundtrack Crash: Music from and Inspired by Crash
  - Mr. & Mrs. Smith International Soundtrack
  - Aaron Hall's album Adults Only
- 2004:
  - Food for Thought
  - The Valet, the Bar, the Booth
- 2003:

Appeared on 5 Compilation Records

- 2002:
  - "Thugz Mansion" on 2Pac's Better Dayz (co-producers)
  - "Thugz Mansion" on Nas' God's Son
- 2001:
  - Appeared on AONN Records' November 12 Projekt, track #19 "I Didn't Know"
