= Haven (soundtrack) =

Soundtrack album by Various artists
- Released: 2006
- Label: Superb Records

Haven is the soundtrack album from the 2004 film Haven, starring Orlando Bloom and Zoe Saldaña.

== Track listing ==
=== Disc one ===
1. Move! - Damian "Jr Gong" Marley
2. Melancholy Mood - Ziggy Marley
3. "Clouds" - Neuromance
4. "Just Be" - Collen & Webb
5. "Safe in Mind" (please Get This Gun From Out My Face) - U.N.K.L.E
6. "Heaven" - Lamb
7. "Here Comes the Night" - Native
8. "Latenightman" - Snypah (aka) Junior Ricketts
9. "Uuuh" - KansasCali
10. "Non Stop Traffic" - FOUR
11. "Gotta Change My Life" - Davon from Fragment Crew
12. "Blessed Are the Souls" - Heitor Pereira

=== Disc two ===
1. "We're Safe"
2. "The Feds Arrive"
3. "You've Got a Fax"
4. "We're All Dogs"
5. "Blessed Are the Souls"
6. "Raped Her?"
7. "Carl Talks to Pipa"
8. "The Roundabout"
9. "Lover's Night"
10. "The Red Room"
11. "Just Memories"
12. "Police Station"
13. "Poor Sufferer"
14. "Fritz Nightmare"
15. "The Way Home"
16. "Feds Arrive" (version 1)
17. "Love on the Beach" (version 1)
18. "Busted"
19. "Innocence Lost" (version 1)
20. "Let's Roll" (version 1)
21. "A Good Team"
22. "The Morning After" (version 1)
23. "The Hiding Place"
24. "Shy's Daydream" (version 1)
25. "Schoolyard Fight" (version 1)
26. "Lover's Night" (version 1)
27. "Haven's Theme" (version 1)
