= Billboard Digital Entertainment Awards =

Award for online content

Billboard Digital Entertainment Awards (DECA)
- Awarded for: "Excellence in innovation, entrepreneurship and effective brand development in music, video games, television, film and video"
- First award: 2004; 22 years ago
- Website: www.digitalentertainmentawards.com

The Billboard Digital Entertainment Awards are awards for excellence on the Internet presented annually. Categories include websites, games, music, radio service, Visionary of the Year, and Innovator of the Year.

== Editions ==
=== 2004 ===
2004 was the inaugural event of the Billboard Digital Entertainment Awards (DECA). The awards were handed out in a ceremony at UCLA's Grand Horizon Ballroom on Nov. 5, 2004.

Winners included:

- Visionary of the Year: Steve Jobs, CEO, Apple Inc. / CEO, Pixar
- Visionary of the Year: Max Wright (nominee)
- Innovator of the Year: Hugh Panero and XM Satellite Radio, Inc., XM Radio
- Brand of the Year: Apple Inc.

GAMES

- Game Innovation of the Year: Eyetoy, Dr. Richard Marks and Sony Computer Entertainment America
- PC or Console Game of the Year: "City of Heroes," NCSoft
- Handheld Game of the Year: "Mario & Luigi: Super Star Saga" (GBA), Nintendo
- Web/Downloadable Game of the Year: Shroomz: "Quest for Puppy," Game Trust, Inc.
- Multiplayer Game of the Year: "City of Heroes," NCSoft
- Advergame of the Year: "The Subservient Chicken," Crispin Porter & Bogusky for Burger King
- Game Developer of the Year: BioWare Corp
- Game Developer of the Year: Maxis for The Sims 2 (nominee)
- Best Character in a Game: Link from "Legend of Zelda," Nintendo
- Best Use of Sound in a Game: "True Crime: Streets of LA," Activision

MUSIC

- Digital Music Innovation of the Year: Harmony, Real Networks
- Best Use of Technology by a Music Label: "LL Nation," Island Def Jam
- Best Use of Technology by an Artist: NPG Music Club, Prince
- Best Use of Technology by an Artist: Phone Party, Andrew W.K. (nominee)
- Best Use of Technology for a Music Marketing Campaign: Ben Harper Experience, Maven Networks
- Best Radio Service: XM Satellite Radio
- Best Downloadable or Subscription Music Service: Rhapsody, Real Networks
- Best Digital Music Community: Napster
- Music DVD of the Year: "Rolling Stones Four Flicks," TGA Entertainment

FILM, TELEVISION & VIDEO

- Television Technology of the Year: TiVo
- Best Interactive Television Programming: "NASCAR in Car," NASCAR Digital Entertainment
- Best Use of Technology for Educational Programming: "The Brain," Ball State University – Center for Media Design
- Best Use of Technology in a Feature Film or Film-related Project: "Pirates of the Caribbean: The Curse of the Black Pearl," Walt Disney
- Most Innovative Use of Technology for Advertising: "Master and Commander: The Farside of the World," Maven Networks
- Best Video On-Demand Service: Mag Rack, Rainbow Media
