= Billboard (magazine) =

American weekly music magazine

- November 16, 2019, cover featuring Paul McCartney and highlighting the magazine's 125th anniversary
- Editor: Leila Cobo, Jason Lipshutz
- Former editors: Lee Zhito, Tony Gervino, Bill Werde, Tamara Conniff
- Categories: Entertainment
- Frequency: Weekly
- Publisher: Penske Media Corporation
- Total circulation: 17,000 magazines per week 15.2 million unique visitors per month
- Founder: William Donaldson; James Hennegan
- Founded: November 1, 1894; 132 years ago (as Billboard Advertising)
- Company: Eldridge Industries
- Based in: 770 Broadway; New York, NY 10003; U.S.
- Language: Arabic, English, Korean, Spanish, Portuguese
- Website: billboard.com
- ISSN: 0006-2510
- OCLC: 732913734

Billboard (stylized in lowercase since 2013) is a multinational music and entertainment magazine published weekly by Penske Media Corporation. The publication group and miscellaneous media corporation provides music charts, news, video, opinion, reviews, events and styles related to the music industry. Its music charts include the Hot 100, Billboard 200, and Global 200, which rank the most popular singles and albums across a wide range of genres based on sales, streaming, and radio airplay. It also hosts events, owns a publishing firm and operates several television shows.

Billboard was founded in 1894 by William Donaldson and James Hennegan as a trade publication for bill posters. Donaldson acquired Hennegan's interest in 1900 for $500. In the early years of the 20th century, it covered the entertainment industry, such as circuses, fairs and burlesque shows, and also created a mail service for travelling entertainers. Billboard began focusing more on the music industry as the jukebox, phonograph, and radio became commonplace. Many topics that it covered became the subjects of new magazines, including Amusement Business in 1961 to cover outdoor entertainment, so that Billboard could focus on music. After Donaldson died in 1925, Billboard was inherited by his and Hennegan's children, who retained ownership until selling it to private investors in 1985. The magazine has since been owned by various parties.

== History ==
=== Early history ===
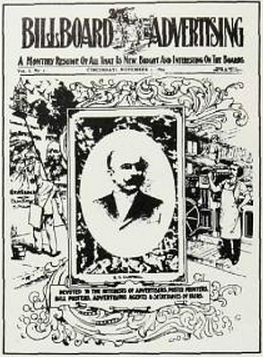
First issue of Billboard (1894)

The first issue of Billboard was published in Cincinnati, Ohio, by William Donaldson and James Hennegan on November 1, 1894. Initially it covered the advertising and bill-posting industry and was known as Billboard Advertising. (Note: Some sources say it was called The Billboard Advertiser) At the time, billboards, posters, and paper advertisements placed in public spaces were the primary means of advertising. Donaldson handled editorial and advertising, while Hennegan, who owned Hennegan Printing Co., managed magazine production. The first issues were just eight pages long. The paper had columns such as The Bill Room Gossip and The Indefatigable and Tireless Industry of the Bill Poster. A department for agricultural fairs was established in 1896. The Billboard Advertising publication was renamed The Billboard in 1897.

After a brief departure over editorial differences, Donaldson purchased Hennegan's interest in the business in 1900 for $500 (equal to $15,900 today) to save it from bankruptcy. On May 5, Donaldson changed the publication from a monthly to a weekly paper with a greater emphasis on breaking news. He improved editorial quality and opened new offices in New York, Chicago, San Francisco, London, and Paris, and also refocused the magazine on outdoor entertainment such as fairs, carnivals, circuses, vaudeville, and burlesque shows. A section devoted to circuses was introduced in 1900, followed by more prominent coverage of outdoor events in 1901. Billboard also covered topics including regulation, professionalism, economics and new shows. It had a "stage gossip" column covering the private lives of entertainers, a "tent show" section covering traveling shows and a subsection called "Freaks to Order". Donaldson also published news articles opposing censorship, supporting productions exhibiting good taste and decrying yellow journalism."

As railroads became more developed, Billboard enabled a mail-forwarding system for traveling entertainers. The location of an entertainer was tracked in the paper's Routes Ahead column, and then Billboard would receive mail on the star's behalf and publish a notice in its Letter-Box column that it had mail for him or her. This service was first introduced in 1904 and became one of Billboard's largest sources of profit and celebrity connections. By 1914, 42,000 people were using the service. It was also used as the official address of traveling entertainers for draft letters during World War I. In the 1960s, when the service was discontinued, Billboard was still processing 1,500 letters per week.

In 1920, Donaldson controversially hired black journalist James Albert Jackson to write a weekly column devoted to black performers. According to The Business of Culture: Strategic Perspectives on Entertainment and Media, the column identified discrimination against black performers and helped validate their careers. Jackson was the first black critic at a national magazine with a predominantly white audience. According to his grandson, Donaldson also established a policy against identifying performers by their race. Donaldson died in 1925.

=== Focus on music ===
Billboard's editorial content changed focus as technology in recording and playback developed, covering "marvels of modern technology" such as the phonograph and wireless radios. The magazine began covering coin-operated entertainment machines in 1899 and created a dedicated section called Amusement Machines in March 1932. Billboard began covering the motion-picture industry in 1907 but, facing strong competition from Variety, centered its focus on music. It created a radio-broadcasting station in the 1920s.

The jukebox industry continued to grow through the Great Depression and was advertised heavily in Billboard, which led to even more editorial focus on music. The proliferation of the phonograph and radio also contributed to its growing music emphasis. Billboard published the first music hit parade on January 4, 1936 and introduced a Record Buying Guide in January 1939. In 1940, it introduced Chart Line, which tracked the best-selling records, and was followed by a chart for jukebox records in 1944 called Music Box Machine. By the 1940s, Billboard was more of a music-industry specialist publication. The number of charts that it published grew after World War II, as new music interests and genres became popular. It had eight charts by 1987, covering different genres and formats, and 28 charts by 1994.

By 1943, Billboard had about 100 employees. The magazine's offices moved to Brighton, Ohio in 1946, then to New York City in 1948. A five-column tabloid format was adopted in November 1950 and coated paper was first used in Billboard's print issues in January 1963, allowing for photojournalism.

Billboard Publications Inc. acquired a monthly trade magazine for candy and cigarette machine vendors called Vend, and in the 1950s it acquired an advertising trade publication called Tide. By 1969, Billboard Publications Inc. owned 11 trade and consumer publications, Watson-Guptill Publications, a set of self-study cassette tapes and four television franchises. It also acquired Photo Weekly that year.

Over time, subjects that Billboard covered outside of the music world formed the basis of separate publications: Funspot magazine was created in 1957 to cover amusement parks and Amusement Business was created in 1961 to cover outdoor entertainment. In January 1961, The Billboard was renamed Billboard Music Week to emphasize its newly exclusive interest in music. Two years later, it was renamed to simply Billboard. According to The New Business Journalism, by 1984, Billboard Publications was a "prosperous" conglomerate of trade magazines, and Billboard had become the "undisputed leader" in music-industry news. In the early 1990s, Billboard introduced Billboard Airplay Monitors, a publication for disc jockeys and music programmers. By the end of the 1990s, Billboard dubbed itself the "bible" of the recording industry.

=== Changes in ownership ===
Billboard struggled after its founder William Donaldson died in 1925, and within three years, was once again heading towards bankruptcy. Donaldson's son-in-law Roger Littleford took command in 1928 and "nursed the publication back to health." His sons Bill and Roger became co-publishers in 1946 and inherited the magazine in the late 1970s after Littleford's death. They sold it to private investors in 1985 for an estimated $40 million. The investors cut costs and acquired a trade publication for the Broadway theatre industry called Backstage.

In 1987, Billboard was sold again to Affiliated Publications for $100 million. Billboard Publications Inc. became a subsidiary of Affiliated Publications called BPI Communications. As BPI Communications, it acquired The Hollywood Reporter, Adweek, Marketing Week and Mediaweek, and also purchased Broadcast Data Systems, a high-tech firm for tracking music airtime. Private investors from Boston Ventures and BPI executives repurchased a two-thirds interest in Billboard Publications for $100 million, and more acquisitions followed. In 1993, it created a division known as Billboard Music Group for music-related publications.

In 1994, Billboard Publications was sold to Dutch media conglomerate Verenigde Nederlandse Uitgeverijen (VNU) for $220 million. (Note: 19 publications according to the Chicago Tribune) VNU acquired the Clio Awards in advertising and the National Research Group in 1997, as well as Editor & Publisher in 1999. In July 2000, it paid $650 million to the publisher Miller Freeman. BPI was combined with other entities in VNU in 2000 to form Bill Communications Inc. By the time CEO Gerald Hobbs retired in 2003, VNU had grown substantially larger, but had a great deal of debt from the acquisitions. An attempted $7 billion acquisition of IMS Health in 2005 prompted protests from shareholders that halted the deal; it eventually agreed to an $11 billion takeover bid from investors in 2006.

VNU changed its name to Nielsen in 2007, the namesake of a company that it had acquired for $2.5 billion in 1999. New CEO Robert Krakoff divested some of the previously owned publications, restructured the organization and planned some acquisitions before dying suddenly in 2007. He was subsequently replaced by Greg Farrar.

Nielsen owned Billboard until 2009, when it was one of eight publications sold to e5 Global Media Holdings. e5 was formed by investment firms Pluribus Capital Management and Guggenheim Partners for the purpose of the acquisition. The following year, the new parent company was renamed Prometheus Global Media. Three years later, Guggenheim Partners acquired Pluribus' share of Prometheus and became the sole owner of Billboard.

In December 2015, Guggenheim Digital Media spun out several media brands, including Billboard, to its own executive Todd Boehly. The assets operate under the Hollywood Reporter-Billboard Media Group, a unit of the holding company Eldridge Industries.

=== 1990s–present ===
Timothy White was appointed editor-in-chief in 1991, a position that he held until his unexpected death in 2002. White wrote a weekly column promoting music with "artistic merit" while criticizing music with violent or misogynistic themes, and also reworked the publication's music charts. Rather than relying on data from music retailers, new charts used data from store checkout scanners obtained by Nielsen SoundScan. White also wrote in-depth profiles on musicians, but was replaced by Keith Girard, who was subsequently fired in May 2004. Girard and a female employee filed a $29 million lawsuit alleging that Billboard fired them unfairly with an intent to damage their reputations and that they experienced sexual harassment, a hostile work environment and a financially motivated lack of editorial integrity. Email evidence suggested that human resources were given special instructions to watch minority employees. The case was settled out of court in 2006 for an undisclosed sum.

In the 2000s, economic decline in the music industry dramatically reduced readership and advertising from Billboard's traditional audience. Circulation declined from 40,000 in the 1990s to less than 17,000 by 2014. The publication's staff and ownership were also undergoing frequent changes.

In 2004, Tamara Conniff became the first female and youngest-ever executive editor at Billboard and led its first major redesign since the 1960s, designed by Daniel Stark and Stark Design. During Conniff's tenure, Billboard's newsstand sales jumped 10%, ad pages climbed 22% and conference registrations rose 76%. In 2005, Billboard expanded its editorial outside the music industry into other areas of digital and mobile entertainment. In 2006, after leading Billboard's radio publication, former ABC News and CNN journalist Scott McKenzie was named editorial director across all Billboard properties. Conniff launched the Billboard Women in Music event in 2007.

Bill Werde was named editorial director in 2008, and was followed by Janice Min in January 2014, also responsible for editorial content at The Hollywood Reporter. The magazine became more of a general-interest music-news source rather than solely an industry trade, covering more celebrity and fashion news. Min hired Tony Gervino as editor although he did not have a background in the music industry. Gervino was appointed editor-in-chief in April 2014. An NPR item covered a leaked version of Billboard's annual survey, which it said had more gossip and focused on less professional topics than had prior surveys. For example, the magazine polled readers on a lawsuit that singer Kesha filed against her producer, alleging sexual abuse.

Gervino was fired in May 2016. A note from Min to the editorial staff indicated that senior vice president of digital content Mike Bruno would head the editorial department. On June 15, 2016, BillboardPH, the first Billboard chart company in Southeast Asia, mainly in the Philippines, was announced. On September 12, 2016, Billboard expanded into China by launching Billboard China in partnership with Vision Music Ltd.

On September 23, 2020, it was announced that Penske Media Corporation would assume operations of the MRC Media & Info publications under a joint venture with MRC known as PMRC. The joint venture includes the management of Billboard.

On January 13, 2024, Billboard shared the intent to expand further in Asia by announcing the launch of Billboard Korea.

== News publishing ==
Billboard publishes a news website and weekly trade magazine that covers music, video and home entertainment. Most of the articles are written by staff writers, while some are written by industry experts. It covers news, gossip, opinion, and music reviews, but its "most enduring and influential creation" is the Billboard charts. The charts track music sales, radio airtime and other data about the most popular songs and albums. The Billboard Hot 100 chart of the top-selling songs was introduced in 1958. Since then, the Billboard 200, which tracks the top-selling albums, has become more popular as an indicator of commercial success. Billboard has also published books in collaboration with Watson-Guptill and a radio and television series called American Top 40, based on Billboard charts. A daily Billboard Bulletin was introduced in February 1997 and Billboard hosts about 20 industry events each year.

Billboard is considered one of the most reputable sources of music industry news. The website includes the Billboard Charts, news separated by music genre, videos and a separate website. It also compiles lists, hosts a fashion website called Pret-a-Reporter and publishes eight different newsletters. The print magazine's regular sections include:

- Hot 100: A chart of the top 100 most popular songs of the week
- Topline: News from the week
- The Beat: Hitmaker interviews, gossip and trends in the music industry
- Style: Fashion and accessories
- Features: In-depth interviews, profiles and photography
- Reviews: Reviews of new albums and songs
- Backstage pass: information about events and concerts
- Charts and CODA: More information about current and historical Billboard Charts

== Listicles ==
Billboard is known for publishing several annual listicles on its website, in recognition of the most influential executives, artists and companies in the music industry, such as the following:

- 21 Under 21
- 40 Under 40
- Women in Music
- Billboard Dance 100
- Billboard Power 100
- Dance Power Players
- Digital Power Players
- Hip-Hop Power Players
- Indie Power Players
- Latin Power Players
- Top 50 Money Makers

== Award shows ==
In 1990, Billboard established the Billboard Music Awards, an awards ceremony which honors the top albums, artists and singles in a number of different music genres, which achieved the highest results during the year from sales, streaming, radio airplay, touring, and social engagement. The data are taken from Billboard and its data partners, including MRC Data and Next Big Sound. Through the years, Billboard has established several other awards and polls to honor different music genres, live performances, and artists.

- Billboard Latin Music Awards (1994–present)
- Billboard R&B/Hip-Hop Awards (2004)
- Billboard Digital Entertainment Awards (2004)
- Billboard Live Music Awards (2004–2019, 2024–present)
- Billboard Women in Music (2007–present)
- Billboard Japan Music Awards (2009–2020)
- Billboard Mid-Year Awards (2011–2015) are a fan-voted poll conducted by the publication to recognize the most popular artists and music based on fan votes, reflecting their preferences during the first half of the year.
- Billboard New Music Polls allow fans to vote for their favorite new music release of the week.

== International editions ==
=== Active ===
- Billboard Arabia (2023–present)
- Billboard Argentina (2013–present)
- Billboard Brasil (2009–2019, 2023–present)
- Billboard Canada (2023–present)
- Billboard China (2016–2019, 2022–present)
- Billboard Colombia (2024–present)
- Billboard España (2024–present)
- Billboard France (2025–present)
- Billboard Georgia (2022–present)
- Billboard Italia (2019–present)
- Billboard Japan (2008–present)
- Billboard Korea (2024–present)
- Billboard Peru (2023–present)
- Billboard Philippines (2016–2018, 2023–present)
- Billboard India (2026–present)

=== Inactive/defunct ===
- Billboard Greece (launched 2011; defunct)
- Billboard Indonesia (launch 2018; defunct)
- Billboard Thailand (launched 2016; defunct)
- Billboard Türkiye (2006–2010)
- Billboard Việt Nam (2017–2023)

== See also ==
- List of Billboard charts
- Billboard Candid Covers
- Billboard K-Town
- Billboard Live Music Awards
- Billboard Mashup Mondays
- Billboard Women in Music
- Heatseekers charts
