= List of Billboard Top Gospel Albums number ones of 2017 =

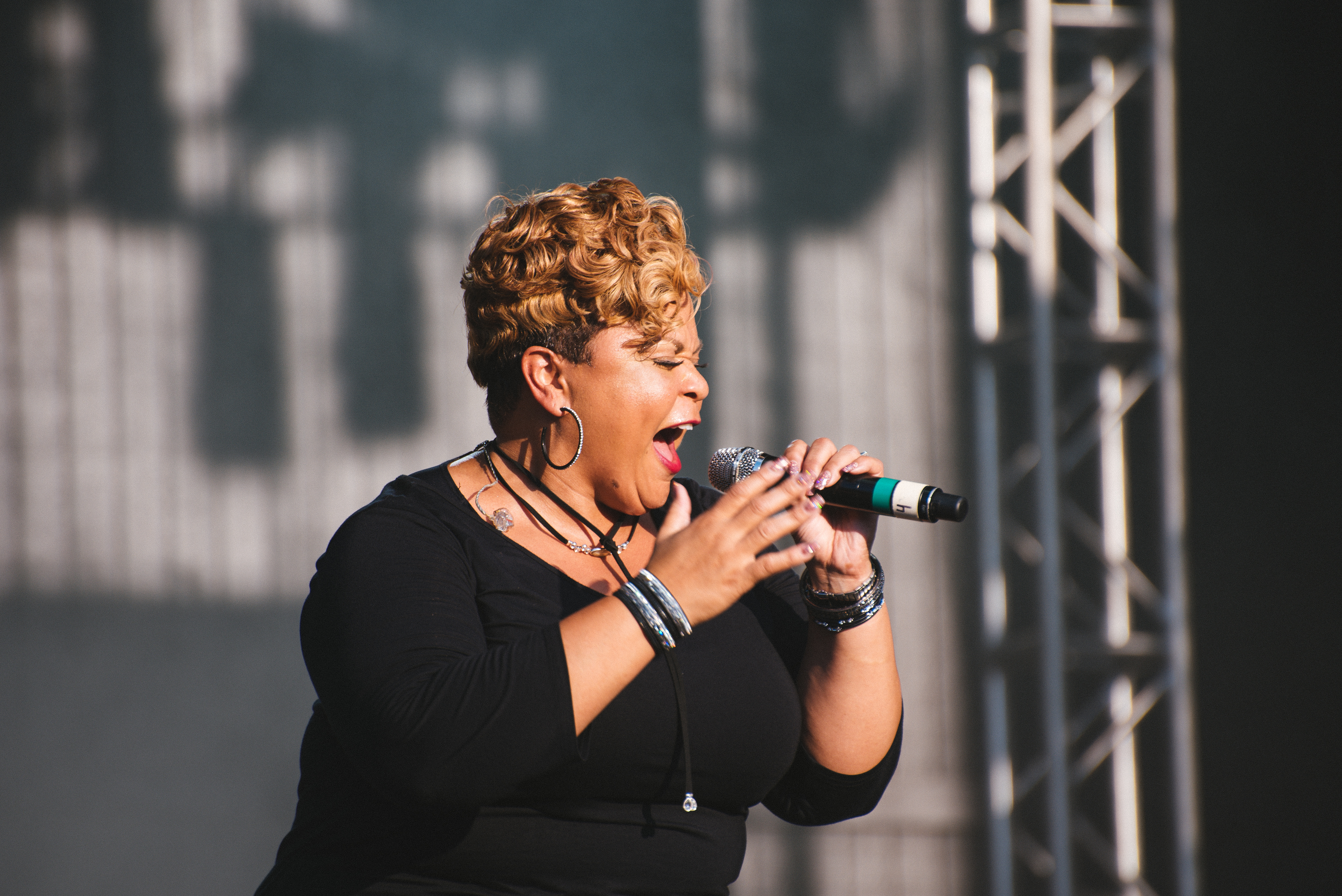
Sat at the top of the Billboard Top Gospel album chart for 11 weeks culminating into year-end #1 album

This is a list of the albums ranked number one Top Gospel Albums in the United States during 2017. The top-performing albums and EPs in the United States for gospel are ranked on the Billboard Top Gospel Albums chart, which is published by Billboard magazine. The data is compiled by Nielsen SoundScan based on each album's weekly physical and digital sales, as well as on-demand streaming and digital sales of their individual tracks.

In 2017, a total of 21 albums claimed the top position of the chart. Beginning with gospel powerhouse Tamela Mann’s One Way, One Way by Tamala Mann was the best-selling Top Gospel album of 2027, spending eleven weeks atop the chart and was the best-performing album on the Billboard Top Gospel Album Year-End chart of 2017 continuing the success of the album from 2016, issue dated January 14th,

In this year, several acts had spent multiple weeks at number-one: Tasha Cobbs Leonard with Heart. Passion. Pursuit, WOW Gospel 2017 both spent eight weeks at top. while Emcee N.I.C.E.’s debut Christian Hip Hop album Praise and James Fortune’s "Dear Future Me" both spent three weeks at the top. Marvin Sapp with Close, Anthony Brown & Group Therapy with "A Long Way from Sunday" and Travis Greene with The Hill Crossover: Live from Music City each spent two weeks at the top of the charts.

== Chart history ==
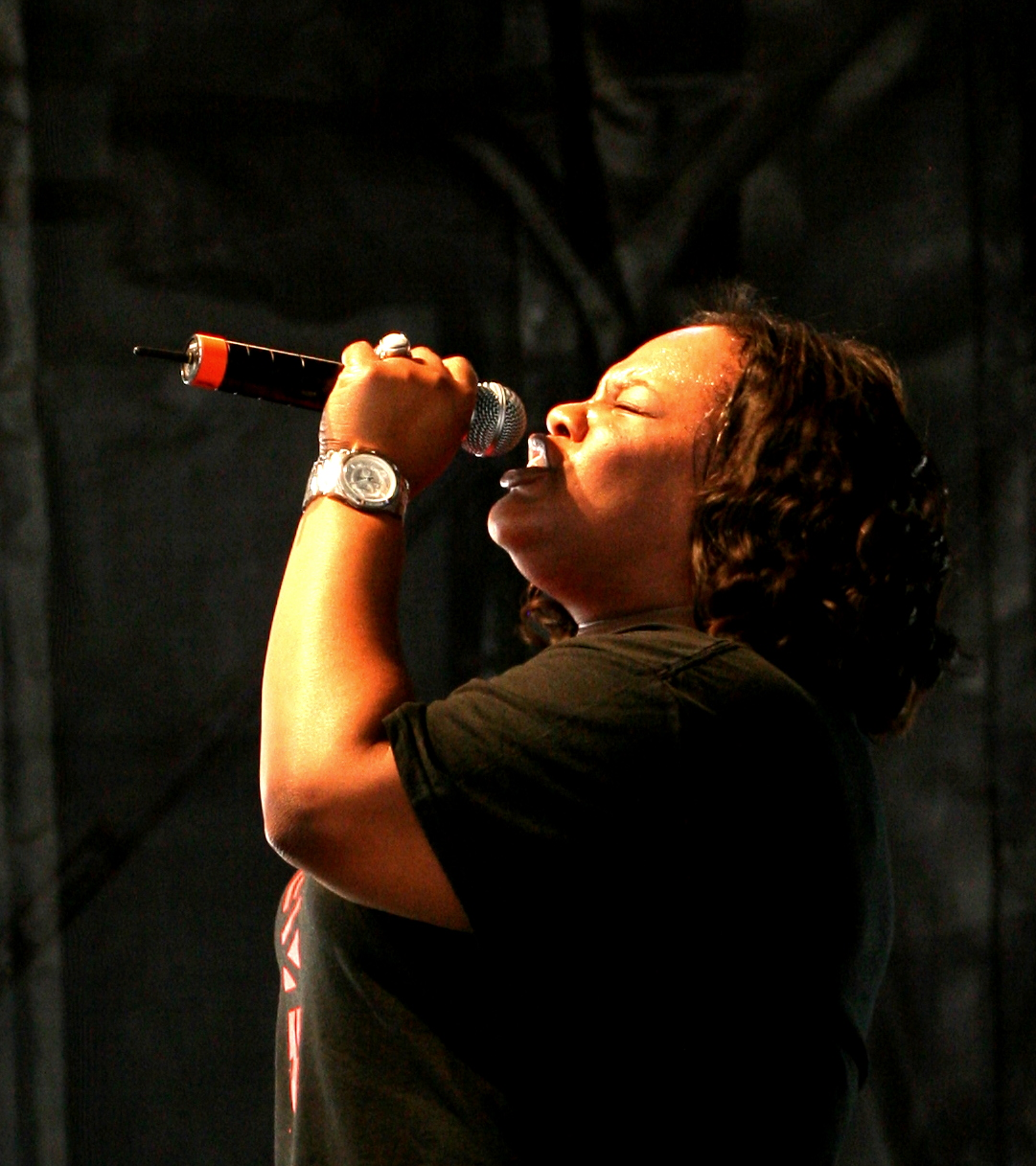
upright Tasha Cobbs Leonard's 4th studio album, and third No. 1 Top Gospel album.

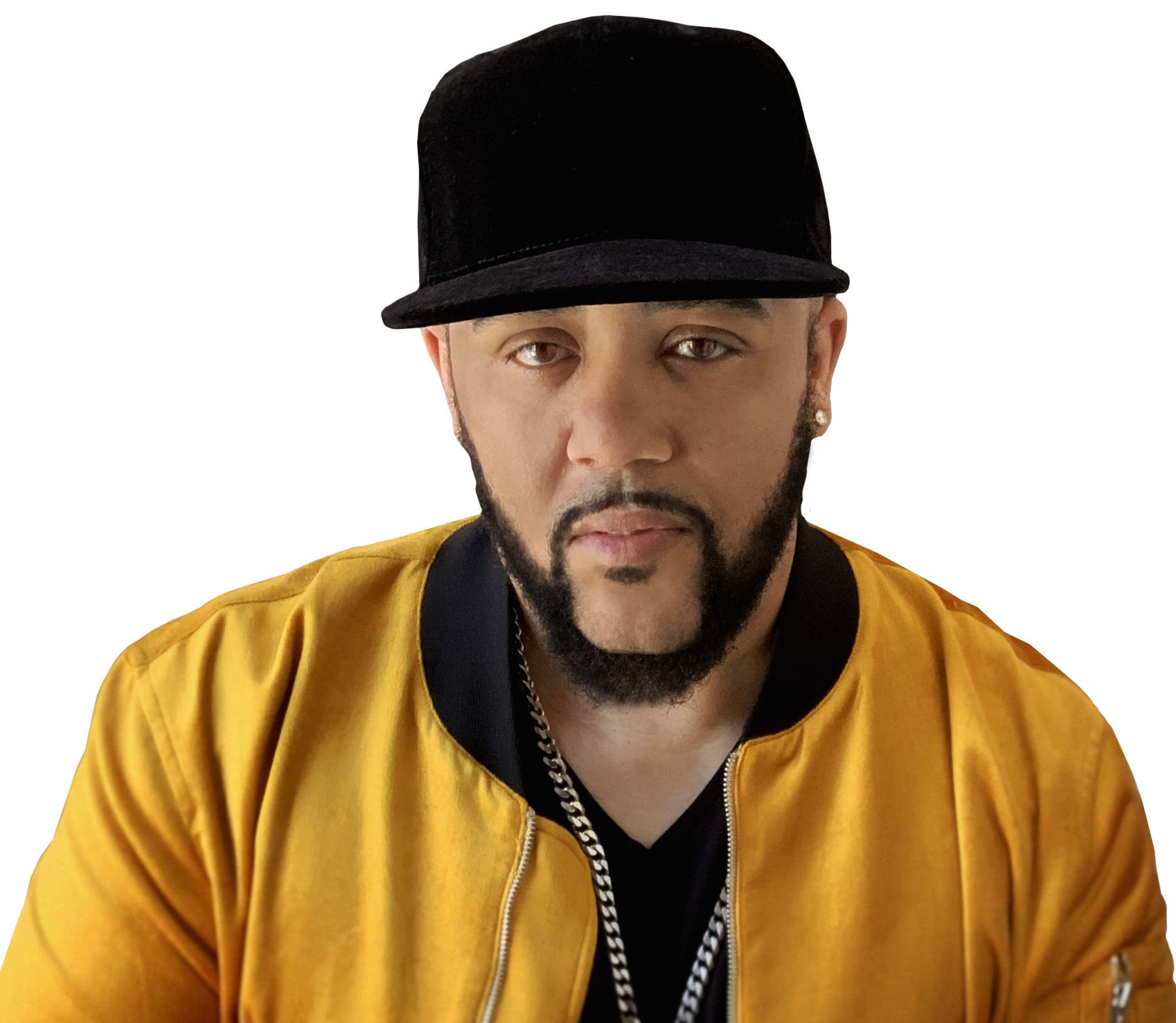
Rapper Emcee N.I.C.E.'s Praise spent three weeks atop the chart. It was the rapper’s debut as a christian hip hop recording artist.

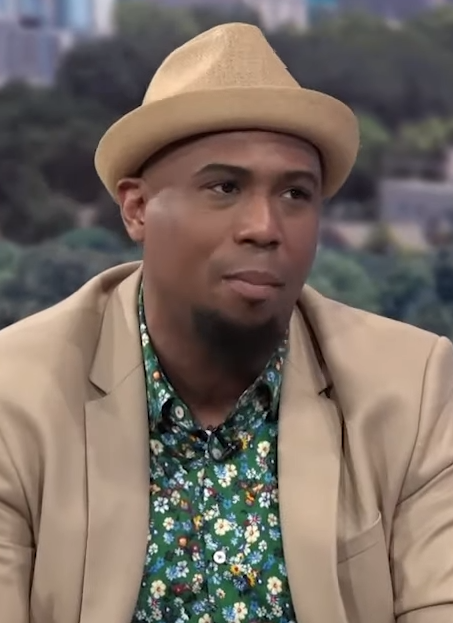
Anthony Brown & Group TherAPY's A Long Way From Sunday topped the chart for two consecutive weeks, standing as his second number-one album in the US.

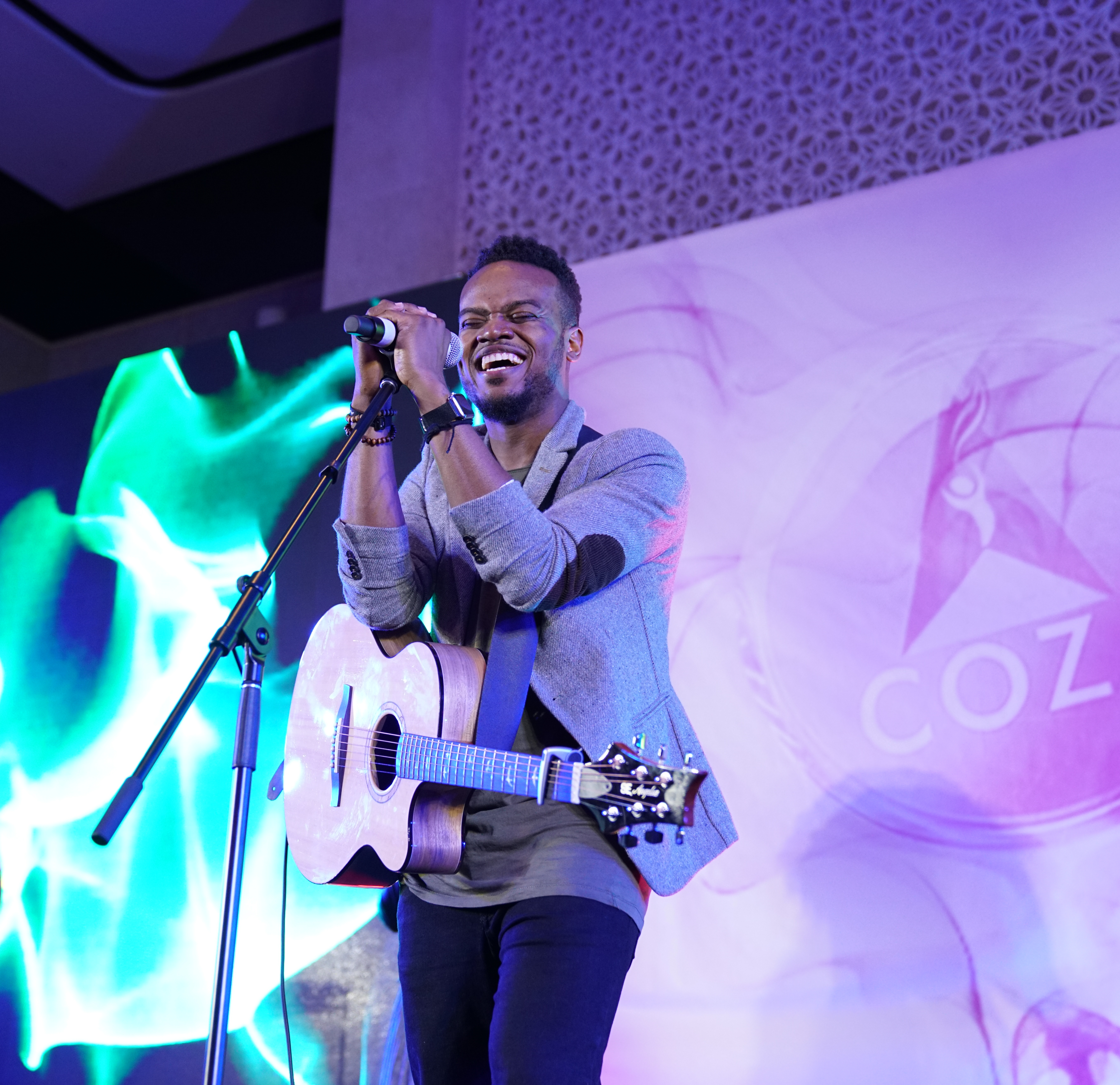
Travis Greene's The Hill and Crossover: Live from Music City both hit No.1 on the Top Gospel chart.

Key
| † | Indicates best performing album of 2017 |

| Issue date | Album | Artist(s) | Reference(s) |
|---|---|---|---|
| January 7 | One Way† | Tamela Mann | |
| January 14 | One Way | Tamela Mann | |
| January 21 | Gospel Pioneer Reunion | Various Artists | |
| January 28 | One Way | Tamela Mann | |
| February 4 | One Way | Tamela Mann | |
| February 11 | The Hill | Travis Greene | |
| February 18 | Wow Gospel 2017 | Various Artists | |
| February 25 | Let Them Fall In Love | CeCe Winans | |
| March 4 | Wow Gospel 2017 | Various Artists | |
| March 11 | Wow Gospel 2017 | Various Artists | |
| March 18 | Wow Gospel 2017 | Various Artists | |
| March 25 | Sounds Of Revival, Part Two | William McDowell | |
| April 1 | You Deserve It | JJ Hairston & Youthful Praise | |
| April 8 | Wow Gospel 2017 | Various Artists | |
| April 15 | Back To Life | Anthony Evans | |
| April 22 | Wow Gospel 2017 | Various Artists | |
| April 29 | Wow Gospel 2017 | Various Artists | |
| May 6 | Wow Gospel 2017 | Various Artists | |
| May 13 | The Glory Experience | Preashea Hilliard | |
| May 20 | One Way | Tamela Mann | |
| May 27 | One Way | Tamela Mann | |
| June 3 | One Way | Tamela Mann | |
| June 10 | The Dolly Express | Jermaine Dolly | |
| June 17 | One Way | Tamela Mann | |
| June 24 | One Way | Tamela Mann | |
| July 1 | One Way | Tamela Mann | |
| July 8 | One Way | Tamela Mann | |
| July 15 | Dear Future Me | James Fortune | |
| July 22 | Dear Future Me | James Fortune | |
| July 29 | Dear Future Me | James Fortune | |
| August 5 | Sunday Song | Anita Wilson Accompanied By The Company | |
| August 12 | I Got Out | Bryan Popin | |
| August 19 | A Long Way From Sunday | Anthony Brown & group therAPy | |
| August 26 | The Maranda Curtis Experience (EP) | Maranda Curtis | |
| September 2 | A Long Way From Sunday | Anthony Brown & group therAPy | |
| September 9 | Crossover: Live From Music City | Travis Greene | |
| September 16 | Heart. Passion. Pursuit | Tasha Cobbs Leonard | |
| September 23 | Heart. Passion. Pursuit | Tasha Cobbs Leonard | |
| September 30 | Heart. Passion. Pursuit | Tasha Cobbs Leonard | |
| October 7 | 10 | Ricky Dillard & New G | |
| October 14 | Heart. Passion. Pursuit | Tasha Cobbs Leonard | |
| October 21 | Close | Marvin Sapp | |
| October 28 | Close | Marvin Sapp | |
| November 4 | The Bloody Win | Tye Tribbett | |
| November 11 | Praise | Emcee N.I.C.E. | |
| November 18 | Praise | Emcee N.I.C.E. | |
| November 25 | The Other Side | The Walls Group | |
| December 2 | Praise | Emcee N.I.C.E. | |
| December 9 | Heart. Passion. Pursuit | Tasha Cobbs Leonard | |
| December 16 | Heart. Passion. Pursuit | Tasha Cobbs Leonard | |
| December 23 | Heart. Passion. Pursuit | Tasha Cobbs Leonard | |
| December 30 | Heart. Passion. Pursuit | Tasha Cobbs Leonard | |
