= Tonight (Emcee N.I.C.E. song) =

Single by Emcee N.I.C.E. featuring Suhana Machete

from the album However U Want It
- Released: October 4, 2014
- Recorded: 2014
- Genre: Hip hop, Rhythm and blues
- Length: 3:39
- Label: Gypsy City Music
- Songwriter(s): Emcee N.I.C.E.; William "Kelly Keys" Armour
- Producer(s): Kelly Keys

Emcee N.I.C.E. singles chronology
"Life of the Party)" (2013)	"Tonight" (2014)	""I'm All About U"" (2016)

"Tonight" is a single by American/Puerto Rican rapper Emcee N.I.C.E. It was released on October 4, 2014. It was produced by Kelly Keys, and features guest vocals from Suhana Machete. The single made its debut on the Billboard Hot 100 at number 13 and remained on the charts for 13 weeks. "Tonight" is the follow-up single to "Life of the Party" that featured Stacey Dash.

== Commercial performance ==
"Tonight" debuted at number 13 on the Billboard Hot 100 chart for the week of November 1, 2014. Its debut was driven mostly by digital download sales, staying on the Billboard chart for 13 weeks from November 1, 2014 through February 14, 2015 peaking at number 8.

== Track listing ==
- Digital download
1. "Tonight" (featuring Suhana Machete) — 3:39

== Chart performance ==
- "Tonight" spent 13 weeks on the Billboard charts peaking at No. 8.

Chart (2014)	Peak position
US Hot Singles Sales	8

== Music video ==
To coincide with the single release, Emcee N.I.C.E. 'executive produced' a music video alongside Frank DeRozan, BJ Luster & Chani Gray, who acquired the services of Earl "Slick Two Three" Bartlow of Sharp Team Entertainment based in Atlanta, Georgia.

The story a mini-movie takes place in Atlanta, Georgia where Emcee N.I.C.E. does a live radio interview with radio personality Lil Bankhead at hip-hop station Streetz 94.5 FM holding a night of your life contest for the tenth caller. The tenth caller "Tasha" played by actress/model Brittney Nicole calls in, wins the competition and invites her "party girls" co-stars Carly Daminga & Kita Hunt. Emcee N.I.C.E. with a party bus full of people, leaves station and picks up Tasha and her girls up dressed to impress. The party bus is filled with vibrant and festive party goers already partying as they head over to a premier nightclub in Atlanta with Emcee N.I.C.E. to really live it up. When Tasha and her friends walk into the club to the V.I.P. they are instantly the main attraction. They pass prominent producers Young Kros and "Tonight’s" remix producer Marvelous J, who is seen talking to a beautiful patron of the club, forgets she is there watching Tasha. In between the party scenes Emcee N.I.C.E. and Suhana Machete perform together. The party shifts back to the bus this time joined by producer Marvelous J. At the 3-minute 48-second mark the song switches from the original version of the song, to the remix version as the night comes to an end.

"Tonight" TV version available on YouTube.

== Liner notes ==
- Recorded and mixed by Dan "Deezy" Naim at The Cave, Woodland Hills, California
- Emcee N.I.C.E. – Lead Vocals and Backing Vocals
- Suhana Machete – Bridge Lead and Backing Vocals
- William "Kelly Keys" Armour – Producer
- Marvin "Marvelous J" White – Remix Producer
- Kenny "Mixx" Daniels – mastering at PatchWerk Recording Studios, Atlanta, Georgia
- Distributed by Gypsy City Music
- Executive Producers – Aulsondro "Novelist" Hamilton, Frank DeRozan, BJ Luster and Chani Gray
