= However =

However is an adverb in the English language.

It may also refer to:

- "However Do You Want Me", a 1989 song by British R&B band Soul II Soul
- "However", a 1997 song by Japanese band Glay
- "However Much I Booze", a 1975 song by The Who
- "However Much Love", a 2018 song by Filipina singer Nina
- However U Want It, an album by Emcee N.I.C.E.
- However symbol, name of a Gothic letter
