= Praise (album) =

Studio album by Emcee N.I.C.E.
- Released: September 14, 2017
- Genres: Christian hip hop, gospel
- Label: Gypsy City Music
- Producers: Aulsondro "Novelist" Hamilton (exec.), Frank DeRozan (exec.), Jack "De'Jon" Clark (exec.), Chantal Grayson (exec.), BJ Luster (exec.), Sam Peezy, Richard Smallwood, DJ Fat Jack & ULP Productions

Praise is a studio album by Puerto Rican American rapper Emcee N.I.C.E., released on September 14, 2017. Praise is Emcee N.I.C.E's first Christian hip hop album and earned him a Stellar Awards nomination for Best Gospel Rap CD of the Year.

== Singles ==
The lead single from the album, called "I Got Angels" was released on July 20, 2017. The song peaked at #1 on both the Billboard Digital Song Sales and Billboard Hot Single Sales Chart. The music video for "I Got Angels" was released on April 19, 2018. "Alright" featuring Stripped, Rahkua & The Georgia All-Stars was sent to the Praise stations on February 2, 2018 as the second single.

== Commercial performance ==
Praise peaked at No. 1 on the Billboard Top Gospel Albums chart and spawned the single "I Got Angels", which reached No. 1 on both the Billboard's Hot Single Sales chart and Gospel Digital Song Sales chart.

== Track listing ==
Credits adapted from Tidal.

“PRAISE”
No.	Title	Writer(s)	Length
1.	"PRAISE" (Scripture by: First Lady Sibrena Sinegal)	A. Hamilton, A. Avery, W. Luster	3:49
2.	"On Your Way Up" (feat. Elia Esparza)	A. Hamilton, A. Avery, W. Luster	4:20
3.	"Alright" (feat. Stripped & Rahkua)	A. Hamilton, A. Avery, W. Luster	3:56
4.	"Hypocrites"	A. Hamilton, A. Avery, W. Luster	3:23
5.	"Light of Mine" (feat. Rahkua)	A. Hamilton, A. Avery, W. Luster	3:49
6.	"I Got Angels" ((Inspired by Richard Smallwood))	A. Hamilton, A. Avery, R. Smallwood, S. Ford, W. Luster	3:54
7.	"Father, Father" (feat. Alonda Rich)	A. Hamilton, A. Avery, W. Luster	5:15
8.	"Everything Around Me"	A. Hamilton, A. Avery, W. Luster	3:38
9.	"Oh Glory"	A. Hamilton, J. Clark, W. Luster	3:22
10.	"Blessed One" (feat. Alonda Rich)	A. Hamilton, A. Avery, A. Twine, W. Luster	3:37
11.	"I Believe" (feat. Selah Avery)	A. Hamilton, J. Clark, W. Luster	3:33
12.	"Rejoice" (feat. Shalonda Johnson)	A. Hamilton, A. Avery, W. Luster	4:01
13.	"Praise - (Remix Bonus)" (feat. Raphael Leraux)	A. Hamilton, A. Avery, A. Bosworth, W. Luster	3:51
14.	"I Got Angels [ULP Remix]" ((Inspired by Richard Smallwood))	A. Hamilton, A. Avery, R. Smallwood, S. Ford, E. Harrison, P. Harrison, W. Luster	4:01

== Credits ==
=== Executive producers ===
- Aulsondro "Novelist" Hamilton
- Frank DeRozan
- Jack “De’Jon” Clark
- Chantal Grayson
- BJ Luster

Gerard Harmon - Senior VP of A&R

=== Producers ===
- Sam Peezy
- DJ Fat Jack
- Richard Smallwood
- Steven Ford
- DJ Cube & King Philip (ULP Productions)

=== Engineering ===
- Orlando Gomez @ Beacon Hill Recording Studios, (El Paso, Texas)
- Tony Touch @ Touch Tone Studios (Riverside, California)
- Ivan @ Clear Lake Recording Studios (North Hollywood, California)
- Dan Naim @ The Cave (Woodland Hills, California)
- Sam Peezy @ Peezy Institute of Technology (Carrollton, Georgia)

== Charts ==
=== Weekly charts ===
Chart (2017–18)	Peak position
US Top Gospel Albums (Billboard)	1

=== Year-end charts ===
Chart (2017)	Position
US Billboard Top Gospel Albums	27

== Awards and nominations ==
Year	Awards	Category	Result
2018-2019	34th Annual Stellar Awards	Gospel Rap CD of the Year	Nominated
