= Hot Singles Sales =

Music chart published by Billboard magazine

The Hot Singles Sales, also known as the Hot 100 Singles Sales and the POS chart, was a music chart released weekly by Billboard magazine listing each week's best-selling physical singles in the United States, such as CD singles, vinyl singles, and cassette singles. Along with the Hot 100 Airplay, Hot Digital Songs, and Streaming Songs charts, it was a component chart used to compile the main Billboard Hot 100 singles chart. The chart was first published on October 20, 1984, with Stevie Wonder's "I Just Called to Say I Love You" reaching number one.

The Hot Singles Sales was a very important component chart during the 1980s and the 1990s. In the late 1990s, airplay-only singles were allowed to enter the Billboard Hot 100 and by the mid-2000s, digital downloads had overtaken physical singles as the main sales metric. At this time if a physical single had an equivalent digital download release with the same track listing as the physical single and all of the B-sides were downloaded then it was counted as a sale towards the Hot 100 Singles Sales chart.

Madonna scored the most number ones on the Hot Singles Sales chart, with a total of 16 singles between 1984 and 2015. "What Time Is It?" by High School Musical 2 cast was the longest-reigning single on the chart, spending 28 weeks at number one during 2007 and 2008. The Hot Singles Sales was last featured on the regular issue of the magazine on July 5, 2008, when Cast of Camp Rock's "We Rock" topped the chart. Nevertheless, the chart was still published through Billboard.biz until November 25, 2017, with Emcee N.I.C.E.'s "I Got Angels" as the final number-one single.

== History ==
Since its inception in the late 1950s, the Billboard Hot 100 chart had been complied using a combination of retail sales and radio airplay data. However, in the October 20, 1984 issue of Billboard magazine, it was announced that separate charts for retail sales and airplay would also be published. They were published on the same page of the magazine and had a number to show where each song was on the main Billboard Hot 100 chart.

In the May 25, 1991, issue of Billboard, it was announced that for 30 years up until then, retail sales data had been provided to them by record stores, either by telephone or by messaging service, but that the magazine was looking into using barcode scanning to provide more accurate data. In the June 8, 1991, issue of the magazine, there had been speculation over the future of retail singles, but it had been decided that the Billboard charts being based on a combination of sales and airplay, made it a necessity to release retail singles. In this issue of the magazine, the chart began being named the POS Singles Sales chart which meant "point-of-sales". There was an overlap from when the new POS chart started being published in June, 1991, but the old retail chart was still being used as the component chart of the Hot 100, but the POS chart was fully implemented as the component chart of the Hot 100 by January, 1992.

On August 31, 1996, Billboard reported that it had been experimenting with reducing the ratio of retail sales used to compile the main Billboard Hot 100 chart from 40% to 20% due to the changing market. However, on March 1, 1997, Billboard announced that a song would not be able to chart on the main Billboard Hot 100 unless it had charted on the Hot 100 Singles Sales chart first.

On September 19, 1998, Billboard reported that the Hot 100 chart had been based on a 60/40 ratio of airplay to retail sales but that this had become problematic. Then on December 5, 1998, Billboard announced that because of the large number of singles that had been released to radio but not as retail singles, including from the genres of rock, pop, country, and R&B, that airplay only singles would be able to chart on the main Billboard Hot 100 chart. The retail component of the chart was also reduced from 40% to 25%.

By 2003, if a physical retail single had an equivalent digital release with the same track listing, and all tracks were downloaded, then this would count as a sale towards the Singles Sales chart, but if only one of the tracks was downloaded then it would count as a sale towards the Hot Digital Tracks chart, and then later the Hot Digital Songs chart. Keith Caufield of Billboard gave the example of Kate Nash's 2007 single "Foundations" that made it to number 1 on the Singles Sales chart with 14,000 sold and that 4,000 of these were retail CD singles and 10,000 were download sales. These were known as "digital bundles" or "digital single bundles". For individual song downloads, "Foundations" sold 61,000, but this was still not enough to get it onto the Hot Digital Songs chart, showing the now slight importance of the Singles Sales chart.

In the February 12, 2005 issue of Billboard, it was announced that because of the decline of sales of retail singles, that the Hot 100 had almost become the same chart as the Hot 100 Airplay, and so the addition of digital downloads was introduced into compiling the Hot 100. The number of positions on the Hot 100 Singles Sales chart for retail singles, was reduced to 20 from 25, but would have 50 positions when published on Billboard websites. In the August 4, 2007, issue of the magazine, it was announced that with the introduction of streaming being used to compile the Hot 100, that sales of retail singles would contribute towards less than 1% of how the chart is compiled.

The Hot Singles Sales chart was last featured on the regular issue of Billboard magazine on July 5, 2008, and had since become available only on Billboard.biz, the online extension of the magazine. However, occasionally the chart was still published in the regular print version of the magazine to coincide with Record Store Day. The chart was completely ended by Billboard on November 25, 2017.

== Achievements and milestones ==
=== Artists with the most number-one singles ===
| Number of singles | Artist(s) | Number-one singles | Ref. |
|---|---|---|---|
| 16 | Madonna | "Like a Virgin"; "Papa Don't Preach"; "Who's That Girl"; "Like a Prayer"; "Vogue"; "Justify My Love"; "Music"; "Don't Tell Me"; "Die Another Day"; "Nothing Fails"; "Hung Up"; "Sorry"; "Jump"; "4 Minutes"; "Miles Away"; "Bitch I'm Madonna" | |
| 12 | Mariah Carey | "Vision of Love"; "Love Takes Time"; "Fantasy"; "One Sweet Day"; "Always Be My Baby"; "Honey"; "My All"; "Heartbreaker"; "Thank God I Found You"; "Loverboy"; "Through the Rain"; "Obsessed" | |
| 11 | Whitney Houston | "Saving All My Love for You"; "How Will I Know"; "Greatest Love of All"; "I Wanna Dance with Somebody (Who Loves Me)"; "Didn't We Almost Have It All"; "So Emotional"; "Where Do Broken Hearts Go"; "All the Man That I Need"; "I Will Always Love You"; "Exhale (Shoop Shoop)"; "The Star Spangled Banner" | |
| 10 | Beyoncé | "Me, Myself and I"; "Naughty Girl"; "Check on It"; "Déjà Vu"; "Ring the Alarm"; "Irreplaceable"; "Listen"; "Beautiful Liar"; "Get Me Bodied"; "Halo" | |

=== Singles with the most weeks at number one ===
| Number of weeks | Single | Artist(s) | Year(s) | Ref. |
|---|---|---|---|---|
| 28 | "What Time Is It?" | High School Musical 2 cast | 2007–2008 | |
| 23 | "Century Love" | Men In My Head featuring 50 Cent | 2014–2015 | |
| 17 | "(Everything I Do) I Do It for You" | Bryan Adams | 1991 | |
| 16 | "Whoomp! (There It Is)" | Tag Team | 1993 | |
| 16 | "Skyfall" | Adele | 2012–2013 | |
| 15 | "I Will Always Love You" | Whitney Houston | 1992–1993 | |
| 14 | "Candle in the Wind 1997"/"Something About the Way You Look Tonight" | Elton John | 1997–1998 | |
| 14 | "Girlfriend" | NSYNC featuring Nelly | 2002 | |
| 14 | "Lose My Breath" | Destiny's Child | 2004–2005 | |
| 13 | "Macarena" (Bayside Boys mix) | Los del Río | 1996 | |

=== Year-end number-one singles ===
Chart history
| Year | Single | Artist(s) | Ref(s). |
|---|---|---|---|
| 1992 | "Baby Got Back" | Sir Mix-a-Lot | |
| 1993 | "I Will Always Love You" | Whitney Houston | |
| 1994 | "I Swear" | All-4-One | |
| 1995 | "Gangsta's Paradise" | Coolio featuring L.V. | |
| 1996 | "Macarena" (Bayside Boys mix) | Los del Río | |
| 1997 | "Candle in the Wind 1997"/"Something About the Way You Look Tonight" | Elton John | |
| 1998 | "The Boy Is Mine" | Brandy and Monica | |
| 1999 | "Believe" | Cher | |
| 2000 | "Maria Maria" | Santana featuring the Product G&B | |
| 2001 | "Loverboy" | Mariah Carey | |
| 2002 | "A Moment Like This" | Kelly Clarkson | |
| 2003 | "Bridge over Troubled Water"/"This Is the Night" | Clay Aiken | |
| 2004 | "I Believe" | Fantasia | |
| 2005 | "Inside Your Heaven" | Carrie Underwood | |
| 2006 | "Do I Make You Proud"/"Takin' It to the Streets" | Taylor Hicks | |
| 2007 | "What Time Is It?" | High School Musical 2 cast | |

=== Other achievements ===
- Elton John's double A-side single "Candle in the Wind 1997" / "Something About the Way You Look Tonight" having sold 3.5 million in its first week of release, was the fastest selling single of all time and was number 1 on both the Hot 100 Singles Sales and Hot 100 charts in 1997.
- In 2009, Madonna was named the Hot Singles Sales Artist of the Decade. It was the only time Billboard published decade-end chart for the Hot Singles Sales.

== See also ==
- Billboard charts
