= However U Want It =

Studio album by Emcee N.I.C.E.
- Released: June 25, 2015
- Genres: Hip hop, Rhythm and Blues
- Length: 55:58
- Label: Gypsy City Music
- Producers: Emcee N.I.C.E. (also exec.); Frank DeRozan (also exec.); Chantal Grayson (also exec.); BJ Luster (also exec.); De’Jon J.H. Clark (also Co-exec.); Kelly Keys; Ralph B. Stacy aka “Phantom”; Shawn Jaros; DJ Fat Jack; Young Kros

However U Want It is the debut studio album by American hip hop recording artist Emcee N.I.C.E. former Lead Vocalist/Rapper of the Urban Rock group KansasCali. The album features the single "Tonight" feat. Suhana Machete in which stayed on the Billboard Hot Single Sales chart for 13 weeks. The album also features 13 more songs with contributions from Grammy nominated and award-winning writers and producers along with a bonus track.

== Background ==
In 2012, Emcee N.I.C.E. revealed plans for his debut studio album during an interview with the Las Vegas Informer Magazine he was quoted as saying "The reason I wanted to do this album, was to bring fun back to music"... Then, original title for the album was "Way Back Now" that paid homage to the old school way of Hip-Hop music with the new school delivery."

The anticipation for the album picked up when (Actress/Fox News Correspondent) Stacey Dash was featured on a dance track entitled Life of The Party. The song received high praise from Russell Simmons Global Grind, saying that "Even though Emcee N.I.C.E. who is really Nice on the mic isn’t a household name as of yet, he soon will be.". Media giant TMZ's TooFab exclusively debuted the music video and the album was slated to make a big impact. However Stacey Dash political support for Mitt Romney and statements against President Barack Obama caused a stir among the African American community and the backlash from it caused the public to turn on anything she was a part of, even though Emcee N.I.C.E. wasn't involved and due to the backlash the label and distributors postponed the release date.

In October 2014 Emcee N.I.C.E. without fan fair and a lot of hype, would go on to release the second single from the album entitled "Tonight" feat. Suhana Machete. The single would gain momentum spending 13 weeks from November 1, 2014 - February 2015 peaking at #8 on the US Billboard Hot Single Sales Chart in 2014 (Billboard Albums). During the production of the album N.I.C.E. would change the title of the album to reflect the direction of music in which was geared towards women and entitled it "However U Want It"

== Track listing ==
| No. | Title | Writer(s) | Producer(s) | Length |
|---|---|---|---|---|
| 1. | "I Got U Baby" (featuring Suhana Machete) | Aulsondro “Novelist” Hamilton; Curtis; Flippin; Armour | Kelly Keys | 3:53 |
| 2. | "Tonight" (featuring Suhana Machete) | Aulsondro “Novelist” Hamilton; Armour; Machete | Kelly Keys | 3:40 |
| 3. | "She Is" (featuring Natasha Marie and Manny B) | Aulsondro “Novelist” Hamilton; Jaros; Marie | Shawn “J” Jaros | 4:14 |
| 4. | "We All On Fleek" (featuring Dennis Lorenzo) | Aulsondro “Novelist” Hamilton; Valerius; Barlow; Parker; Togba | Young Kros | 4:35 |
| 5. | "Life of The Party" (featuring Jus Blake) | Aulsondro “Novelist” Hamilton; Armour | Kelly Keys | 4:07 |
| 6. | "I’m All About U" | Aulsondro “Novelist” Hamilton; Stacy | Ralph B. “Phantom” Stacy | 4:07 |
| 7. | "Fix It" (featuring Dennis Bettis) | Aulsondro “Novelist” Hamilton; Clark; Bettis | DJ Fat Jack | 3:35 |
| 8. | "Make It Easy 4 U" (featuring Dennis Bettis) | Aulsondro “Novelist” Hamilton; Armour; Bettis | Kelly Keys | 3:55 |
| 9. | "With U" (featuring Emanuel Officer) | Aulsondro “Novelist” Hamilton; Armour | Kelly Keys | 5:09 |
| 10. | "The Way I Do" | Aulsondro "Novelist" Hamilton; Armour | Kelly Keys | 4:09 |
| 11. | "I Like" (Featuring Jakkai Butler) | Aulsondro "Novelist" Hamilton; Armour | Kelly Keys | 4:01 |
| 12. | "However U Want It" (featuring Emanuel Officer Trumpet: Jon Barnes) | Aulsondro "Novelist" Hamilton; Armour; Officer | Kelly Keys | 3:44 |
| 13. | "Isn’t Anybody Listening" (featuring Dennis Bettis) | Aulsondro "Novelist" Hamilton; Bettis; Stacy | Ralph B. “Phantom” Stacy | 3:44 |
| 14. | "Thankful" (background vocals Mrald Johnson) | Aulsondro "Novelist" Hamilton; Clark | DJ Fat Jack | 4:12 |
| 15. | "My Cali Lean (Bounus)" (featuring D.B.I.) | Aulsondro "Novelist" Hamilton; Chapman II; Armour | Kelly Keys | 4:06 |

Sample credits

- "I Got U Baby" contains a sample of the song "Backstrokin" performed by Fatback Band.

== Singles ==
Tonight feat. Suhana Machete peaked at #8 on the US Billboard Hot Single Sales Chart in 2014 (Billboard Albums) The single

| Artist | Album | Label | Released | Singles | Contribution | Production |
|---|---|---|---|---|---|---|
| Emcee N.I.C.E. | However U Want It (2015) | Gypsy City Music | November 2014 | "Tonight" feat. Suhana Machete | Writer & Performer | none |

== Chart History ==
| Chart (2014) | Peak position |
|---|---|
| US Billboard Hot 100 (Billboard) | 8 |

== Personnel ==
- Emcee N.I.C.E. — executive producer, primary artist
- Suhana Machete — primary artist
- Natasha Marie — primary artist
- Manny B — primary artist
- Jus Blake — primary artist
- Dennis Bettis — primary artist
- Emanuel Officer — primary artist
- Jakkai Butler — primary artist
- D.B.I. — primary artist
- Dennis Lorenzo — primary artist
- Kelly Keys — producer
- DJ Fat Jack— producer
- Ralph B. Stacy aka "Phantom — producer, bass, guitar
- Shawn "J" Jaros— producer

- Frank DeRozan— executive producer
- Chantal Grayson — executive producer
- BJ Luster — executive producer
- De'Jon J.H. Clark — co-executive producer
- Jzhamael Kebulon Ashantee— executive
- Maisha "Mrald" Johnson — background vocals
- Laskey B — background vocals
- Jon Barnes — trumpet
- Will Togba— writer (track #4)
- Earl "Slick TwoThree" Barlow— writer (track #4)
- Brandino — bass
- Dan "Deezy" Naim— head engineer, mixer
- Thomas "Tomcat" Bennett Jr.— engineer
- Eric Labson - mastering

== Release history ==
| Region | Date | Format | Label |
|---|---|---|---|
| Worldwide | June 25, 2015 | Digital download | Gypsy City Music |
| United States | June 25, 2015 | CD | Gypsy City Music |
