= Jermaine Dolly =

- Born: March 8, 1987 (age 38); Philadelphia, Pennsylvania, U.S.
- Genres: Urban contemporary gospel
- Instrument(s): Vocals, piano
- Years active: 2013–present
- Labels: By Any Means Necessary
- Dolly Express, 2017

Jermaine Dolly (born March 8, 1987) is an American gospel singer and comedian. He has been described as "likeably goofy".

He sings tenor and falsetto, and plays piano and drums. After graduating from West Chester University, he began his career as opening act for Tye Tribbett, recorded with him on his Greater Than (2013), and was included in Tribett's anthology Wow Gospel 2018. His relationship with Tribett was described as "apprentice". He also showed a "love for Marvin Gaye-styled rolling grooves,"

His first big hit, which brought him national attention upon its release as a single in 2015, was You, called "a refreshing anthem to Jesus". It and another single, "Come and Knock on My Door", were featured on Dolly's only album as of 2022, Dolly Express (2017), which reached number one on Billboard's list of Top Gospel Albums. As of 2022 Dolly has had three subsequent singles at #1 on Billboard's Gospel Airplay charts: "Pull Us Through" (2020), "Its Gonna Be Alright" (2020), and "I'll Go" (2021, written 2011).

Dolly gained a large following on Instagram for his comedic videos,
