= Big Shots (film) =

- Theatrical Release Poster
- Directed by: Robert Mandel
- Written by: Joe Eszterhas
- Produced by: Michael C. Gross; Joe Medjuck
- Starring: Ricky Busker; Darius McCrary; Robert Joy; Robert Prosky; Jerzy Skolimowski; Paul Winfield
- Cinematography: Miroslav Ondříček
- Edited by: William M. Anderson; Sheldon Kahn; Dennis Virkler
- Music by: Bruce Broughton
- Production company: Lorimar Film Entertainment
- Distributed by: 20th Century Fox
- Release date: October 2, 1987
- Running time: 91 minutes
- Country: United States
- Language: English
- Budget: $10 million
- Box office: $3.4 million

Big Shots is a 1987 American adventure comedy film directed by Robert Mandel, starring Ricky Busker and Darius McCrary.

== Plot ==
An 11-year-old boy from Hinsdale, Illinois, named Obie Dawkins (Ricky Busker) is out fishing with his father (Bill Hudson), who tells him about the birds and the bees. All the while Obie shows interest in his dad's watch, who eventually gives it to him. Later that morning in school, Obie's mom (Brynn Thayer) arrives to tell him that his dad is in the hospital. The family learns that he suffered a massive heart attack, which he dies from days later.

Arriving at school Obie is reminded of the way his dad took him to school when he sees a father drop his son off. Upset, Obie leaves school and runs away on his bike. Having left the suburbs Obie finds himself on the South Side of Chicago. There, Obie is lured into a lot where he is attacked and robbed of his bike and watch. A boy named Scam (Darius McCrary), an 11-year-old street hustler, befriends him and aids Obie in retrieving his watch. Scam takes Obie to a bar where they greet a man named Johnnie Red (Paul Winfield). Scam believes he bought the watch from Obie's muggers, Johnnie Red denies it at first, but later he tells them he did have it but gave it to a man named Keegan (Robert Prosky), a slick pawn shop owner.

Scam and Obie go to visit Keegan, and it is there at his pawn shop where Obie finds his watch. But Keegan has put it on display to be sold. They leave promising Keegan they will get him the money. Instead of going home Obie stays the night with Scam, who lives at a hotel managed by a Miss Hanks (Beah Richards). As they are heading to Scam's room a hit man named Doc (Jerzy Skolimowski), and his assistant Dickie (Robert Joy), are looking for a man who runs out the door seconds later with Doc and Dickie chasing him.

The next morning, Doc and Dickie return to the hotel having caught their mark, killed him, and stuffed his body in the trunk of their car, a dark gray colored Mercedes-Benz. Using Obie as an accomplice Scam steals the car, and they both drive to the bank to get the money for Obie's watch, with both unaware of the body in the trunk. After leaving the bank Obie has Scam to take him home to check on his family. While there, they learn that Obie's mother has reported him missing to the police. Having discovered their car stolen, Doc and Dickie begin offering a reward for its recovery. Obie and Scam return to the pawn shop to buy back Obie's watch. However, Keegan stiffs them by taking the money and refusing to give Obie his watch. Plus he makes a horrible comment about Obie's dad, sending him running out the pawn shop upset. Despite this, the boys are determined to get back Obie's watch.

Back at Scam's room, they get cap guns to use to scare Keegan. On the way out they have an encounter with Dickie, then overhear Doc asking about their missing car, leading them to hide it. Later, they burst into Keegan's pawn shop, pointing their cap guns, demanding Keegan give Obie his watch. But Keegan hits his silent alarm. Convinced that the guns are toys he dares them to shoot him. Squeezing the trigger, Obie fires a live round, revealing the gun Obie has is real. They force Keegan into his own cage and make off with Obie's watch. When the police arrive Scam is caught. Obie then gets rid of the gun and hides. He manages to subdue one of the officers and steals the car where Scam is locked in. After leading officers on a chase through the city streets and down an alley, Obie and Scam crash the car but manages to get away.

At a diner, Scam informs Obie that his own father is actually alive. According to Scam, his father went south to look for work after his parents divorced. His mother died 3 months previously and he has been on his own ever since. Having only his father's old driver's license, Scam vows to find him. At this point, Obie now considers Scam his friend as he heads home. The next morning, the Dawkins is visited by the police to find out what happened to Obie. Obie lies, claiming he caught amnesia and does not remember. Not wanting to mention his bike was stolen Obie has his mom take him to school.

While at school Obie starts thinking about Scam and decides that for all he has done for him he would help find his father. The next morning Obie steals the family jeep and returns to the hotel to look for Scam. Miss Hanks tells him that a social worker came and placed Scam in a home. After he visits the social worker and finds out where Scam is, Obie finds the jeep swarmed with police looking for him. Determined to help Scam he gets the Mercedes out of hiding and enlists the help of Johnnie Red. Though hesitant at first, Johnnie Red agrees to help him. As they set out to get Scam, someone spots the car and calls a friend to inform Doc and Dickie to claim a reward offered earlier by Doc. Obie and Johnnie Red arrive at the youth center where Scam was placed. And with Johnnie Red passing himself off as Scam's father the center releases him. Obie informs Scam that his uncle (Jim Antonio) works at the Internal Revenue Service and with his help they will find his father.

Meanwhile, Doc and Dickie head back to the bar to locate the car. Attacking the bartender the men are referred to Johnnie Red. Arriving back at Johnnie Red's place Doc and Dickie sneak up, grabbing the boys from behind. In an attempt to kidnap them Johnnie Red saves Obie and Scam, making Doc and Dickie flee. Obie and Scam head downtown to the IRS office of Obie's uncle. Using his father's driver's license, they find that Scam's dad lives in a town in Louisiana, and the two set out on a road trip. Obie's uncle tells his mom where they are headed, causing her extreme worry. Recalling their encounter with the boys previously at the hotel, Doc and Dickie force Miss Hanks into telling them Obie's name, thus leading them to the Dawkins' residence.

Posing as Chicago Police officers they find out from Obie's mom where the boys are headed. Because the car is registered in Doc's name both he and Dickie set out after the boys before they discover the body in the trunk.

When Obie and Scam get to Missouri they pick up a hitchhiking bible salesman (Hutton Cobb). He talks them into heading to a diner for lunch. At the diner, he asks them to watch his suitcase while he goes to wash his hands. Scam believes that he is a conman. Meanwhile, Doc and Dickie pass the diner, unaware that they just passed the car. Revealed to be a conman, just as Scam suspected, the conman sneaks outside and steals the car, leaving Obie and Scam stranded. Stopping so that Doc could urinate, he and Dickie spot their approaching Mercedes. Thinking it's the boys they jump back in their car and give chase. But before they are able to catch up, a State Trooper starts pursuing it for speeding, forcing Doc and Dickie break chase. When they notice that it's not the kids they follow the car to the police station. Waiting to retrieve it Dickie and Doc sit inside a diner across the street.

Meanwhile, Obie and Scam are aboard a bus heading towards their destination. But when Scam notices the conman being taken into police custody, he and Obie leave the bus to retrieve the car. A distracted Doc and Dickie allow the boys to sneak up and regain the car. They drive off with Doc and Dickie chasing out right after them. They catch up to the boys and starts ramming them to force them off the road, with Doc firing gunshots at them. But good driving skills allowed Obie and Scam to evade their pursuers. They then take the car to a dealership and trade it for another car, never knowing of the body inside its trunk.

Having traded the Mercedes for an old beat up Cadillac convertible, Obie and Scam make it to Louisiana. Heading inside the house, they learn that Scam's dad has moved. As they are heading back to the car, they noticed that Obie's mom has shown up looking for him with the police, and run out the back door to avoid them. They head into a bar to ask about Scam's dad. Overhearing their inquiry, a waitress (Ellen Geer) follows them outside and she tells them where they can find him.

As they are heading back the boys are grabbed once again by Doc and Dickie. Returning to the dealership, Dickie holds the kids captive, as Doc attempts to take back the car at gunpoint. Briefly distracted, Obie and Scam attack Dickie and flee. Running across the road, a semi-trailer truck swerves and crashes into the cars on the lot. Doc tries to run, but the chain reaction of car crashes sets off an explosion, killing him. As Obie and Scam escape motorists spot an armed Dickie, subdue him, and hold him for the police. Opening the trunk of the Mercedes, the police discover the body of the man they killed. Dickie begins claiming innocence and informs the police about the kids that stole the car.

Obie and Scam reach a car ferry to take them across the river. But with no money to pay the ferryman (Joe Seneca) and Obie willingly gives his watch. The ferryman accepts Obie's watch, but then has a change of heart and decides to take them for free. The boys arrive at a factory where employees are leaving after the ending workday. Scam spots his dad, who recognizes him as they both run towards one another and start hugging. Witnessing the reunion of Scam and his dad, Obie has found closure and is able to accept his father's death. The film ends with Scam and his dad riding back on the ferry with Obie, as he is reunited with his mother.

== Cast ==
- Ricky Busker as Obidiah "Obie" Dawkins
- Darius McCrary as Jeremy "Scam" Henderson
- Robert Joy as Dickie
- Robert Prosky as Keegan
- Jerzy Skolimowski as "Doc"
- Paul Winfield as Johnnie Red
- Brynn Thayer as Mrs. Dawkins / Mom
- Bill Hudson as Mr. Dawkins / Dad
- Jim Antonio as Uncle Harry
- Andrea Bebel as Alley Dawkins
- Hutton Cobb as Bible Salesman
- Mitch Beasley as Duane Henderson
- Joe Seneca as Ferryman
- Beah Richards as Miss Hanks
- Ellen Geer as Bar Waitress

== Reception ==
=== Critical response ===
Roger Ebert gave the movie a positive review of 3 out 4, and praised the humour and performances of the two teenaged leads, as well as the experienced performance of Robert Prosky, and said "The result is more entertaining than you might think."

On Rotten Tomatoes the film has a score of 60% based on reviews from 5 critics.

=== Awards ===
For their performances, Darius McCrary and Ricky Busker were nominated for "Best Young Actor in a Motion Picture: Comedy" at the 9th Youth in Film Awards, but they lost for Patrick Dempsey in Can't Buy Me Love.
