= Emcee N.I.C.E. =

American Christian hip-hop artist

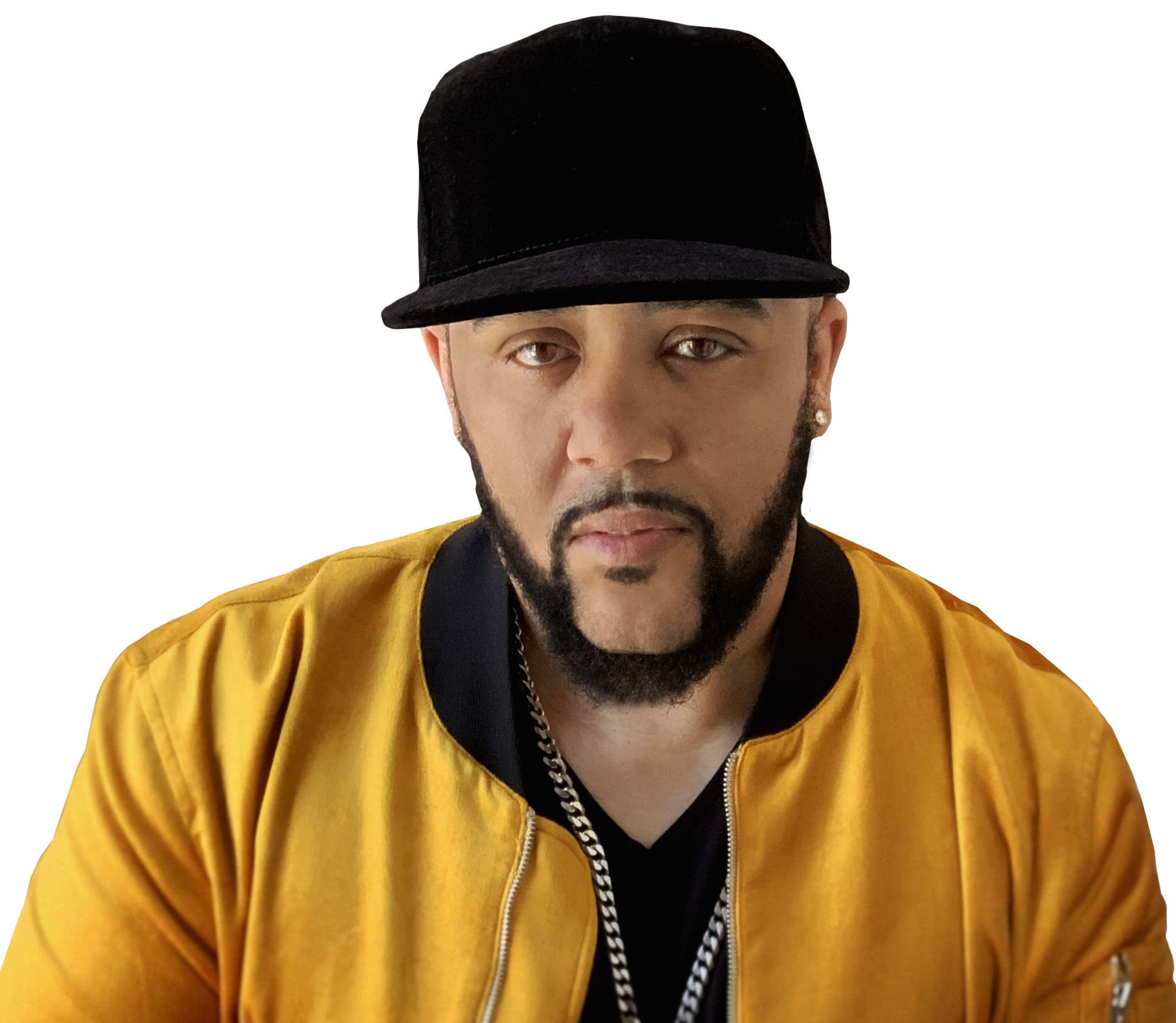
- Emcee N.I.C.E. on June 3, 2020

Background information
- Also known as: Novelist
- Born: Aulsondro Hamilton
- Genres: Christian hip hop; Hip hop; West Coast hip hop; jazz rap; conscious rap
- Occupations: rapper; songwriter; singer; actor; curator; producer
- Instruments: Vocals, drum machine, turntables
- Years active: 1994–present
- Label: Gypsy City Music
- Website: emceenice.com
- Awards: Full list

Aulsondro "Novelist" Hamilton, better known by his stage name Emcee N.I.C.E., is an American Christian hip hop recording artist, rapper, singer, songwriter, record and film producer, record executive, actor, inventor, entrepreneur and former lead vocalist/rapper of the duo KansasCali. He is the co-creator of the animated music series Da Jammies, The co-founder of The Stellar Award winning radio station God's House of Hip Hop Radio powered by Dash Radio, A Best Selling Author for his book “Music Release University”. He is president of two non-profit organizations, The iTL Foundation (Information, Technology & Literacy) of Los Angeles and Urbanomics 101, the Managing Editor for RYZE Magazine, a Christian hip hop lifestyle magazine and an American Inventor. He is the co-producer of 2 Pac's Thugz Mansion acoustic, the first single released from the certified triple platinum album Better Dayz and the Nas acoustic Thugz Mansion (N.Y.), off of the certified platinum album God's Son.

Emcee N.I.C.E.’s debut recording as a Christian Hip Hop Recording artist came when the album Praise was released in 2017 and became his first solo project to reach No. 1 on the Billboard Top Gospel Albums and “Billboard Gospel Album Sales” the album would yield Five No. 1 hit records on the Billboard charts in "I Got Angels" claiming two positions along with "Glory to God" (ft. Fred Hammond) & Nielsen BDS including a No. 1 gospel album in Praise.

Emcee N.I.C.E. received nominations for Rap Hip-Hop Gospel CD of the Year and Gospel Hip Hop Radio Station of Year at the 34th Annual Stellar Awards, the last of which he won. He is also a 12 time "The Gospel Spin Awards" winner, in the categories of "Internet Radio Personality of the Year," 2 time "Best Radio Show 2 or More – (God's Calamari w/ Emcee N.I.C.E. & The God Squad)," 2 time "Voice of the Year, Station Manager/Program Director of the Year" are the notables, he received a total of 17 Nominations in Gospel radio from the Gospel Spin Award and in 2021 Emcee N.I.C.E. was honored as "Radio Man of the Year."

Emcee N.I.C.E. also known as Novelist with the duo KansasCali, has been on six motion picture soundtracks, Oscar Award Winning film Crash song "If I...", Mr. & Mrs. Smith (International Soundtrack) song "If I Never See You Again", Haven Original Soundtrack song "Uuuh", Kickin' It Old Skool song "The Life", Once in a Lifetime: The Extraordinary Story of the New York Cosmos song "U Gotta Fight!"

== History ==
In 2015, under his real name Aulsondro Hamilton, he voiced the character "Novelist" in a 3D animated music series entitled Da Jammies.

== As a writer and performer A Lighter Shade of Brown ==
=== 1994 to 1999 ===
Year	Artist	Album	Label	Released	Singles	Contribution	Production
1994	Lighter Shade of Brown	Layin' in the Cut	Mercury Records	05/31/94	If You Wanna Groove (ft. Novelist)	Writer & Performer	
1994	Lighter Shade of Brown	Layin' in the Cut	Mercury Records	07/26/94	Hey DJ, If You Wanna Groove & Dip into My Ride	Writer & Performer	none
1999	Lighter Shade of Brown	If You Could See Inside Me	Greenside Records	08/10/99	"Next To Ball"	Writer	none
1999	Lighter Shade of Brown	Lighter Shade of Brown Greatest Hits	Thump Records	10/19/99	"If You Wanna Groove (ft. Novelist)"	Writer & Performer	none
1999	Lighter Shade of Brown	Lighter Shade of Brown Greatest Hits	Thump Records	10/19/99	"Dip Into My Ride"	Writer	none

== Albums ==
Chart (1994)	Peak position
US Billboard 200	169
US Top R&B/Hip-Hop Albums (Billboard)	54

== As a member and lead vocalist/rapper of KansasCali ==
=== 2002 to 2006 ===
Year	Artist	Album	Label	Released	Singles	Contribution	Production
2002	KansasCali	Vegas One (The beginning)	Familia Records	10/15/02	B4 U Say No	Writer & Performer	
2002	Tupac	Better Dayz	Interscope Records	11/26/02	Thugz Mansion ft. Nas	Production	Co-Producer
2002	Nas	God's Son	Sony Records	12/22/02	Thugz Mansion ft. Nas	Production	Co-Producer
2005	Christal Ray	N/A	Platinum Plug Records	04/05/05	C'Mon ft. KansasCali	Writer & Performer	none
2005	Aaron Hall	Adults Only	Bungalo | Universal Music Group	07/26/05	Serve That Body ft. KansasCali	Writer & Performer	none
2005	KansasCali	Hello World (EP)	Superb Records	09/20/05	Hello World	Writer & Performer	none
2006	K-Ci Hailey	My Book	Bungalo | Universal Music Group	10/03/06	"It's All Love" ft. KansasCali (Track #3)	Writer & Performer	Co-Producer Track No. 13

=== Charts (2002–2008) ===
Chart (2002–03)	Peak position
Australia (ARIA)	26
Belgium (Ultratop 50 Flanders)	7
Belgium (Ultratop 50 Wallonia)	18
Germany (GfK)	74
Netherlands (Single Top 100)	73
New Zealand (Recorded Music NZ)	10
UK Singles (Official Charts)	24
US Billboard Hot 100	19
US Hot R&B/Hip-Hop Songs (Billboard)	10
US Hot Rap Songs (Billboard)	4

== As Emcee N.I.C.E. (Novelist Is Constantly Evolving) ==
=== 2012 ===
Artist	Album	Label	Released	Singles	Contribution	Production
Emcee N.I.C.E.	Way Back Now	Gypsy City Music	06/2012	"Life of The Party" ft. Blake Smith	Writer & Performer	none
Emcee N.I.C.E.	Way Back Now	Gypsy City Music	06/2012	"King Kong In My Trunk"	Writer & Performer	none
Emcee N.I.C.E.	Way Back Now	Gypsy City Music	06/2012	"My Cali Lean" feat. D.B.I.	Writer & Performer	none
Emcee N.I.C.E.	Way Back Now	Gypsy City Music	11/2012	"Life of The Party" ft. Stacey Dash & Blake Smith (Dance Remix)	Writer & Performer	none
Emcee N.I.C.E.	N/A	Activate | InGrooves	12/2012	"Christmas With U" feat. Who Am I?	Writer & Performer	none

=== 2013 ===
Artist	Album	Label	Released	Singles	Contribution	Production
Emcee N.I.C.E.	Way Back Now (EP)	Gypsy City Music	January 2013	"Life of The Party"	Writer & Performer	none

=== 2015 ===
Artist	Album	Label	Released	Singles	Contribution	Production
Emcee N.I.C.E.	However U Want It (2015)	Gypsy City Music	June 2015	"Tonight" feat. Suhana Machete	Writer & Performer	none

Tonight feat. Suhana Machete peaked at No. 8 on the US Billboard Hot Single Sales Chart in 2014 (Billboard Albums)

=== 2016 ===
Artist	Album	Label	Released	Singles	Contribution	Production
Emcee N.I.C.E.	All About U	Gypsy City Music	September 15, 2016	"All About U" ft. Darius McCrary	Writer & Performer	none
Emcee N.I.C.E.	N/A	Gypsy City Music	07/2016	"Tout Le Monde en Fleek" feat. Choco Charnell	Writer & Performer	none
Emcee N.I.C.E.	N/A	Gypsy City Music	07/2016	"Je Vais" feat. Choco Charnell	Writer & Performer	none
Brandino and Friends	Many Faces of Brandino	N'House Records	September 16, 2016	"If I Could Go Back" ft. Emcee N.I.C.E.	Writer & Performer	none

=== 2017 ===
Artist	Album	Label	Released	Singles	Contribution	Production
Emcee N.I.C.E.	PRAISE (2017)	Gypsy City Music	September 2017	"I Got Angels" & "Alright" (ft. Stripped, Rahkua & The Georgia All-Stars)	Writer & Performer	none

=== 2018 ===
Artist	Album	Label	Released	Singles	Contribution	Production
Emcee N.I.C.E.	Glory to God	Gypsy City Music	March 2018	"Glory to God" (feat. Fred Hammond)	Writer & Performer	none

=== 2019 ===
Artist	Album	Label	Released	Singles	Contribution	Production
Sam Peezy	The Last Word	Peezy Tech	February 2019	"The Last Word" (feat. Emcee N.I.C.E., Miz Tiffany, Rezurrection, C.A.S.H. & Selah Avery)	Writer & Performer	none
Kyle Alexander	Oh My God	Kyle Alexander	August 2019	"Oh My God" [Remix] featuring Steven Malcolm, Emcee N.I.C.E. and Peazy	Writer & Performer	none
Michelle-Lee	Used To Be	Michelle-Lee	August 2019	"Used to Be" featuring (Emcee N.I.C.E.)	Writer & Performer	none

=== 2020 ===
Artist	Album	Label	Released	Singles	Contribution	Production
RoShawn Eve	"MGIF"[remix]-(ft.Emcee N.I.C.E.)	Right Way Records	2/2020	"MGIF" (My God is Faithful)	Writer & Performer	none
Kim Cash Tate	Cling Series	Spechouse Media	03/2020	"If I Didn't Have You (Remix) [Original Motion Picture]"	Writer & Performer	none
Selah Avery	Dance 4 Him (feat. Emcee N.I.C.E.)	Peezy Tech	05/2020	"Dance 4 Him (feat. Emcee N.I.C.E.)"	Writer & Performer	none
MAINMAIN	CUJO 2	MainMain	06/2020	"POPEYE (feat. Emcee N.I.C.E.)"	Writer & Performer	none
Emcee N.I.C.E.	Rock The Body (The Remixes)	Gypsy City Music	07/2020	"Rock The Body (feat. Alonda Rich)"	Writer & Performer	none
Rezurrection	ONE Shot	G.O.S. Muzik	06/2020	"ONE Shot (feat. Emcee N.I.C.E., Shephard Boy & Jerrell Golden)"	Writer & Performer	none
Rezurrection	Back 2 Tha Truth	G.O.S. Muzik	6/2020	"Can't Stop Praisin' (feat. Emcee N.I.C.E.)"	Writer & Performer	none
Erica Mason X Emcee N.I.C.E. X Spechouse	Holiday Love	Spechouse Media	11/2020	"Holiday Love (feat. Erica Mason, Emcee N.I.C.E. & Spechouse)"	Writer & Performer	none
DaLomonze	Back 2 Christmas	DaLomonze	11/2020	"Back 2 Christmas (feat. Emcee N.I.C.E.)"	Writer & Performer	none
A Tribe Called Blessed	Happy Hallelujah	Peezy Tech	11/2020	"Happy Hallujah"	Writer & Performer	none

=== 2021 ===
Artist	Album	Label	Released	Singles	Contribution	Production
PTtheGOSPELSPITTER	S.f.T.K.	Serving The Peace	1/2021	"S.f.T.K."(feat. Emcee N.I.C.E.)	Writer & Performer	none
DJ Penny	Testify	DJ Penny	1/2021	"Testify" (feat. Sammy Sas, Lekan Salamii, Lil Zig & Emcee N.I.C.E)(Remix)	Writer & Performer	none
Harmini	Rise Up	Harmini	3/2021	"Rise Up"(feat. Emcee N.I.C.E.)	Writer & Performer	none
RYZE Magazine Presents	This Is TBL	RYZE Magazine Records	4/2021	"This Is TBL" (feat. Lamontt Blackshire, Emcee N.I.C.E. & DaLomonze)	Writer & Performer	none
Emcee N.I.C.E.	Dancin'	Gypsy City Music	4/2021	"Dancin'" (feat. DaLomonze)	Writer & Performer	none
Travis August	Chachos	Travis August	6/2021	"Chachos" (feat. Emcee N.I.C.E.)	Writer & Performer	none
Bryann Trejo	Precious Stones	Kingdom Music Records	6/2021	"Precious Stones"[Remix](feat. Moe Grant & Emcee N.I.C.E.)	Writer & Performer	none

=== 2022 ===
Artist	Album	Label	Released	Singles	Contribution	Production
Emcee N.I.C.E.	Iron Dove (Act I) – [The Blessed Coast]	Gypsy City Music	1/2022	"Yeah" (feat. Jarrett Burton)	Writer & Performer	none
Ken Surry	Ken Surry	All God	2/2022	"Hallelujah!" (feat. Emcee N.I.C.E)	Writer & Performer	none
PTtheGOSPELSPITTER	S.f.T.K. (Remix)	Serving The Peace	2/2022	"S.f.T.K." [Remix] – (feat. Emcee N.I.C.E. & J-Nibb)	Writer & Performer	none

=== 2020-EP's ===
Artist	Album	Label	Released	Singles	Contribution	Production
Emcee N.I.C.E.	Iron Dove (The Prequel)	Gypsy City Music	06/2020	"Rock The Body (feat. Alonda Rich)"	Writer & Performer	none
Emcee N.I.C.E.	Rock The Body (The Remixes)	Gypsy City Music	06/2020	"Rock The Body (feat. Alonda Rich)"	Writer & Performer	none

=== "Tonight" ===
Title	Date	US	Album
"Tonight" (ft. Suhana Machete)	November 29, 2014	No. 8	However U Want It

=== as a CHH Artist ===
Year	Song	Chart positions				Album
Year	Song	US Christ	US Gospel	US Gospel Album	US Gospel Digital Song	Album
2017	"I Got Angels"	17	4	—	1	Praise
2017	"Praise"	—	—	1	—	Praise

Year	Song	Chart positions				Album
Year	Song	US Christ	US Gospel	US Gospel Album	US Gospel Digital Song	
2018	"Glory to God" (featuring Fred Hammond)	—	20	—	1	Glory to God

Artist	Album	Label	Released	Singles	Contribution	Production
Emcee N.I.C.E.	50 Shades of L.O.V.E. – (Learning Our Various Emotions (2015)	Gypsy City Music & Information Technology and Literacy Foundation	August 2015		Author & Narrator	none

== Music Videos ==
A music video for "Thugz Mansion" was shot. The video was nominated at the 2003 MTV Video Music Awards for Best Rap Video.

- other music videos includes:
- "If U Wanna Groove" with Lighter Shade of Brown
- "If I..." with KansasCali
- "The Life" with KansasCali
- "Life of The Party" with Stacey Dash & Blake Smith
- "I Got Angels"
- "This Is TBL" with Lamontt Blackshire & DaLomonze
- "Precious Stones" with Bryann Trejo

== Motion Picture Soundtracks ==
Year	Movie Soundtrack	Artist	Label	Released	Singles	Contribution	Production
1994	I Like It Like That	Lighter Shade of Brown	Mercury Records	06/20/94	Blackout	Writer	none
2005	Crash: Music from and Inspired by Crash (Soundtrack)	KansasCali	Superb Records	06/07/05	If I... (Track #1)	Writer & Performer	none
2005	Mr. & Mrs. Smith (International Soundtrack)	KansasCali	Warner Bros. Records | Edel Music	07/22/05	If I Never See You Again (Track #1)	Writer & Performer	none
2006	Once in a Lifetime Original Soundtrack	KansasCali	Superb Records	07/11/06	"U Gotta Fight"	Writer & Performer	none
2006	Haven (soundtrack)	KansasCali	Superb Records	09/19/06	"Uuuh"	Writer & Performer	none
2006	Kickin' It Old Skool	KansasCali	Superb Records	August 6	"The Life"	Writer & Performer	none
2020	The Answer	Emcee N.I.C.E.	Gypsy City Music	October 2020	"Lift Me Up"	Writer & Performer	none
2021	SfTK (Service for the King) The Movie	PTtheGOSPELSPITTER	Serving The Peace	December 2021	"S.f.T.K. (feat. Emcee N.I.C.E."	Writer & Performer	none

=== As a member and lead vocalist/rapper of The Rocturnals ===
==== 2008 (soundtrack) ====
Year	Movie Soundtrack	Artist	Label	Released	Singles	Contribution	Production
2008	Save The Brave (First Responders Documentary)	KansasCali	Feal Good Foundation	August 8	"In My America" ft. The Rocturnals (Acoustic)	Writer & Performer	Co-Producer

==== 2009 – 2011 ====
Year	Artist	Album	Label	Released	Singles	Contribution	Production
2009	United Students of America	"In My America" Tribute LP	USOFA	2009	"In My America" ft. The Rocturnals (Track #1)	Writer & Performer	Co-Producer
2010	The Rocturnals	2010 NBA All-Star Rookie Game	Black Casino Music	2010	This Is Where Amazing Happens ft. The Rocturnals	Writer & Performer	none
2011	The Rocturnals	The Life	Black Casino Music & Entertainment	04/2011	The Life	Writer & Performer	none
2011	The Rocturnals	N/A	Black Casino Music & Entertainment	01/2011	"Celebrate The Earth"	Writer & Performer	none
2011	Doctor Fink	Doctor Fink presents A Tribute to Prince	Tommy Boy Entertainment	8/2011	"Pop Life"	Writer & Performer	none

== Acting ==
=== Movies ===
Year	Film	Type	Role	Contribution	Writer	Director
2021	S.f.T.K.	Short Film	Judge	Co-Star	Ashante P.T. Stokes	Ray Knowledge
2012	Life of the Party	Short Film	Emcee N.I.C.E.	Co-Star	Aulsondro "Novelist" Hamilton	Kelly Schwarze
2012	Once In A Valentine	Film	DJ Emcee N.I.C.E.	Supporting	Javon Johnson, Mary Rivers-Martinez	Javon Johnson

=== Television ===
Year	Show	Network	Role	Contribution	Episodes	Show Runner
2015	Da Jammies	Netflix	Novelist	Co-Creator, Co-Executive Producer, Actor	13	Ralph Farquhar
2015	Six Degrees of Everything	TruTV	Superman	Performer	1	Marc Summers
2022	The Hip Hop Cookhouse with Emcee N.I.C.E.	Network Television	Emcee N.I.C.E.	Co-Creator, Co-Executive Producer, Actor	13	
2023	The Rookie	ABC	Elijah Stone's Bodyguard	Actor	1	
2023	The Rookie: Feds	ABC	Elijah Stone's Bodyguard	Actor	1	
2023	The Conners	ABC	The Sexton	Actor	1	
2023	9-1-1: Lone Star	FOX	Honor Dog	Actor	1	
2023	Raven's Home	Disney	Biker Gang	Actor	2	
2023	Mayans M.C.	FX	SOA Club Bouncer	Actor	1	
2024	Presumed Innocent	Apple TV+	Victim at the D.A.'s Office	Actor	1	
2024	Shrinking	Apple TV+	Tattoo Shop Worker	Actor	1	

== TV shows and special songs ==
Year	Show	Network	Release	Song	Contribution
2003	Emmitt Smith presents The Emmitt Zone	KNXV-TV (Phoenix, AZ)	2003	Emmitt Zone ft. KansasCali	Performer & Writer
2007	George Wilborn TVOne Comedy Special "I Don't Want to Be No Star"	TV One (US TV network)	October 2007	"I Don't Want To Be A Star" ft. The Rocturnals	Performer & Writer
2008	Lil JJ present "Almost Grown" (Comedy Special)	CodeBlack Entertainment	2008	"Almost Grown" ft. D.B.I. & The Rocturnals	Writer & Performer
2009	Lav Luv TVOne Comedy Special "I'm Gonna Get In Trouble"	TV One (US TV network)	October 2007	"I'm Gonna Get in Trouble" ft. The Rocturnals	Performer & Writer

== Awards and achievements ==
=== Stellar Gospel Music Awards ===
Year	Nominee / work	Award	Result
2019	Emcee N.I.C.E. (God's House of Hip Hop Radio on Dash Radio)	Gospel Hip Hop Station of the Year	Won
2019	Emcee N.I.C.E. (God's House of Hip Hop Radio on Dash Radio)	Rap Hip-Hop Gospel CD of the Year	Nominated

Year	Nominee / work	Award	Result
2020	Emcee N.I.C.E. (God's House of Hip Hop Radio on Dash Radio)	Internet Station of the Year	Nominated

Year	Nominee / work	Award	Result
2021	Emcee N.I.C.E. (God's House of Hip Hop Radio on Dash Radio)	Internet Station of the Year	Nominated

Year	Nominee / work	Award	Result
2024	Emcee N.I.C.E. (Amen Right There (ft. Canton Jones & Everett Drake)	Rap/Hip Hop Song of the Year	Nominated

=== The Spin Awards ===
Year	Nominee / work	Award	Result
2019	Emcee N.I.C.E.	Voice of the Year	Nominated
2019	Emcee N.I.C.E.	Internet Radio Personality of the Year	Won
2019	Emcee N.I.C.E.	Internet Radio Host of the Year	Nominated
2019	Emcee N.I.C.E.	Best Radio Show 2 or More – (God's Calamari w/ Emcee N.I.C.E. & The God Squad)	Won
2019	"God's House of Hip Hop Radio on Dash Radio" Curated by Emcee N.I.C.E.	Best New Station of the Year	Won
2019	"God's House of Hip Hop Radio on Dash Radio" Curated by Emcee N.I.C.E.	Internet Radio Station of the Year	Won

Year	Nominee / work	Award	Result
2020	Emcee N.I.C.E.	Voice of the Year	Won
2020	Emcee N.I.C.E. & The God Squad	Best Radio Show	Won
2020	God's House of Hip Hop powered by Dash Radio Curated by Emcee N.I.C.E.	Best Radio Station	Won

Year	Nominee / work	Award	Result
2021	Emcee N.I.C.E.	STATION MANAGER/PROGRAM DIRECTOR OF THE YEAR	Won
2021	God's House of Hip Hop powered by Dash Radio Curated by Emcee N.I.C.E.	RADIO STATION OF THE YEAR	Nominated

Year	Awards	Category	Nominee	Host	Result
2022	The Spin Awards	BEST RADIO SHOW OF THE YEAR	Emcee N.I.C.E.		Won
2022	The Spin Awards	BEST RADIO SHOW OF THE YEAR (2 or more hosts)	Emcee N.I.C.E.		Won
2022	The Spin Awards	BEST AFTERNOON SHOW	Emcee N.I.C.E.		Won
2022	The Spin Awards	INTERNET RADIO HOST/PERSONALITY of THE YEAR	Emcee N.I.C.E.		Nominated
2022	The Spin Awards	STATION MANAGER PROGRAM DIRECTOR of THE YEAR	Emcee N.I.C.E.		Nominated
2022	The Spin Awards	VOICE of THE YEAR	Emcee N.I.C.E.		Won

Year	Awards	Category	Nominee	Host	Result
2023	The Spin Awards	BEST LIVE RADIO SHOW OF THE YEAR - (God's Calamari)	Emcee N.I.C.E.		Won

Year	Awards	Category	Nominee	Host	Result
2024	The Spin Awards	BEST WEEKEND RADIO SHOW OF THE YEAR - (God's Calamari)	Emcee N.I.C.E.		Won

=== The Gospel Hip Hop Awards ===
Year	Nominee / work	Award	Result
2021	Emcee N.I.C.E.	Living Legend Recipient	Won

Year	Nominee / work	Award	Result
2022	Emcee N.I.C.E.	Male Urban Artist of the Year	Nominated
2022	Emcee N.I.C.E.	Best Gospel Hip Hop Song	Nominated
2022	Emcee N.I.C.E.	Best Gospel Hip Hop Collaboration	Nominated
2022	Emcee N.I.C.E.	Best Male Latino	Won
2022	Emcee N.I.C.E.	Best Gospel Latino Collaboration	Won
2022	Emcee N.I.C.E.	Best Gospel Hip Hop Radio Show	Won

The complete list of winners can be found here https://www.thegospelhiphopawards.com/team-4

=== Kingdom Image Awards ===
Year	Nominee / work	Award	Result
2019	Emcee N.I.C.E.	Hip Hop Artist of the Year	Nominated
2019	Emcee N.I.C.E.	Producer of the Year – (Sam Peezy)	Won

Awards/Nominations

- 2019: Stellar Awards Nomination, Rap/Hip Hop CD of the Year – PRAISE
- 2019: Stellar Awards Nomination, Internet Station of the Year – GH3 Radio (God's House of Hip Hop) – Curated by Emcee N.I.C.E.
- 2019: Kingdom Image Awards Nomination, Producer of the Year –
- 2019: The Spin Awards Nominees

== Books ==
- 50 Shades of L.O.V.E. – (Learning Our Various Emotions) (July 15, 2015)
- Music Release University - The Indies' Guide to Releasing Music! (August 19, 2022)
- Songwriting Secrets - Mastering the Art of Songwriting (November 20, 2023)

Note: (Music Release University - The Indies' Guide to Releasing Music! is an Amazon Books New Release Best Seller achieving No. 1 in the category of "Music Recording & Sound" and a Top 10 Best Seller in the category of "Music Business")
