= Da Jammies =

American animated musical television series

- Genre: Children's musical comedy
- Created by: Aulsondro "Novelist" Hamilton; William "Dolla" Chapman II
- Developed by: Ralph Farquhar
- Written by: Calvin Brown Jr.; Ralph Farquhar; T. Smith III; Wayne Stamps; Michelle Listenbee Brown; Tracey Rice
- Directed by: Tyree Dillihay; Ralph Farqhar
- Voices of: William "Dolla" Chapman II; Aulsondro "Novelist" Hamilton; Danielle Nicolet; Anderson Johnson Jr.; Alisa Reyes; Shane Tsurugi; Darius McCrary; Kel Mitchell
- Theme music composer: William Dolla Chapman II; Aulsondro "Novelist" Hamilton; Anderson Johnson Jr.
- Opening theme: "Here We Come!"
- Ending theme: "Here We Come!" (instrumental)
- Countries of origin: United States; Canada
- Original language: English
- No. of seasons: 1
- No. of episodes: 13

Production
- Executive producers: Ralph Farquhar; Aulsondro "Novelist" Hamilton; William Dolla Chapman II
- Producers: Kathleen Zuelch; Calvin Brown Jr.; Carl Craig
- Cinematography: Christine Steel; Jeremy Vargas
- Running time: 22 minutes (regular episodes only)
- Production companies: Toon Farm Animation LLC.; Gama Entertainment; Cosmic Toast

Original release
- Network: Netflix
- Release: August 31, 2015

Da Jammies is an animated musical television series that first aired on August 31, 2015, on Netflix. It was created by Aulsondro "Novelist" Hamilton and William "Dolla" Chapman II. The series covers various issues that affect children with an overarching theme of "unity" and "doing it together".

Ralph Farquhar is the executive producer. It is directed by Tyree Dillihay and Ron Myrick. Featured guest stars include Darius McCrary, Alisa Reyes, Dani Nicolet, Kurtis Blow, Buddy Lewis, Emcee N.I.C.E., William "Dolla" Chapman II aka D.B.I., Tiny Lister Jr., Kel Mitchell and James Avery.

== Premise ==
Da Jammies centers around a group of friends who attend a performing arts school where they struggle to balance real-life issues with their dreams of stardom. Co-leader Dolla (William "Dolla" Chapman II) is a quick-tempered, rapping dancer who believes that Da Jammies do not practice enough. The other co-leader, Novelist (Aulsondro "Novelist" Hamilton), plays a "peacekeeping" role and always has a solution to help the crew succeed. The other members are Momo (Alisa Reyes), a poet with a bubbly personality; LaLa (Dani Nicolet), a singing diva; and Seven (Anderson Johnson Jr.), a "soulful crooner" who always tries to be helpful. Their nemesis is another group called the Battlebrats, whose leaders Mike Fresh (Kel Mitchell) and Smalls (Shane Tsurugi) constantly seek ways to outdo Da Jammies and usually fail.

In each episode, the show addresses issues that affect young people, such as homelessness, bullying, self-awareness, body image, and friendship.

== Cast and characters ==
=== Principal cast ===
Character	Voice	Crew	Description	Attribute
Dolla	William "Dolla" Chapman II	Co-leader of Da Jammies	A fiery-tempered rapper and breakdancer. His musical heroes are Ludacris, Common, Kanye West and Usher.	Rapper and breakdancer
Novelist	Aulsondro "Novelist" Hamilton	Co-leader of Da Jammies	Novelist is a high-energy talented rapper. His musical heroes are Jay-Z, Talib Kweli, Nas and Redman.	Rapper and peacekeeper
LaLa	Dani Nicolet	Da Jammies	LaLa is a supremely vain, talented and confident R&B singer. Her musical heroes are Rihanna, Brandy, Mya, Janet Jackson and Beyoncé.	Singing diva
Momo	Alisa Reyes	Da Jammies	Momo is a new-age world spoken artist. Her creative heroes are Nikki Giovanni, Nina Simone, Ursula Rucker and Tracy Chapman. In Episode 3, her real name is revealed to be Vivian.	Singing poet
Seven	Anderson Johnson	Da Jammies	Seven is an asthmatic soul singer who is the heart of Da Jammies. His musical heroes are Freddie Jackson, Ginuwine, Luther Vandross, Joe, D'Angelo, and Ruben Studdard.	Soulful singer

=== Secondary cast ===
Einny (voiced by Shane Tsurugi) - Resident Genius

Einny is not only the resident genius with an IQ of 300, but he is the king of gadgets. He chose to forego college, telling his mother and father he knows he's smart but that he wants to grow up like a normal kid. He befriended Da Jammies and started inventing things like rockets, time-traveling machines, and space ships.

- Principal Cransberry (voiced by Darius McCrary) The Musical Has Been

Cransberry is an extremely short, money-hungry principal who exploits the students' talents for his own benefit. A former R&B singer who never made it past his first record, he knows the kids can make money, and does all he can to profit off them. This includes taking a portion of all proceeds that Da Jammies and others make while performing at the school.

- Klondell (voiced by Buddy Lewis) All World Security Guard

Klondell is a security guard at the school and the local mall. He acts as a resident uncle to the students but sees the kids as beyond stupid with their reliance on gadgets and technology. He wants things to be as they used to be.

=== Da Jammies Nemesis ===
==== The Battlebrats ====
- Mike Fresh (voiced by Kel Mitchell) Non-talented hothead

Mike Fresh comes from an affluent family that allows him to get whatever he wants. He wants to rap but is not good at it, and is jealous of Dolla. He does whatever he pleases. Part of his everyday routine is coming up with ways to sabotage Dolla, which includes Da Jammies.

- Smalls (voiced by Shane Tsurugi) The Rapping Japanese

Smalls is equally spoiled by his affluent family. He loves to rap, sometimes in Japanese and English. His dad is a well-to-do music executive who doesn't know of his son's talent. Mike Fresh and Smalls are best friends who constantly endanger themselves.

=== Additional characters ===
- Covington - James Avery. This role marks Avery's final television appearance, with the actor dying two years prior to the series' completion. As a result, the entire series was dedicated to his memory.
- Big Horace - Tommy 'Tiny' Lister, Jr. This role would mark Lister's final television appearance prior to his death in 2020.
- Shamus - Marcus T. Paulk
- Kurtis Flow - Kurtis Blow
- Crazy Craze - James "JJ" Lewis
- Lady Lark - Rebecca Shoichet
- Angelique - Kyla Pratt
- Love Man - Rodney Perry
- The Magician - Dorien Wilson
- 8's Mother - Kym Whitley
- Substitute Teacher - May May Ali
- Little Horace - Jamal McCants
- Irish / Jamaican / Pretty Girl - Malia Dawkins
- LaLa's Mother - Rena Andrews
- Nurse Kelly - Riccarda Lacey
- Novelist's Mother - Sophia Santi
- Big Daddy Candy Cane - Ulysses Braxton
- Motor City J – Taylor Boggan

== Casting ==
Eileen Mack Knight was in charge of casting for Da Jammies.

== Episodes ==
No.	Title	Characters	Original release date
1	"Mall in the Family"	Da Jammies, Motor City J, Principal Cransberry, LaLa's Mother & Novelist Mother	August 31, 2015
While attempting to rehearse for a concert to raise money for a class trip to Washington D.C, Da Jammies end up befriending an annoying kid (Motor City Jay) who wants to be a member of the group. After he accidentally destroys their treehouse in a futile attempt to prove his worth to the gang, Motor City Jay allows Da Jammies to use his mall apartment to rehearse for their benefit concert. Unfortunately, Da Jammies' mischievous behavior in the mall ends up getting them in trouble with the mall officer Klondell, who proceeds to kick Motor City Jay and his mom out of the mall after the former bribes Seven to reveal their whereabouts. When Motor City Jay reveals that he and his mom have relocated to an amusement park, Da Jammies realize that he's homeless. In an attempt to help him out, Da Jammies convince Principal Cransberry to use the money from their concert to pay for a new home for Motor City Jay and his mom. Touched by the kind gesture, Motor City Jay, as a thank you/farewell gift, decides to use the remainder of the money to fix/renovate the group's treehouse.
2	"3:10"	Da Jammies, Big Horace, Little Horace, Shamus, Mike Fresh, Smalls, Einny, Klondell, Ms. Randall the Detention Teacher	August 31, 2015
When Novelist finds himself challenged to a fight by the school bully (Horace), he goes underground and discovers a world of kids who have been hiding for fear of bullies. The Novelist finally confronts his fears and challenges Horace to a duel which winds up as a freestyle rap battle on the M-I-C.
3	"Cello"	Da Jammies, Einny, Covington, Helicopter Security, Irish Girl, Jamaican Girl, The Pretty Girl	August 31, 2015
Da Jammies discover that nothing in MoMo's life is as it seems. She is wealthy and an incredible cello player. MoMo reveals that she's under pressure from her parents to perform at a benefit concert, which prevents her from rehearsing with Da Jammies. Dolla abruptly fires MoMo and holds auditions to replace her. Da Jammies ultimately decide to support MoMo, who turns her performance into a hip-hop spoken word declaration of who she really is.
4	"Old School"	Da Jammies, Principal Cransberry, Mike Fresh, Smalls, Einny, Big Daddy Candy Cane, Kurtis Flow, Crazy Craze, and The Real Rosanne	August 31, 2015
Principal Cransberry announces that the Ridgecrest School of the Performing Arts is having an "Old School" competition and the winner will star in a Badidas shoe commercial. The only problem is Da Jammies have no idea what "Old School" is. The kids discover a hidden message on the Krash Groove soundtrack album that leads them to the Old School, a magical place where they are met by old-school hip-hop artists Crazy Craze, The Real Rosanne, and Kurtis Flow. Da Jammies learn from the true old school legends what the real is all about.
5	"Birds Tail"	TBA	August 31, 2015
6	"Will The Real Dolla"	Da Jammies, Einny, Angelique, Robot Dolla	August 31, 2015
When Dolla joins the basketball team to impress Angelique, he's torn between playing in the basketball game and performing with Da Jammies. Einny bails Dolla out by creating a Dolla robot to perform with Da Jammies while he plays basketball to secure his sweetheart. Dolla is shocked when Angelique ditches the game to watch Da Jammies perform. Meanwhile, Da Jammies are thrilled to have Dolla (Dolla Robot) in the group, especially since he's been nice to them—much nicer than (the real Dolla). Dolla is infuriated to find out that not only has the Dolla Robot taken his place in the group, but Angelique also has a crush on him.
7	"Da Fab Five"	TBA	August 31, 2015
Da Jammies go to Einny for help after they lose to the Battle Brats in a pick-up game of basketball. Einny gives them some special basketball shoes that will help them jump higher and run faster. Seven mistakenly pushes a button on the back of the shoes that sends an electrical pulse through all of Da Jammies and suddenly they discover they have superpowers.
8	"The Head Wizard"	TBA	August 31, 2015
9	"You're In The Game"	TBA	August 31, 2015
10	"No Gut, No Glory!"	TBA	August 31, 2015
11	"Love Song"	TBA	August 31, 2015
12	"Election"	TBA	August 31, 2015
13	"OMG"	TBA	August 31, 2015
Principal Cransberry bans talking on cell phones, texting, or emailing while students are at school forcing the Jammies to come up with a new way to communicate that only kids can hear.

== Broadcast ==
As of 2016, Da Jammies was streaming in 14 countries on Netflix: Australia, Bangladesh, Canada, India, Ireland, Luxembourg, New Zealand, Pakistan, Philippines, Russia, South Africa, Thailand, UK and USA.

As of 2021, Da Jammies was no longer available on Netflix.

== Reception ==
Da Jammies received mixed but favorable reviews upon its debut. Forbes magazine called it "Fame" meets "Josie and The Pussycats". Soul Train deemed it a "First of its kind 3D animated series that combines hip-hop music, dance and fashion". The show received 3 out of 5 stars on Common Sense Media.
