= Mo' Money =

1992 film by Peter MacDonald

- Theatrical release poster
- Directed by: Peter MacDonald
- Written by: Damon Wayans
- Produced by: Michael Rachmil
- Starring: Damon Wayans; Stacey Dash; Joe Santos; John Diehl; Marlon Wayans
- Cinematography: Don Burgess
- Edited by: Hubert C. de la Bouillerie
- Music by: Jay Gruska
- Production company: Wife n' Kids Productions
- Distributed by: Columbia Pictures
- Release date: July 24, 1992
- Running time: 89 minutes
- Language: English
- Budget: $10 million
- Box office: $40,227,006

Mo' Money is a 1992 American comedy-drama film directed by Peter MacDonald, and written by Damon Wayans, who also starred in the film. The film co-stars Stacey Dash, Joe Santos, John Diehl, Harry Lennix, Bernie Mac (in his film debut) and Marlon Wayans. The film was released in the United States on July 24, 1992.

== Plot ==
Ted Forrest, who works for the Dynasty Club, is murdered by Keith Heading and his men on the street. They switch a computer tape in Ted's car before police arrive. Johnny Stewart is a lifelong con man who performs scams with his younger brother Seymour. When Johnny meets Amber Evans, he tries to impress her by obtaining an honest job at the company where she works—Dynasty Club, a credit card firm.

He becomes a mailroom clerk. Chris Fields trains Johnny how to do the job. Keith threatens Chris in the men's restroom, terrifying Chris. Johnny realizes that he needs money to woo Amber. He develops a scheme to commit identity theft with the credit card information of deceased cardholders to which he has access due to his mailroom position. He justifies his actions because he knows that he is stealing from only the company and not harming the individual cardholders.

Lt. Raymond Walsh, who was once the partner of Johnny's deceased father, asks Chris questions about Keith. Chris is stabbed and killed by Keith's hitmen in the subway station. Lt. Walsh investigates Chris's murder and finds credit card receipts on him. Keith promotes Johnny from mailroom clerk to supervisor to replace Chris.

With Seymour's help, Johnny charges large amounts of money to the cards with the intention of impressing Amber. Keith is head of security at Dynasty Club, and he also runs a virtual stolen credit card operation. He records Johnny stealing a returned credit card and pressures him to join the credit card criminal enterprise.

Seymour takes a stolen credit card and attempts to buy a four-fingered ring. However, a security alarm blares, indicating the stolen card. Seymour tries to escape but is caught by mall security and questioned by police. The police authorize a sting operation on Seymour to record Keith's conversation and to capture him. Lt. Walsh becomes furious about the operation.

Keith and his hitmen try to kill Johnny for blackmail and shoot Lt. Walsh in the arm. Keith kidnaps Seymour, and Johnny goes after him until he escapes. Keith tries to kill Johnny by shooting him in the shoulder. A fight ensues between them until Johnny kills him by hanging him. Seymour and Amber visit Johnny lying in the hospital bed injured and decide to settle down.

== Cast ==
- Damon Wayans as Johnny Stewart / Anton Jackson / Blaine Edwards
- Stacey Dash as Amber Evans
- Joe Santos as Lieutenant Raymond Walsh
- John Diehl as Keith Heading
- Harry J. Lennix as Tom Dilton
- Marlon Wayans as Seymour Stewart
- Mark Beltzman as Chris Fields
- Quincy Wong as Eddie
- Kevin Casey as Lloyd
- Larry Brandenburg as Businessman
- Garfield as "Rock"
- Almayvonne as Charlotte
- Gary Growden as Car Wash Attendant
- Richard E. Butler as Ted Forrest
- Matt Doherty as Kid
- Evan Lionel Smith as Detective Mills
- James Deuter as Mr. Shift
- Rondi Reed as District Attorney
- Richard Hamilton as Judge Harold Lake
- Salli Richardson-Whitfield as Customer
- Pete Gardner as Officer Deebs
- Lorenzo Clemons as Officer Royce
- Robert Swan as Detective Lawrence
- JoBe Cerny as Patrolman
- Jackie Hoffman as Jill
- Bernie Mac as Club Doorman
- Irma P. Hall as Lady On Phone

== Production ==
The movie was filmed in Chicago, Illinois in 64 days from July 16 to September 18, 1991. The premise is loosely based on a job Damon Wayans had in the early-1980s after dropping out of high school where he worked in the mailroom at a credit card company and was arrested for stealing preapproved credit cards, though he got off with probation.

== Reception ==
The film had a mostly negative reception. Michael Wilmington of the Los Angeles Times recalled that "there are amusing things in Mo’ Money—the chemistry of the Wayans team, the paterfamilias routine of Joe Santos as a good cop, the piquant sexiness of Stacey Dash—but they get steamrollered by all the high-tech crash-bang movie machismo." Hal Hinson wrote in The Washington Post that Damon Wayans, "the In Living Color star, who wrote and executive-produced this new picture, has a handful of these sublimely blank moments in Mo' Money, but not nearly enough to anesthetize us to the film's painful deficiencies." The New York Times' Janet Maslin wrote that "the film would have been helped by more directorial spark than is supplied by Peter MacDonald, who is effectively stumped by the screenplay's split personality. Some of the material is played as comedy [...] but a lot of the film hinges on some intrigue involving a corporate swindle, and neither the scheme nor the villains are compelling." The film received a more favorable review from Variety, which stated that the "loosely structured film has trouble meshing its very funny gag scenes with rough action footage, but it should earn mucho change from escapist fans." It holds a 16% approval rating on Rotten Tomatoes based on 25 reviews, with an average rating of 4.2/10. The website's critics consensus reads: "Mo' Money only comes with mo' problems in this comedically bankrupt outing from the Wayans brothers."

== Box office ==
The film debuted at number one at the United States box office, grossing $12,385,415 during its opening weekend. Produced on a budget of $10 million, it ultimately earned $40,227,006 in North America, grossing roughly four times its production budget. The film was released in the United Kingdom on December 18, 1992, where it opened at number five at the box office.

== Home media ==
DVD was released in Region 1 in the United States on January 1, 2002, and also Region 2 in the United Kingdom on 17 June 2002, it was distributed by Columbia TriStar Home Entertainment.

== See also ==
- Mo' Money (soundtrack)
