= Darius McCrary =

American actor, rapper, producer (born 1976)

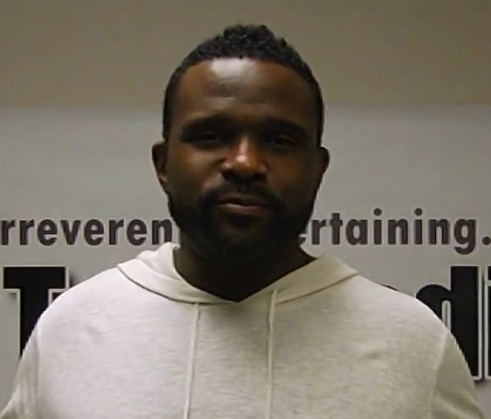
- McCrary in 2016
- Born: Darius Creston McCrary; May 1, 1976 (age 50); Walnut, California, U.S.
- Occupations: Actor; singer; producer
- Years active: 1987–present
- Known for: Eddie Winslow – Family Matters
- Spouses: Juliette M. Vann (m. 2005; div. 2006); Karrine Steffans (m. 2009; div. 2011); Tammy Brawner (m. 2014; div. 2017)
- Children: 3
- Father: Howard McCrary

Darius Creston McCrary (born May 1, 1976) is an American actor, singer and producer. McCrary is known for his role as Edward "Eddie" Winslow, the oldest child of Carl and Harriette Winslow on the ABC/CBS television sitcom Family Matters, which ran from 1989 to 1998.

He also played Scam in the 1987 comedy film Big Shots, which was his film debut. He provided the voice of Jazz in Transformers (2007). From December 2009 to October 2011, he portrayed photographer Malcolm Winters on the CBS daytime drama The Young and the Restless.

== Early life and career ==
McCrary began his career as a child actor and made his film debut in the 1987 comedy Big Shots. He also appeared in guest spots in episodic television and had a role in the 1988 film Mississippi Burning before landing the role of Eddie Winslow in Family Matters the following year. After Family Matters ended its run in 1998, McCrary co-starred in the short-lived UPN series Freedom. In 2000, he had a lead role as Tommy in "Something to Sing About", a Christian drama produced by the Billy Graham Evangelistic Association. In 2001, he appeared in 15 Minutes opposite Robert De Niro and Kingdom Come, with Whoopi Goldberg.

In April and May 2006, McCrary reunited with his Family Matters co-star Kellie Shanygne Williams as Jamal on UPN's Eve for two episodes. In 2007, he was the voice of Jazz in the movie Transformers. McCrary also had film roles in Next Day Air, Saw VI, and in national stage play productions such as The Maintenance Man. That December, he joined the cast of the CBS daytime drama The Young and the Restless. McCrary portrayed Malcolm Winters, a role originated by Shemar Moore. Joined on the series by his former Family Matters co-star Bryton James (né McClure), McCrary left The Young and the Restless in October 2011. McCrary's first album was also released the same year.

On January 6, 2010, McCrary appeared as himself in an episode of I Get That a Lot on CBS. He was pumping gas, and Paris Hilton was pretending to be a clerk at the gas station. She recognized him and asked for his autograph. He thought it was her and after she confessed who she was, he said he thought she was doing community service. McCrary later starred in the stage play In-Laws From Hell written, directed, and produced by Andrionna L. Williams.

== Personal life ==
McCrary is the founder of Fathers Care, a non-profit organization under the McCrary Foundation umbrella, started by his father, aunts and uncles, cousins also known as The McCrarys.

=== Legal issues ===
In 2015, he was arrested and held in custody for failure to pay child support, but was released after two hours when he paid the full $5,500 in back support owed. In February 2019, McCrary was ordered to attend at least 10 visits to drug/alcohol abuse and batterer's intervention classes within 12 months, submit to random drug testing within 60 days, and then enroll in and complete 10 co-parenting classes, which were allowed to be done individually, in order to obtain visitation rights to see his daughter Zoe, with ex-wife Tammy Brawner, who was granted full legal and physical custody of their then-3-year-old daughter, previously citing concerns for Zoe's safety. On November 27, 2023, McCrary was arrested a second time on felony charges of failure to pay child support of over $52,000 as of March 2019. He pleaded not guilty, and his bond was set at $13,197.01, according to court documents.

On October 5, 2025, the U.S. Border Patrol arrested McCrary near the U.S.-Mexico border in San Diego, California on an out-of-state felony warrant. For this charge, which has not only been deemed a charge but which also led to McCrary being booked on a "fugitive arrest," he was ineligible for bail and he remained in a San Diego jail. He would make his first court appearance for this charge on October 15, 2025. It was later revealed that the arrest resulted from an arrest warrant which had been issued against McCrary in Oakland County, Michigan after he was charged with four counts of unpaid child support, for which he faces a maximum of four years in prison, and one count of skipping planned court hearings in Michigan for the summer of 2024, with prosecutors eventually threatening to request his extradition for skipping a court hearing on August 12, 2024. During his initial October 15, 2025, court hearing, which was held in a San Diego court, McCrary would be denied bail after being ruled a flight risk and was ordered to be extradited to Michigan. However, McCrary plans to fight the extradition. On December 8, 2025, he was released from custody in Michigan after entering a no-contest plea to the five felony charges. He was scheduled to be sentenced for these charges on February 9, 2026. However, sentencing has now been rescheduled for January 25, 2027

== Filmography ==
=== Film ===
Year	Title	Role	Notes
1987	Big Shots	Jeremy "Scam" Henderson	
1988	Mississippi Burning	Aaron Williams	
1995	Kidz in the Wood	Tootooe	TV movie
1997	Don King: Only in America	Muhammad Ali	TV movie
1998	Park Day	Andre Simmons	
1999	The Breaks	Shaquan	
2000	Something to Sing About	Tommy	TV movie
2001	Kingdom Come	Royce Slocumb	
2001	15 Minutes	Detective Tommy Cullen	
2002	Vampires: Los Muertos	Ray Collins	
2002	Hostage	FBI Commander Darius Jackson	Short
2004	The Maintenance Man	Malcolm Tremell	Video
2006	Da Jammies	Dean Cransbury (voice)	Video
2007	Transformers	Jazz (Voice)	
2009	Next Day Air	Buddy	
2009	Steppin: The Movie	Sinis	
2009	Saw VI	Dave	
2010	Church	Daniel	
2011	35 and Ticking	Nick West	
2011	The Perfect Gift	Darren Smith	
2011	He's Mine Not Yours	William	
2011	Houndz from Hell	Extract	
2013	24 Hour Love	Vernon	
2013	Will a Man Rob God?	Corey	Video
2014	Reach Me	Captain Hawkings	
2015	The Summoning	Drew	
2016	Love Under New Management: The Miki Howard Story	Gerald Levert	TV movie
2019	Fanatic	Officer Hardaway	TV movie
2020	Christmas in Carolina	Marlone	
2020	True to the Game 2	Detective Joe	
2021	True to the Game 3	Detective Joe	
2022	Wayward	Anthony Demme	
2023	Sebastian	Detective Dale Dumars	Tubi release

=== Television ===
Year	Title	Role	Notes
1987	Amen	Darius Hughes	Episode: "The Twelve Songs of Christmas"
1987	Hooperman	Wendell	Episode: "Deck the Cell with Bars of Folly"
1988	What's Happening Now!!	Brian	Episode: "The Fabulous Fortunes"
1989–98	Family Matters	Edward "Eddie" Winslow	Main Cast
1996	Soul Train	Himself/Guest Host	Episode: "Mint Condition/For Real/Case Featuring Foxy Brown/Southside B.O.I.Z."
1996	Moesha	Dante Woodson	Episode: "Hakeem's New Flame"
2000	City of Angels	Manny	Episode: "Dress for Success"
2000	Freedom	James Barrett	Main Cast
2001	The Test	Himself/Panelist	Episode: "The Infidelity Test"
2003	Kingpin	Truck Thomas	Main Cast
2003	Girlfriends	Antoine Childs	Episode: "You Ain't Gotta Go Home But... You Know the Rest"
2004	Dr. Vegas	Stan	Episode: "Pilot"
2005	Committed	Bowie James	Main Cast
2006	Eve	Jamal	Episode: "Separate, But Unequal" & "Daughter Don't Preach"
2009	Whatever Happened To?	Himself	Episode: "Troubled Teens"
2009	Star-ving	-	Episode: "Straight Outta Compton"
2009	Cold Case	Eric "Showtime" Hynes	Episode: "Stealing Home"
2009–11	The Young and the Restless	Malcolm Winters	Regular Cast
2010	I Get That a Lot	Himself	Episode: "Gene Simmons, Paris Hilton, Julie Chen, Tony Hawk, Snoop Dogg, Rachael Ray"
2012	Rizzoli & Isles	TK	Episode: "Home Town Glory"
2012–13	Anger Management	Donovan	Recurring Cast
2013	The Soul Man	Patrice	Episode: "Boyce in the Hood"
2015	The Leftovers	Isaac Rayney	Recurring Cast: Season 2
2015	Minority Report	Agent Aman Shale	Episode: "Memento Mori" & "Everybody Runs"
2015–16	Da Jammies	Principle Cransberry (voice)	Recurring Cast
2016	Pitch	Kevin	Episode: "The Break"
2016–18	Star	Otis Leecan	Recurring Cast: Season 1, Guest: Season 2
2017	The Catch	Raymond Taggart	Episode: "The Birthday Party"
2017	Snowfall	Andre	Episode: "2016 Original Pilot"
2018–21	Monogamy	Connor	Main Cast
2020	American Soul	James Brown	Episode: "Say You Love Me"

=== Music video ===
Year	Song	Artist	Role
2017	"Add to Me"	Ledisi	Party Guest

=== Documentary ===
Year	Title
2007	I'm Rick James
2009	Kiss and Tail: The Hollywood Jumpoff

== Music career ==
=== 2016 ===
Artist	Album	Label	Released	Singles	Contribution	Production
Emcee N.I.C.E.	All About U	Gypsy City Music	07/2016	"All About U" ft. Darius McCrary	Writer & Performer	none

== Award nominations ==
Year	Award	Result	Category	Film or series
1988	Young Artist Award	Nominated	Best Young Actor in a Motion Picture – Comedy	Big Shots
1989	Young Artist Award	Nominated	Best Young Actor in a Motion Picture – Drama	Mississippi Burning
1993	Young Artist Award	Nominated	Best Young Actor Starring in a Television Series	Family Matters
