= Life of the Party (Emcee N.I.C.E. song) =

Single by Emcee N.I.C.E. featuring Blake Smith and Stacey Dash

from the album However U Want It
- Released: October 12, 2012
- Recorded: 2012 at The Cave, Woodland Hills, California
- Genre: Dance, dubstep, R&B, hip hop
- Length: 3:57
- Label: Gypsy City Music
- Songwriters: Emcee N.I.C.E., Stacey Dash
- Producer: Kelly Keys

Emcee N.I.C.E. featuring Blake Smith and Stacey Dash singles chronology
"Life of the Party" (2012)	"I Go Stupid" (2014)

Alternative cover
- Life of the Party cover

"Life of the Party" is a 2012 song performed by American recording artist Emcee N.I.C.E. and features the singing debut of actress Stacey Dash and newcomer Blake Smith. It was produced by Ralph “Phantom” Stacy. It serves as the remix to the original version produced by Kelly Keys which features just Blake Smith. It was the lead single from Emcee N.I.C.E.’s 2015 debut studio album, However U Want It. The song was written by Aulsondro “Novelist” Hamilton with Stacey Dash joining in on the remix. It came out on October 12, 2012, alongside a long-form music video. The music video broke into the mainstream by TMZ's subsidiary TooFab.

The song received high praise from Russell Simmons Global Grind, saying that “Even though Emcee N.I.C.E. who is really Nice on the mic isn’t a household name as of yet, he soon will be".

== Composition ==
"Life of the Party" features Stacey Dash and Blake Smith was written by Aulsondro “Novelist” Hamilton aka Emcee N.I.C.E. and Stacey Dash and was produced by Ralph “Phantom” Stacy whose notable hits includes (Dru Hill, Luther Vandross, SWV, Mario (American singer) and more...), with backing vocals by Emcee N.I.C.E., Blake Smith & Stacey Dash. The track was digitally edited and arranged by Ralph “Phantom” Stacy. The original version, slower with an R&B, Hip Hop vibe was produced by Kelly Keys. However both versions were recorded and mixed by Dan “Deezy” Naim at “The Cave” Woodland Hills, California. The song was later mastered by Big Bass Brain Gardner at the infamous Bernie Grunmand Mastering lab in Hollywood, California.

"Life of the Party" plays for 3 minutes and 57 seconds in common time and at a tempo of 123 beats per minute. It is a dance, dubstep, R&B, and hip hop song in the key of F. Emcee N.I.C.E. sings the main notes while Blake Smith sings the upper notes with Stacey Dash singing in falsetto.

== Critical reception ==
The song received positive reviews from Russell Simmons Global Grind, calling the song a “Definite Banger! That Stacey Dash fans should thank him now”.TMZ subsidiary TooFab calling it an “Epic Hit”

== Music video ==
To coincide with the single release Emcee N.I.C.E. called on Executive Producers Frank DeRozan & Chantal Grayson who acquired the services of ProWerks Media & Director Kelly Schwarze based in Las Vegas, Nevada and edited by Emmy Award winner John Paul Franco to deliver a modern-day take on Night at the Museum conceptualized by Jose Torres (America's Best Dance Crew).

The story takes place at the Las Vegas Natural History Museum where the watch guard (played by James McGuire) goes to sleep on the job. Meanwhile, Blake Smith is seen sneaking into the museum to check out the new Hip-Hop exhibit (Emcee N.I.C.E.). In the Hip-Hop exhibit N.I.C.E. is seen as a wax figure standing with his bodyguard draped in the familiar Run Dmc Adidas look with a fedora and the classic Adidas Superstar shoes. Blake pulls the tarp off of the drum machine and pushes the button that starts the music to bring the wax figures to life. Emcee N.I.C.E. comes to life first, followed by Stacey Dash channeling Cleopatra in an Egyptian setting. The Egyptian guards come to life, followed by her servants, the cave woman ending with the Nabtry Cultural Dancers (African dancers). Once awakened everyone converges to have one big party. The noise is so loud that in the end it wakes the guard who goes to see where the noise is coming from only to find a gold ankle bracelet that Stacey dropped during the museum party. The music video has two versions. One version is a 7-minute and 10 second full-length mini-movie while the second one is a 4-minute 12 second TV version both available on YouTube.

== Personnel ==
- Emcee N.I.C.E. – Lead and backing vocals
- Stacey Dash – Second bridge lead and backing vocals
- Blake Smith – First bridge lead vocals and backing vocals
- Ralph "Phantom" Stacy – Dance remix producer, arrangement
- Kelly Keys – Original version producer
- Big Bass Brian Gardner – mastering
- Recorded and mixed by Dan "Deezy" Naim at The Cave, Woodland Hills, California
