= Ashante P.T. Stokes =

American artist and actor

Ashante P.T. Stokes is an American rhythm and gospel artist and actor. He began his career as a rhythm and gospel vocalist and rapper in early 2013 and his acting in late 2013.

Born in Atlanta, Georgia, Stokes was a youth chanter at Wheat Street Baptist Church and played the hand bells at Hillside Presbyterian Church. His inaugural live performance as PT The Gospel Spitter was January 25, 2013 at Mark SQuared in Tucker, Georgia. In late 2013, a friend urged him to audition for a small part in an indie film, Burning Bridges. The casting director asked him to audition for a larger supporting role that he won.

In 2014, he recorded his studio album, Raise Up. Two singles, "Understanding God" and "Salvation RMX" were part of a music mini-film deal between his label and production company, Serving the Peace, LLC and StewArt Media Studios. "Understanding God", the music mini-film debut was at Borderline 2015, a Haitian American Christian Hip Hop celebration in Lawrenceville, Georgia. "Salvation RMX" the music mini-film premiered in May 2015 at Stephenson High School, Stone Mountain, Georgia. In August 2015, "Salvation RMX" won the Audience Choice award for a music video and garnered Stokes a best director nomination at the Gwinnett Center International Film Festival. He was named New Urban Hip Hop Artist of the Year, July 31, 2016, by the Independent Artist Christian Music Association.

== Early life ==
Stokes was born in Atlanta, Georgia. He spent a year of his early life in Pittsburgh, Pennsylvania with his paternal grandparents. Stokes finished high school in Middletown, Connecticut where he was a scholar-athlete and competed in USATF Youth track at the Junior Olympics level. He was a sprinter in the Mid-Atlantic Conference (MAC) as an Ohio University Bobcat.

== Rhythm and gospel career ==
In 2010, Stokes performed in the Gospel Music Association's Immerse competition, advancing through to the semifinal round. He established a professional relationship with a vocal coach, principle operatic soprano, Maria Clark. He was introduced to Hit'em Hard Entertainment and recorded his first two mixtape singles resulting in his first live performance as PT The Gospel Spitter at Mark SQuared in Tucker, Georgia on January 25, 2013.

In April 2014, PT did a 30-second promo video for United Christian Broadcasters' (UCB) Gig in a Shed, for BigChurchDayOut, a contemporary Christian music festival generally held in Wiston, West Sussex, England. The video is an edit of a longer live performance of a mixtape single track, GYPO ("Get Your Praise On"). "It is especially humbling as the video was first aired in early April and it was late April before the Android mobile app was first available to support the YouTube auto-generated playlists", said PT. "The desktop version for UCB's playlist was first generated in February indicating that GYPO was added and charted to the list sometime after its first few weeks of play."

Serving the Peace, his label and production company, entered into a two music mini-film deal with StewArt Media Studios for the Raise Up studio album singles, Understanding God, already released in October, 2014 and Salvation RMX, released in 2015. Both music mini-films were released in the second quarter of 2015 in limited viewings. Salvation RMX was an official selection of the Gwinnett Center International Film Festival in August 2015. Salvation RMX won the festivals' Audience Choice award. In the fourth quarter of 2015 into early 2016, Salvation RMX was in the top three music videos airing on streaming television's Christian Hip Hop channel.

== Acting career ==
A few months after creating entertainment company, Serving the Peace, in 2013, Stokes was approached by the mentor who had introduced him to Hit'em Hard Entertainment, about auditioning for a role in an indie film. The mentor had been asked to audition for a small role as an arresting officer in the film and thought the role was a fit for PT. Although not aiming to be an actor, conceding to the mentor's lobbying, Stokes went to audition for the role and was asked to audition for a larger role. He landed the role of Angelo, in Burning Bridges, an attorney that is key to the film's major plot twist.

In March 2014, Stokes got an uncredited role as a detective in Taken 3.

By August 2014, Stokes was in Ant-Man as a prison officer coming to Paul Rudd's ("Scott Lang/Ant-Man") rescue.

In September 2014, Stokes was asked to submit a rehearsal rate sheet and then took a dinner to discuss a project, Emerald City. Although a new showrunner and writer were later green-lighted for the project, NBC allowed PT and the original writers to continue to be attached to the project.

Stokes made a LA promotional tour during Golden Globe weekend in January 2015 which was also the same weekend as the USA premiere for Taken 3.

In March 2015, Stokes landed a voice role in the Remedy Entertainment/Microsoft Studios time bending video game/interactive television project, Quantum Break.

In June 2015, Stokes had a featured role on the TV One series, Born Again Virgin. In November 2015, he portrayed a barber, Dwight, who has a close relationship with the character Jabari, played by JD Williams, for the Bounce TV/Swirl Films church drama, Saints & Sinners.

== Awards and achievements ==
=== Gwinnett Center International Film Festival ===
Year	Film	Award	Result
2015	Salvation RMX	Audience Choice	Won
2015	Salvation RMX	Best Direction, Music Video	Nominated
2015	Salvation RMX	Best Music Video	Nominated

=== Independent Artists Christian Music Association honors ===
Year	Nominee/Work	Award	Result
2016	PT The Gospel Spitter/Salvation	Urban Holy Hip Hop Artist	Nominated
2016	PT The Gospel Spitter/Death of Atheism	New Urban Hip Hop Artist of the Year	Won

== Discography ==
Title	Album details
Raise Up	Singles released; Understanding God October 7, 2014; Salvation RMX October 23, 2015; Label: Serving the Peace; Digital streaming and stores distribution

== Filmography ==
=== Film ===
Year	Title	Role	Note
2014	Salvation RMX Live	PT The Gospel Spitter	Producer
2014	Taken 3	Detective	
2015	Understanding God	PT The Gospel Spitter	Writer, producer
2015	Ant-Man	Prison Officer	
2015	Salvation RMX	Choir Director/Preacher	Writer, director, performer
2016	Burning Bridges	Angelo	

=== Television ===
Year	Title	Role	Note
2015	Born Again Virgin	Guy at Bar	one episode, dance
2015	Satisfaction	Band Manager	
2016	Saints & Sinners	Dwight	three episodes

=== Video games ===
Year	Title	Role	Note
2016	Quantum Break	Quest Hospital Security	Voice, motion capture
