= I Got Angels =

Single by Emcee N.I.C.E.

from the album PRAISE
- Released: July 20, 2017
- Recorded: 2017
- Genre: Christian hip hop; hip hop; rhythm and blues
- Length: 3:46
- Label: Gypsy City Music
- Songwriters: Emcee N.I.C.E.; Richard Smallwood; Sam Peezy; BJ Luster
- Producers: Sam Peezy; Richard Smallwood; Steven Ford

Emcee N.I.C.E. singles chronology
"Tonight" (2016)	"I Got Angels" (2017)	"Alright" (2018)

Music video
- "I Got Angels" on YouTube

"I Got Angeles" is a single by African-American/Puerto Rican Christian Hip Hop rapper Emcee N.I.C.E. It was released on July 20, 2017. It serves as the lead single to Emcee N.I.C.E. third studio album, but first Gospel Christian Hip Hop album PRAISE (2017). The song was produced by Sam Peezy inspired by Gospel Hall of Fame Legend Richard Smallwood’s “Angels”, and features Richard Smallwood with Vision in the chorus. The single made its debut on the ”Billboard” Hot 100 Single Sales Chart at number nine and proceeded to climb to number-one as well as number-one on the Billboard Gospel Digital Song Sales Chart. Becoming Emcee N.I.C.E.'s first number-one song off of his number-one Gospel Album "PRAISE".

== Commercial performance ==
"I Got Angels" debuted at number #9 on the Billboard Hot 100 “Hot Single Sales chart” for the week of October 10, 2017. Its debut was driven by digital download and CD sales, staying on the Billboard Charts for 7 weeks from October 10, 2017 through January 6, 2018 peeking at #1 on both the Billboard Hot Single Sales & Gospel Digital Song Sales Charts 1

== Track listing ==
- Digital download
1. "I Got Angels" — 3:46
- CD
1. "I Got Angels" — 3:46

== Chart performance ==
- ”I Got Angels” spent 7 weeks on the Billboard charts, peaking at #1 on the Billboard Hot Single Sales Chart & #1 on Billboard Gospel Digital Song Sales

== Charts ==
Title	Date	Chart	Peak position
"I Got Angels"	11/04/2017	Billboard Hot Single Sales	#1
"I Got Angels"	11/17/2017	Billboard Gospel Digital Song Sales	#1

    - “I Got Angels” spent 10 weeks on the Billboard Gospel Digital Download Chart

=== Year-end charts ===
Chart (2017)	Position
US Billboard Hot Gospel Songs	46

== Music video ==
Joining in on the women’s empowerment movement along with Drake's "Nice for What" went back to his hometown of El Paso, Texas and teamed up with Producer Desiree Ramirez, a Latin African-American female filmmaker also from El Paso, whom attended New Mexico State University.
Desiree graduating from college pulled in the services of the universities creative arts media team to bring her vision across. Jumping on board was director Professor Sherwin Lau, Carlos Tejada Director of Photography and collegiate students from NMSU.

The story of "I Got Angels" begins at a pop-up church in El Paso, Texas where "Emcee N.I.C.E." is a guest speaker- there to enlighten the audience that we all got angels watching over us. The music video goes on to touch upon a couple of storylines, "bullying and loneliness", the bullying portion focuses on a kid being bullied, only to uncover the bully is bullied, symbolizing a deeper issue of where some of these issues stem from as an angel appears to enlighten both victims that angels are always present to comfort them. Another storyline presented in the music video, follows a woman with cerebral palsy who sits in the hospital by her ailing father, an Angel appears to give her comfort as the woman finds herself carrying the burden of being alone.

"I Got Angels" director of photography Carlos Tejada of NMSU shot the music video at five locations, four of them located in and around El Paso (Children's Hospital, The Venue @ Union Plaza, Chapin High School and Logan Heights) and the fifth location was (Bluff Springs) in New Mexico. Emcee N.I.C.E. also included a collection of “Chuco” town actors and actresses to be a big part of the visuals. Desiree solicited the help of First Lady Sibrena Sinegal of the Northeast Bible Fellowship, El Paso's Kids-N-Co, Youth on the Move in Christ Jesus Phase 2 Fine Arts Ministry Praise Team and Radio personality Felipe Famous Loza. "It's nothing like getting the youth involved, they are our tomorrow and it's up to us to help shape their purpose", states Emcee N.I.C.E. about working with the kids.

== Critical review ==
In his switch from the secular circuit to inspirational/gospel music, Emcee N.I.C.E. faced an uphill climb within the gospel community. “While many weren’t receptive, it was N.I.C.E.’s belief in the message in the song” that kept him pushing forward.

== Liner notes ==
- Recorded & Mixed by Orlando Gomez, El Paso, Texas Beacon Hill Recording Studios
- Emcee N.I.C.E. – Lead Vocals and Backing Vocals
- Sam Peezy – Producer
- Richard Smallwood – Original Producer
- Steven Ford – Original Producer
- Edward “DJ Cube” Harrison of ULP Productions – Remix Producer
- ”King Phillip” Harrison of ULP Productions – Remix Producer
- Distributed by Gypsy City Music
- Executive Producers – Aulsondro “Novelist” Hamilton, Frank DeRozan, BJ Luster and Tally
