= Stacey Dash =

American actress (born 1966)

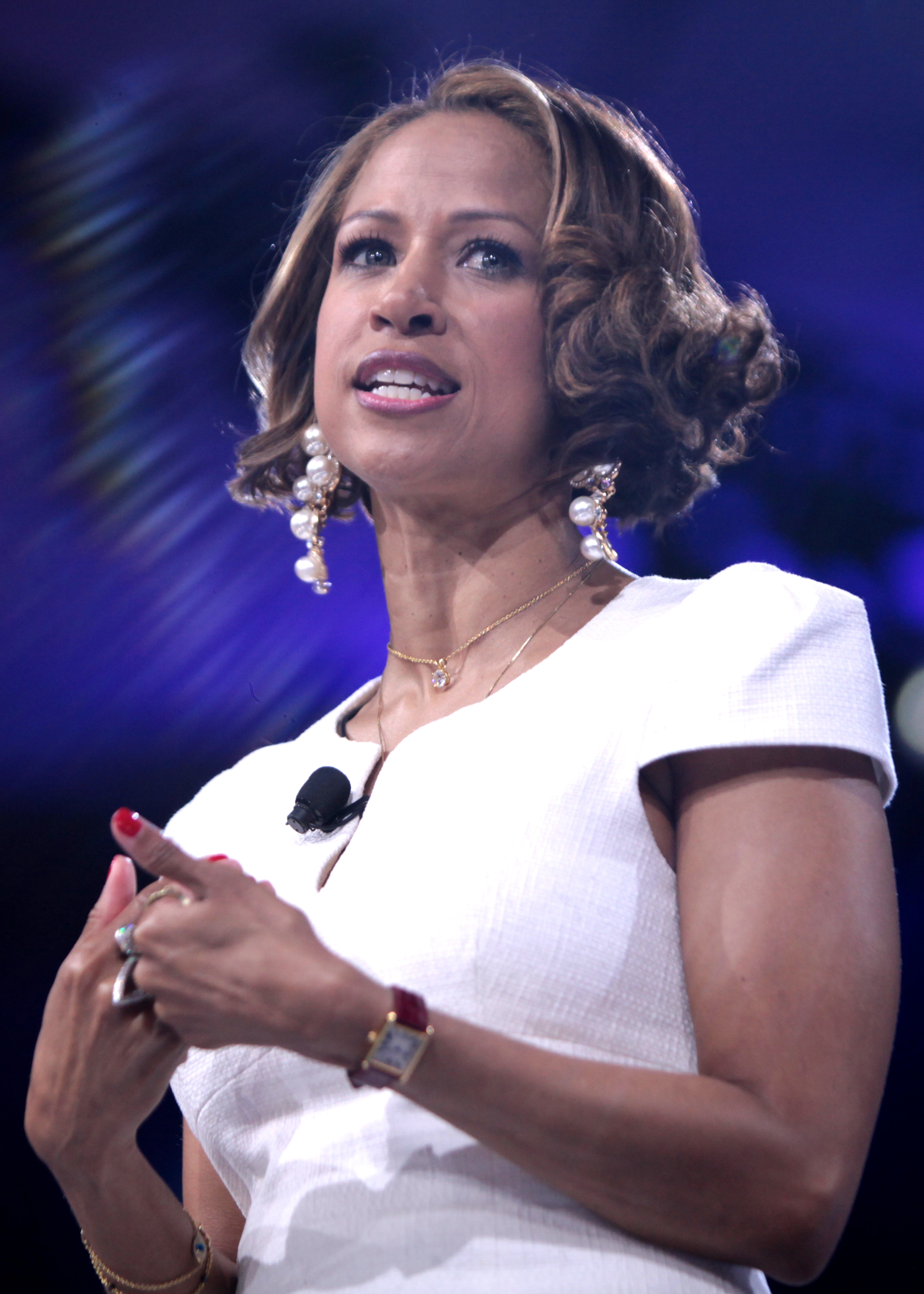
- Dash in 2016
- Born: Stacey Lauretta Dash; January 20, 1967 (age 59) (Note: or January 20, 1966 (age 60)); The Bronx, New York, U.S.
- Occupation: Actress
- Years active: 1982–present
- Known for: Mo' Money; Clueless; Renaissance Man
- Political party: Republican (2012–present)
- Other political affiliations: Democratic (2008–2012)
- Spouses: Brian Lovell (m. 1999; div. 2005) (Note: Divorced in mid-2000s; see § Personal life.) James Maby (m. 2005; div. 2006) Emmanuel Xuereb (m. 2007; div. 2011) (Note: Married in either 2007 or 2009; see § Personal life.) Jeffrey Marty (m. 2018; div. 2020)
- Children: 2
- Relatives: Dash (nephew); Damon Dash (cousin)

Stacey Lauretta Dash (born January 20, 1967) is an American actress. Dash played Dionne Marie Davenport in the 1995 feature film Clueless and its television series. She has also appeared in the films Moving, Mo' Money, Renaissance Man, and View from the Top. Other television work by Dash includes appearances in the series CSI: Crime Scene Investigation, Single Ladies and the reality TV show Celebrity Circus. She has also appeared in music videos for Carl Thomas' "Emotional" and Kanye West's "All Falls Down".

== Early life ==
Born in the Bronx borough of New York City, Dash is of African American and Mexican descent. She is the daughter of Dennis Dash and Linda Dash (née Lopez; d. 2017). Dash has a stepfather, Cecil Holmes, and a younger brother, Darien Dash, who is the founder of DME Interactive, the first publicly traded Mexican-African American-led website company. Her first cousin is Damon Dash, the former CEO and co-founder of Roc-A-Fella Records. She attended Paramus High School, graduating in 1985.

== Career ==
Dash made her first television appearance in the NBC crime drama pilot Farrell: For the People starring Valerie Harper and Ed O'Neill in 1982, which did not make it past its pilot episode. Her first notable appearance was as Michelle in the 1985 The Cosby Show episode "Denise's Friend". Dash's first substantial television role was in the 1988 series TV 101. The series was canceled after 13 episodes. Dash's first major film role was in the Richard Pryor comedy Moving in 1988. She also had sizable roles in Mo' Money and Renaissance Man during this time. In 1995, Dash starred as a femme fatale in the low-budget film Illegal in Blue. Dash received her big break with the 1995 teen comedy film Clueless. Dash played Cher's high school best friend Dionne Davenport, although Dash was twenty-eight at the time. In 1996, the film spawned a television spin-off of the same name, in which Dash reprised her role as Dionne. The series ran from 1996 to 1999.

After the television series ended, she appeared in View from the Top (2003) and smaller budget films, including Gang of Roses (2003), and Getting Played (2005). She also has appeared in small guest roles on television shows such as Eve and CSI: Crime Scene Investigation. Dash played Vanessa Weir in the television series The Strip, which was canceled after several episodes. In 2001, Dash was featured in a music video by Carl Thomas for the single "Emotional". In 2004, Dash was featured in a music video by Kanye West, label signee of her cousin Damon Dash, for the single "All Falls Down". Dash posed nude in the August 2006 issue of Playboy. Also in 2006, she was featured in singer Marques Houston's video for "Favorite Girl," and launched her own lingerie line called Letters of Marque. Between 2005 and 2007, she completed filming roles in I Could Never Be Your Woman, Nora's Hair Salon II, Fashion Victim, Ghost Image and American Primitive. For 2008 release, she filmed Phantom Punch, Secrets of a Hollywood Nurse, and Close Quarters. Dash also performed in the 2008 reality television series Celebrity Circus. Prior to the series premiere, Dash suffered a broken rib while training. Despite the injury, Dash performed on the trapeze bungee during the premiere and continued on to be a finalist. Dash finished second behind Antonio Sabàto, Jr.

Dash appeared as a recurring character on the television series The Game in early 2009. In 2011, Dash starred in the first season of VH1's first scripted series, Single Ladies, playing Valerie "Val" Stokes, described as a "'good girl' looking for a good man". On August 31, it was reported that she would leave the series in order to focus on her family. In 2012, Dash starred as Lisa, the female lead in the film Dysfunctional Friends. Also in 2012, Dash was featured in Funny or Die and YouTube broadcast trailers and shorts for her web series Stacey Dash Is Normal. The scripted series launched in 2013.

On May 28, 2014, Fox News announced that Dash had been hired as a contributor for "cultural analysis and commentary." On the December 7, 2015, edition of Outnumbered, Dash made a remark about President Barack Obama's address regarding Islamic terrorism that took place the day before, suggesting the president didn't "give a shit" about terrorism. Due to this remark, the network suspended her without pay for two weeks. In 2016, Dash received criticism when she argued that the BET Awards lied to black people about news regarding the boycotting of the Oscars due to lack of ethnic diversity, and called for an end to Black History Month. She made a cameo at the 88th Academy Awards repeating this sentiment. In addition, she criticized Jesse Williams's speech at the BET Awards. On January 21, 2017, Fox News announced that Dash's contract would not be renewed.

== Politics ==
Dash voted for Barack Obama in the 2008 U.S. presidential election. In 2012, she switched her party affiliation from Democratic to Republican and endorsed Republican presidential nominee Mitt Romney. In response to critical online comments she received for supporting Romney, Dash stated it was her opinion and that she did not understand the vitriol. Vice presidential candidate Paul Ryan thanked Dash for supporting his ticket.

Since the 2012 election, Dash has publicly expressed her political views. In April 2013, she criticized music artists Jay-Z and Beyoncé's trip to Cuba. In 2016, with regard to the debate over use of gender-specific bathrooms, she said that transgender rights "infringe upon [her own]". Dash writes a blog for Patheos.com. Dash supported Republican candidate Donald Trump in the 2016 presidential election.

On February 26, 2018, Dash filed to run in California's 44th congressional district in the 2018 Congressional Election as a Republican. On joining the race, Dash said she wanted to "free people from the shackles of a plantation mentality." Dash withdrew from the congressional race on March 30, 2018. Her name remained on the ballot for the primary because her withdrawal came after the deadline. She ended up in last place with 4,361 votes (7.2% share of the votes).

On March 11, 2021, Dash stated in an interview with Daily Mail, "Being a supporter of Trump has put me in some kind of box that I don't belong in. But he's not the president. I'm going to give the president [Joe Biden] that we have right now a chance."

== Personal life ==
=== Relationships and children ===
Dash has two children, a son named Austin, born from her relationship with singer Christopher Williams, and a daughter named Lola. In 1999, she married producer Brian Lovell and they divorced in the mid-2000s. From 2005 to 2006, Dash was married to British executive James Maby, CEO of Sports Logistics. Different sources say the father of Dash's daughter is either Lovell or Maby. Dash married actor Emmanuel Xuereb in either 2007 or 2009. She filed for divorce in January 2010. It was finalized in September 2011. Dash married lawyer Jeffrey Marty in Florida on April 6, 2018. She has said that she met Marty ten days before the wedding. In addition to her two children, Dash became a step-mother to three of Marty's children. In April 2020, Dash announced that she and Marty had separated. In June 2020, Dash filed for divorce.

=== Trauma, drugs, weapons, and legal issues ===
Dash has spoken openly about past traumas in her personal life. She has at various times revealed that she was molested as a child by a family friend, was addicted to cocaine in her teens and 20s, and has a history of being with physically and emotionally abusive partners. Dash has attributed her openness with such topics to her desire to be honest with her children, feeling that being honest is the best way to protect them, and to let them and others know that she is not a victim but a survivor. She is supportive of the right to keep and bear arms, crediting the use of a gun with saving her life after being sexually assaulted at gunpoint by an ex-boyfriend, because she was able to retrieve her own weapon, a .22 revolver, and shot at him, scaring him away.

Dash was arrested on September 29, 2019, at her apartment in Pasco County, Florida, on a domestic battery charge after an argument with her husband, Jeffrey Marty. She pleaded not guilty, and the case was dropped on October 3 at the request of Marty, who said Dash had been arrested over his objection. The couple's divorce was announced the following year.

In October 2021, Dash opened up about her Vicodin addiction on The Dr. Oz Show, stating that she was five years sober.

=== Religion ===
Dash was raised Catholic, and claimed the religion in 2012 and 2013.

== Filmography ==
=== Film ===
| Year | Title | Role | Notes |
|---|---|---|---|
| 1982 | Farrell for the People | Denise Grey | TV movie |
| 1987 | Enemy Territory | Antoinette "Toni" Briggs | |
| 1988 | Moving | Casey Pear | |
| 1989 | Tennessee Waltz | Minnie | |
| 1992 | Mo' Money | Amber Evans | |
| 1994 | Renaissance Man | Pvt. Miranda Myers | |
| 1995 | Clueless | Dionne Davenport | |
| 1995 | Illegal in Blue | Kari Truitt | Video |
| 1997 | Cold Around the Heart | Bec Rosenberg | |
| 1999 | Personals | Leah | |
| 2001 | The Painting | Hallie Gilmore at 18 | |
| 2002 | Paper Soldiers | Tamika | |
| 2003 | View from the Top | Angela Samona | |
| 2003 | Gang of Roses | Kim | |
| 2003 | Ride or Die | Real Venus | Video |
| 2005 | Lethal Eviction | Amanda Winters | |
| 2006 | Getting Played | Emily | TV movie |
| 2007 | I Could Never Be Your Woman | Brianna Minx | |
| 2007 | Ghost Image | Alicia Saunders | |
| 2008 | Christmas Break | Smokin' Woman | Short |
| 2008 | Nora's Hair Salon 2: A Cut Above | Simone | |
| 2008 | Fashion Victim | Cara Wheeler | |
| 2008 | Phantom Punch | Geraldine Liston | |
| 2008 | Secrets of a Hollywood Nurse | Reporter | TV movie |
| 2009 | Wild About Harry | Joy Crowley | |
| 2009 | Chrome Angels | Lady | |
| 2012 | Dysfunctional Friends | Lisa | |
| 2012 | House Arrest | Chanel | |
| 2013 | Blue Butterflies | Faith | Short |
| 2014 | Lap Dance | Dr. Annie Jones | |
| 2014 | Patient Killer | Nancy Peck | |
| 2015 | Cloudy with a Chance of Love | Kelly | TV movie |
| 2016 | Sharknado: The 4th Awakens | Chicago Mayor Mansfield | TV movie |
| 2016 | The Thinning | Kendra Birch | |
| 2018 | Honor Up | Tara | |
| 2019 | The Dawn | Sister Ella | |
| 2020 | First Lady | Channing | |
| 2020 | Roe v. Wade | Mildred Jefferson | |
| 2021 | Carolina's Calling | Mary Lou | |
| 2022 | 7th Secret | Miss Vivian | |
| 2022 | Corsicana | Jennie | |
| 2024 | Four. | Beth | |
| 2025 | The Doctor with Two Faces | Carol | |

=== Television ===
| Year | Title | Role | Notes |
|---|---|---|---|
| 1985 | The Cosby Show | Michelle | Episode: "Denise's Friend" |
| 1988 | St. Elsewhere | Penny Franks | Recurring Cast: Season 6 |
| 1988–89 | TV 101 | Monique | Main Cast |
| 1994 | The Fresh Prince of Bel-Air | Michelle Michaels | Episode: "When You Hit Upon a Star" |
| 1994 | Harts of the West | - | Episode: "Drive, He Said" |
| 1995 | Soul Train | Herself/Guest Host | Episode: "Shai/Maysa Leak/Mystikal" |
| 1996–99 | Clueless | Dionne "Dee" Davenport | Main Cast |
| 1998 | Penn & Teller's Sin City Spectacular | Herself | Episode: "Episode #1.9" |
| 1999–00 | The Strip | Vanessa Weir | Main Cast |
| 2001 | Going to California | Janie | Episode: "A Pirate Looks at 15 to 20" |
| 2001 | Men, Women & Dogs | Meg | Episode: "Pilot" |
| 2001 | CSI: Crime Scene Investigation | Amy Young | Episode: "Slaves of Las Vegas" |
| 2003 | Eve | Corryn | Episode: "The Ex Factor" |
| 2005 | Duck Dodgers | Paprika Solo (voice) | Episode: "Diamond Boogie/Corporate Pigfall" |
| 2008 | Celebrity Circus | Herself | Main Cast |
| 2008 | American Dad! | Janet Lewis (voice) | Episode: "Escape from Pearl Bailey" |
| 2009–11 | The Game | Camille Rose | Recurring Cast: Season 3, Guest: Season 4 |
| 2011 | Single Ladies | Valerie "Val" Stokes | Main Cast: Season 1 |
| 2013 | The Exes | Dana | Episode: "Trading Places" |
| 2014–15 | Celebrity Name Game | Herself/Celebrity Player | Episode: "Stacey Dash & Mario Lopez #1-#3" |
| 2014–17 | Outnumbered | Herself/Guest Co-Host | Recurring Co-Host |
| 2016 | Hell's Kitchen | Herself | Episode: "10 Chefs Compete Again" |
| 2016 | The Eric Andre Show | Herself | Episode: "Stacey Dash; Jack McBrayer" |
| 2020 | Finding Love in Quarantine | Theresa | Main Cast |
| 2022 | College Hill: Celebrity Edition | Herself | Main Cast: Season 1 |

=== Music videos ===
| Year | Song title | Artist |
|---|---|---|
| 1989 | "Talk to Myself" | Christopher Williams |
| 1992 | "The Best Things in Life Are Free" | Luther Vandross and Janet Jackson |
| 1997 | "That Girl" | MJG |
| 2000 | "Emotional" | Carl Thomas |
| 2004 | "All Falls Down" | Kanye West featuring Syleena Johnson |
| 2006 | "Favorite Girl" | Marques Houston |
| 2010 | "Super High" | Rick Ross featuring Ne-Yo |
| 2012 | "Life of The Party" | Emcee N.I.C.E. featuring Stacey Dash and Blake Smith |

== Books ==
Dash, Stacey (2016). There Goes My Social Life: From Clueless to Conservative. Washington, D.C.: Regnery Publishing. ISBN 9781621574132. OCLC 909538859.

== See also ==
- List of Afro-Latinos
