= The Fray discography =

Alternative rock band discography

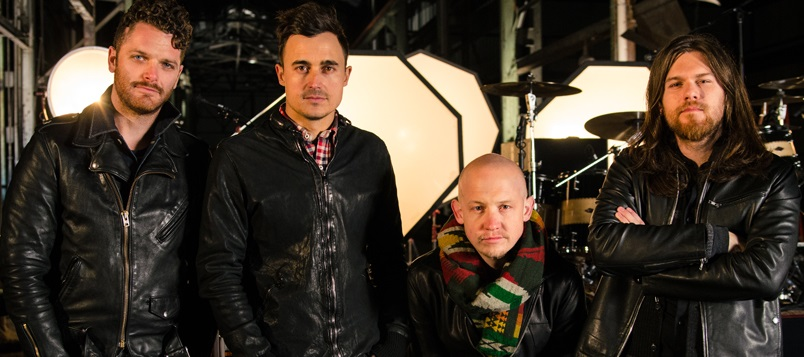
- Classic Fray lineup in 2014
- Studio albums: 5
- Extended plays: 3
- Live albums: 3
- Compilation albums: 1
- Singles: 13
- Music videos: 10
- Promotional singles: 1

The discography of the Fray, an American rock band from Colorado, consists of four studio albums, three live albums, one compilation album, five extended plays, 13 singles, one promotional single and ten music videos. The band's founding members, Isaac Slade and Joe King, met at a music store in Denver. They released two EPs that received positive coverage from local media outlets, and when listener requests for a demo for their song "Over My Head (Cable Car)" overwhelmed the Denver's radio stations, they were brought to the attention of Epic Records — to whom they signed in 2004. The Fray's debut studio album, How to Save a Life, was released in 2005. Five singles were released from the album: the first two, "Over My Head (Cable Car)" and the album's title track, both entered the top ten of the US Billboard Hot 100 and were certified triple platinum by the Recording Industry Association of America (RIAA); the latter also topped the Irish singles chart and reached number four in the United Kingdom.

The Fray's second album, The Fray featured production from Aaron Johnson and Mike Flynn, and engineering from Warren Huart. After its release in February 2009, The Fray became their first (and only) album to peak the US Billboard 200, and also reached the top ten of the Canadian and United Kingdom albums charts. Its lead single, "You Found Me", peaked at number seven on the Billboard Hot 100 and received triple platinum certification by the RIAA. It also achieved success in Australia, where it topped the singles chart and was certified double platinum by the Australian Recording Industry Association (ARIA). Three further singles – "Never Say Never", a cover of the Kanye West song "Heartless" and "Syndicate" – were also released from the album.

In 2012, The Fray released their third album, Scars & Stories, inspired by a series of trips they took to Rwanda and Germany. The title comes from an unreleased B-side previously recorded by the group. It peaked at number four on the Billboard 200 and number six in Canada, and spawned two singles: "Heartbeat", which peaked at number 42 on the Billboard Hot 100, and "Run for Your Life".

== Albums ==
=== Studio albums ===
List of studio albums, with selected chart positions, sales figures and certifications
| Title | Album details | Peak chart positions | | | | | | | | | | Sales | Certifications |
| Title | Album details | US | AUS | CAN | GER | IRL | JPN | NLD | NZ | SWI | UK | Sales | Certifications |
|---|---|---|---|---|---|---|---|---|---|---|---|---|---|
| How to Save a Life | Released: September 13, 2005 (US); Label: Epic; Formats: CD, LP, digital download | 14 | 1 | 9 | 56 | 4 | 56 | 50 | 2 | 57 | 4 | US: 2,370,000 | RIAA: 5× Platinum; ARIA: Platinum; BPI: Platinum; BVMI: Gold; IRMA: Platinum; MC: Platinum; RMNZ: 2× Platinum |
| The Fray | Released: February 3, 2009 (US); Label: Epic; Formats: CD, LP, digital download | 1 | 3 | 2 | 46 | 13 | 69 | 54 | 19 | 47 | 8 | US: 897,000 | RIAA: 2× Platinum; ARIA: Gold; BPI: Silver; MC: Gold; RMNZ: Gold |
| Scars & Stories | Released: February 7, 2012 (US); Label: Epic; Formats: CD, LP, digital download | 4 | 18 | 6 | 45 | 41 | 85 | 68 | 39 | 32 | 44 | | |
| Helios | Released: February 25, 2014 (US); Label: Epic; Formats: CD, LP, digital download | 8 | 21 | 11 | 43 | — | 126 | — | — | 48 | 51 | | |
| A Light That Waits | Released: March 13, 2026; Label: The Fray; Formats: CD, LP, digital download | — | — | — | — | — | — | — | — | — | — (Note: A Light That Waits did not enter the UK Albums Chart, but peaked at number 47 on the UK Albums Sales Chart.) | | |
"—" denotes a recording that did not chart or was not released in that territory.

=== Live albums ===
List of live albums
| Title | Album details |
|---|---|
| Live at the Electric Factory: Bootleg No. 1 | Released: July 18, 2006 (US); Label: Epic; Formats: CD, digital download |
| Acoustic in Nashville: Bootleg No. 2 | Released: September 4, 2007 (US); Label: Epic; Formats: CD, digital download |
| Live from the 9:30 Club: Bootleg No. 3 | Released: 2009 (US); Label: Epic; Formats: CD, digital download |

=== Compilation albums ===
List of compilation albums, with selected chart positions and certifications
| Title | Album details | Peak chart positions | | Certifications |
| Title | Album details | US | US Rock | Certifications |
|---|---|---|---|---|
| The Fray – The Collection | Released: March 8, 2013 (US); Label: Epic; Formats: CD, digital download | — | — | |
| Through the Years: The Best of the Fray | Released: November 4, 2016; Label: Epic; Formats: CD, digital download | 77 | 13 | BPI: Gold |
"—" denotes a recording that did not chart or was not released in that territory.

== Extended plays ==
List of extended plays
| Title | Details |
|---|---|
| Movement | Released: 2002; Label: Independent; Format: CD |
| Reason | Released: 2003; Label: Independent; Format: CD |
| iTunes Live from Soho | Released: April 7, 2009 (US); Label: Sony; Format: Digital download |
| Christmas EP | Released: December 21, 2009 (US); Format: Digital download |
| Covers | Released: August 7, 2012 (US); Format: LP |
| The Fray Is Back | Released: September 27, 2024 (US); Format: Digital download |

== Singles ==
List of singles, with selected chart positions and certifications, showing year released and album name
| Title | Year | Peak chart positions | | | | | | | | | | Certifications | Album |
| Title | Year | US | US Pop | AUS | CAN | GER | IRL | NLD | NZ | SWI | UK | Certifications | Album |
|---|---|---|---|---|---|---|---|---|---|---|---|---|---|
| "Over My Head (Cable Car)" | 2005 | 8 | 5 | 22 | 11 | 83 | 25 | 67 | 25 | 96 | 19 | RIAA: 5× Platinum; ARIA: Gold; BPI: Gold; MC: Gold; RMNZ: Platinum | How to Save a Life |
| "How to Save a Life" | 2006 | 3 | 3 | 2 | 17 | 45 | 1 | 46 | 7 | 28 | 4 | RIAA: 11× Platinum; ARIA: Platinum; BPI: 4× Platinum; BVMI: 2× Platinum; MC: Platinum; RMNZ: 5× Platinum | How to Save a Life |
| "Look After You" | 2007 | 59 | 31 | — | — | — | — | — | — | — | — | BPI: Platinum; RMNZ: Platinum | How to Save a Life |
| "All at Once" | 2007 | — | — (Note: "All at Once" did not enter the Pop Airplay chart, but peaked at number 20 on the Adult Pop Airplay chart.) | — | — | — | — | — | — | — | 175 | | How to Save a Life |
| "You Found Me" | 2008 | 7 | 6 | 1 | 12 | 73 | 4 | — (Note: "You Found Me" did not enter the Netherlands' Single Top 100 but peaked on the Netherlands' TMF Superchart at number 24.) | 18 | 63 | 35 | RIAA: 7× Platinum; ARIA: 2× Platinum; BPI: Platinum; BVMI: Gold; RMNZ: 2× Platinum | The Fray |
| "Never Say Never" | 2009 | 32 | 13 | 38 | 51 | — | — | — | — | — | 87 | RIAA: 2× Platinum; BPI: Silver; RMNZ: Gold | The Fray |
| "Heartless" | 2009 | 79 | — | — | 45 | — | — | — | — | — | — | | The Fray |
| "Syndicate" | 2010 | — (Note: "Syndicate" did not enter the Billboard Hot 100, but peaked at number eight on the Bubbling Under Hot 100 Singles chart, which acts as an extension to the Hot 100.) | 40 | — | — | — | — | — | — | — | — | | The Fray |
| "Boulder to Birmingham" (featuring Emmylou Harris) | 2010 | — | — | — | — | — | — | — | — | — | — | | Scars & Stories |
| "Heartbeat" | 2011 | 42 | 22 | 66 | 63 | — | — | — | — | — (Note: "Heartbeat" did not enter the Swiss Singles chart, but charted at number 86 on the Swiss Airplay chart.) | — | RIAA: Gold | Scars & Stories |
| "Run for Your Life" | 2012 | — | — (Note: "Run for Your Life" did not enter the Pop Airplay chart, but peaked at number 31 on the Adult Pop Airplay chart.) | 39 | — | — | — | — | — | — | — | | Scars & Stories |
| "Love Don't Die" | 2013 | 60 | — (Note: "Love Don't Die" did not enter the Pop Airplay chart, but peaked at number seven on the Adult Pop Airplay chart.) | 44 | 65 | — | — | — | — | — | — | RIAA: Gold | Helios |
| "Break Your Plans" | 2014 | — | — (Note: "Break Your Plans" did not enter the Pop Airplay chart, but peaked at number 21 on the Adult Pop Airplay chart.) | — | — | — | — | — | — | — | — | | Helios |
| "Singing Low" | 2016 | — | — (Note: "Singing Low" did not enter the Pop Airplay chart, but peaked at number 31 on the Adult Pop Airplay chart.) | — | — | — | — | — | — | — | — | | Through the Years: The Best of The Fray |
| "Time Well Wasted" | 2024 | — | — (Note: "Singing Low" did not enter the Pop Airplay chart, but peaked at number 25 on the Adult Pop Airplay chart.) | — | — | — | — | — | — | — | — | | The Fray Is Back EP |
| "My Heart's a Crowded Room" | 2025 | — | — | — | — | — | — | — | — | — | — | | A Light That Waits |
| "Emerald" | 2025 | — | — | — | — | — | — | — | — | — | — | | A Light That Waits |
| "Songs I'd Rather Not Sing" | 2025 | — | — | — | — | — | — | — | — | — | — | | A Light That Waits |
| "A Light That Waits" | 2026 | — | — | — | — | — | — | — | — | — | — | | A Light That Waits |
"—" denotes a recording that did not chart or was not released in that territory.

=== Promotional singles ===
List of promotional singles, with selected chart positions, showing year released and album name
| Title | Year | Peak chart positions | | Album |
| Title | Year | US | US Pop | Album |
|---|---|---|---|---|
| "Happy Xmas (War Is Over)" | 2006 | 50 | 41 | Non-album single |
| "Hurricane" | 2014 | — | — | Helios |
| "Don't Look Down" | 2024 | — | — | The Fray Is Back EP |

== Other charted songs ==
List of other charted songs, with selected chart positions, showing year released and album name
| Title | Year | Peak chart positions | | | Album |
| Title | Year | US | US Rock | AUS | Album |
|---|---|---|---|---|---|
| "She Is" | 2005 | — | — | 80 | How to Save a Life |
| "Absolute" | 2009 | 70 | — | — | The Fray |
| "Happiness" | 2009 | — | — (Note: "Happiness" did not enter the Rock Songs chart, but peaked at number 24 on the Rock Streaming chart.) | — | The Fray |
| "Undertow" (Timbaland featuring The Fray and Esthero) | 2009 | 100 | — | — | Shock Value II |
| "The Fighter" | 2012 | — (Note: "The Fighter" did not enter the Billboard Hot 100, but peaked at number nine on the Bubbling Under Hot 100 Singles chart, which acts as an extension to the Hot 100.) | — (Note: "The Fighter" did not enter the Rock Songs chart, but peaked at number 16 on the Rock Digital Songs chart.) | — | Scars & Stories |
| "Be Still" | 2012 | — | — (Note: "Be Still" did not enter the Rock Songs chart, but peaked at number 11 on the Rock Digital Songs chart.) | — | Scars & Stories |
"—" denotes a recording that did not chart or was not released in that territory.

== Guest appearances ==
List of non-single guest appearances, with other performing artists, showing year released and album name
| Title | Year | Other artist(s) | Album |
|---|---|---|---|
| "Undertow" | 2009 | Timbaland, Esthero | Shock Value II |
| "Mahna Mahna" | 2011 | none | Muppets: The Green Album |
| "Take Your Time" | 2011 | none | Listen to Me: Buddy Holly |
| "Tryin' to Throw Your Arms Around the World" | 2011 | none | AHK-toong BAY-bi Covered |
| "Forever More" | 2012 | DJ Fresh, Professor Green | Nextlevelism |

== Music videos ==
List of music videos, with directors, showing year released
| Title | Year | Director(s) |
|---|---|---|
| "Over My Head (Cable Car)" | 2005 | Elliott Lester |
| "How to Save a Life" (version 1) | 2006 | Sam Brown |
| "How to Save a Life" (version 2) | 2006 | Mark Pellington |
| "All at Once" | 2007 | Rod Blackhurst |
| "You Found Me" | 2008 | Josh Forbes |
| "Never Say Never" | 2009 | Ace Norton |
| "Heartless" | 2009 | Hiro Murai |
| "Syndicate" | 2010 | Mark Pellington |
| "Heartbeat" | 2011 | Justin Francis |
| "Run for Your Life" | 2012 | Declan Whitebloom |
| "Love Don't Die" | 2013 | Nathan Cox |
| "Break Your Plans" | 2014 | Isaac Slade |
| "Time Well Wasted" | 2024 | Unknown |
| "Don't Look Down" | 2024 | Unknown |
| "Angeleno Moon" | 2024 | Unknown |
| "Same Thing" | 2024 | Unknown |
| "Not Now" | 2024 | Unknown |
