= Through the Years: The Best of the Fray =

Greatest hits album by The Fray
- Released: November 4, 2016
- Recorded: 2005–2016
- Genres: Pop rock; alternative rock
- Length: 47:24
- Label: Epic
- Producers: Mike Flynn; Aaron Johnson; Brendan O'Brien; Stuart Price; Ryan Tedder

The Fray chronology
Helios (2014)	Through the Years: The Best of the Fray (2016)	The Fray Is Back (2024)

Singles from Through the Years: The Best of the Fray
- 1. "Singing Low" Released: September 9, 2016

Professional ratings
Review scores
Source	Rating
AllMusic	3.5/5 stars

Through the Years: The Best of the Fray is a greatest hits compilation album by American rock band the Fray. The album consists of nine songs from the band's previous albums, and three new songs; one of the new songs, "Singing Low", was released as a single on September 9, 2016, in promotion of the album.

This was the Fray's final release with Epic Records as well as the final release with Isaac Slade before he left the band in 2022.

== Track listing ==
No.	Title	Length
1.	"Over My Head (Cable Car)" (from How to Save a Life, 2005)	3:58
2.	"How to Save a Life" (from How to Save a Life)	4:24
3.	"Look After You" (from How to Save a Life)	4:28
4.	"All at Once" (from How to Save a Life)	3:48
5.	"You Found Me" (from The Fray, 2008)	4:03
6.	"Never Say Never" (from The Fray)	4:17
7.	"Heartless"	4:15
8.	"Heartbeat" (from Scars & Stories, 2011)	3:41
9.	"Love Don't Die" (from Helios, 2013)	3:05
10.	"Singing Low"	4:24
11.	"Corners"	3:32
12.	"Changing Tides"	3:29

== Charts ==
Chart (2016)	Peak position
US Billboard 200	77
US Top Rock Albums (Billboard)	13

== Certifications ==
Region	Certification	Certified units/sales
United Kingdom (BPI)	Gold	100,000^{‡}
^{‡} Sales+streaming figures based on certification alone.
