= Live at the Electric Factory: Bootleg No. 1 =

Live at The Electric Factory Bootleg, No. 1

Live album by The Fray
- Released: July 18, 2006
- Genre: Alternative rock, pop rock
- Length: 54:10
- Label: Sony BMG Music Entertainment

The Fray chronology
How to Save a Life (2005)	Live at The Electric Factory Bootleg, No. 1 (2006)	Acoustic in Nashville: Bootleg No. 2 (2007)

Live at the Electric Factory is the first live CD from Denver-based rock band the Fray, available on iTunes as well as at select indie stores. It was recorded at the Electric Factory in Philadelphia and released on July 18, 2006.

== Track listing ==
1. "How To Save A Life" – 4:41
2. "She Is" – 4:16
3. "All at Once" – 4:02
4. "Chips and Salsa" – 0:36
5. "Heaven Forbid" – 4:17
6. "Interlude I" – 0:48
7. "Vienna" – 5:31
8. "Dead Wrong" – 3:32
9. "It's Not Easy Being Skinny" – 0:36
10. "Over My Head (Cable Car)" – 4:20
11. "Interlude II" – 0:25
12. "Look After You" – 7:27
13. "Trust Me" – 13:32
