= Acoustic in Nashville: Bootleg No. 2 =

Acoustic in Nashville – Bootleg No. 2

Live album by The Fray
- Released: September 4, 2007
- Recorded: December 8, 2006
- Genre: Alternative rock, pop rock
- Label: Sony BMG Music Entertainment
- Producer: Mike Flynn

The Fray chronology
Live at the Electric Factory: Bootleg No. 1 (2006)	Acoustic in Nashville – Bootleg No. 2 (2007)	The Fray (2009)

Acoustic In Nashville – Bootleg No. 2 is the second live album by Denver-based rock band the Fray, available on iTunes as well as at some indie stores. It was recorded live in Nashville, Tennessee, in mid-December 2006, and released on September 4, 2007. It features never-before-released acoustic versions of "Look After You", "She Is", "Vienna", "How To Save A Life" and "Heaven Forbid".

== Track listing ==
All tracks are written by Isaac Slade and Joe King, except where noted.

No.	Title	Length
1.	"Look After You"	4:55
2.	"She Is"	3:49
3.	"Vienna" (Isaac Slade, Joe King and Daniel Battenhouse)	4:07
4.	"How to Save a Life"	4:31
5.	"Heaven Forbid"	4:15

== Personnel ==
- Isaac Slade - Piano/Vocals
- Joe King - Guitar/Vocals
- Dave Welsh - Guitar
- Ben Wysocki - Drums
- James Stofer - Bass
- Kristin Wilkinson - Viola
- David Angell - Violin
- David Davidson - Violin
- John Catchings - Cello
- Strings arranged by Suzy Katayama
