= Scars & Stories =

Studio album by the Fray
- Released: February 7, 2012
- Recorded: March–June 2011
- Studios: Blackbird (Nashville, Tennessee); Candyland (Denver, Colorado)
- Genres: Alternative rock; pop rock; soft rock
- Length: 45:04
- Label: Epic
- Producer: Brendan O'Brien

The Fray chronology
Christmas EP (2009)	Scars & Stories (2012)	Helios (2014)

Singles from Scars & Stories
- 1. "Heartbeat" Released: October 11, 2011; 2. "Run for Your Life" Released: March 11, 2012

Scars & Stories is the third studio album by American alternative rock band the Fray. It was released on February 7, 2012.

== Background ==
Scars & Stories was recorded beginning in March 2011, and concluded in July 2011. Unlike their debut album How to Save a Life and their self-titled second album, which were both produced by Aaron Johnson and Mike Flynn, their third album was produced by Brendan O'Brien. During a performance at the Hard rock cafe in Boston, Massachusetts, Isaac Slade stated that the album Scars & Stories was named after a B-side that did not make it onto the third record. He went on to explain that each of the band members have been through a lot of hardships, but collectively they were able to pull through.

"We've been through a lot of stuff personally, and as band we're still together, and I think we like the idea of scars you know, because they're healed you know. They are not like wounds necessarily, but they're still kind of a road map of where you been, and sometimes kinda point to where you want to go."

The album artwork was revealed on November 16, 2011; following the video premiere of the first single, Heartbeat.

The album was made available to pre-order on October 18, 2011 on the band's website. On December 20, 2011 the deluxe edition of the album became available for pre-order on iTunes, featuring 5 bonus tracks; all covers. In addition, the band made the single "The Fighter" available for download.

== Writing and recording ==
During an interview with Vevo the band revealed that they used part of the album's budget to travel and see the world before writing and recording songs for Scars and Stories. The band wrote over 70 songs, and narrowed it down to what they hoped were the [best 12 songs], most of which were heavily influenced by their travels abroad. For instance, the first single "Heartbeat" was inspired by a trip to Rwanda. Slade talked about his encounter with an expatriate woman who was talking about the genocides in Rwanda. In the midst of their conversation she held his hand, and he could feel a pulse, but was unable to tell if it was his pulse or hers.

Also the song the sixth track titled "1961", personifies the Berlin Wall, as two brothers that are at odds with each other:

"We wrote that song about The Berlin Wall and the division it represented in regards to one unified city becoming two cities still under the covering of a country. They're both German, but in a sense, they were as far from each other as they could possibly be. I think that's how our relationships can be sometimes. Not to sound cliché, but we all as people build these walls that don't really come down until someone comes into our lives, tears them down, and says, 'Enough!'"

In addition the eight track on the album titled "Munich" follows the same mode of inspiration, as it is inspired by a particle collider in Switzerland. During an interview Slade mentions that "...they're looking for the God Particle, basically, the particle that holds it all together. That song is really just about the mystery of why we're all here and what's holding it all together, you know?"

"Scars & Stories may be nothing more than a pleasant retread of The Fray’s established style, but it does a commendable job of delivering quality in lieu of novelty. Every element of the band’s back catalogue can be found here, polished and presented just differently enough to give long time fans a reason to get excited. The record starts strong and gets stronger, with some of its best offerings coming at the back end of the album’s run time. The result is a record that, while admittedly comfortable in its lateral movement, continually improves until you feel like you have grown with it. There is just this overwhelming presence of worthwhile material – and a sheer surplus of catchiness – that enables Scars & Stories to unravel gradually and gracefully. So if a change in approach means looking towards greener pastures, then The Fray stand stubbornly within their established empire – and they deliver one hell of a defense."

— Sputnikmusic's review of the album.

Joe King explained "You pull from different locations and places. There’s the cultures and the different people you meet living life...You have to live life, you have to have experiences in order to be able to write stories.” Such stories served as the inspiration for the tenth track entitled "48 To Go". During an interview with Jim Shearer on VH1's Big Morning Buzz Live Slade revealed that inspiration for this song came from a road trip he and his wife, Anna took (while they were just dating) from Denver, Colorado to Los Angeles. During the road trip they stopped multiple times to "make-out"; as a result they became lost and ended up 600 miles off course; as Isaac Slade put it "...[we were] two states in and forty-eight states to go".

During a performance at the University at Buffalo, Isaac Slade mentions that he wrote the song "The Fighter" while on a "getaway" in a cottage, located in the mountains of Colorado. The song was inspired by a picture called "Strictly a Sharpshooter" by Norman Rockwell that he saw in a book he purchased. The painting depicts a boxer who has succumbed to his opponent, and a female companion by his side.

== Reception ==
=== Commercial performance ===
Scars & Stories debuted at number 4 on the Billboard 200 charts, with first-week sales of 87,000 copies.

=== Critical reception ===
Professional ratings
Aggregate scores
Source	Rating
Metacritic	(56/100)
Review scores
Source	Rating
Absolute Punk	(7.5/10)
Allmusic	3/5 stars
American Songwriter	3.5/5 stars
The A.V. Club	(D)
Billboard	(favorable)
Entertainment Weekly	(C+)
Rolling Stone	2/5 stars
Sputnikmusic	3.5/5 stars

Upon its release, the album received generally mixed reviews from music critics, and holds a Metacritic score of 55/100, indicating "generally mixed reviews". Stephen Thomas Erlewine from Allmusic gave to the album three stars out of five and opined that "O'Brien helps them articulate their ideas, giving them definition and muscle, attributes that are appealing when the songs lack distinct hooks. A positive review came from Ryan Gardner writer of Absolute Punk, he stated that they "definitely take a different approach this time around, welcoming producer Brendan O’Brien to the boards, which brings a more rock and roll sound to this record." He concluded the review, examining that "As Scars & Stories comes to a close, it sums up everything The Fray have been about the past seven years. While they don’t throw any curveballs or stir the pot too much, the band definitely stays true to their core, crafting yet another memorable piano pop-rock record with these stories." Rusty Redden wrote a positive review for American Songwriter, praising the album for being their "most-produced and boldest album yet." He also mentioned that the band "achieves a bigger sounding record as Coldplay or Switchfoot, but does so in a way that is unmistakably their own." Sputnikmusic's review was also positive, saying that the album "chooses to defend the band’s empire instead of pushing towards newer and greener pastures." Billboard's Gary Greff wrote that the album "pushes things perceptibly forward." The A.V. Club gave a negative review, saying "Ultimately, these mid-tempo, mid-volume tunes flounder in mediocrity." Jon Dolan, reviewing for Rolling Stone magazine, gave a similar review, stating "They're still pumping American-Coldplay ballads full of sky-groping choruses and symphonic rushes." He went on to pan the lyrics, saying "If it were a Lonely Island parody of an earnest rock band it'd be kind of funny. Unfortunately, the Fray are terrifyingly serious." and gave the album 2 stars out of 5.

Melissa Maerz wrote a mixed review for Entertainment Weekly that the band is "too serious" and that "even producer Brendan O'Brien can't save Scars & Stories from generic TV-soundtrack mediocrity."

== Singles ==
The lead single from the album is titled "Heartbeat". It was released to radio October 8, 2011, and surfaced online via radio music ripping. Shortly after it was officially released for download on October 11, 2011.

The music video for the second single, "Run for Your Life" was released on March 11, 2012.

== Track listing ==
No.	Title	Writer(s)	Length
1.	"Heartbeat"	Isaac Slade; Joseph King	3:41
2.	"The Fighter"	Slade; King; David Welsh; Ben Wysocki	4:20
3.	"Turn Me On"	Slade; King; Welsh; Wysocki	3:03
4.	"Run for Your Life"	Slade; King	3:59
5.	"The Wind"	Slade; King; Welsh; Wysocki	4:15
6.	"1961"	Slade; King	3:54
7.	"I Can Barely Say"	Slade; King	4:20
8.	"Munich"	Slade; King; Welsh; Wysocki	3:57
9.	"Here We Are"	Slade; King; Welsh; Wysocki	3:32
10.	"48 to Go"	Slade; King; Welsh; Wysocki	3:23
11.	"Rainy Zurich"	Slade; King	3:48
12.	"Be Still"	Slade; King; Welsh; Wysocki	2:49
Total length:			45:04

iTunes deluxe edition bonus tracks (all cover songs)
No.	Title	Originally recorded by	Length
13.	"Maps"	Yeah Yeah Yeahs	3:18
14.	"Ready or Not" (featuring Stacie Orrico)	The Fugees	3:50
15.	"Why"	Annie Lennox	4:00
16.	"Boulder to Birmingham" (featuring Emmylou Harris)	Emmylou Harris	5:07
17.	"Streets of Philadelphia"	Bruce Springsteen	3:49

Wal-Mart Exclusive bonus tracks
No.	Title	Length
13.	"Heartbeat" (Wal-Mart Soundcheck performance)
14.	"You Found Me" (Wal-Mart Soundcheck performance)
15.	"Run for Your Life" (Wal-Mart Soundcheck performance)
16.	"Turn Me On" (Wal-Mart Soundcheck performance)
17.	"The Wind" (Wal-Mart Soundcheck performance)

Target bonus tracks
No.	Title	Length
13.	"Streets of Philadelphia (Bruce Springsteen cover)" (acoustic)
14.	"The Fighter" (live)
15.	"You Found Me" (live)
16.	"How to Save a Life" (live)

Japanese bonus tracks
No.	Title	Length
13.	"The Fighter" (live at Filmore)
14.	"Streets of Philadelphia (Bruce Springsteen cover)" (acoustic version)

== Personnel ==
The Fray

- Isaac Slade – lead vocals, acoustic piano, rhythm guitar on "Munich"
- Dave Welsh – lead guitars, bass guitar
- Joe King – rhythm guitars, backing vocals, lead vocals on "Rainy Zurich", bass guitar
- Ben Wysocki – drums, percussion

Additional Musicians

- The Ann Marie Simpson Orchestra – strings on "1961" and "Munich", orchestra on "I Can Barely Say"
- Michael Einziger – string arrangements on "1961" and "Munich"
- David Campbell – orchestra arrangements on "I Can Barely Say"

== Production ==
- Brendan O'Brien – producer, mixing
- Tom Syrowski – recording
- Billy Bowers – additional engineer
- Kevin Mills – second engineer
- Lowell Reynolds – second engineer
- Warren Huart – additional recording (7, 11)
- Joe Richmond – additional recording (7, 11, 12)
- Mike Flynn – A&R
- Morgan O'Malley – A&R coordinator
- Jill Gunn – production coordinator
- Jackie O'Brien – production coordinator
- Marke Johnson – art direction, design, layout
- Nathan Johnson – art direction, design, layout
- Danny Clinch – photography

Studios

- Recorded at Blackbird Studio (Nashville, Tennessee)
- Additional recording at Candyland Studios (Denver, Colorado)
- Mixed at Henson Recording Studios (Hollywood, California)

== Charts ==
=== Weekly charts ===
Chart (2012)	Peak position
Australian Albums (ARIA)	18
Canadian Albums (Billboard)	6
Dutch Albums (Album Top 100)	68
German Albums (Offizielle Top 100)	45
Irish Albums (IRMA)	41
New Zealand Albums (RMNZ)	39
Scottish Albums (Official Charts)	47
Swiss Albums (Schweizer Hitparade)	32
UK Albums (Official Charts)	44
US Billboard 200	4
US Top Rock Albums (Billboard)	2

=== Year-end charts ===
Chart (2012)	Position
US Billboard 200	148
US Top Rock Albums (Billboard)	43
