= Run for Your Life (The Fray song) =

Single by The Fray

from the album Scars & Stories
- Released: March 11, 2012
- Recorded: 2011; Nashville, Tennessee
- Genre: Rock, pop rock, alternative rock
- Length: 3:59
- Label: Epic
- Songwriters: Isaac Slade, Joe King
- Producer: Brendan O'Brien

The Fray singles chronology
"Heartbeat" (2011)	"Run for Your Life" (2012)	"Love Don't Die" (2013)

"Run for Your Life" is a song by American rock band the Fray, released by Epic Records on March 11, 2012 as the second single from their third album Scars & Stories (2012). The accompanying music video was released the same day.

== Background ==
Singer Isaac Slade and guitarist Joe King penned this song in a remote studio in Leipers Fork, just outside Nashville. Slade told the story of the song to Denver Westword: "This one came from thin air... We started with this idea of twins, two sisters, one makes it one doesn't. We really wrote it about the one that is left, the survivor, who's sort of wracked with guilt, like 'Why me?' We kind of put it in contrast to this African concept of Sankofa. It's basically this concept of: If your village burns down, go back to it and pick through the ashes and find anything good and then take it with you and leave and never look back. It's like an acknowledgment of tragedy and hardship, alongside celebration, almost, and thankfulness for what you have. Kind of run as fast as you can from that black hole of guilt."

== Music video ==
The video begins with several people, including the band members, looking at the ground and dirt as if something was there before. All of them are alone in their respective places. Some of them begin to run through their empty surroundings. Some of them simply look up, as if gaining hope. The runners soon meet with the others, and they all begin to run behind the band members as the sun sets.

== Charts ==
Chart (2012)	Peak position
Australia (ARIA)	39
US Adult Top 40 (Billboard)	31
