= Helios (album) =

Studio album by The Fray
- Released: February 25, 2014
- Recorded: June–Fall 2013
- Genre: Pop rock; alternative rock
- Length: 42:19
- Label: Epic
- Producer: Stuart Price; Ryan Tedder

The Fray chronology
Scars & Stories (2012)	Helios (2014)	Through the Years: The Best of the Fray (2016)

Singles from Helios
- 1. "Love Don't Die" Released: October 15, 2013; 2. "Hurricane" Released: January 14, 2014; 3. "Break Your Plans" Released: May 9, 2014

Helios is the fourth studio album by American rock band the Fray. It was released on February 25, 2014, by Epic Records.

== Background and release ==
The Fray's third album, Scars and Stories, was released in February 2012. In an October 2012 interview with Rolling Stone magazine, frontman Isaac Slade said that the band would be starting work on their fourth album in 2013, aiming to release it around Christmas 2013. On June 4, 2013, the band announced that they had begun recording their fourth album. The album was made available for pre-order on iTunes on November 25, 2013, and was scheduled to be released on January 14, 2014, However, the release date had been pushed back and the album premiered on February 25, 2014.

This was the band's final studio album with Isaac Slade before his departure in 2022.

== Singles ==
The album's lead single "Love Don't Die" was released on October 21, 2013. It was released to radio on October 22, 2013. On May 9, 2014, the band announced on their Twitter page that the second single of the album is "Break Your Plans".

== Critical reception ==
Professional ratings
Review scores
Source	Rating
AllMusic	2.5/5 stars
CCM Magazine	3/5 stars
PopMatters	6/10 discs

Upon its release, Helios received generally mixed reviews from music critics. Kevin Catchpole from PopMatters gave the album six out of ten discs, commenting that "the disappointing thing is how slight moments of innovation appear for fleeting seconds only, then disappear into the ether. It suggests a band that is capable of so much more, if only it wanted to try." Andy Argyrakis of CCM Magazine rated the album three stars out of five, remarking how the release contains "plenty of uplifting and contemplative lyrics", yet their "signature piano pop surfaces on occasion, there seems to be a gravitation toward gang-styled choruses and massive electronic beats, which sometimes succeed, but periodically appear too derivative of today's top 40."

James Christopher Monger from Allmusic gave the album two-and-a-half out of five stars, indicating how that "Helios begins innocuously enough with 'Hold My Hand,' a straight-up, anthem generator-spawned arm-waver that pairs a safe, circular, entirely familiar chord progression with a melody that returns the favor (a description that applies to most if not all of the ten songs that follow), before unleashing the album's first single, 'Love Don't Die,' a digitized boot-stomper that leans hard on the Kings of Leon/Black Keys side of the Fray spectrum. Flirtations with disco ('Give It Away') and pure Killers-cloned electro-pop ('Hurricane') follow, but the Fray never sound as comfortable as they do when they're dishing out relatively generic yet undeniably impassioned slabs of Springsteen, Train, Goo Goo Dolls, and Coldplay-inspired, open-highway treacle like 'Our Last Days' and 'Wherever This Goes'."

== Track listing ==
- All songs produced by Stuart Price, "Love Don't Die" produced by Price and Ryan Tedder.

No.	Title	Writer(s)	Length
1.	"Hold My Hand"	The Fray; busbee	3:41
2.	"Love Don't Die"	The Fray; Ryan Tedder	3:03
3.	"Give It Away"	The Fray; busbee	3:21
4.	"Closer to Me"	The Fray; Matthew Thiessen	2:47
5.	"Hurricane"	The Fray; Matt Hales	3:48
6.	"Keep On Wanting"	The Fray; Brett James	4:41
7.	"Our Last Days"	The Fray; busbee	3:39
8.	"Break Your Plans"	The Fray; Joakim Berg; Carl Falk; Wayne Hector; Rami Yacoub	3:47
9.	"Wherever This Goes"	The Fray; Thiessen	3:38
10.	"Shadow and a Dancer"	The Fray; Thiessen	4:48
11.	"Same as You"	The Fray; Sam Hollander	5:06

Japanese bonus tracks
No.	Title	Length
12.	"Winter Sun"	3:04
13.	"500,000 Acres"	3:18

== Personnel ==
The Fray

- Isaac Slade – lead vocals, piano
- Dave Welsh – lead guitar, bass guitar
- Joe King – rhythm guitar, backing vocals, bass guitar
- Ben Wysocki – drums, percussion,

Technical personnel

- Stuart Price – production, mixing, mastering, engineering
- Ryan Tedder – production, mixing, mastering, engineering (track 2)

== Charts ==
Chart (2014)	Peak position
Australian Albums (ARIA)	21
Austrian Albums (Ö3 Austria)	42
Belgian Albums (Ultratop Flanders)	200
Belgian Albums (Ultratop Wallonia)	139
Canadian Albums (Billboard)	11
German Albums (Offizielle Top 100)	43
Japanese Albums (Oricon)	126
South Korean Albums (Circle)	83
Scottish Albums (OCC)	58
Spanish Albums (Promusicae)	79
Swiss Albums (Schweizer Hitparade)	79
UK Albums (OCC)	51
US Billboard 200	8
US Top Rock Albums (Billboard)	2
