= How to Save a Life (disambiguation) =

"How to Save a Life" is a 2006 song by The Fray.

How to Save a Life may also refer to:

- How to Save a Life (album), a 2005 album by The Fray (named after the above song)
- "How to Save a Life" (Grey's Anatomy), a 2015 episode of Grey's Anatomy
- How to Save a Life, a 2011 novel by Sara Zarr

== See also ==
- To Save a Life, a 2009 Christian drama film
- Lifesaving
