= All at Once (The Fray song) =

Single by The Fray

from the album How to Save a Life
- Released: June 2007
- Recorded: Bloomington, Indiana
- Genre: Pop rock; alternative rock
- Length: 3:48
- Label: Epic
- Songwriters: Isaac Slade; Joe King; Aaron Johnson
- Producers: Aaron Johnson; Mike Flynn

The Fray singles chronology
"Look After You" (2007)	"All at Once" (2007)	"You Found Me" (2008)

"All at Once" is a song by Denver-based rock band the Fray and is the fourth track and fourth single from their debut album, How to Save a Life.

== Music video ==
The music video for the song premiered on VH1's VSpot Top 20 Countdown. It consists of live footage of the band playing the song, as well as miscellaneous footage of the band on the road. Footage was shot for the video at the band's June 23 show at the Tweeter Center in Mansfield, Massachusetts.

The video reached #6 on the VH1 Top 20 Video Countdown.

== Chart performance ==
Although the song had not yet been released as a single, it charted for national airplay, entering Billboard magazine's Hot Adult Top 40 Tracks chart in June 2007. The song lasted 18 weeks on the chart and peaked at #20.

== Chart positions ==
Chart (2007)	Peak position
Slovakia Airplay (ČNS IFPI)	80
UK Singles (The Official Charts Company)	175
US Adult Pop Airplay (Billboard)	20
