= You Found Me =

2008 single by The Fray

Single by the Fray

from the album The Fray
- B-side: "The Great Beyond"
- Released: November 21, 2008
- Studio: Record Plant (Sausalito, California)
- Length: 4:04
- Label: Epic
- Songwriters: Isaac Slade, Joe King
- Producers: Aaron Johnson, Mike Flynn

The Fray singles chronology
"All at Once" (2007)	"You Found Me" (2008)	"Never Say Never" (2009)

"You Found Me" is a song by American rock band the Fray. It was released in November 2008 as the lead single from their eponymous second studio album. Live performances of the song from concerts in Europe surfaced on YouTube in late 2007, when the song was titled "Amistad". The band began streaming the song on their website on November 21, 2008. The single was digitally released in the U.S., Canadian, UK, Australian and French iTunes Stores and had a physical release later on.

The song became the group's third single to sell 2 million downloads in the United States, after "How to Save a Life" and "Over My Head (Cable Car)".

It has sold 3.6 million copies in the US as of February 2015, making it one of the most downloaded rock songs. The single was certified double platinum by the RIAA and the ARIA in 2009.

The song was nominated for a Choice Music: Rock Track award at the 2009 Teen Choice Awards.

The song was ranked No. 13 on the Hot 100 Songs of 2009 list and No. 36 on Billboard's Best Adult Pop Songs of the Decade list. It was also ranked No. 42 on Billboard's Top 100 Digital Tracks of the Decade list and No. 61 on the ARIA's list of the Top 100 Tracks of the Decade.

== Background and writing ==
Prior to its official release, the song was first performed live on November 9, 2007, where it was known as "Amistad" and featured slightly darker lyrics from the final version.

In a Reuters article about the album, Slade stated that the lyrics for "You Found Me" were written in 2007, and that the song asks about the problem of evil, why bad things happen to good people, after some of their friends and family went through very tough times.

In an interview, lead singer and pianist Isaac Slade expressed his meaning behind the lyrics of the song:

"'You Found Me' is such a great song you should really listen to it. I love it as if it were my own child. The heart ache, the let down that comes with life. Sometimes you're let down, sometimes you're the one who lets someone else down. It gets hard to know who you can trust, who you can count on. This song came out of a tough time, and I'm still right in the thick of it. There's some difficult circumstances my family and friends have been going through over the past year or so and it can be overwhelming. It wears on me. It demands so much of my faith to keep believing, keep hoping in the unseen. Sometimes the tunnel has a light at the end, but usually they just look black as night. This song is about that feeling, and the hope that I still have, buried deep in my chest."

In another interview Isaac Slade declared that:

"I kept getting these phone calls from home – tragedy after tragedy... If there is some kind of Person in charge of this planet – are they sleeping? Smoking? Where are they? I just imagined running into God standing on a street corner like Bruce Springsteen, smoking a cigarette, and I'd have it out with Him."

== Chart performance ==
"You Found Me" debuted at number 28 on the Billboard Hot 100, making it the band's highest debut on the chart to date. On February 7, 2009, issue of Billboard magazine, the single jumped to number eight on the strength of a 91% digital single sales increase from the previous week and steady airplay gains on several radio formats, becoming the Fray's third Billboard Hot 100 top ten hit after "Over My Head (Cable Car)" and "How to Save a Life". It peaked at number seven, their second highest peaking song on the chart. On the Hot Adult Top 40 Tracks chart, the song reached number one, making it their third top five hit and second number one on that chart. The song reached 3 million in downloads in the US by October 2011, and has sold 3.6 million copies as of January 2015.

On the Canadian Hot 100 it debuted at number 51, and jumped to number 13 the following week also based on sales strength and would go on to peak at number 12 in mid-February. In the United Kingdom, the song reached number 35.

In its first week on the Australian ARIA Singles Chart, the song debuted at number 998 and peaked at number one. It marks the Fray's first ever number-one song in Australia and second top-ten hit after "How to Save a Life". The Fray held this spot for four weeks until Flo Rida's "Right Round" knocked it off the top spot. More than two and a half years since exiting the ARIA Top 50, it returned to the chart at No. 50 for the week starting November 28, 2011, on the back of The X Factor Australia runner-up Andrew Wishart collaborated with the Fray on the show's grand finale.

== B-side ==
The B-side track to the single is a cover of R.E.M.'s "The Great Beyond". The track was originally covered for BBC Radio 1's compilation album, Radio 1 Established 1967, in which 40 artists were asked to cover a song for each year from 1967 to 2007 to celebrate the station's 40th anniversary.

== Music video ==
The video was shot in Chicago with Josh Forbes as the director and premiered on January 10, 2009, on VH1 and on the VH1 website. The video was inspired by Wim Wenders' film Wings of Desire. It depicts scenes of the band members in different roles- playing the song on a steel bridge, unknown people, and the members of the band are standing on top of skyscrapers looking towards the sky, and at a car accident at which the band oversees those involved, somehow being their own "guardian angel". The video ends with all material objects being lifted into the air.

== Charts ==
=== Weekly charts ===
Chart (2008–2009)	Peak position
Australia (ARIA)	1
Austria (Ö3 Austria Top 40)	64
Belgium (Ultratip Bubbling Under Flanders)	12
Belgium (Ultratip Bubbling Under Wallonia)	20
Canada Hot 100 (Billboard)	12
Canada CHR/Top 40 (Billboard)	20
Canada Hot AC (Billboard)	2
European Hot 100 Singles (Billboard)	64
France (SNEP)	5
Germany (GfK)	73
Greece (IFPI)	3
Ireland (IRMA)	4
New Zealand (Recorded Music NZ)	18
Scotland Singles (OCC)	19
Slovakia Airplay (ČNS IFPI)	24
Switzerland (Schweizer Hitparade)	63
UK Singles (OCC)	35
US Billboard Hot 100	7
US Adult Alternative Airplay (Billboard)	1
US Adult Contemporary (Billboard)	2
US Adult Pop Airplay (Billboard)	1
US Alternative Airplay (Billboard)	38
US Hot Christian Songs (Billboard)	16
US Pop Airplay (Billboard)	6

=== Year-end charts ===
Chart (2009)	Position
Australia (ARIA)	13
Canada (Canadian Hot 100)	34
US Billboard Hot 100	13
US Adult Contemporary (Billboard)	7
US Adult Top 40 (Billboard)	1
US Mainstream Top 40 (Billboard)	10

=== Decade-end charts ===
Chart (2000–2009)	Position
Australia (ARIA)	61

== Certifications ==
Certifications for "You Found Me"
Region	Certification	Certified units/sales
Australia (ARIA)	2× Platinum	140,000^{^}
Denmark (IFPI Danmark)	Gold	45,000^{‡}
Germany (BVMI)	Gold	150,000^{‡}
Italy (FIMI)	Gold	25,000^{‡}
New Zealand (RMNZ)	2× Platinum	60,000^{‡}
United Kingdom (BPI)	Platinum	600,000^{‡}
United States (RIAA)	7× Platinum	7,000,000^{‡}
^{^} Shipments figures based on certification alone.^{‡} Sales+streaming figures based on certification alone.

== Release history ==
Release dates and formats for "You Found Me"
Region	Date	Format	Label(s)	Ref.
United States	December 16, 2008	Mainstream airplay	Epic	

== See also ==
- I–V–vi–IV progression
