= Reason (The Fray EP) =

Reason EP

EP by The Fray
- Released: 2003
- Genre: Alternative rock
- Length: 22:41
- Label: Independent
- Producer: Aaron Johnson

The Fray chronology
Movement EP (2002)	Reason EP (2003)	How to Save a Life (2005)

Reason EP is the second EP from Denver-based rock band the Fray, released in 2003 by an independent record label. In October 2007, the EP was re-released by Epic Records.

== Track listing ==
All songs written by Isaac Slade and Joe King, except "Vienna", co-written with Dan Battenhouse.

1. "Together" – 2:23
2. "Some Trust" – 2:54
3. "Vienna" – 3:49
4. "Without Reason" – 3:33
5. "City Hall" – 3:00
6. "Oceans Away" – 3:58
7. "Unsaid" – 3:04

== Notes ==
The drums on "Oceans Away" and "Vienna" are done by Zach Johnson, the first drummer for The Fray. For "Together", the guitar is played by Mike Ayars. The tracks "Vienna" and "Oceans Away" were featured in the band's first EP, Movement. "Vienna" was again featured on the band's debut album How to Save a Life.

== Personnel ==
- Isaac Slade - lead vocals, piano
- Dave Welsh - lead guitar on all tracks except "Together"
- Joe King - rhythm guitar, backing vocals
- Dan Battenhouse - bass guitar
- Ben Wysocki - drums, percussion on all tracks except "Oceans Away" and "Vienna"

Additional musicians

- Mike Ayars - lead guitar on "Together"
- Zach Johnson - drums on "Oceans Away" and "Vienna"

Production

- Aaron Johnson - production, mixing, mastering, engineering

== Reception ==
Reason EP launched the band into prominence in its native Denver city. The songs from the EP began receiving airplay on Denver radio stations, especially on KTCL. The band were invited as a headliner at a local theatre and later, it was voted Best New Band by Westword (a local alternative newsweekly). The band also won in the rock category of the "Westword Music Showcase Awards." Epic Records A&R man, Mike Flynn grew interested in the band after hearing the third track on the EP, "Vienna". He stated that the song "was real music. It was timeless music. Epic later signed the band in 2004.

Following its re-issue in 2007 (by which time the band had achieved mainstream success with the release of its debut album, How to Save a Life), Allmusic, in its review of the EP, compared it unfavorably to the radio-friendly style of the debut album, but stated that "the music is pleasant enough, with moodswinging melodies and tasteful piano fashioning some fine, middle-of-the-road pop/rock tunes." Westword gave the EP a positive review, stating "the music is epic, no doubt, but it's played on a wholly human scale" and compared The Fray favorably to Coldplay. CNET later termed Reason EP as "a career changing EP".
