= Movement (EP) =

Movement EP

EP by The Fray
- Released: Summer 2002
- Genre: Alternative rock
- Length: 14:53
- Producer: The Fray

The Fray chronology
Movement EP (2002)	Reason EP (2003)

Movement EP is the first EP from Denver-based rock band the Fray, released in 2002. The songs "Where You Want To" and "It's For You" feature Joe King on lead vocals, rather than the band's lead vocalist Isaac Slade. The album was recorded after Dave Welsh's earlier departure, and before Ben Wysocki joined the band. Mike Ayars and Zach Johnson are featured on guitar and drums respectively, and Dan Battenhouse on bass. The tracks "Oceans Away" and "Vienna" are also featured on the band's second EP, Reason. "Vienna" was again featured on the band's debut album, How to Save a Life.

== Track listing ==
All songs were written by Slade and King, apart from "Vienna", which was co-written with Dan Battenhouse.

1. "Where You Want To" – 3:22
2. "Oceans Away" – 3:59
3. "It's For You" – 3:46
4. "Vienna" – 3:46

== Personnel ==
- Isaac Slade - lead vocals, piano
- Mike Ayars - lead guitar
- Joe King - rhythm guitar, backing vocals, lead vocals on "Where You Want To" and "It's For You"
- Dan Battenhouse - bass guitar
- Zach Johnson - drums
