= Heartbeat (The Fray song) =

2011 single by the Fray

Single by The Fray

from the album Scars & Stories
- Released: October 11, 2011 (U.S.)
- Recorded: 2011 (Nashville, Tennessee)
- Genre: Rock; pop rock; alternative rock
- Length: 3:38
- Label: Epic
- Songwriters: Isaac Slade; Joe King
- Producer: Brendan O'Brien

The Fray singles chronology
"Syndicate" (2010)	"Heartbeat" (2011)	"Run for Your Life" (2012)

"Heartbeat" is the first single from the Fray's third album Scars & Stories. The band premiered the song while opening for U2 on their U2 360° Tour in May 2011. The song was released for airplay on October 8, 2011, and was released for download in the United States on iTunes on October 11, 2011.

== Meaning ==
Isaac Slade mentioned that song was inspired by his experiences traveling abroad; it is essentially about "a woman escaping a horrible situation in the middle of the night and coming back to life."

"That song came out of a period of my life when I was trying hard to be open to whatever came my way. I traveled through South Africa and Rwanda with a buddy, and at first it was really hard to stay open in the face of so much pain and heartache. But then I ended up meeting so many cool and inspiring people, and all these ideas for lyrics and melodies just started rushing in.”

The chorus of the song reflects a particular moment when a woman was sharing a deeply moving story about the genocides in Rwanda, and held Isaac's hand.

Oh, I'm feeling your heartbeat
And oh, you're comin' around, comin' around, comin' around
If you can love somebody, love them all the same.
You gotta love somebody, love them all the same.
I'm singing, oh, I feel your heartbeat.

On the Fray's official website, Slade explained:

The inspiration specifically came from a chance meeting with an expatriate woman. Speaking of the miracle of the capital city overcoming such remarkable odds, the two held hands and Slade reveals I felt so connected to her. I couldn’t tell if it was her pulse or mine.

== Music video ==
Joe King first announced that the principal photography for the video was taking place on October 14, 2011 via Twitter, and has since then concluded. The "beach themed" music video was shot on Sycamore Cove State Beach in Ventura County, California and was directed by Justin Francis. The video was made available on iTunes on November 15, 2011 and was released via Vevo on November 17. The song is also played in the trailer for "Salmon Fishing in the Yemen".

== Chart performance ==
The song debuted at number 43 on the Billboard Hot 100, with digital sales of 50,000 for its opening week and has climbed to number 10 on the US Adult Pop Songs since its debut. As of June 21, 2012, the single has sold 500,000 copies worldwide.

=== Weekly charts ===
Chart (2011–2012)	Peak position
Australia (ARIA)	66
Canada Hot 100 (Billboard)	63
Japan Hot 100 (Billboard)	89
US Billboard Hot 100	42
US Adult Alternative Airplay (Billboard)	10
US Adult Contemporary (Billboard)	22
US Adult Pop Airplay (Billboard)	10
US Hot Christian Songs (Billboard)	40
US Hot Rock & Alternative Songs (Billboard)	37
US Pop Airplay (Billboard)	22

=== Year-end charts ===
Chart (2012)	Position
US Adult Alternative Songs (Billboard)	42
US Adult Top 40 (Billboard)	41

== Release history ==
Release dates and formats for "Heartbeat"
Region	Date	Format	Label(s)	Ref.
United States	October 25, 2011	Mainstream airplay	Epic	
