= Love Don't Die =

Single by the Fray

from the album Helios
- Released: October 15, 2013
- Recorded: 2013
- Genre: Alternative rock; pop rock; dance-rock
- Length: 3:03
- Label: Epic
- Songwriter(s): Isaac Slade; Ryan Tedder; Joe King
- Producer(s): Ryan Tedder; Stuart Price

The Fray singles chronology
"Run for Your Life" (2012)	"Love Don't Die" (2013)	"Hurricane" (2014)

"Love Don't Die" is a song by American rock band the Fray, released by Epic Records on December 12, 2013, as the lead single from their fourth album, Helios (2014). It was written by vocalist Isaac Slade and guitarist Joe King alongside OneRepublic frontman Ryan Tedder, who served as the song's producer alongside Stuart Price. The song premiered in October 2013, during one of the band's live performances. It peaked at number 60 on the Billboard Hot 100, and remains the band's final song to enter the chart.

"Love Don't Die" was released to airplay on October 15, 2013, and was released for download in the United States on iTunes on October 21, 2013. The song was used in several commercials, including for the Samsung Gear Fit and commercial for CSI:Las Vegas S15 (only available in AXN Asia).

== Music video ==
The music video for the single was released on December 6, 2013. It features the guest star Candice King from The Vampire Diaries, Joe King's then-wife, and holds its setting at a bar. In the video, a stranger begins to harass Candice, so guitarist Joe King initiates a fight. The fight progresses and comes to include the entire band, and ends when the band escapes the bar on motorcycles. The video is heavily inspired by a scene from The Blues Brothers in which similar proceedings in bar take place.

== Live performances ==
"Love Don't Die" was performed on October 22, 2013, on NBC's Today Show.

== Chart performance ==
=== Weekly charts ===
Chart (2013–2014)	Peak position
Australia (ARIA)	44
Canada (Canadian Hot 100)	70
Canada Hot AC (Billboard)	31
US Billboard Hot 100	60
US Adult Contemporary (Billboard)	20
US Adult Pop Airplay (Billboard)	7
US Hot Rock & Alternative Songs (Billboard)	11
US Rock Airplay (Billboard)	41

=== Year-end charts ===
Chart (2014)	Position
US Adult Top 40 (Billboard)	35
US Hot Rock Songs (Billboard)	25

== Certifications ==
Region	Certification	Certified units/sales
United States (RIAA)	Gold	500,000^{‡}
^{‡} Sales+streaming figures based on certification alone.
