= How to Save a Life (album) =

Studio album by The Fray
- Released: September 13, 2005
- Recorded: 2005
- Studio: Echo Park Studios (Bloomington, Indiana); Sony Music Studios (New York City, New York); Coupe Studios (Boulder, Colorado); FTM Studios (Lakewood, Colorado)
- Genre: Alternative rock; pop rock
- Length: 45:56
- Label: Epic
- Producer: Aaron Johnson; Mike Flynn

The Fray chronology
Reason EP (2003)	How to Save a Life (2005)	Live at the Electric Factory: Bootleg No. 1 (2006)

Singles from How to Save a Life
- 1. "Over My Head (Cable Car)" Released: October 7, 2005; 2. "How to Save a Life" Released: March 26, 2006; 3. "Look After You" Released: February 6, 2007; 4. "All at Once" Released: June 2007

How to Save a Life is the debut studio album by American alternative rock band The Fray. It was released on September 13, 2005, by Epic Records.

Prior to its release, The Fray had independently released two extended plays and signed with Epic in December 2004 after the single "Over My Head (Cable Car)" became a sleeper hit on Denver radio stations. Recording sessions for How to Save a Life mostly took place over six weeks in Echo Park Studios in Bloomington, Indiana, with other sessions taking place in New York City and Colorado. The album was produced by Aaron Johnson and Mike Flynn and incorporates dramatic melodies and piano-driven ballads, while its lyrics exhibit themes of loss, regret, personal crisis, and heartache.

Four singles were released for the album, including "Over My Head (Cable Car)", "How to Save a Life", "Look After You" and "All at Once". "How to Save a Life" reached number 3 on the US Billboard Hot 100 and "Over My Head (Cable Car)" reached number 8, while the album peaked in the top 15 on the US Billboard 200 and was a top ten hit in Australia, Canada, Ireland, New Zealand and the United Kingdom.

How to Save a Life received mixed reviews from music critics, who praised the band's production style but criticized its content as derivative. "How to Save a Life" was nominated for Best Rock Performance by a Duo or Group with Vocal and "Over My Head (Cable Car)" was nominated for Best Pop Performance by a Duo or Group with Vocals at the 49th Annual Grammy Awards.

== Background ==
After independently releasing two EPs, The Fray were looking for a record company to release a full-length album. The band released their song "Cable Car" to Denver radio station KTCL, and the song saw significant airplay. Denver alternative newsweekly Westword named the band "Best New Band" in 2004, and this prompted Epic Records A&R man Mike Flynn to sign the band to a recording contract on December 17, 2004. The album was recorded over six weeks in Echo Park Studios in Bloomington, Indiana, and was produced by Aaron Johnson and Mike Flynn. Former bass guitar player Dan Battenhouse left the band a year before entering the studio; Jake Smith, former lead singer and guitarist of the band The Mysteries of Life, took over bass guitar duties.

== Critical reception ==
Professional ratings
Review scores
Source	Rating
AllMusic	3/5 stars
Blender	3/5 stars
Entertainment.ie	1/5 stars
Entertainment Weekly	C+
HM Magazine	4/5 stars
Rolling Stone	3/5 stars
Stylus Magazine	D

Overall, critical reception for the album was mixed. The piano-oriented sound of the album drew comparisons with British piano-rock band Keane, and Coldplay (whose music – although classified as alternative – is driven by the piano).

AllMusic, whilst giving the album a modestly positive review, stated that the band "lacked originality" and the album itself lacked any "inspiration and excitement". Stylus Magazine gave the album a negative review, stating "The Fray, as a rule, are moribund, emotionally strained, uninvolving, and have a tendency to sound like The Cranberries fronted by a man." Rolling Stone and Blender echoed many of these statements, both giving the album three stars out of five.

== Track listing ==
=== Original release ===
All tracks are written by Isaac Slade and Joe King, except where noted.

No.	Title	Writer(s)	Length
1.	"She Is"		3:56
2.	"Over My Head (Cable Car)"		3:58
3.	"How to Save a Life"		4:23
4.	"All at Once"	Slade; King; Aaron Johnson	3:48
5.	"Fall Away"	Slade; King; Dan Battenhouse	4:23
6.	"Heaven Forbid"		3:59
7.	"Look After You"		4:28
8.	"Hundred"	Slade; Monica Conway	4:13
9.	"Vienna"	Slade; King; Battenhouse	3:51
10.	"Dead Wrong"	Slade; King; Mike Flynn	3:05
11.	"Little House"		2:30
12.	"Trust Me"		3:22
Total length:			45:56

=== Bonus track ===
In later editions, an extra track was added:

13. "Unsaid" – 3:05

=== Bonus CD ===
14. "Over My Head (Cable Car)" (Live at the Gothic (May 20, 2005))
15. "How to Save a Life" (Live for MTV.com & VH1.com (July 14, 2005))
16. "Look After You" (Live at Red Rocks (08.12.2005))
17. "Heaven Forbid" (Live at Red Rocks (08.12.2005))

=== Bonus DVD ===
1. How to Save a Life (The Story)
2. On The Road 2006 (Documentary)
3. "Over My Head (Cable Car)" (Music Video)
4. "Over My Head (Cable Car)" (Making the video)

== Personnel ==
The Fray

- Isaac Slade – lead vocals, acoustic piano
- Dave Welsh – lead guitars
- Joe King – rhythm guitars, backing vocals, lead vocals on "Heaven Forbid"
- Ben Wysocki – drums, percussion

Additional musicians

- Jake Smith – bass
- Dan Battenhouse – bass on "How to Save a Life"
- Suzie Katayama – string arrangements and conductor on "Look After You"

== Production ==
- Mike Flynn – producer, A&R
- Aaron Johnson – producer, additional engineer
- Paul Mahern – recording, Pro Tools editing
- Kevin Loyal – recording assistant
- James Masterson – recording assistant
- Tim Hoagland – additional engineer
- Warren Huart – additional Pro Tools editing, drum recording (3)
- Clark Germain – string recording (7)
- Mark Endert – mixing at Scream Studios (Studio City, California)
- Alex Uychocde – mix assistant
- Stephen Marcussen – mastering at Marcussen Mastering (Hollywood, California)
- Michelle Holme – art direction
- Nathan Johnson – front and back cover artwork
- Zach Johnson – hand lettering
- The Crackerfarm – packaging
- Jason Ienner – management
- Gregg Latterman – management

== Release ==
The album was released on September 13, 2005 by Epic Records. While the album did not make a splash commercially or critically initially, the success of "Over My Head (Cable Car)" propelled the album from the Top Heatseekers chart to the top 20 of The Billboard 200 chart. The release of the second single, "How to Save a Life", a world-wide smash, helped the album enter the top 5 in several charts across the world, and brought The Fray mainstream popularity. The song remains the band's best known and most successful song to date.

The album received double platinum certification by the Recording Industry Association of America (RIAA), and was also certified platinum in Australia, Canada, New Zealand and the UK; it became the best-selling digital album of all time until Eminem's Recovery (2010), breaking the record held previously by Coldplay's X&Y (2005). Billboard listed the album on their Best Digital Albums of the Decade list – at number 21.

== Awards and nominations ==
- The album won all three awards in the digital category at the 2005 Billboard Music Awards: Digital Album of the Year, Digital Album Artist of the Year and Digital Songs Artist of the Year while the band was nominated for New Artist of the Year.
- The first two singles, "Over My Head (Cable Car)" and "How to Save a Life" were nominated for a Grammy Award for Best Pop Performance by a Duo or Group with Vocal and Grammy Award for Best Rock Performance by a Duo or Group with Vocal respectively in 2007.
- The band was also nominated for a Choice Music: Breakout Group award at the 2007 Teen Choice Awards.

== Charts ==
=== Weekly charts ===
2006–2007 weekly chart performance for How to Save a Life
Chart (2006–2007)	Peak position
Australian Albums (ARIA)	1
Belgian Albums (Ultratop Flanders)	47
Canadian Albums (Billboard)	9
Dutch Albums (Album Top 100)	50
French Albums (SNEP)	52
German Albums (Offizielle Top 100)	56
Irish Albums (IRMA)	4
Italian Albums (FIMI)	85
New Zealand Albums (RMNZ)	2
Scottish Albums (Official Charts)	4
Spanish Albums (Promusicae)	71
Swiss Albums (Schweizer Hitparade)	57
UK Albums (Official Charts)	4
US Billboard 200	14
US Top Rock Albums (Billboard)	4

2025 weekly chart performance for How to Save a Life
Chart (2025)	Peak position
Norwegian Rock Albums (IFPI Norge)	20

=== Year-end charts ===
2006 year-end chart performance for How to Save a Life
Chart (2006)	Position
US Billboard 200	39
US Top Rock Albums (Billboard)	6

2007 year-end chart performance for How to Save a Life
Chart (2007)	Position
Australian Albums (ARIA)	37
New Zealand Albums (RMNZ)	34
UK Albums (OCC)	33
US Billboard 200	43
US Top Rock Albums (Billboard)	8

== Certifications ==
Certifications for How to Save a Life
Region	Certification	Certified units/sales
Australia (ARIA)	Platinum	70,000^{^}
Canada (Music Canada)	Platinum	100,000^{^}
Denmark (IFPI Danmark)	Platinum	20,000^{‡}
Germany (BVMI)	Gold	100,000^{‡}
Ireland (IRMA)	Platinum	15,000^{^}
New Zealand (RMNZ)	2× Platinum	30,000^{‡}
United Kingdom (BPI)	Platinum	300,000^{^}
United States (RIAA)	5× Platinum	5,000,000^{‡}
^{^} Shipments figures based on certification alone.^{‡} Sales+streaming figures based on certification alone.
