= Look After You =

Single by the Fray

from the album How to Save a Life
- Released: February 6, 2007
- Recorded: 2005 Bloomington, Indiana
- Genre: Soft rock
- Length: 4:28 (Album Version); 4:02 (Radio Edit)
- Label: Epic
- Songwriters: Isaac Slade and Joe King
- Producers: Mike Flynn and Aaron Johnson

The Fray singles chronology
"How to Save a Life" (2006)	"Look After You" (2007)	"All at Once" (2007)

"Look After You" is a song by American rock band the Fray. It was released in February 2007 as the third single from their debut album, How to Save a Life, following the widespread success of their previous single "How to Save a Life". According to lead singer and pianist Isaac Slade, the song was written about his then-girlfriend and future wife, Anna, when she was living in Australia. The song has appeared on the TV show Intervention for its third season and has been featured in episodes of Cold Case, Ghost Whisperer, The Hills, One Tree Hill, Journeyman, Moonlight, Rescue Me, Bones and the unaired pilot of Women's Murder Club. It was also featured in the 2008 film Jumper.

== Chart performance ==
The song peaked at #59 on the Billboard Hot 100, becoming the band's first single to miss the Top 40. The song also missed the Top 40 on the Billboard's Pop 100, although it performed marginally better on the chart than on the Billboard Hot 100, peaking at #49.

== Live ==
When the band performs the song live, they sometimes insert a small interlude after the chorus where Slade sings the refrains from either "Wonderwall" by Oasis, "You Are So Beautiful" by Joe Cocker or "You're Beautiful" by James Blunt.

== Music video ==
A music video for the song reported in progress in February 2007, with Chris Mills as the director. However, the video was never released.

== Charts ==
=== Weekly charts ===
Chart (2007)	Peak position
US Billboard Hot 100	59
US Adult Pop Airplay (Billboard)	12
US Pop Airplay (Billboard)	31
US Pop 100 (Billboard)	49

=== Year-end charts ===
Chart (2007)	Position
US Adult Top 40 (Billboard)	36

== Certifications ==
Region	Certification	Certified units/sales
New Zealand (RMNZ)	Platinum	30,000^{‡}
United Kingdom (BPI)	Platinum	600,000^{‡}
^{‡} Sales+streaming figures based on certification alone.

== Release history ==
Release dates and formats for "Look After You"
Region	Date	Format	Label(s)	Ref.
United States	February 6, 2007	Mainstream airplay	Epic	
