= Over My Head (Cable Car) =

2005 single by The Fray

Single by the Fray

from the album How to Save a Life and Stealth: Music from the Motion Picture
- Released: October 7, 2005
- Recorded: June 24, 2005
- Studio: Echo Park Studios; Bloomington, Indiana
- Genre: Pop rock
- Length: 3:58
- Label: Epic
- Songwriters: Isaac Slade; Joe King
- Producers: Mike Flynn; Aaron Johnson

The Fray singles chronology
"Over My Head (Cable Car)" (2005)	"How to Save a Life" (2006)

Audio sample
- file; help

"Over My Head (Cable Car)" (originally performed simply as "Cable Car") is a song by American rock band the Fray. It was released in October 2005 as the lead single from their debut album How to Save a Life and from the soundtrack to the science fiction action film Stealth (2005). It hit the top 10 on the Billboard Hot 100 chart. The single helped propel their album from the Top Heatseekers chart to the top 20 of the Billboard 200 chart. The CD single was backed with "Heaven Forbid" and a live version of "Hundred". In the United Kingdom, "Over My Head (Cable Car)" was released as the second single from the album, following "How to Save a Life".

The song sold over two million digital downloads in the United States and was certified 2× Platinum by the RIAA in May 2006. The song was the fifth most-downloaded single of 2006 and was ranked number 13 on the Hot 100 singles of 2006 by Billboard. It was nominated for a Grammy Award for Best Pop Performance by a Duo or Group with Vocals in 2006 but lost to "My Humps" by the Black Eyed Peas.

The song was ranked number 43 on Billboard's Best Adult Pop Songs of the Decade list and number 100 on Billboard's Top 100 Digital Tracks of the Decade list.

After comparisons were drawn between "Over My Head (Cable Car)" and the Chainsmokers' "Closer" featuring Halsey, Isaac Slade and guitarist Joe King of the Fray were credited as co-writers of "Closer" on September 2, 2016.

== Song meaning ==
The song "Over My Head" was written about lead singer and pianist Isaac Slade's relationship with his brother, Caleb, nicknamed "Cable Car". He wrote the song because he and his brother were allegedly not speaking and were at odds with each other:

"It is about a fight I got in with my brother, Caleb. After he graduated high school, we drifted apart and really hadn't spoken in a long time. One day we both realized that we needed to fight it out. We'd been friends for 20 years. That's a long time when you're only 23 years old. We fought it out, and he's one of my best friends today."

The song was originally recorded as a demo in 2004. This demo version was picked up by Denver radio station KTCL, and became one of the station's most played songs of 2005. The song gained an even bigger boost after it was used in the 2005 film Stealth; it also appeared on the film’s official soundtrack by their label Epic. There is also another slightly different version of the song which is 4:10 in length.

== Reception ==
=== Critical ===
Billboard called the tune "a timeless pop-rock smash that soars with lightness and ease." Stylus Magazine called it a "10/10, single of the year, instant classic track".

=== Commercial ===
The song became a top 40 hit on the Modern Rock Tracks chart in late 2005. It lasted three weeks on the chart and peaked at position No. 37. The single gained airplay nationally, entering the Billboard Hot 100 chart on the issue marked February 25, 2006. 14 weeks later it reached its peak position at No. 8 on the Hot 100 chart. On the Billboard Adult Top 40 chart, the single reached the No. 2 position. The single also saw airplay on some Christian radio stations and spent several weeks on the R&R Christian charts, where it peaked at No. 27. Throughout 2006, it sold 1,570,207 digital copies.

Internationally, the song was a Top 25 hit in Australia, Canada, Denmark, Ireland, New Zealand and the United Kingdom. In the beginning of 2007, the song became popular in the Netherlands.

== Music video ==
Micah Slade in the music video

The music video was directed by Elliott Lester and was filmed on July 24, 2005, at East High School and at Fox Theatre in Denver and Boulder, respectively. The video shows the members of the band as children, who attract the attention of other children by playing various instruments. Micah Slade, the youngest brother of Isaac Slade, assumes the role of Isaac as a child in the music video. The video premiered on September 21, 2005, and peaked at No. 2 in the VH1 Top 20 Countdown.

== Charts ==
=== Weekly charts ===
Chart (2005–2007)	Peak position
Australia (ARIA)	22
Belgium (Ultratip Bubbling Under Flanders)	4
Canada AC (Billboard)	40
Canada CHR/Top 40 (Billboard)	19
Canada Hot AC (Billboard)	12
Denmark (Tracklisten)	8
Germany (GfK)	83
Ireland (IRMA)	25
Netherlands (Single Top 100)	67
New Zealand (Recorded Music NZ)	25
Scotland Singles (Official Charts)	33
Switzerland (Schweizer Hitparade)	96
UK Singles (Official Charts)	19
US Billboard Hot 100	8
US Adult Contemporary (Billboard)	15
US Adult Pop Airplay (Billboard)	2
US Alternative Airplay (Billboard)	37
US Pop Airplay (Billboard)	5

=== Year-end charts ===
Chart (2006)	Position
Australia (ARIA)	79
US Billboard Hot 100	13
US Adult Contemporary (Billboard)	28
US Adult Top 40 (Billboard)	1

Chart (2007)	Position
Brazil (Crowley)	43
UK Singles (OCC)	137

== Certifications ==
Region	Certification	Certified units/sales
Australia (ARIA)	Gold	35,000^{^}
Canada (Music Canada)	Gold	20,000^{*}
New Zealand (RMNZ)	Platinum	30,000^{‡}
United Kingdom (BPI)	Gold	400,000^{‡}
United States (RIAA)	5× Platinum	5,000,000^{‡}
United States (RIAA) Mastertone	Gold	500,000^{*}
^{*} Sales figures based on certification alone.^{^} Shipments figures based on certification alone.^{‡} Sales+streaming figures based on certification alone.

== Release history ==
Release dates and formats for "Over My Head (Cable Car)"
Region	Date	Format	Label(s)	Ref.
United States	March 7, 2006	Mainstream airplay	Epic	

== A Day to Remember version ==
"Over My Head (Cable Car)"

Song by A Day to Remember

from the album Attack of the Killer B-Sides
- Released: May 25, 2010
- Studio: The Wade Studio, Ocala, Florida
- Genre: Metalcore; pop punk; post-hardcore
- Length: 3:31
- Label: Victory
- Songwriters: Isaac Slade; Joe King
- Producer: Andrew Wade

"Over My Head (Cable Car)" was covered by American rock band A Day to Remember and included on their EP, Attack of the Killer B-Sides. It was also previously released on the Punk Goes Pop Volume Two compilation album.

== See also ==
- "Closer" (The Chainsmokers song)
