= How to Save a Life =

2006 single by the Fray

Single by the Fray

from the album How to Save a Life
- Released: September 5, 2005 (original); March 26, 2006 (as a single)
- Recorded: 2004–2005
- Genre: Pop rock; soft rock
- Length: 4:22 (album version); 4:00 (single mix)
- Label: Epic
- Songwriters: Isaac Slade; Joe King
- Producers: Mike Flynn; Aaron Johnson

The Fray singles chronology
| "Over My Head (Cable Car)" (2005) | "How to Save a Life" (2005) | "Look After You" (2007) |

Audio sample
- file; help

"How to Save a Life" is a song by American alternative rock band the Fray, released in March 26, 2006 as the second single from their debut studio album of the same name. The song is one of the band's most popular airplay songs and peaked at number three on the Billboard Hot 100 chart in the United States, becoming the band's highest-charting song. It became the joint seventh longest-charting single on the Billboard Hot 100, tying with Santana's 1999 single "Smooth", at 58 consecutive weeks. The song has received quintuple platinum certification by the Recording Industry Association of America (RIAA), and has sold 4.7 million downloads as of January 2015, the fourth best-selling rock song in digital history.

"How to Save a Life" is the band's biggest hit single, peaking the Adult Top 40 chart for 15 consecutive weeks and peaking the Canadian Airplay Chart. It was also nominated for a Grammy Award for Best Rock Performance by a Duo or Group with Vocal in 2007, but lost to "Dani California" by Red Hot Chili Peppers. Lyrically, the song is the lamentation of a person unable to help a troubled friend.

== Background and writing ==
Slade claims that the song is about all of the people that tried to reach out to the boy but were unsuccessful. As Slade says in an interview, the boy's friends and family approached him by saying, "Quit taking drugs and cutting yourself or I won't talk to you again," but all he needed was some support. The boy was losing friends and going through depression. He lost his best friend and could not deal with it. The verses of the song describe an attempt by an adult to confront a troubled teen. In the chorus, the singer laments that he himself was unable to save a friend because he did not know how.

While this was the original intent of the song, the band has opened the song to interpretation. They created a website where fans were welcome to submit music videos they had made for the song. This arose from the response that Slade got from the song:

I got a lot of e-mails about it (...) One boy died in a car accident, and I guess it had been the last song he downloaded from his computer. They played it at his funeral, and some of his friends got Save a life tattooed on their arms. The response has been overwhelming.

During an interview in Sauce, Bob Wilson asked Slade, "'How to Save a Life' was apparently inspired by an experience you had as a mentor to a boy who had a drug problem. What's the story behind that?" Slade answered:

Well there's a group home here in Denver called Shelterwood, and it takes in teens who've had a tough time; their parents don't want to send them to jail, but they can't keep track of them themselves... A friend of mine was actually the president for that particular school, so he asked Joe and I to come up for one of their weekend retreats... I was paired up with one boy in particular. His story was just amazing – all the relationships that he had put at risk because of the decisions he made, and eventually losing the relationships... the cost of his lifestyle and his choices, and kind of relating them to my own life and my own stories; seeing all the relationships I've threatened for one reason or another. It was a really inspiring weekend.

== Commercial performance ==
Throughout 2006, "How to Save a Life" sold 1,559,704 digital copies in the United States. The song is the band's first to achieve significant popularity outside of the United States. "How to Save a Life" was a top five hit in Australia, Canada, Ireland, Italy, Spain, Sweden and the United Kingdom. Due to an early leak by BBC Radio 1 in the United Kingdom, where it was the band's debut single, the song was released in the territory five weeks earlier than planned. It debuted at number 29 on the UK Singles Chart on January 21, 2007, via downloads alone. Instead of its planned release date which was to be March 26, 2007, the single was physically released in the United Kingdom on February 28 and gradually rose up the chart, reaching number five on February 25, staying there for four weeks. It eventually peaked at number four on the UK Singles Chart on April 8 and became Britain's eleventh biggest-selling song of 2007. On March 29, "How to Save a Life" peaked at number 1 in Ireland, becoming their first and only number one single in the country to date. The song only stayed at the top spot for a week but sales still proved strong after it fell from number 1.

The song was ranked No. 24 on Billboard's Best Adult Pop Songs of the Decade, and No. 47 on Billboard's Top 100 Digital Tracks of the Decade. It was also ranked No. 58 on Billboard's Hot 100 Songs of the Decade and No. 56 on Rhapsody's list of the Top 100 Tracks of the Decade. The song was the 25th most downloaded song of all time on iTunes as of February 2010. The song has sold over 4.7 million copies in the United States as of January 2015.

== In popular culture ==
The song was first featured on ABC's Grey's Anatomy, after Alexandra Patsavas, the music supervisor for the show, saw the band perform in Los Angeles. Alexandra then incorporated the song into the second-season episode "Superstition". After its usage in the episode, the song became a minor Hot 100 hit. The song became an "unofficial theme" for the other members of the Grey's Anatomy production after the episode aired, leading to the decision that the song would be used in the main promotion for the third season in the show. Grey's Anatomy is credited with bringing popularity to the song. It was also used in the show's musical episode when Callie was having surgery to save her and baby Sofia's life. The song also featured prominently in the season five Scrubs episode "My Lunch", and was used as the song of choice for the 'best bits' of season 8 of Big Brother UK.

"How to Save a Life" was also featured in One Tree Hill.

On September 26, 2015, the Fray performed this song during the closing day of Pope Francis' visit to Philadelphia. In 2023, the song was covered by country music singer-songwriter Wyatt Flores and was later included on his 2024 extended play Half Life.

== Music videos ==
The original music video, which premiered on VH1 on September 12, 2006, featured the recurring themes of light and stopped time. This music video shows the scene of a car crash and all of its presumed victims in pause. There is a recurring light throughout the video shining brightly in the dark woods that the video takes place in. Scenes of the band playing in a dark warehouse are intercut with the story going on outside. This version of the video was placed at No. 21 of the year by VH1's "Top 40 Videos of 2006".

Another version of the music video juxtaposes scenes from Grey's Anatomy to scenes of the original music video. However, all the scenes of the presumed car crash victims are excluded and only scenes of the Fray playing in a warehouse are shown.

A third music video, directed by Mark Pellington, was released for the song on December 6, 2006. The video features various adolescents, all who appear to be depressed and suicidal, or possibly mourning the loss of a loved one, as hinted by one of the individuals holding a portrait of an aged man, and by one of them screaming "Mom". All of these children have lost a significant loved one prior to the video, and many of them cry and scream in the video, all against a white background. Scenes of the band playing the song against this same white background are also shown throughout the video. Many numbered steps are shown alongside them, such as "Remember", "Cry", or "Let It Go". The video ends with each child finding a catharsis and making peace with themselves or others. This version of the video debuted on MTV's Total Request Live (TRL) at No. 9 and peaked at No. 1 on December 21, 2006, becoming the band's first TRL No. 1 and the last No. 1 video on TRL for 2006.

== Track listings ==
CD 1

1. "How to Save a Life" (single mix) – 4:00
2. "She Is" – Acoustic from Stripped Raw + Real

CD 2

1. "How to Save a Life" (album version) – 4:22
2. "How to Save a Life" – Acoustic from Stripped Raw + Real – 4:22
3. "She Is" – Acoustic from Stripped Raw + Real
4. "How to Save a Life" – CD-R

== Personnel ==
The Fray

- Isaac Slade – lead vocals, piano
- Dave Welsh – lead guitar
- Joe King – rhythm guitar, backing vocals
- Dan Battenhouse – bass guitar
- Dave Korea – stylophone, vibes
- Ben Wysocki – drums

Production Produced by Aaron Johnson and Mike Flynn

== Charts ==
=== Weekly charts ===
| Chart (2006–2007) | Peak position |
|---|---|
| Australia (ARIA) | 2 |
| Austria (Ö3 Austria Top 40) | 46 |
| Belgium (Ultratop 50 Flanders) | 7 |
| Belgium (Ultratip Bubbling Under Wallonia) | 2 |
| Canada Digital Song Sales (Billboard) | 1 |
| Canada Hot 100 (Billboard) | 17 (Note: "How to Save a Life" had already peaked in popularity when the first issue of the Canadian Hot 100 was released on March 31, 2007.) |
| Canada AC (Billboard) | 4 |
| Canada CHR/Top 40 (Billboard) | 4 |
| Canada Hot AC (Billboard) | 1 |
| Europe (Eurochart Hot 100) | 12 |
| France (SNEP) | 35 |
| Germany (GfK) | 45 |
| Ireland (IRMA) | 1 |
| Italy Digital Singles (FIMI) | 5 |
| Italy Physical Singles (FIMI) | 29 |
| Netherlands (Dutch Top 40) | 20 |
| Netherlands (Single Top 100) | 46 |
| New Zealand (Recorded Music NZ) | 7 |
| Norway (VG-lista) | 10 |
| Portugal (Billboard) | 7 |
| Scottish Singles Sales (Official Charts) | 6 |
| Slovakia Airplay (ČNS IFPI) | 83 |
| Sweden (Sverigetopplistan) | 5 |
| Switzerland (Schweizer Hitparade) | 28 |
| UK Singles (Official Charts) | 4 |
| UK Airplay (Music Week) | 10 |
| US Billboard Hot 100 | 3 |
| US Adult Alternative Airplay (Billboard) | 1 |
| US Adult Contemporary (Billboard) | 1 |
| US Adult Pop Airplay (Billboard) | 1 |
| US Alternative Airplay (Billboard) | 31 |
| US Hot Christian Songs (Billboard) | 4 |
| US Pop Airplay (Billboard) | 3 |

=== Year-end charts ===
| Chart (2006) | Position |
|---|---|
| US Billboard Hot 100 | 27 |
| US Adult Top 40 (Billboard) | 23 |

| Chart (2007) | Position |
|---|---|
| Australia (ARIA) | 18 |
| Belgium (Ultratop 50 Flanders) | 40 |
| Europe (Eurochart Hot 100) | 35 |
| Ireland (IRMA) | 10 |
| New Zealand (RIANZ) | 38 |
| Sweden (Sverigetopplistan) | 93 |
| Switzerland (Schweizer Hitparade) | 95 |
| UK Singles (OCC) | 11 |
| US Billboard Hot 100 | 24 |
| US Adult Contemporary (Billboard) | 2 |
| US Adult Top 40 (Billboard) | 5 |

=== Decade-end charts ===
| Chart (2000–09) | Position |
|---|---|
| US Billboard Hot 100 | 58 |

== Certifications ==
| Region | Certification | Certified units/sales |
|---|---|---|
| Australia (ARIA) | Platinum | 70,000^{^} |
| Canada (Music Canada) | Platinum | 40,000^{*} |
| Denmark (IFPI Danmark) | 2× Platinum | 180,000^{‡} |
| Germany (BVMI) | 2× Platinum | 600,000^{‡} |
| Italy (FIMI) | 2× Platinum | 100,000^{‡} |
| New Zealand (RMNZ) | 6× Platinum | 180,000^{‡} |
| Spain (Promusicae) | Platinum | 60,000^{‡} |
| United Kingdom (BPI) | 5× Platinum | 3,000,000^{‡} |
| United States (RIAA) | 11× Platinum | 11,000,000^{‡} |
| United States (RIAA) Mastertone | Platinum | 1,000,000^{*} |
Streaming
| Denmark (IFPI Danmark) | Gold | 900,000^{†} |
^{*} Sales figures based on certification alone.^{^} Shipments figures based on certification alone.^{‡} Sales+streaming figures based on certification alone.^{†} Streaming-only figures based on certification alone.

== Release history ==
Release dates and formats for "How to Save a Life"
| Region | Date | Format | Label(s) | Ref. |
|---|---|---|---|---|
| United States | August 28, 2006 | Contemporary hit radio | Epic | |
