= Joe King (musician) =

American guitarist (born 1980)

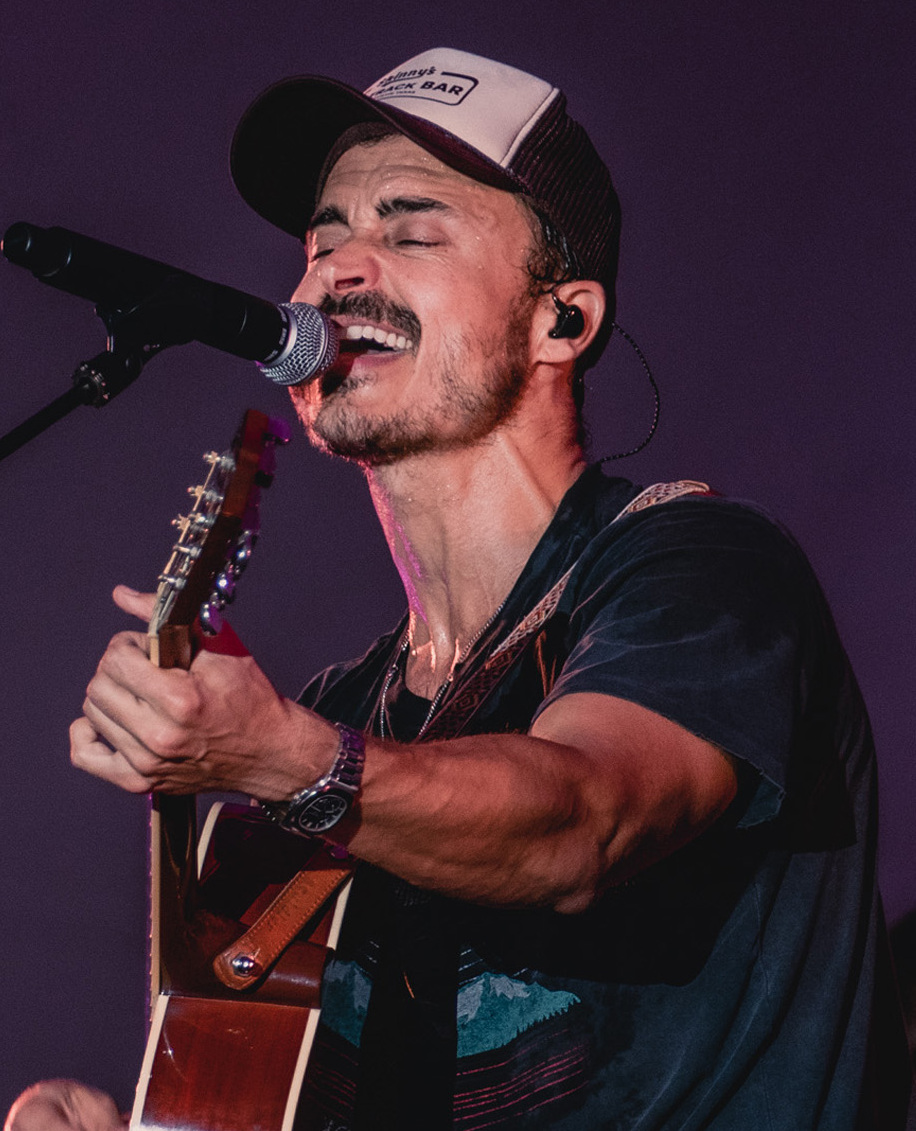
- King in 2023

Background information
- Born: Joseph Aaron King; May 25, 1980 (age 46); Cortez, Colorado, U.S.
- Genres: Pop rock; alternative rock
- Occupations: Singer; songwriter; guitarist
- Instruments: Guitar; vocals; bass
- Years active: 1999–present
- Labels: Epic; Sony
- Member of: The Fray
- Spouses: Julie King (m. 1999; div. 2011); Candice Accola (m. 2014; div. 2022)
- Children: 4

Joseph Aaron King (born May 25, 1980) is an American singer and songwriter from Cortez, Colorado. He is a vocalist, songwriter and guitarist for Denver-based rock band the Fray, which he formed with schoolmate and fellow musician Isaac Slade in 2002.

== Early life ==
Joe King was born on May 25, 1980, in Colorado. He attended Faith Christian Academy in Arvada, Colorado. Before his success with the Fray, King attended school while he worked as an auto damage appraiser.

He learned to play the piano at an early age, but later dropped it and started playing the guitar instead. He states that it was because "the coolest guys in my eighth grade class all played guitar. I wanted to fit in."

== Career ==
=== Mainstream success ===
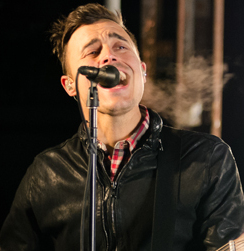
King performing in 2014

The Fray released Movement EP in 2002. King sang lead on two songs on the EP: "It's for You" and "Where You Want To".

The band released Reason EP in 2003, to some local acclaim in Denver. This prompted Epic Records to sign the band in 2004.

The band's first album, How to Save a Life, released in 2005, brought the band mainstream success. Apart from playing guitar, King sang lead on the song, "Heaven Forbid", which was about his sister. He also gave backing vocals on "How to Save a Life", "Look After You" and "Trust Me".

The band released their second album, The Fray, in 2009. The second single from the album, "Never Say Never", was written primarily by King from his perspective of his marriage. Apart from guitar, the second album also saw King singing a lot more: he supplied lead vocals on the song "Ungodly Hour" and on the bonus track "Uncertainty", and backing vocals on "Syndicate" and "Absolute".

The band released Scars & Stories in 2012, with King singing lead on "Rainy Zurich".

In 2022, Issac Slade left the Fray. Since then, King became the full-time lead vocalist after only performing lead vocals in at least one song per album.

=== Vocal characteristics and songwriting ===
While the Fray has been lyrically spearheaded by Slade, King co-writes almost all of the songs. In an interview, King stated that his lyrics were mainly inspired by his experiences with the band: "With success, you have a lot more drama. For me, it was extreme highs in career and extreme lows in a relationship. There were really obvious things to write about."

Commenting on the lyrics on the second album, King said: "A lot of really big realizations about ourselves are on this record. We're singing about real things that we've experienced. I'm not really comfortable talking about it, but I'm a lot more comfortable singing about it. It's a different side of me."

=== Work outside The Fray ===
King sang in the song "Undertow" off the Timbaland album Shock Value 2. He also co-wrote and co-produced the song "Alright With Me", which was included on American Idol winner Kris Allen's debut album, Kris Allen. Commenting on his working with Allen, King said that there was "a good vibe in the studio".

In April 2013, King released a six-song EP, Breaking, under the name "King." His single "Need a Woman by Friday" features Trombone Shorty.

In September 2017, King released five songs in a project titled "Union Moon".

== Personal life ==
King married for the first time when he was 19 years old. He and his first wife, Julie, had two daughters together.

King began dating actress Candice Accola after they met at a Super Bowl event in February 2012. They became engaged in May 2013, and married on October 18, 2014, in New Orleans, Louisiana. In August 2015, they announced that they were expecting their first child together. They had a daughter born in 2016. In August 2020, they announced that they were expecting their second child together. Candice gave birth to their second daughter in 2020. In May 2022, it was announced that Accola and King had split.
