= Isaac Slade =

American musician (born 1981)

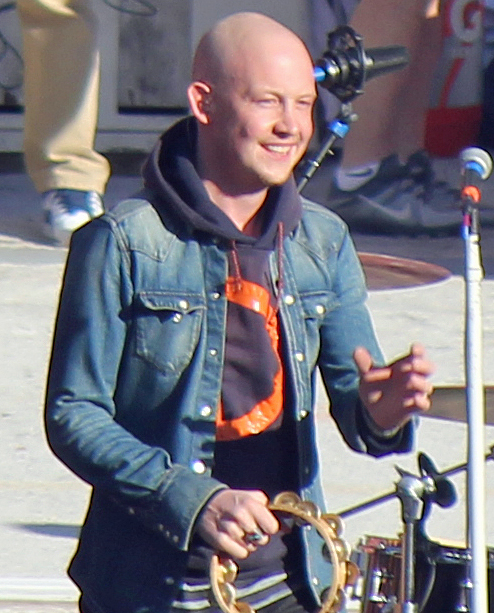
- Slade in 2014

Background information
- Born: Isaac Edward Slade; May 26, 1981 (age 45); Boulder, Colorado, U.S.
- Genres: Alternative rock; pop rock
- Occupations: Singer; musician; songwriter
- Instruments: Vocals; piano
- Years active: 1999–present
- Formerly of: Ember; The Fray

Isaac Edward Slade (born May 26, 1981) is an American singer-songwriter and musician, best known for his work with the rock band The Fray.

== Education ==
Slade attended the University of Colorado Denver, where he was enrolled as a music and entertainment industry studies major. He received a Bachelor of Music.

Slade started singing when he was eight years old, and began playing the piano at eleven, after temporarily losing his voice. He wrote his first song when he was sixteen and learned to play guitar when he was in high school.

== Career ==
=== Formation and early stages ===
Slade joined Ember, a band which consisted of Slade and his future band-mates Dave Welsh and Ben Wysocki. The band soon dissolved, and later, in the spring of 2002, Slade ran into former school-mate and vocalist/guitarist Joe King in a record store. The two began regular jam sessions, which led to writing songs. They later added Slade's younger brother, Caleb, on bass and Zach Johnson on drums.

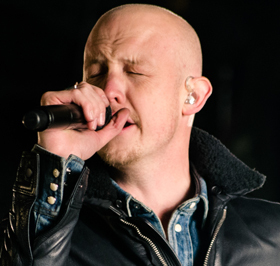
Slade performing in 2014

Dave Welsh and Ben Wysocki re-joined Slade and King, to form the Fray. They soon released Movement EP, and in 2003, they released Reason EP to some local critical acclaim, particularly by Denver's Westword alternative newsweekly. Despite these reviews, the band struggled to launch a single. Denver radio station KTCL rejected eight of their songs before the band decided to submit "Cable Car". The song found airplay on a KTCL radio show highlighting local bands and the radio station received a large number of requests for it soon thereafter. The band changed the name of the song to "Over My Head (Cable Car)", and by the end of 2005, it had become KTCL's most played song of the year.

=== Departure from The Fray ===
On March 12, 2022, Slade announced on Instagram that he had parted ways with the Fray, following a series of onstage panic attacks, with his final concert with the band held at Genesee Theatre in Waukegan, Illinois, on May 14, 2022. Since his departure, Slade now runs a record store on Vashon Island, Washington.

On December 9, 2025, Slade announced his first ever solo tour titled the "Songs I Know" tour, in which he performs songs from his back catalogue, some new material, and songs that inspired him as a young artist.

=== Tour with Ed Sheeran ===
On October 3, 2026, Slade performed alongside Ed Sheeran as an opening act on the singer-songwriter's Loop Tour at Mercedes-Benz Stadium in Atlanta, Georgia, after previously performing on the tour during its Toronto stops in August. Slade was added to the Atlanta stop after Sheeran's original openers quit the tour following Macklemore's removal for pro-Palestinian statements made during the tour's New Jersey leg. Slade announced on October 8 that he would be an opening act for the Loop Tour for four additional stops in the United States. He would later announce on November 4 that he would also be an opening act for the six stops on the tour in Latin America.

== Influences ==
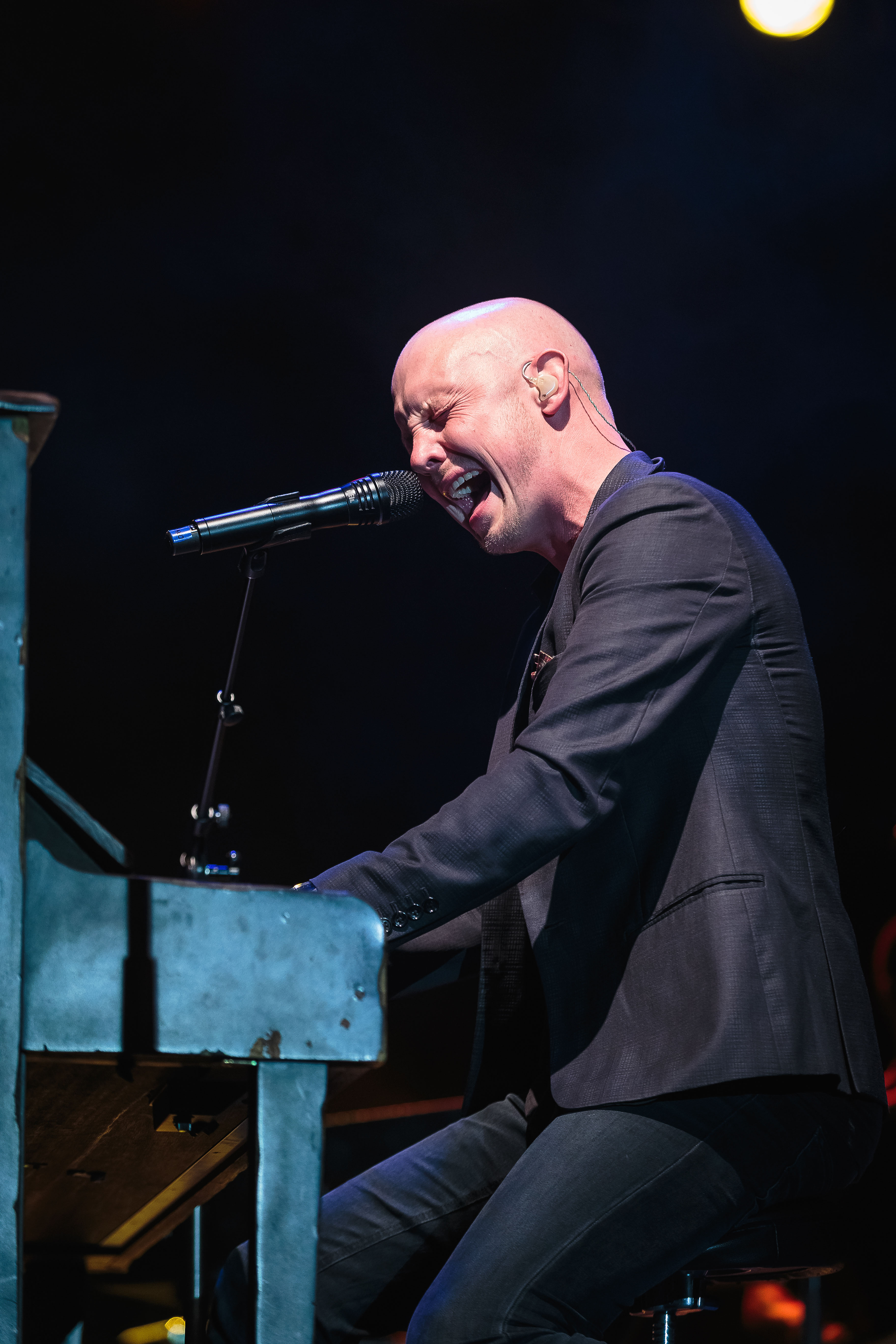
Slade at JazzFest 2016

Slade stated in an interview that one of the first songs that inspired him was "Swallowed" by Bush, and that the lyrics and tune had moved him enough to pursue his career. In a post on AOL Radio Blog, he wrote:

As a boy "Swallowed" was my siren's song. I was a sheltered church child and here's this man talking about living the life his way, doing whatever he felt like doing. Bush wasn't allowed in my house either, which made it that much more mysterious.

His other musical influences include Nine Inch Nails, Queen, Radiohead, R.E.M., Counting Crows, U2, and Led Zeppelin.

== Philanthropy ==
Slade performed on the 2010 remake of the 1985 charity single "We Are the World". He joined 85 other artists on February 1, 2010, to record the track for the victims of the 2010 Haiti earthquake.

On October 27, 2013, Slade and the Fray played at the Colorado Flood Benefit Concert that raised nearly $500,000 for victims of the flood.

== Political views ==
Slade considers himself to be a centrist. He often votes for independent candidates. Slade sponsored Neal Simon, who was running as an independent candidate for senator from Maryland during the 2018 elections. During Slade's performance on October 3, 2026 as part of Ed Sheeran's Loop Tour, he stated that "What’s happening over there [in Gaza] is wrong", but that people needed to find "common ground" regarding it. He also stated that “[Peace] holds enough beauty, enough tragedy, enough sorrow, enough joy and life if we learn how to integrate it and hold each other in balance”.
